= List of minor planets: 530001–531000 =

The following is a partial list of minor planets, running from minor-planet number 530001 through 531000, inclusive. The primary data for this and other partial lists is based on JPL's "Small-Body Orbital Elements" and data available from the Minor Planet Center. Critical list information is also provided by the MPC, unless otherwise specified from Lowell Observatory. A detailed description of the table's columns and additional sources are given on the main page including a complete list of every page in this series, and a statistical break-up on the dynamical classification of minor planets.

Also see the summary list of all named bodies in numerical and alphabetical order, and the corresponding naming citations for the number range of this particular list. New namings may only be added to this list after official publication, as the preannouncement of names is condemned by the Working Group for Small Bodies Nomenclature of the International Astronomical Union.

| Near-Earth obj. | MBA (inner) | MBA (outer) | Centaur |
| Mars-crosser | MBA (middle) | Jupiter trojan | Trans-Neptunian obj. |
| Unclassified |

== 530001–530100 ==
| Designation | | | Discovery | | | Properties | | Ref |
| Permanent | Provisional | Named after | Date | Site | Discoverer(s) | Category | Diam. | Ref |
|---|---|---|---|---|---|---|---|---|
| 530001 | 2010 VM_{76} | — | October 16, 2006 | Kitt Peak | Spacewatch | (5) | 1.0 km | MPC · JPL |
| 530002 | 2010 VX_{77} | — | September 3, 2010 | Mount Lemmon | Mount Lemmon Survey | 3:2 | 4.9 km | MPC · JPL |
| 530003 | 2010 VQ_{78} | — | November 8, 2010 | Mount Lemmon | Mount Lemmon Survey | EOS | 2.1 km | MPC · JPL |
| 530004 | 2010 VZ_{84} | — | November 20, 2006 | Kitt Peak | Spacewatch | · | 820 m | MPC · JPL |
| 530005 | 2010 VR_{86} | — | November 1, 2010 | Mount Lemmon | Mount Lemmon Survey | VER | 2.7 km | MPC · JPL |
| 530006 | 2010 VE_{90} | — | September 25, 2006 | Kitt Peak | Spacewatch | NYS | 860 m | MPC · JPL |
| 530007 | 2010 VK_{90} | — | December 10, 2006 | Kitt Peak | Spacewatch | · | 970 m | MPC · JPL |
| 530008 | 2010 VA_{92} | — | April 18, 2009 | Mount Lemmon | Mount Lemmon Survey | · | 860 m | MPC · JPL |
| 530009 | 2010 VL_{93} | — | November 7, 2010 | Mount Lemmon | Mount Lemmon Survey | · | 660 m | MPC · JPL |
| 530010 | 2010 VR_{97} | — | September 17, 2003 | Kitt Peak | Spacewatch | · | 550 m | MPC · JPL |
| 530011 | 2010 VW_{97} | — | September 30, 2010 | Mount Lemmon | Mount Lemmon Survey | URS | 3.0 km | MPC · JPL |
| 530012 | 2010 VR_{99} | — | October 17, 1995 | Kitt Peak | Spacewatch | NYS | 1.1 km | MPC · JPL |
| 530013 | 2010 VA_{100} | — | November 29, 2003 | Kitt Peak | Spacewatch | V | 780 m | MPC · JPL |
| 530014 | 2010 VN_{104} | — | October 28, 2010 | Kitt Peak | Spacewatch | BAR | 1.1 km | MPC · JPL |
| 530015 | 2010 VG_{105} | — | October 28, 2010 | Mount Lemmon | Mount Lemmon Survey | NYS | 990 m | MPC · JPL |
| 530016 | 2010 VV_{105} | — | April 4, 2008 | Mount Lemmon | Mount Lemmon Survey | · | 970 m | MPC · JPL |
| 530017 | 2010 VM_{106} | — | November 5, 2010 | Mount Lemmon | Mount Lemmon Survey | · | 2.8 km | MPC · JPL |
| 530018 | 2010 VG_{114} | — | January 5, 2003 | Socorro | LINEAR | · | 1.0 km | MPC · JPL |
| 530019 | 2010 VF_{116} | — | October 1, 2010 | Mount Lemmon | Mount Lemmon Survey | H | 470 m | MPC · JPL |
| 530020 | 2010 VU_{116} | — | November 8, 2010 | Kitt Peak | Spacewatch | · | 520 m | MPC · JPL |
| 530021 | 2010 VN_{118} | — | October 30, 2010 | Kitt Peak | Spacewatch | (5) | 1.3 km | MPC · JPL |
| 530022 | 2010 VF_{122} | — | December 14, 1999 | Kitt Peak | Spacewatch | · | 3.2 km | MPC · JPL |
| 530023 | 2010 VQ_{128} | — | November 9, 2010 | Catalina | CSS | · | 1.0 km | MPC · JPL |
| 530024 | 2010 VV_{129} | — | October 12, 2010 | Mount Lemmon | Mount Lemmon Survey | · | 1.0 km | MPC · JPL |
| 530025 | 2010 VL_{133} | — | October 10, 2010 | Mount Lemmon | Mount Lemmon Survey | H | 550 m | MPC · JPL |
| 530026 | 2010 VQ_{133} | — | October 28, 2010 | Mount Lemmon | Mount Lemmon Survey | PHO | 850 m | MPC · JPL |
| 530027 | 2010 VS_{140} | — | October 29, 2010 | Kitt Peak | Spacewatch | HNS | 1.4 km | MPC · JPL |
| 530028 | 2010 VR_{145} | — | September 7, 2010 | La Sagra | OAM | · | 700 m | MPC · JPL |
| 530029 | 2010 VA_{150} | — | October 23, 2006 | Mount Lemmon | Mount Lemmon Survey | · | 640 m | MPC · JPL |
| 530030 | 2010 VF_{158} | — | October 28, 2010 | Mount Lemmon | Mount Lemmon Survey | · | 2.7 km | MPC · JPL |
| 530031 | 2010 VH_{159} | — | December 6, 2002 | Socorro | LINEAR | · | 1.2 km | MPC · JPL |
| 530032 | 2010 VN_{161} | — | September 5, 2010 | Mount Lemmon | Mount Lemmon Survey | · | 1.1 km | MPC · JPL |
| 530033 | 2010 VH_{163} | — | November 10, 2010 | Kitt Peak | Spacewatch | (194) | 1.5 km | MPC · JPL |
| 530034 | 2010 VH_{165} | — | October 29, 2010 | Kitt Peak | Spacewatch | · | 1.1 km | MPC · JPL |
| 530035 | 2010 VC_{167} | — | November 10, 2010 | Mount Lemmon | Mount Lemmon Survey | 3:2 | 4.8 km | MPC · JPL |
| 530036 | 2010 VA_{169} | — | September 19, 2006 | Kitt Peak | Spacewatch | MAS | 500 m | MPC · JPL |
| 530037 | 2010 VN_{171} | — | November 16, 2006 | Kitt Peak | Spacewatch | · | 740 m | MPC · JPL |
| 530038 | 2010 VZ_{171} | — | November 10, 2010 | Mount Lemmon | Mount Lemmon Survey | H | 540 m | MPC · JPL |
| 530039 | 2010 VN_{174} | — | October 30, 2010 | Mount Lemmon | Mount Lemmon Survey | · | 1.3 km | MPC · JPL |
| 530040 | 2010 VS_{179} | — | November 5, 2010 | Mount Lemmon | Mount Lemmon Survey | BAR | 1.5 km | MPC · JPL |
| 530041 | 2010 VA_{180} | — | November 11, 2010 | Mount Lemmon | Mount Lemmon Survey | 3:2 | 4.8 km | MPC · JPL |
| 530042 | 2010 VA_{181} | — | November 16, 2006 | Kitt Peak | Spacewatch | · | 1.0 km | MPC · JPL |
| 530043 | 2010 VG_{186} | — | October 30, 2010 | Mount Lemmon | Mount Lemmon Survey | KON | 2.0 km | MPC · JPL |
| 530044 | 2010 VL_{187} | — | November 13, 2010 | Socorro | LINEAR | · | 2.6 km | MPC · JPL |
| 530045 | 2010 VJ_{192} | — | September 5, 2010 | Mount Lemmon | Mount Lemmon Survey | · | 880 m | MPC · JPL |
| 530046 | 2010 VW_{197} | — | November 15, 2010 | Catalina | CSS | H | 740 m | MPC · JPL |
| 530047 | 2010 VA_{199} | — | September 11, 2010 | Mount Lemmon | Mount Lemmon Survey | BRG | 1.2 km | MPC · JPL |
| 530048 | 2010 VO_{201} | — | November 5, 2010 | Mount Lemmon | Mount Lemmon Survey | H | 560 m | MPC · JPL |
| 530049 | 2010 VY_{202} | — | August 10, 2010 | Kitt Peak | Spacewatch | T_{j} (2.95) | 3.6 km | MPC · JPL |
| 530050 | 2010 VD_{204} | — | October 29, 2010 | Mount Lemmon | Mount Lemmon Survey | · | 930 m | MPC · JPL |
| 530051 | 2010 VN_{208} | — | September 11, 2004 | Kitt Peak | Spacewatch | · | 2.5 km | MPC · JPL |
| 530052 | 2010 VG_{214} | — | August 28, 2006 | Kitt Peak | Spacewatch | · | 1.1 km | MPC · JPL |
| 530053 | 2010 VD_{216} | — | September 11, 2010 | Mount Lemmon | Mount Lemmon Survey | · | 910 m | MPC · JPL |
| 530054 | 2010 VN_{217} | — | November 22, 2006 | Catalina | CSS | · | 830 m | MPC · JPL |
| 530055 | 2010 VW_{224} | — | November 9, 2010 | Haleakala | Pan-STARRS 1 | res · 4:7 | 293 km | MPC · JPL |
| 530056 | 2010 VN_{225} | — | April 29, 2008 | Mount Lemmon | Mount Lemmon Survey | 3:2 | 4.6 km | MPC · JPL |
| 530057 | 2010 VT_{225} | — | December 17, 2006 | Mount Lemmon | Mount Lemmon Survey | V | 700 m | MPC · JPL |
| 530058 | 2010 VV_{225} | — | November 21, 2006 | Mount Lemmon | Mount Lemmon Survey | · | 1.2 km | MPC · JPL |
| 530059 | 2010 VK_{227} | — | November 7, 2010 | Mount Lemmon | Mount Lemmon Survey | · | 1.3 km | MPC · JPL |
| 530060 | 2010 VQ_{227} | — | November 10, 2010 | Mount Lemmon | Mount Lemmon Survey | (5) | 1.1 km | MPC · JPL |
| 530061 | 2010 VG_{228} | — | October 9, 2010 | Mount Lemmon | Mount Lemmon Survey | V | 720 m | MPC · JPL |
| 530062 | 2010 WA_{1} | — | May 2, 2009 | Mount Lemmon | Mount Lemmon Survey | H | 540 m | MPC · JPL |
| 530063 | 2010 WC_{7} | — | April 27, 2009 | Kitt Peak | Spacewatch | H | 350 m | MPC · JPL |
| 530064 | 2010 WH_{17} | — | October 29, 2010 | Kitt Peak | Spacewatch | · | 1.3 km | MPC · JPL |
| 530065 | 2010 WY_{17} | — | November 22, 2006 | Kitt Peak | Spacewatch | · | 1.1 km | MPC · JPL |
| 530066 | 2010 WE_{27} | — | November 6, 2010 | Kitt Peak | Spacewatch | · | 700 m | MPC · JPL |
| 530067 | 2010 WE_{29} | — | October 29, 2010 | Catalina | CSS | · | 1.1 km | MPC · JPL |
| 530068 | 2010 WR_{30} | — | October 29, 2010 | Kitt Peak | Spacewatch | (194) | 1.9 km | MPC · JPL |
| 530069 | 2010 WE_{32} | — | November 10, 2010 | Mount Lemmon | Mount Lemmon Survey | · | 1.2 km | MPC · JPL |
| 530070 | 2010 WU_{43} | — | November 27, 2010 | Mount Lemmon | Mount Lemmon Survey | H | 580 m | MPC · JPL |
| 530071 | 2010 WV_{44} | — | October 29, 2010 | Mount Lemmon | Mount Lemmon Survey | EUN | 1.4 km | MPC · JPL |
| 530072 | 2010 WF_{45} | — | October 30, 2010 | Mount Lemmon | Mount Lemmon Survey | · | 1.3 km | MPC · JPL |
| 530073 | 2010 WW_{47} | — | November 10, 2010 | Mount Lemmon | Mount Lemmon Survey | · | 1.0 km | MPC · JPL |
| 530074 | 2010 WN_{48} | — | November 2, 2010 | Kitt Peak | Spacewatch | · | 1.5 km | MPC · JPL |
| 530075 | 2010 WN_{56} | — | November 25, 2005 | Kitt Peak | Spacewatch | H | 480 m | MPC · JPL |
| 530076 | 2010 WP_{62} | — | November 27, 2010 | Mount Lemmon | Mount Lemmon Survey | · | 1.2 km | MPC · JPL |
| 530077 | 2010 WR_{69} | — | December 24, 2006 | Kitt Peak | Spacewatch | (5) | 990 m | MPC · JPL |
| 530078 | 2010 WA_{70} | — | July 30, 2005 | Palomar | NEAT | · | 1.3 km | MPC · JPL |
| 530079 | 2010 WX_{73} | — | November 28, 2010 | Mount Lemmon | Mount Lemmon Survey | H | 490 m | MPC · JPL |
| 530080 | 2010 WF_{75} | — | January 20, 2008 | Mount Lemmon | Mount Lemmon Survey | · | 1.3 km | MPC · JPL |
| 530081 | 2010 WJ_{75} | — | November 16, 2010 | Mount Lemmon | Mount Lemmon Survey | · | 1.3 km | MPC · JPL |
| 530082 | 2010 WL_{75} | — | August 16, 2006 | Siding Spring | SSS | · | 940 m | MPC · JPL |
| 530083 | 2010 XO_{3} | — | October 13, 2010 | Mount Lemmon | Mount Lemmon Survey | · | 1.0 km | MPC · JPL |
| 530084 | 2010 XZ_{6} | — | November 12, 2010 | Mount Lemmon | Mount Lemmon Survey | · | 1.0 km | MPC · JPL |
| 530085 | 2010 XC_{11} | — | December 3, 2010 | Mount Lemmon | Mount Lemmon Survey | T_{j} (2.79) · APO · PHA | 630 m | MPC · JPL |
| 530086 | 2010 XH_{17} | — | November 6, 2010 | Mount Lemmon | Mount Lemmon Survey | BRG | 1.2 km | MPC · JPL |
| 530087 | 2010 XP_{17} | — | December 2, 2010 | Kitt Peak | Spacewatch | · | 960 m | MPC · JPL |
| 530088 | 2010 XM_{21} | — | October 14, 2010 | Mount Lemmon | Mount Lemmon Survey | · | 1.2 km | MPC · JPL |
| 530089 | 2010 XH_{22} | — | May 27, 2008 | Mount Lemmon | Mount Lemmon Survey | · | 2.2 km | MPC · JPL |
| 530090 | 2010 XL_{22} | — | November 23, 2006 | Kitt Peak | Spacewatch | · | 750 m | MPC · JPL |
| 530091 | 2010 XR_{23} | — | December 6, 2010 | Mount Lemmon | Mount Lemmon Survey | · | 2.1 km | MPC · JPL |
| 530092 | 2010 XH_{33} | — | November 17, 2006 | Mount Lemmon | Mount Lemmon Survey | · | 910 m | MPC · JPL |
| 530093 | 2010 XN_{33} | — | December 2, 2010 | Mount Lemmon | Mount Lemmon Survey | · | 930 m | MPC · JPL |
| 530094 | 2010 XH_{37} | — | January 17, 2007 | Kitt Peak | Spacewatch | · | 850 m | MPC · JPL |
| 530095 | 2010 XB_{40} | — | October 8, 2010 | Kitt Peak | Spacewatch | · | 1.2 km | MPC · JPL |
| 530096 | 2010 XO_{44} | — | December 7, 2010 | Mount Lemmon | Mount Lemmon Survey | H | 520 m | MPC · JPL |
| 530097 | 2010 XR_{47} | — | November 1, 2010 | Mount Lemmon | Mount Lemmon Survey | · | 2.3 km | MPC · JPL |
| 530098 | 2010 XV_{48} | — | December 6, 2010 | Kitt Peak | Spacewatch | EUN | 1.3 km | MPC · JPL |
| 530099 | 2010 XJ_{51} | — | December 10, 2010 | Catalina | CSS | · | 1.0 km | MPC · JPL |
| 530100 | 2010 XR_{51} | — | December 25, 2006 | Kitt Peak | Spacewatch | BRG | 1.5 km | MPC · JPL |

== 530101–530200 ==
back to top

| Designation | | | Discovery | | | Properties | | Ref |
| Permanent | Provisional | Named after | Date | Site | Discoverer(s) | Category | Diam. | Ref |
|---|---|---|---|---|---|---|---|---|
| 530101 | 2010 XD_{52} | — | December 4, 2010 | Mount Lemmon | Mount Lemmon Survey | · | 1.1 km | MPC · JPL |
| 530102 | 2010 XA_{54} | — | October 13, 2010 | Mount Lemmon | Mount Lemmon Survey | · | 2.6 km | MPC · JPL |
| 530103 | 2010 XB_{56} | — | November 17, 2010 | Mount Lemmon | Mount Lemmon Survey | H | 580 m | MPC · JPL |
| 530104 | 2010 XH_{58} | — | November 8, 2010 | Kitt Peak | Spacewatch | · | 1.3 km | MPC · JPL |
| 530105 | 2010 XN_{68} | — | December 8, 2010 | Kitt Peak | Spacewatch | H | 450 m | MPC · JPL |
| 530106 | 2010 XO_{68} | — | January 5, 2003 | Socorro | LINEAR | · | 1.1 km | MPC · JPL |
| 530107 | 2010 XA_{75} | — | November 7, 2010 | Mount Lemmon | Mount Lemmon Survey | · | 1.3 km | MPC · JPL |
| 530108 | 2010 XP_{82} | — | August 26, 2005 | Anderson Mesa | LONEOS | JUN | 1.1 km | MPC · JPL |
| 530109 | 2010 XV_{91} | — | August 28, 2005 | Kitt Peak | Spacewatch | · | 1.1 km | MPC · JPL |
| 530110 | 2010 XW_{91} | — | November 24, 2006 | Mount Lemmon | Mount Lemmon Survey | · | 980 m | MPC · JPL |
| 530111 | 2010 XY_{91} | — | December 14, 2010 | Mount Lemmon | Mount Lemmon Survey | · | 1.7 km | MPC · JPL |
| 530112 | 2010 XK_{92} | — | December 2, 2010 | Kitt Peak | Spacewatch | · | 2.4 km | MPC · JPL |
| 530113 | 2010 XM_{92} | — | December 3, 2010 | Mount Lemmon | Mount Lemmon Survey | NYS | 1 km | MPC · JPL |
| 530114 | 2010 XD_{93} | — | December 13, 2010 | Mount Lemmon | Mount Lemmon Survey | · | 1.2 km | MPC · JPL |
| 530115 | 2010 XC_{94} | — | January 11, 2008 | Kitt Peak | Spacewatch | · | 850 m | MPC · JPL |
| 530116 | 2010 YW_{1} | — | November 8, 2010 | Kitt Peak | Spacewatch | · | 1.1 km | MPC · JPL |
| 530117 | 2010 YG_{3} | — | November 8, 2007 | Mount Lemmon | Mount Lemmon Survey | H | 650 m | MPC · JPL |
| 530118 | 2010 YU_{4} | — | November 5, 2010 | Kitt Peak | Spacewatch | EUN | 1.2 km | MPC · JPL |
| 530119 | 2011 AK_{1} | — | February 22, 1998 | Kitt Peak | Spacewatch | · | 2.3 km | MPC · JPL |
| 530120 | 2011 AP_{1} | — | January 2, 2011 | Mount Lemmon | Mount Lemmon Survey | 3:2 · SHU | 4.4 km | MPC · JPL |
| 530121 | 2011 AV_{2} | — | December 26, 2006 | Kitt Peak | Spacewatch | · | 910 m | MPC · JPL |
| 530122 | 2011 AW_{5} | — | January 3, 2011 | Catalina | CSS | · | 3.3 km | MPC · JPL |
| 530123 | 2011 AL_{8} | — | January 17, 2010 | WISE | WISE | 3:2 | 4.8 km | MPC · JPL |
| 530124 | 2011 AM_{9} | — | November 5, 2010 | Mount Lemmon | Mount Lemmon Survey | · | 1.0 km | MPC · JPL |
| 530125 | 2011 AC_{10} | — | December 27, 2006 | Mount Lemmon | Mount Lemmon Survey | · | 1 km | MPC · JPL |
| 530126 | 2011 AV_{10} | — | December 27, 2006 | Mount Lemmon | Mount Lemmon Survey | · | 780 m | MPC · JPL |
| 530127 | 2011 AA_{14} | — | February 8, 2007 | Mount Lemmon | Mount Lemmon Survey | (5) | 1.0 km | MPC · JPL |
| 530128 | 2011 AN_{14} | — | January 8, 2011 | Mount Lemmon | Mount Lemmon Survey | · | 1.0 km | MPC · JPL |
| 530129 | 2011 AU_{15} | — | December 25, 2010 | Mount Lemmon | Mount Lemmon Survey | · | 1.2 km | MPC · JPL |
| 530130 | 2011 AP_{16} | — | October 14, 2010 | Mount Lemmon | Mount Lemmon Survey | JUN | 1.0 km | MPC · JPL |
| 530131 | 2011 AB_{17} | — | November 8, 2010 | Mount Lemmon | Mount Lemmon Survey | · | 750 m | MPC · JPL |
| 530132 | 2011 AL_{20} | — | November 20, 2001 | Socorro | LINEAR | · | 1.4 km | MPC · JPL |
| 530133 | 2011 AW_{23} | — | November 7, 2010 | Mount Lemmon | Mount Lemmon Survey | · | 860 m | MPC · JPL |
| 530134 | 2011 AP_{26} | — | September 17, 2009 | Kitt Peak | Spacewatch | · | 1.6 km | MPC · JPL |
| 530135 | 2011 AC_{27} | — | January 5, 2011 | Catalina | CSS | · | 1.5 km | MPC · JPL |
| 530136 | 2011 AA_{29} | — | December 29, 2010 | Catalina | CSS | BAR | 1.2 km | MPC · JPL |
| 530137 | 2011 AB_{29} | — | January 11, 2011 | Catalina | CSS | JUN | 870 m | MPC · JPL |
| 530138 | 2011 AE_{36} | — | March 11, 2007 | Kitt Peak | Spacewatch | · | 1.3 km | MPC · JPL |
| 530139 | 2011 AJ_{36} | — | December 5, 2010 | Mount Lemmon | Mount Lemmon Survey | · | 1.4 km | MPC · JPL |
| 530140 | 2011 AW_{36} | — | January 12, 2011 | Kitt Peak | Spacewatch | NYS | 880 m | MPC · JPL |
| 530141 | 2011 AZ_{38} | — | February 23, 2007 | Mount Lemmon | Mount Lemmon Survey | · | 1.0 km | MPC · JPL |
| 530142 | 2011 AZ_{39} | — | February 23, 2007 | Mount Lemmon | Mount Lemmon Survey | (5) | 970 m | MPC · JPL |
| 530143 | 2011 AY_{40} | — | January 10, 2011 | Mount Lemmon | Mount Lemmon Survey | · | 1.0 km | MPC · JPL |
| 530144 | 2011 AK_{45} | — | January 10, 2011 | Kitt Peak | Spacewatch | (5) | 870 m | MPC · JPL |
| 530145 | 2011 AF_{49} | — | September 13, 2005 | Catalina | CSS | · | 2.0 km | MPC · JPL |
| 530146 | 2011 AH_{51} | — | December 5, 2010 | Mount Lemmon | Mount Lemmon Survey | · | 1.1 km | MPC · JPL |
| 530147 | 2011 AQ_{51} | — | December 8, 2010 | Mount Lemmon | Mount Lemmon Survey | · | 1.1 km | MPC · JPL |
| 530148 | 2011 AW_{51} | — | December 9, 2010 | Mount Lemmon | Mount Lemmon Survey | · | 1.3 km | MPC · JPL |
| 530149 | 2011 AG_{55} | — | January 14, 2011 | Mount Lemmon | Mount Lemmon Survey | · | 1.1 km | MPC · JPL |
| 530150 | 2011 AN_{55} | — | January 14, 2011 | Mount Lemmon | Mount Lemmon Survey | · | 780 m | MPC · JPL |
| 530151 | 2011 AW_{55} | — | January 13, 2011 | Mount Lemmon | Mount Lemmon Survey | APO | 260 m | MPC · JPL |
| 530152 | 2011 AQ_{68} | — | January 8, 2010 | WISE | WISE | · | 1.8 km | MPC · JPL |
| 530153 | 2011 AN_{70} | — | January 14, 2011 | Mount Lemmon | Mount Lemmon Survey | · | 1.1 km | MPC · JPL |
| 530154 | 2011 AB_{76} | — | December 6, 2010 | Mount Lemmon | Mount Lemmon Survey | · | 1.1 km | MPC · JPL |
| 530155 | 2011 AG_{76} | — | December 14, 2010 | Mount Lemmon | Mount Lemmon Survey | · | 1 km | MPC · JPL |
| 530156 | 2011 AP_{77} | — | January 11, 2011 | Kitt Peak | Spacewatch | · | 1.4 km | MPC · JPL |
| 530157 | 2011 AR_{77} | — | January 11, 2011 | Catalina | CSS | EUN | 1.1 km | MPC · JPL |
| 530158 | 2011 AF_{78} | — | November 18, 2006 | Kitt Peak | Spacewatch | · | 680 m | MPC · JPL |
| 530159 | 2011 AU_{80} | — | January 3, 2011 | Catalina | CSS | H | 470 m | MPC · JPL |
| 530160 | 2011 AV_{80} | — | January 12, 2011 | Kitt Peak | Spacewatch | H | 470 m | MPC · JPL |
| 530161 | 2011 AW_{80} | — | September 15, 2004 | Socorro | LINEAR | H | 600 m | MPC · JPL |
| 530162 | 2011 AA_{81} | — | January 3, 2011 | Mount Lemmon | Mount Lemmon Survey | · | 950 m | MPC · JPL |
| 530163 | 2011 AB_{81} | — | October 1, 2005 | Mount Lemmon | Mount Lemmon Survey | · | 970 m | MPC · JPL |
| 530164 | 2011 AC_{81} | — | January 11, 2011 | Kitt Peak | Spacewatch | EUN | 1.1 km | MPC · JPL |
| 530165 | 2011 AD_{81} | — | January 14, 2011 | Kitt Peak | Spacewatch | · | 950 m | MPC · JPL |
| 530166 | 2011 AE_{81} | — | January 14, 2011 | Kitt Peak | Spacewatch | · | 1.4 km | MPC · JPL |
| 530167 | 2011 AX_{81} | — | December 5, 2010 | Kitt Peak | Spacewatch | ADE | 1.7 km | MPC · JPL |
| 530168 | 2011 AE_{82} | — | January 4, 2011 | Mount Lemmon | Mount Lemmon Survey | V | 550 m | MPC · JPL |
| 530169 | 2011 AN_{82} | — | December 15, 2006 | Kitt Peak | Spacewatch | NYS | 760 m | MPC · JPL |
| 530170 | 2011 AW_{83} | — | January 14, 2011 | Mount Lemmon | Mount Lemmon Survey | · | 680 m | MPC · JPL |
| 530171 | 2011 BN_{1} | — | January 16, 2011 | Mount Lemmon | Mount Lemmon Survey | EUN | 1.2 km | MPC · JPL |
| 530172 | 2011 BD_{2} | — | December 8, 2010 | Mount Lemmon | Mount Lemmon Survey | H | 430 m | MPC · JPL |
| 530173 | 2011 BF_{2} | — | January 8, 2011 | Mount Lemmon | Mount Lemmon Survey | · | 1.9 km | MPC · JPL |
| 530174 | 2011 BX_{2} | — | January 4, 2011 | Mount Lemmon | Mount Lemmon Survey | · | 2.2 km | MPC · JPL |
| 530175 | 2011 BN_{6} | — | February 17, 2007 | Kitt Peak | Spacewatch | · | 1.3 km | MPC · JPL |
| 530176 | 2011 BC_{8} | — | September 1, 2005 | Kitt Peak | Spacewatch | · | 1.1 km | MPC · JPL |
| 530177 | 2011 BK_{10} | — | January 17, 2011 | Mount Lemmon | Mount Lemmon Survey | H | 490 m | MPC · JPL |
| 530178 | 2011 BN_{10} | — | February 27, 2010 | WISE | WISE | 3:2 | 5.4 km | MPC · JPL |
| 530179 | 2011 BO_{11} | — | July 28, 2009 | Kitt Peak | Spacewatch | · | 1.3 km | MPC · JPL |
| 530180 | 2011 BF_{17} | — | December 9, 2010 | Mount Lemmon | Mount Lemmon Survey | · | 1.8 km | MPC · JPL |
| 530181 | 2011 BC_{19} | — | November 16, 2010 | Mount Lemmon | Mount Lemmon Survey | H | 530 m | MPC · JPL |
| 530182 | 2011 BN_{19} | — | January 27, 2011 | Kitt Peak | Spacewatch | MAR | 1.1 km | MPC · JPL |
| 530183 | 2011 BT_{33} | — | January 31, 1998 | Kitt Peak | Spacewatch | EUN | 1.1 km | MPC · JPL |
| 530184 | 2011 BB_{38} | — | December 5, 2010 | Mount Lemmon | Mount Lemmon Survey | · | 970 m | MPC · JPL |
| 530185 | 2011 BB_{40} | — | January 28, 2011 | Kitt Peak | Spacewatch | · | 2.2 km | MPC · JPL |
| 530186 | 2011 BM_{40} | — | January 8, 2011 | Catalina | CSS | · | 1.2 km | MPC · JPL |
| 530187 | 2011 BP_{43} | — | March 10, 2007 | Mount Lemmon | Mount Lemmon Survey | · | 1.3 km | MPC · JPL |
| 530188 | 2011 BT_{51} | — | January 13, 2011 | Kitt Peak | Spacewatch | H | 480 m | MPC · JPL |
| 530189 | 2011 BE_{53} | — | October 26, 2005 | Kitt Peak | Spacewatch | · | 1.6 km | MPC · JPL |
| 530190 | 2011 BH_{56} | — | November 15, 2010 | Mount Lemmon | Mount Lemmon Survey | · | 1.2 km | MPC · JPL |
| 530191 | 2011 BD_{57} | — | January 25, 2011 | Mount Lemmon | Mount Lemmon Survey | · | 1.3 km | MPC · JPL |
| 530192 | 2011 BY_{58} | — | February 25, 2007 | Mount Lemmon | Mount Lemmon Survey | (5) | 1.2 km | MPC · JPL |
| 530193 | 2011 BV_{62} | — | January 10, 2011 | Kitt Peak | Spacewatch | 3:2 | 4.2 km | MPC · JPL |
| 530194 | 2011 BU_{65} | — | September 15, 2007 | Catalina | CSS | H | 560 m | MPC · JPL |
| 530195 | 2011 BT_{66} | — | January 16, 2011 | Mount Lemmon | Mount Lemmon Survey | H | 470 m | MPC · JPL |
| 530196 | 2011 BV_{71} | — | February 10, 2011 | Mount Lemmon | Mount Lemmon Survey | · | 1.7 km | MPC · JPL |
| 530197 | 2011 BK_{72} | — | February 5, 2011 | Haleakala | Pan-STARRS 1 | · | 820 m | MPC · JPL |
| 530198 | 2011 BR_{75} | — | January 16, 2011 | Mount Lemmon | Mount Lemmon Survey | · | 1.8 km | MPC · JPL |
| 530199 | 2011 BY_{75} | — | February 10, 2011 | Mount Lemmon | Mount Lemmon Survey | · | 1.3 km | MPC · JPL |
| 530200 | 2011 BK_{76} | — | February 25, 2011 | Mount Lemmon | Mount Lemmon Survey | · | 2.1 km | MPC · JPL |

== 530201–530300 ==
back to top

| Designation | | | Discovery | | | Properties | | Ref |
| Permanent | Provisional | Named after | Date | Site | Discoverer(s) | Category | Diam. | Ref |
|---|---|---|---|---|---|---|---|---|
| 530201 | 2011 BP_{76} | — | February 9, 2011 | Mount Lemmon | Mount Lemmon Survey | · | 1.9 km | MPC · JPL |
| 530202 | 2011 BZ_{78} | — | December 9, 2010 | Mount Lemmon | Mount Lemmon Survey | · | 1.9 km | MPC · JPL |
| 530203 | 2011 BF_{80} | — | December 8, 2010 | Mount Lemmon | Mount Lemmon Survey | · | 1.2 km | MPC · JPL |
| 530204 | 2011 BH_{80} | — | December 26, 2005 | Kitt Peak | Spacewatch | · | 2.2 km | MPC · JPL |
| 530205 | 2011 BE_{82} | — | January 3, 2011 | Catalina | CSS | H | 370 m | MPC · JPL |
| 530206 | 2011 BV_{82} | — | January 11, 2011 | Kitt Peak | Spacewatch | · | 1.4 km | MPC · JPL |
| 530207 | 2011 BL_{89} | — | January 8, 2011 | Mount Lemmon | Mount Lemmon Survey | · | 1.6 km | MPC · JPL |
| 530208 | 2011 BH_{90} | — | November 7, 2010 | Mount Lemmon | Mount Lemmon Survey | 3:2 | 3.2 km | MPC · JPL |
| 530209 | 2011 BS_{90} | — | January 28, 2011 | Mount Lemmon | Mount Lemmon Survey | · | 1.1 km | MPC · JPL |
| 530210 | 2011 BX_{90} | — | December 8, 2010 | Mount Lemmon | Mount Lemmon Survey | · | 1.0 km | MPC · JPL |
| 530211 | 2011 BK_{93} | — | December 10, 2010 | Mount Lemmon | Mount Lemmon Survey | · | 1.1 km | MPC · JPL |
| 530212 | 2011 BM_{94} | — | February 21, 2007 | Kitt Peak | Spacewatch | · | 1.6 km | MPC · JPL |
| 530213 | 2011 BA_{98} | — | January 10, 2007 | Kitt Peak | Spacewatch | · | 720 m | MPC · JPL |
| 530214 | 2011 BC_{98} | — | January 17, 2007 | Kitt Peak | Spacewatch | · | 1.1 km | MPC · JPL |
| 530215 | 2011 BT_{99} | — | January 4, 2011 | Mount Lemmon | Mount Lemmon Survey | H | 500 m | MPC · JPL |
| 530216 | 2011 BJ_{104} | — | January 27, 2011 | Mount Lemmon | Mount Lemmon Survey | MAS | 640 m | MPC · JPL |
| 530217 | 2011 BK_{105} | — | January 8, 2010 | WISE | WISE | · | 2.3 km | MPC · JPL |
| 530218 | 2011 BR_{105} | — | October 12, 2009 | Mount Lemmon | Mount Lemmon Survey | 3:2 | 3.3 km | MPC · JPL |
| 530219 | 2011 BU_{112} | — | November 10, 2009 | Mount Lemmon | Mount Lemmon Survey | WIT | 880 m | MPC · JPL |
| 530220 | 2011 BN_{115} | — | January 14, 2011 | Kitt Peak | Spacewatch | H | 420 m | MPC · JPL |
| 530221 | 2011 BW_{126} | — | January 27, 2011 | Mount Lemmon | Mount Lemmon Survey | NYS | 950 m | MPC · JPL |
| 530222 | 2011 BM_{132} | — | January 28, 2011 | Mount Lemmon | Mount Lemmon Survey | · | 1.5 km | MPC · JPL |
| 530223 | 2011 BF_{135} | — | January 29, 2011 | Mount Lemmon | Mount Lemmon Survey | · | 1.1 km | MPC · JPL |
| 530224 | 2011 BL_{144} | — | January 14, 2011 | Kitt Peak | Spacewatch | NYS | 770 m | MPC · JPL |
| 530225 | 2011 BX_{147} | — | January 29, 2011 | Mount Lemmon | Mount Lemmon Survey | · | 1.4 km | MPC · JPL |
| 530226 | 2011 BQ_{152} | — | February 21, 2007 | Mount Lemmon | Mount Lemmon Survey | · | 730 m | MPC · JPL |
| 530227 | 2011 BH_{155} | — | August 15, 2009 | Kitt Peak | Spacewatch | · | 1.2 km | MPC · JPL |
| 530228 | 2011 BR_{155} | — | February 23, 2007 | Mount Lemmon | Mount Lemmon Survey | · | 1.0 km | MPC · JPL |
| 530229 | 2011 BV_{156} | — | January 28, 2011 | Mount Lemmon | Mount Lemmon Survey | · | 780 m | MPC · JPL |
| 530230 | 2011 BW_{156} | — | January 28, 2011 | Mount Lemmon | Mount Lemmon Survey | · | 900 m | MPC · JPL |
| 530231 | 2011 BV_{163} | — | January 30, 2011 | Haleakala | Pan-STARRS 1 | cubewano (cold) | 159 km | MPC · JPL |
| 530232 | 2011 BY_{163} | — | March 5, 2010 | WISE | WISE | 3:2 · SHU | 4.0 km | MPC · JPL |
| 530233 | 2011 BD_{164} | — | January 28, 2011 | Mount Lemmon | Mount Lemmon Survey | · | 1.1 km | MPC · JPL |
| 530234 | 2011 BK_{164} | — | November 6, 2005 | Mount Lemmon | Mount Lemmon Survey | · | 1.2 km | MPC · JPL |
| 530235 | 2011 BM_{164} | — | March 14, 2007 | Mount Lemmon | Mount Lemmon Survey | · | 950 m | MPC · JPL |
| 530236 | 2011 BN_{164} | — | February 21, 2007 | Mount Lemmon | Mount Lemmon Survey | · | 670 m | MPC · JPL |
| 530237 | 2011 BO_{164} | — | January 30, 2011 | Mount Lemmon | Mount Lemmon Survey | · | 2.0 km | MPC · JPL |
| 530238 | 2011 BP_{164} | — | March 20, 2007 | Mount Lemmon | Mount Lemmon Survey | · | 1.5 km | MPC · JPL |
| 530239 | 2011 BQ_{164} | — | September 29, 2009 | Mount Lemmon | Mount Lemmon Survey | · | 1.3 km | MPC · JPL |
| 530240 | 2011 BT_{164} | — | January 27, 2007 | Mount Lemmon | Mount Lemmon Survey | · | 970 m | MPC · JPL |
| 530241 | 2011 BR_{165} | — | October 28, 2005 | Kitt Peak | Spacewatch | · | 1.1 km | MPC · JPL |
| 530242 | 2011 BT_{165} | — | March 9, 2007 | Kitt Peak | Spacewatch | · | 1.1 km | MPC · JPL |
| 530243 | 2011 BW_{165} | — | January 16, 2011 | Mount Lemmon | Mount Lemmon Survey | · | 1.3 km | MPC · JPL |
| 530244 | 2011 BY_{165} | — | January 23, 2011 | Mount Lemmon | Mount Lemmon Survey | · | 980 m | MPC · JPL |
| 530245 | 2011 BG_{166} | — | January 26, 2011 | Mount Lemmon | Mount Lemmon Survey | · | 850 m | MPC · JPL |
| 530246 | 2011 BJ_{166} | — | January 27, 2011 | Mount Lemmon | Mount Lemmon Survey | · | 1.5 km | MPC · JPL |
| 530247 | 2011 BR_{166} | — | January 28, 2011 | Mount Lemmon | Mount Lemmon Survey | · | 2.4 km | MPC · JPL |
| 530248 | 2011 BR_{167} | — | February 5, 2011 | Haleakala | Pan-STARRS 1 | HOF | 1.9 km | MPC · JPL |
| 530249 | 2011 BU_{167} | — | September 22, 2009 | Mount Lemmon | Mount Lemmon Survey | · | 1.4 km | MPC · JPL |
| 530250 | 2011 BE_{169} | — | February 8, 2011 | Mount Lemmon | Mount Lemmon Survey | · | 1.5 km | MPC · JPL |
| 530251 | 2011 BP_{169} | — | January 30, 2011 | Mount Lemmon | Mount Lemmon Survey | · | 1.1 km | MPC · JPL |
| 530252 | 2011 BS_{169} | — | February 13, 2011 | Mount Lemmon | Mount Lemmon Survey | · | 1.4 km | MPC · JPL |
| 530253 | 2011 BW_{169} | — | January 25, 2011 | Mount Lemmon | Mount Lemmon Survey | MAR | 740 m | MPC · JPL |
| 530254 | 2011 BX_{169} | — | November 25, 2006 | Kitt Peak | Spacewatch | · | 960 m | MPC · JPL |
| 530255 | 2011 BY_{169} | — | November 3, 2010 | Mount Lemmon | Mount Lemmon Survey | · | 1.2 km | MPC · JPL |
| 530256 | 2011 BZ_{169} | — | January 28, 2011 | Mount Lemmon | Mount Lemmon Survey | · | 820 m | MPC · JPL |
| 530257 | 2011 BC_{170} | — | January 28, 2007 | Mount Lemmon | Mount Lemmon Survey | · | 860 m | MPC · JPL |
| 530258 | 2011 BJ_{170} | — | February 7, 2011 | Mount Lemmon | Mount Lemmon Survey | V | 500 m | MPC · JPL |
| 530259 | 2011 CN_{3} | — | January 27, 2011 | Mount Lemmon | Mount Lemmon Survey | · | 2.0 km | MPC · JPL |
| 530260 | 2011 CP_{3} | — | January 13, 2011 | Kitt Peak | Spacewatch | · | 890 m | MPC · JPL |
| 530261 | 2011 CV_{6} | — | February 5, 2011 | Kitt Peak | Spacewatch | · | 1.1 km | MPC · JPL |
| 530262 | 2011 CV_{7} | — | January 28, 2011 | Mount Lemmon | Mount Lemmon Survey | · | 1.6 km | MPC · JPL |
| 530263 | 2011 CD_{10} | — | January 12, 2011 | Kitt Peak | Spacewatch | (1547) | 1.4 km | MPC · JPL |
| 530264 | 2011 CJ_{12} | — | January 13, 2011 | Kitt Peak | Spacewatch | MAS | 680 m | MPC · JPL |
| 530265 | 2011 CS_{12} | — | February 5, 2011 | Mount Lemmon | Mount Lemmon Survey | · | 1.8 km | MPC · JPL |
| 530266 | 2011 CA_{15} | — | December 8, 2010 | Mount Lemmon | Mount Lemmon Survey | H | 470 m | MPC · JPL |
| 530267 | 2011 CP_{15} | — | March 20, 2007 | Mount Lemmon | Mount Lemmon Survey | (5) | 780 m | MPC · JPL |
| 530268 | 2011 CH_{16} | — | December 27, 2006 | Mount Lemmon | Mount Lemmon Survey | · | 920 m | MPC · JPL |
| 530269 | 2011 CN_{18} | — | February 4, 2011 | Catalina | CSS | JUN | 860 m | MPC · JPL |
| 530270 | 2011 CH_{19} | — | January 3, 2011 | Mount Lemmon | Mount Lemmon Survey | · | 1.1 km | MPC · JPL |
| 530271 | 2011 CG_{20} | — | October 10, 2005 | Anderson Mesa | LONEOS | · | 1.5 km | MPC · JPL |
| 530272 | 2011 CO_{23} | — | February 5, 2011 | Mount Lemmon | Mount Lemmon Survey | · | 1.2 km | MPC · JPL |
| 530273 | 2011 CC_{24} | — | February 27, 2007 | Kitt Peak | Spacewatch | · | 1.4 km | MPC · JPL |
| 530274 | 2011 CB_{26} | — | January 11, 2011 | Kitt Peak | Spacewatch | H | 530 m | MPC · JPL |
| 530275 | 2011 CX_{26} | — | February 7, 2011 | Mount Lemmon | Mount Lemmon Survey | · | 960 m | MPC · JPL |
| 530276 | 2011 CY_{31} | — | December 10, 2009 | Mount Lemmon | Mount Lemmon Survey | 3:2 | 3.8 km | MPC · JPL |
| 530277 | 2011 CG_{32} | — | January 16, 2011 | Mount Lemmon | Mount Lemmon Survey | · | 1.1 km | MPC · JPL |
| 530278 | 2011 CF_{33} | — | November 12, 2001 | Socorro | LINEAR | (1547) | 1.3 km | MPC · JPL |
| 530279 | 2011 CU_{37} | — | February 5, 2011 | Mount Lemmon | Mount Lemmon Survey | · | 680 m | MPC · JPL |
| 530280 | 2011 CN_{40} | — | February 7, 2011 | Mount Lemmon | Mount Lemmon Survey | · | 1.6 km | MPC · JPL |
| 530281 | 2011 CN_{42} | — | February 7, 2011 | Catalina | CSS | EUN | 1.1 km | MPC · JPL |
| 530282 | 2011 CV_{42} | — | December 29, 2010 | Catalina | CSS | H | 540 m | MPC · JPL |
| 530283 | 2011 CW_{43} | — | February 5, 2011 | Mount Lemmon | Mount Lemmon Survey | · | 990 m | MPC · JPL |
| 530284 | 2011 CT_{46} | — | January 4, 2011 | Mount Lemmon | Mount Lemmon Survey | H | 600 m | MPC · JPL |
| 530285 | 2011 CZ_{47} | — | January 10, 2011 | Mount Lemmon | Mount Lemmon Survey | · | 1.5 km | MPC · JPL |
| 530286 | 2011 CQ_{50} | — | December 29, 2010 | Catalina | CSS | H | 490 m | MPC · JPL |
| 530287 | 2011 CN_{53} | — | January 26, 2011 | Kitt Peak | Spacewatch | · | 1.8 km | MPC · JPL |
| 530288 | 2011 CW_{53} | — | February 6, 2010 | WISE | WISE | 3:2 | 4.1 km | MPC · JPL |
| 530289 | 2011 CC_{57} | — | September 29, 2009 | Mount Lemmon | Mount Lemmon Survey | · | 1.2 km | MPC · JPL |
| 530290 | 2011 CR_{58} | — | February 8, 2011 | Mount Lemmon | Mount Lemmon Survey | · | 940 m | MPC · JPL |
| 530291 | 2011 CQ_{59} | — | January 27, 2011 | Mount Lemmon | Mount Lemmon Survey | · | 1.2 km | MPC · JPL |
| 530292 | 2011 CX_{59} | — | January 7, 2006 | Kitt Peak | Spacewatch | BRA | 1.3 km | MPC · JPL |
| 530293 | 2011 CX_{75} | — | February 10, 2011 | Catalina | CSS | H | 570 m | MPC · JPL |
| 530294 | 2011 CT_{80} | — | February 25, 2011 | Mount Lemmon | Mount Lemmon Survey | · | 660 m | MPC · JPL |
| 530295 | 2011 CF_{82} | — | March 6, 2011 | Mount Lemmon | Mount Lemmon Survey | · | 870 m | MPC · JPL |
| 530296 | 2011 CQ_{85} | — | January 29, 2011 | Kitt Peak | Spacewatch | · | 1.2 km | MPC · JPL |
| 530297 | 2011 CS_{85} | — | April 25, 2003 | Kitt Peak | Spacewatch | · | 1.2 km | MPC · JPL |
| 530298 | 2011 CB_{89} | — | January 4, 2011 | Mount Lemmon | Mount Lemmon Survey | H | 480 m | MPC · JPL |
| 530299 | 2011 CT_{91} | — | January 4, 2011 | Mount Lemmon | Mount Lemmon Survey | · | 1.4 km | MPC · JPL |
| 530300 | 2011 CA_{92} | — | January 29, 2007 | Kitt Peak | Spacewatch | · | 1.1 km | MPC · JPL |

== 530301–530400 ==
back to top

| Designation | | | Discovery | | | Properties | | Ref |
| Permanent | Provisional | Named after | Date | Site | Discoverer(s) | Category | Diam. | Ref |
|---|---|---|---|---|---|---|---|---|
| 530301 | 2011 CL_{105} | — | February 25, 2011 | Mount Lemmon | Mount Lemmon Survey | · | 1.1 km | MPC · JPL |
| 530302 | 2011 CO_{110} | — | February 5, 2011 | Haleakala | Pan-STARRS 1 | MAR | 800 m | MPC · JPL |
| 530303 | 2011 CU_{111} | — | May 11, 2003 | Kitt Peak | Spacewatch | · | 990 m | MPC · JPL |
| 530304 | 2011 CJ_{112} | — | November 25, 2005 | Mount Lemmon | Mount Lemmon Survey | · | 1.1 km | MPC · JPL |
| 530305 | 2011 CY_{116} | — | February 10, 2011 | Mount Lemmon | Mount Lemmon Survey | · | 1.0 km | MPC · JPL |
| 530306 | 2011 CC_{117} | — | February 5, 2011 | Haleakala | Pan-STARRS 1 | · | 1.5 km | MPC · JPL |
| 530307 | 2011 CV_{120} | — | January 4, 2006 | Kitt Peak | Spacewatch | HOF | 1.9 km | MPC · JPL |
| 530308 | 2011 CH_{121} | — | February 10, 2011 | Mount Lemmon | Mount Lemmon Survey | · | 830 m | MPC · JPL |
| 530309 | 2011 CQ_{121} | — | March 12, 2007 | Catalina | CSS | · | 1.8 km | MPC · JPL |
| 530310 | 2011 DK_{1} | — | February 22, 2011 | Kitt Peak | Spacewatch | · | 2.7 km | MPC · JPL |
| 530311 | 2011 DJ_{3} | — | January 26, 2011 | Kitt Peak | Spacewatch | · | 2.0 km | MPC · JPL |
| 530312 | 2011 DV_{3} | — | January 30, 2011 | Kitt Peak | Spacewatch | · | 1.4 km | MPC · JPL |
| 530313 | 2011 DV_{4} | — | September 10, 2004 | Kitt Peak | Spacewatch | H | 430 m | MPC · JPL |
| 530314 | 2011 DA_{9} | — | October 26, 2005 | Anderson Mesa | LONEOS | · | 1.9 km | MPC · JPL |
| 530315 | 2011 DJ_{10} | — | August 23, 2004 | Kitt Peak | Spacewatch | H | 350 m | MPC · JPL |
| 530316 | 2011 DJ_{11} | — | March 16, 2007 | Kitt Peak | Spacewatch | (5) | 1.1 km | MPC · JPL |
| 530317 | 2011 DN_{20} | — | November 16, 2009 | Mount Lemmon | Mount Lemmon Survey | 3:2 | 3.7 km | MPC · JPL |
| 530318 | 2011 DO_{22} | — | September 2, 2008 | La Sagra | OAM | · | 3.9 km | MPC · JPL |
| 530319 | 2011 DA_{24} | — | September 23, 2009 | Kitt Peak | Spacewatch | · | 1.5 km | MPC · JPL |
| 530320 | 2011 DB_{25} | — | January 27, 2007 | Kitt Peak | Spacewatch | · | 1.0 km | MPC · JPL |
| 530321 | 2011 DZ_{29} | — | February 25, 2011 | Mount Lemmon | Mount Lemmon Survey | · | 1.3 km | MPC · JPL |
| 530322 | 2011 DA_{38} | — | March 9, 2007 | Kitt Peak | Spacewatch | · | 730 m | MPC · JPL |
| 530323 | 2011 DJ_{38} | — | February 25, 2011 | Mount Lemmon | Mount Lemmon Survey | · | 1.3 km | MPC · JPL |
| 530324 | 2011 DB_{43} | — | January 26, 2011 | Kitt Peak | Spacewatch | EUN | 1.1 km | MPC · JPL |
| 530325 | 2011 DC_{45} | — | December 30, 2005 | Kitt Peak | Spacewatch | · | 2.0 km | MPC · JPL |
| 530326 | 2011 DX_{46} | — | January 6, 2006 | Mount Lemmon | Mount Lemmon Survey | AGN | 1.0 km | MPC · JPL |
| 530327 | 2011 DS_{47} | — | February 10, 2011 | Catalina | CSS | H | 540 m | MPC · JPL |
| 530328 | 2011 DD_{53} | — | February 25, 2011 | Kitt Peak | Spacewatch | · | 1.9 km | MPC · JPL |
| 530329 | 2011 DF_{53} | — | February 25, 2011 | Kitt Peak | Spacewatch | (5) | 880 m | MPC · JPL |
| 530330 | 2011 DO_{53} | — | June 2, 2008 | Mount Lemmon | Mount Lemmon Survey | · | 1.2 km | MPC · JPL |
| 530331 | 2011 EK_{2} | — | January 28, 2011 | Mount Lemmon | Mount Lemmon Survey | · | 1.5 km | MPC · JPL |
| 530332 | 2011 EL_{3} | — | February 10, 2011 | Mount Lemmon | Mount Lemmon Survey | · | 800 m | MPC · JPL |
| 530333 | 2011 EP_{6} | — | February 10, 2011 | Mount Lemmon | Mount Lemmon Survey | · | 840 m | MPC · JPL |
| 530334 | 2011 EC_{8} | — | March 1, 2011 | Mount Lemmon | Mount Lemmon Survey | H | 510 m | MPC · JPL |
| 530335 | 2011 EL_{9} | — | September 17, 2009 | Mount Lemmon | Mount Lemmon Survey | · | 1.2 km | MPC · JPL |
| 530336 | 2011 EZ_{9} | — | September 14, 2005 | Kitt Peak | Spacewatch | · | 1.5 km | MPC · JPL |
| 530337 | 2011 EB_{16} | — | September 20, 2009 | Mount Lemmon | Mount Lemmon Survey | BAR | 840 m | MPC · JPL |
| 530338 | 2011 EG_{16} | — | January 8, 2011 | Mount Lemmon | Mount Lemmon Survey | · | 1.7 km | MPC · JPL |
| 530339 | 2011 EB_{17} | — | July 30, 2009 | Kitt Peak | Spacewatch | H | 330 m | MPC · JPL |
| 530340 | 2011 ET_{21} | — | January 29, 2011 | Kitt Peak | Spacewatch | · | 770 m | MPC · JPL |
| 530341 | 2011 EL_{22} | — | January 30, 2011 | Kitt Peak | Spacewatch | · | 1.1 km | MPC · JPL |
| 530342 | 2011 EJ_{23} | — | March 15, 2007 | Mount Lemmon | Mount Lemmon Survey | · | 900 m | MPC · JPL |
| 530343 | 2011 EC_{26} | — | March 6, 2011 | Mount Lemmon | Mount Lemmon Survey | · | 1.2 km | MPC · JPL |
| 530344 | 2011 EA_{29} | — | March 10, 2007 | Mount Lemmon | Mount Lemmon Survey | · | 1.5 km | MPC · JPL |
| 530345 | 2011 EF_{30} | — | January 29, 2011 | Kitt Peak | Spacewatch | DOR | 2.0 km | MPC · JPL |
| 530346 | 2011 EX_{31} | — | March 8, 2011 | Catalina | CSS | H | 610 m | MPC · JPL |
| 530347 | 2011 EM_{36} | — | February 4, 2010 | WISE | WISE | · | 1.8 km | MPC · JPL |
| 530348 | 2011 EC_{38} | — | March 6, 2011 | Kitt Peak | Spacewatch | · | 1.2 km | MPC · JPL |
| 530349 | 2011 EC_{40} | — | January 28, 2011 | Kitt Peak | Spacewatch | · | 1.2 km | MPC · JPL |
| 530350 | 2011 EQ_{43} | — | January 20, 2010 | WISE | WISE | · | 1.7 km | MPC · JPL |
| 530351 | 2011 EE_{45} | — | March 25, 2007 | Mount Lemmon | Mount Lemmon Survey | · | 1.3 km | MPC · JPL |
| 530352 | 2011 EJ_{52} | — | February 25, 2011 | Kitt Peak | Spacewatch | · | 1.0 km | MPC · JPL |
| 530353 | 2011 ET_{53} | — | November 27, 2009 | Mount Lemmon | Mount Lemmon Survey | · | 1.8 km | MPC · JPL |
| 530354 | 2011 EV_{53} | — | April 20, 2007 | Kitt Peak | Spacewatch | · | 880 m | MPC · JPL |
| 530355 | 2011 EX_{54} | — | February 25, 2011 | Kitt Peak | Spacewatch | · | 1.3 km | MPC · JPL |
| 530356 | 2011 EF_{55} | — | March 11, 2011 | Kitt Peak | Spacewatch | · | 770 m | MPC · JPL |
| 530357 | 2011 EX_{59} | — | December 27, 2005 | Mount Lemmon | Mount Lemmon Survey | DOR | 2.4 km | MPC · JPL |
| 530358 | 2011 EE_{62} | — | December 12, 2010 | Kitt Peak | Spacewatch | · | 1.5 km | MPC · JPL |
| 530359 | 2011 EF_{62} | — | October 27, 2005 | Kitt Peak | Spacewatch | · | 1.1 km | MPC · JPL |
| 530360 | 2011 EH_{66} | — | March 10, 2011 | Kitt Peak | Spacewatch | · | 1.7 km | MPC · JPL |
| 530361 | 2011 EB_{67} | — | February 8, 2011 | Mount Lemmon | Mount Lemmon Survey | · | 1.7 km | MPC · JPL |
| 530362 | 2011 ES_{68} | — | April 18, 2007 | Mount Lemmon | Mount Lemmon Survey | · | 1.1 km | MPC · JPL |
| 530363 | 2011 EY_{74} | — | February 26, 2011 | Catalina | CSS | H | 460 m | MPC · JPL |
| 530364 | 2011 EN_{76} | — | January 9, 2011 | Mount Lemmon | Mount Lemmon Survey | · | 1.5 km | MPC · JPL |
| 530365 | 2011 EX_{76} | — | February 5, 2011 | Mount Lemmon | Mount Lemmon Survey | · | 1.7 km | MPC · JPL |
| 530366 | 2011 EU_{84} | — | March 6, 2011 | Mount Lemmon | Mount Lemmon Survey | · | 1.3 km | MPC · JPL |
| 530367 | 2011 ER_{88} | — | September 5, 2007 | Catalina | CSS | · | 3.3 km | MPC · JPL |
| 530368 | 2011 EZ_{88} | — | March 14, 2011 | Mount Lemmon | Mount Lemmon Survey | · | 1.0 km | MPC · JPL |
| 530369 | 2011 EN_{90} | — | March 13, 2011 | Kitt Peak | Spacewatch | · | 880 m | MPC · JPL |
| 530370 | 2011 ES_{90} | — | March 1, 2011 | Mount Lemmon | Mount Lemmon Survey | · | 640 m | MPC · JPL |
| 530371 | 2011 FE_{1} | — | September 19, 2009 | Kitt Peak | Spacewatch | · | 2.0 km | MPC · JPL |
| 530372 | 2011 FW_{2} | — | November 9, 1999 | Socorro | LINEAR | H | 460 m | MPC · JPL |
| 530373 | 2011 FT_{3} | — | September 10, 2004 | Kitt Peak | Spacewatch | H | 430 m | MPC · JPL |
| 530374 | 2011 FE_{6} | — | March 5, 2011 | Kitt Peak | Spacewatch | · | 860 m | MPC · JPL |
| 530375 | 2011 FZ_{7} | — | March 26, 2011 | Kitt Peak | Spacewatch | EUN | 1.0 km | MPC · JPL |
| 530376 | 2011 FZ_{11} | — | March 1, 2011 | Mount Lemmon | Mount Lemmon Survey | · | 1.0 km | MPC · JPL |
| 530377 | 2011 FB_{14} | — | November 25, 2009 | Kitt Peak | Spacewatch | KOR | 1.4 km | MPC · JPL |
| 530378 | 2011 FU_{24} | — | September 23, 2008 | Mount Lemmon | Mount Lemmon Survey | · | 1.8 km | MPC · JPL |
| 530379 | 2011 FE_{27} | — | November 21, 2009 | Kitt Peak | Spacewatch | · | 1.7 km | MPC · JPL |
| 530380 | 2011 FJ_{27} | — | October 22, 2009 | Mount Lemmon | Mount Lemmon Survey | · | 1.4 km | MPC · JPL |
| 530381 | 2011 FY_{27} | — | January 16, 2011 | Mount Lemmon | Mount Lemmon Survey | BAR | 1.1 km | MPC · JPL |
| 530382 | 2011 FU_{31} | — | March 28, 2011 | Kitt Peak | Spacewatch | · | 1.4 km | MPC · JPL |
| 530383 | 2011 FJ_{42} | — | January 26, 2011 | Mount Lemmon | Mount Lemmon Survey | · | 2.1 km | MPC · JPL |
| 530384 | 2011 FG_{43} | — | March 27, 2011 | Kitt Peak | Spacewatch | · | 1.6 km | MPC · JPL |
| 530385 | 2011 FF_{44} | — | April 15, 2007 | Catalina | CSS | · | 1.2 km | MPC · JPL |
| 530386 | 2011 FP_{46} | — | May 1, 2003 | Kitt Peak | Spacewatch | · | 870 m | MPC · JPL |
| 530387 | 2011 FM_{48} | — | March 29, 2011 | Kitt Peak | Spacewatch | EUN | 880 m | MPC · JPL |
| 530388 | 2011 FZ_{48} | — | February 11, 2011 | Kitt Peak | Spacewatch | H | 580 m | MPC · JPL |
| 530389 | 2011 FO_{50} | — | March 30, 2011 | Mount Lemmon | Mount Lemmon Survey | · | 1.5 km | MPC · JPL |
| 530390 | 2011 FE_{51} | — | March 30, 2011 | XuYi | PMO NEO Survey Program | · | 1.8 km | MPC · JPL |
| 530391 | 2011 FH_{56} | — | March 10, 2011 | Kitt Peak | Spacewatch | · | 1.0 km | MPC · JPL |
| 530392 | 2011 FQ_{56} | — | March 31, 2011 | Kitt Peak | Spacewatch | T_{j} (2.92) | 4.3 km | MPC · JPL |
| 530393 | 2011 FR_{60} | — | March 2, 2011 | Kitt Peak | Spacewatch | EUN | 900 m | MPC · JPL |
| 530394 | 2011 FT_{62} | — | March 2, 2011 | Kitt Peak | Spacewatch | · | 1.7 km | MPC · JPL |
| 530395 | 2011 FE_{69} | — | March 6, 2011 | Kitt Peak | Spacewatch | HNS | 1.0 km | MPC · JPL |
| 530396 | 2011 FN_{69} | — | March 28, 2011 | Catalina | CSS | · | 3.6 km | MPC · JPL |
| 530397 | 2011 FV_{69} | — | September 26, 2009 | Mount Lemmon | Mount Lemmon Survey | H | 600 m | MPC · JPL |
| 530398 | 2011 FN_{71} | — | November 10, 2009 | Kitt Peak | Spacewatch | · | 1.5 km | MPC · JPL |
| 530399 | 2011 FT_{73} | — | September 18, 2009 | Mount Lemmon | Mount Lemmon Survey | · | 1.3 km | MPC · JPL |
| 530400 | 2011 FJ_{80} | — | October 30, 2005 | Kitt Peak | Spacewatch | · | 690 m | MPC · JPL |

== 530401–530500 ==
back to top

| Designation | | | Discovery | | | Properties | | Ref |
| Permanent | Provisional | Named after | Date | Site | Discoverer(s) | Category | Diam. | Ref |
|---|---|---|---|---|---|---|---|---|
| 530401 | 2011 FA_{83} | — | March 29, 2011 | Siding Spring | SSS | · | 1.8 km | MPC · JPL |
| 530402 | 2011 FV_{85} | — | March 29, 2011 | Mount Lemmon | Mount Lemmon Survey | H | 410 m | MPC · JPL |
| 530403 | 2011 FW_{88} | — | March 25, 2011 | Haleakala | Pan-STARRS 1 | · | 1.7 km | MPC · JPL |
| 530404 | 2011 FN_{90} | — | February 25, 2011 | Kitt Peak | Spacewatch | · | 1.4 km | MPC · JPL |
| 530405 | 2011 FF_{106} | — | September 5, 2008 | Kitt Peak | Spacewatch | · | 2.3 km | MPC · JPL |
| 530406 | 2011 FO_{133} | — | September 16, 2004 | Kitt Peak | Spacewatch | · | 1.4 km | MPC · JPL |
| 530407 | 2011 FH_{141} | — | March 25, 2011 | Kitt Peak | Spacewatch | · | 930 m | MPC · JPL |
| 530408 | 2011 FV_{145} | — | April 25, 2007 | Mount Lemmon | Mount Lemmon Survey | · | 1.5 km | MPC · JPL |
| 530409 | 2011 FM_{146} | — | March 9, 2011 | Mount Lemmon | Mount Lemmon Survey | · | 1.2 km | MPC · JPL |
| 530410 | 2011 FP_{148} | — | March 29, 2011 | Siding Spring | SSS | · | 1.7 km | MPC · JPL |
| 530411 | 2011 FE_{151} | — | March 27, 2011 | Catalina | CSS | · | 2.1 km | MPC · JPL |
| 530412 | 2011 FZ_{154} | — | March 31, 2011 | Haleakala | Pan-STARRS 1 | H | 390 m | MPC · JPL |
| 530413 | 2011 FR_{157} | — | February 25, 2011 | Mount Lemmon | Mount Lemmon Survey | · | 1.1 km | MPC · JPL |
| 530414 | 2011 FZ_{158} | — | October 18, 2009 | Mount Lemmon | Mount Lemmon Survey | · | 1.3 km | MPC · JPL |
| 530415 | 2011 FP_{159} | — | April 10, 2010 | WISE | WISE | · | 3.9 km | MPC · JPL |
| 530416 | 2011 GV_{14} | — | March 11, 2011 | Kitt Peak | Spacewatch | · | 1.1 km | MPC · JPL |
| 530417 | 2011 GX_{26} | — | March 11, 2011 | Mount Lemmon | Mount Lemmon Survey | · | 820 m | MPC · JPL |
| 530418 | 2011 GX_{27} | — | April 2, 2011 | Mount Lemmon | Mount Lemmon Survey | · | 2.0 km | MPC · JPL |
| 530419 | 2011 GM_{31} | — | October 24, 2005 | Kitt Peak | Spacewatch | · | 890 m | MPC · JPL |
| 530420 | 2011 GN_{32} | — | April 1, 2011 | Kitt Peak | Spacewatch | HNS | 1.0 km | MPC · JPL |
| 530421 | 2011 GV_{41} | — | November 17, 2009 | Mount Lemmon | Mount Lemmon Survey | · | 1.7 km | MPC · JPL |
| 530422 | 2011 GO_{49} | — | March 13, 2011 | Mount Lemmon | Mount Lemmon Survey | · | 1.4 km | MPC · JPL |
| 530423 | 2011 GU_{53} | — | September 7, 2008 | Mount Lemmon | Mount Lemmon Survey | (5) | 1.1 km | MPC · JPL |
| 530424 | 2011 GV_{56} | — | April 25, 2007 | Mount Lemmon | Mount Lemmon Survey | · | 1.0 km | MPC · JPL |
| 530425 | 2011 GZ_{56} | — | November 20, 2001 | Socorro | LINEAR | (5) | 1.1 km | MPC · JPL |
| 530426 | 2011 GG_{57} | — | January 14, 2011 | Mount Lemmon | Mount Lemmon Survey | EUN | 1.1 km | MPC · JPL |
| 530427 | 2011 GK_{61} | — | May 27, 2003 | Kitt Peak | Spacewatch | · | 720 m | MPC · JPL |
| 530428 | 2011 GU_{61} | — | January 17, 2011 | Mount Lemmon | Mount Lemmon Survey | JUN | 1.2 km | MPC · JPL |
| 530429 | 2011 GD_{63} | — | March 14, 2011 | Kitt Peak | Spacewatch | H | 480 m | MPC · JPL |
| 530430 | 2011 GL_{73} | — | April 13, 2011 | Mount Lemmon | Mount Lemmon Survey | · | 1.1 km | MPC · JPL |
| 530431 | 2011 GR_{78} | — | March 16, 2011 | Haleakala | Pan-STARRS 1 | H | 390 m | MPC · JPL |
| 530432 | 2011 GK_{90} | — | April 12, 2011 | Mount Lemmon | Mount Lemmon Survey | · | 940 m | MPC · JPL |
| 530433 | 2011 GM_{90} | — | April 13, 2011 | Haleakala | Pan-STARRS 1 | · | 1.8 km | MPC · JPL |
| 530434 | 2011 GP_{90} | — | January 8, 2006 | Mount Lemmon | Mount Lemmon Survey | · | 1.0 km | MPC · JPL |
| 530435 | 2011 GT_{90} | — | November 10, 1996 | Kitt Peak | Spacewatch | · | 1.5 km | MPC · JPL |
| 530436 | 2011 GW_{90} | — | April 3, 2011 | Haleakala | Pan-STARRS 1 | · | 1.1 km | MPC · JPL |
| 530437 | 2011 GA_{91} | — | April 2, 2011 | Mount Lemmon | Mount Lemmon Survey | EUP | 3.3 km | MPC · JPL |
| 530438 | 2011 GB_{91} | — | April 5, 2011 | Kitt Peak | Spacewatch | · | 2.3 km | MPC · JPL |
| 530439 | 2011 HW_{3} | — | March 25, 2010 | WISE | WISE | · | 5.3 km | MPC · JPL |
| 530440 | 2011 HL_{5} | — | April 27, 2011 | La Sagra | OAM | · | 1.7 km | MPC · JPL |
| 530441 | 2011 HV_{6} | — | April 24, 2011 | Kitt Peak | Spacewatch | H | 530 m | MPC · JPL |
| 530442 | 2011 HA_{12} | — | April 22, 2011 | Kitt Peak | Spacewatch | · | 1.6 km | MPC · JPL |
| 530443 | 2011 HV_{12} | — | April 23, 2011 | Kitt Peak | Spacewatch | · | 2.1 km | MPC · JPL |
| 530444 | 2011 HV_{13} | — | May 15, 2007 | Mount Lemmon | Mount Lemmon Survey | · | 890 m | MPC · JPL |
| 530445 | 2011 HP_{17} | — | April 15, 2007 | Kitt Peak | Spacewatch | · | 1.0 km | MPC · JPL |
| 530446 | 2011 HM_{19} | — | April 26, 2011 | Kitt Peak | Spacewatch | · | 730 m | MPC · JPL |
| 530447 | 2011 HH_{25} | — | April 11, 2007 | Mount Lemmon | Mount Lemmon Survey | · | 970 m | MPC · JPL |
| 530448 | 2011 HU_{30} | — | April 29, 2011 | Mount Lemmon | Mount Lemmon Survey | EUN | 1.4 km | MPC · JPL |
| 530449 | 2011 HB_{32} | — | February 12, 2011 | Mount Lemmon | Mount Lemmon Survey | · | 2.6 km | MPC · JPL |
| 530450 | 2011 HU_{34} | — | April 29, 2011 | Kitt Peak | Spacewatch | · | 2.8 km | MPC · JPL |
| 530451 | 2011 HA_{35} | — | April 26, 2011 | Kitt Peak | Spacewatch | · | 3.0 km | MPC · JPL |
| 530452 | 2011 HJ_{36} | — | April 26, 2011 | Kitt Peak | Spacewatch | · | 2.8 km | MPC · JPL |
| 530453 | 2011 HN_{36} | — | April 6, 2011 | Mount Lemmon | Mount Lemmon Survey | · | 2.2 km | MPC · JPL |
| 530454 | 2011 HT_{44} | — | April 27, 2011 | Haleakala | Pan-STARRS 1 | EOS | 1.9 km | MPC · JPL |
| 530455 | 2011 HF_{49} | — | October 29, 2002 | Apache Point | SDSS | · | 2.5 km | MPC · JPL |
| 530456 | 2011 HP_{50} | — | December 25, 2005 | Kitt Peak | Spacewatch | JUN | 810 m | MPC · JPL |
| 530457 | 2011 HL_{51} | — | April 30, 2011 | Kitt Peak | Spacewatch | ADE | 1.4 km | MPC · JPL |
| 530458 | 2011 HV_{52} | — | September 27, 2009 | Kitt Peak | Spacewatch | H | 370 m | MPC · JPL |
| 530459 | 2011 HM_{54} | — | April 22, 2011 | Kitt Peak | Spacewatch | EOS | 2.0 km | MPC · JPL |
| 530460 | 2011 HL_{58} | — | April 30, 2011 | Haleakala | Pan-STARRS 1 | · | 2.8 km | MPC · JPL |
| 530461 | 2011 HA_{59} | — | March 29, 2011 | Kitt Peak | Spacewatch | LIX | 3.2 km | MPC · JPL |
| 530462 | 2011 HL_{59} | — | April 30, 2011 | Kitt Peak | Spacewatch | · | 1.8 km | MPC · JPL |
| 530463 | 2011 HS_{64} | — | April 21, 2011 | Haleakala | Pan-STARRS 1 | EUN | 790 m | MPC · JPL |
| 530464 | 2011 HM_{65} | — | March 31, 2011 | Mount Lemmon | Mount Lemmon Survey | H | 570 m | MPC · JPL |
| 530465 | 2011 HW_{66} | — | April 22, 2011 | Kitt Peak | Spacewatch | · | 2.6 km | MPC · JPL |
| 530466 | 2011 HC_{74} | — | April 27, 2011 | Kitt Peak | Spacewatch | EUN | 910 m | MPC · JPL |
| 530467 | 2011 HK_{74} | — | April 5, 2011 | Kitt Peak | Spacewatch | H | 440 m | MPC · JPL |
| 530468 | 2011 HH_{78} | — | January 30, 2011 | Haleakala | Pan-STARRS 1 | · | 4.6 km | MPC · JPL |
| 530469 | 2011 HX_{79} | — | April 28, 2011 | Haleakala | Pan-STARRS 1 | · | 920 m | MPC · JPL |
| 530470 | 2011 HV_{80} | — | May 10, 2008 | Mount Lemmon | Mount Lemmon Survey | H | 590 m | MPC · JPL |
| 530471 | 2011 HX_{89} | — | March 26, 2011 | Mount Lemmon | Mount Lemmon Survey | · | 1.5 km | MPC · JPL |
| 530472 | 2011 HG_{96} | — | April 1, 2011 | Mount Lemmon | Mount Lemmon Survey | EUN | 770 m | MPC · JPL |
| 530473 | 2011 HR_{96} | — | April 5, 2011 | Kitt Peak | Spacewatch | · | 1.8 km | MPC · JPL |
| 530474 | 2011 HM_{100} | — | April 26, 2011 | Kitt Peak | Spacewatch | · | 2.4 km | MPC · JPL |
| 530475 | 2011 HW_{103} | — | May 11, 2007 | Mount Lemmon | Mount Lemmon Survey | · | 1.2 km | MPC · JPL |
| 530476 | 2011 HA_{104} | — | October 20, 2008 | Kitt Peak | Spacewatch | · | 1.0 km | MPC · JPL |
| 530477 | 2011 HB_{104} | — | April 26, 2011 | Mount Lemmon | Mount Lemmon Survey | THB | 2.7 km | MPC · JPL |
| 530478 | 2011 HC_{104} | — | April 11, 2011 | Mount Lemmon | Mount Lemmon Survey | BRA | 1.5 km | MPC · JPL |
| 530479 | 2011 HK_{104} | — | April 23, 2011 | Kitt Peak | Spacewatch | TEL | 1.2 km | MPC · JPL |
| 530480 | 2011 HM_{104} | — | May 2, 2010 | WISE | WISE | · | 1.9 km | MPC · JPL |
| 530481 | 2011 JX_{2} | — | January 28, 2010 | WISE | WISE | · | 2.2 km | MPC · JPL |
| 530482 | 2011 JB_{5} | — | March 15, 2007 | Mount Lemmon | Mount Lemmon Survey | · | 970 m | MPC · JPL |
| 530483 | 2011 JW_{6} | — | May 3, 2011 | Kitt Peak | Spacewatch | · | 1.0 km | MPC · JPL |
| 530484 | 2011 JG_{8} | — | November 20, 2003 | Kitt Peak | Spacewatch | · | 510 m | MPC · JPL |
| 530485 | 2011 JL_{8} | — | October 2, 2009 | Mount Lemmon | Mount Lemmon Survey | H | 410 m | MPC · JPL |
| 530486 | 2011 JR_{8} | — | May 1, 2011 | Haleakala | Pan-STARRS 1 | EOS | 2.2 km | MPC · JPL |
| 530487 | 2011 JY_{12} | — | April 5, 2011 | Catalina | CSS | · | 1.3 km | MPC · JPL |
| 530488 | 2011 JA_{14} | — | April 24, 2011 | Kitt Peak | Spacewatch | · | 1.3 km | MPC · JPL |
| 530489 | 2011 JK_{15} | — | April 13, 2011 | Haleakala | Pan-STARRS 1 | · | 1.5 km | MPC · JPL |
| 530490 | 2011 JD_{17} | — | October 28, 2008 | Mount Lemmon | Mount Lemmon Survey | · | 1.1 km | MPC · JPL |
| 530491 | 2011 JO_{20} | — | April 26, 2011 | Kitt Peak | Spacewatch | · | 1.1 km | MPC · JPL |
| 530492 | 2011 JQ_{21} | — | April 13, 2011 | Kitt Peak | Spacewatch | · | 900 m | MPC · JPL |
| 530493 | 2011 JY_{25} | — | April 23, 2011 | Kitt Peak | Spacewatch | EOS | 1.8 km | MPC · JPL |
| 530494 | 2011 JE_{26} | — | May 6, 2011 | Kitt Peak | Spacewatch | (5) | 1.4 km | MPC · JPL |
| 530495 | 2011 JH_{26} | — | May 7, 2011 | Kitt Peak | Spacewatch | · | 1.4 km | MPC · JPL |
| 530496 | 2011 JN_{28} | — | May 13, 2011 | Mount Lemmon | Mount Lemmon Survey | · | 1.5 km | MPC · JPL |
| 530497 | 2011 JA_{30} | — | March 27, 2011 | Kitt Peak | Spacewatch | · | 1.3 km | MPC · JPL |
| 530498 | 2011 JS_{31} | — | April 4, 2011 | Catalina | CSS | RAF | 1.0 km | MPC · JPL |
| 530499 | 2011 JH_{32} | — | May 10, 2007 | Mount Lemmon | Mount Lemmon Survey | EUN | 860 m | MPC · JPL |
| 530500 | 2011 JL_{32} | — | May 13, 2011 | Mount Lemmon | Mount Lemmon Survey | ADE | 1.6 km | MPC · JPL |

== 530501–530600 ==
back to top

| Designation | | | Discovery | | | Properties | | Ref |
| Permanent | Provisional | Named after | Date | Site | Discoverer(s) | Category | Diam. | Ref |
|---|---|---|---|---|---|---|---|---|
| 530501 | 2011 JP_{32} | — | May 1, 2011 | Haleakala | Pan-STARRS 1 | · | 2.7 km | MPC · JPL |
| 530502 | 2011 JR_{32} | — | May 6, 2011 | Kitt Peak | Spacewatch | · | 1 km | MPC · JPL |
| 530503 | 2011 JU_{32} | — | May 12, 2011 | Mount Lemmon | Mount Lemmon Survey | · | 1.9 km | MPC · JPL |
| 530504 | 2011 JY_{32} | — | May 1, 2011 | Haleakala | Pan-STARRS 1 | · | 1.6 km | MPC · JPL |
| 530505 | 2011 JA_{33} | — | May 3, 2011 | Mount Lemmon | Mount Lemmon Survey | · | 1.3 km | MPC · JPL |
| 530506 | 2011 JD_{33} | — | October 14, 2007 | Mount Lemmon | Mount Lemmon Survey | T_{j} (2.96) | 3.1 km | MPC · JPL |
| 530507 | 2011 KW_{1} | — | April 30, 2011 | Haleakala | Pan-STARRS 1 | EUN | 980 m | MPC · JPL |
| 530508 | 2011 KP_{2} | — | November 18, 2003 | Kitt Peak | Spacewatch | KOR | 1.7 km | MPC · JPL |
| 530509 | 2011 KO_{4} | — | May 22, 2011 | Mount Lemmon | Mount Lemmon Survey | · | 1.4 km | MPC · JPL |
| 530510 | 2011 KP_{9} | — | May 7, 2011 | Kitt Peak | Spacewatch | · | 960 m | MPC · JPL |
| 530511 | 2011 KU_{12} | — | April 29, 2011 | Mount Lemmon | Mount Lemmon Survey | · | 1.5 km | MPC · JPL |
| 530512 | 2011 KO_{16} | — | May 25, 2011 | Kitt Peak | Spacewatch | BAR | 1.0 km | MPC · JPL |
| 530513 | 2011 KT_{18} | — | May 21, 2011 | Haleakala | Pan-STARRS 1 | KON | 2.0 km | MPC · JPL |
| 530514 | 2011 KO_{22} | — | April 30, 2011 | Haleakala | Pan-STARRS 1 | · | 1.3 km | MPC · JPL |
| 530515 | 2011 KT_{29} | — | May 21, 2011 | Haleakala | Pan-STARRS 1 | · | 1.1 km | MPC · JPL |
| 530516 | 2011 KL_{49} | — | May 23, 2011 | Mount Lemmon | Mount Lemmon Survey | · | 2.2 km | MPC · JPL |
| 530517 | 2011 KS_{49} | — | May 22, 2011 | Mount Lemmon | Mount Lemmon Survey | · | 1.1 km | MPC · JPL |
| 530518 | 2011 KU_{49} | — | May 21, 2011 | Mount Lemmon | Mount Lemmon Survey | · | 1.8 km | MPC · JPL |
| 530519 | 2011 LM_{5} | — | May 22, 2011 | Mount Lemmon | Mount Lemmon Survey | · | 1.4 km | MPC · JPL |
| 530520 | 2011 LT_{17} | — | June 9, 2011 | Catalina | CSS | APO · PHA · fast | 150 m | MPC · JPL |
| 530521 | 2011 LQ_{19} | — | December 31, 2005 | Kitt Peak | Spacewatch | · | 1.5 km | MPC · JPL |
| 530522 | 2011 LQ_{23} | — | September 27, 2005 | Kitt Peak | Spacewatch | · | 500 m | MPC · JPL |
| 530523 | 2011 LH_{29} | — | June 9, 2011 | Mount Lemmon | Mount Lemmon Survey | · | 570 m | MPC · JPL |
| 530524 | 2011 MH_{11} | — | June 3, 2011 | Mount Lemmon | Mount Lemmon Survey | · | 1.1 km | MPC · JPL |
| 530525 | 2011 MQ_{11} | — | June 27, 2011 | Kitt Peak | Spacewatch | TIR | 2.2 km | MPC · JPL |
| 530526 | 2011 MS_{11} | — | June 27, 2011 | Mount Lemmon | Mount Lemmon Survey | HOF | 2.3 km | MPC · JPL |
| 530527 | 2011 ND_{1} | — | February 16, 2010 | Mount Lemmon | Mount Lemmon Survey | BAR | 1.2 km | MPC · JPL |
| 530528 | 2011 NJ_{4} | — | December 28, 2007 | Kitt Peak | Spacewatch | · | 3.8 km | MPC · JPL |
| 530529 | 2011 NO_{4} | — | July 1, 2011 | Kitt Peak | Spacewatch | · | 1.8 km | MPC · JPL |
| 530530 | 2011 OK_{2} | — | July 22, 2011 | Haleakala | Pan-STARRS 1 | · | 700 m | MPC · JPL |
| 530531 | 2011 OL_{5} | — | July 25, 2011 | Siding Spring | SSS | AMO | 280 m | MPC · JPL |
| 530532 | 2011 OP_{7} | — | July 26, 2011 | Haleakala | Pan-STARRS 1 | · | 1.9 km | MPC · JPL |
| 530533 | 2011 OV_{15} | — | July 2, 2011 | Kitt Peak | Spacewatch | · | 4.2 km | MPC · JPL |
| 530534 | 2011 OQ_{16} | — | July 26, 2011 | Haleakala | Pan-STARRS 1 | · | 1.8 km | MPC · JPL |
| 530535 | 2011 OR_{18} | — | November 20, 2001 | Socorro | LINEAR | · | 660 m | MPC · JPL |
| 530536 | 2011 OO_{22} | — | July 21, 2010 | WISE | WISE | · | 3.5 km | MPC · JPL |
| 530537 | 2011 OB_{23} | — | October 22, 2006 | Mount Lemmon | Mount Lemmon Survey | · | 3.5 km | MPC · JPL |
| 530538 | 2011 OV_{36} | — | October 7, 2007 | Mount Lemmon | Mount Lemmon Survey | · | 1.2 km | MPC · JPL |
| 530539 | 2011 OF_{39} | — | July 28, 2011 | Haleakala | Pan-STARRS 1 | L5 | 6.0 km | MPC · JPL |
| 530540 | 2011 OY_{39} | — | July 31, 2011 | Haleakala | Pan-STARRS 1 | · | 640 m | MPC · JPL |
| 530541 | 2011 OG_{45} | — | December 31, 2008 | Kitt Peak | Spacewatch | PHO | 1.0 km | MPC · JPL |
| 530542 | 2011 OV_{52} | — | January 16, 2009 | Mount Lemmon | Mount Lemmon Survey | · | 3.1 km | MPC · JPL |
| 530543 | 2011 OA_{61} | — | July 28, 2011 | Haleakala | Pan-STARRS 1 | · | 1.9 km | MPC · JPL |
| 530544 | 2011 PP_{6} | — | September 9, 2007 | Kitt Peak | Spacewatch | · | 1.4 km | MPC · JPL |
| 530545 | 2011 PX_{11} | — | September 10, 2007 | Mount Lemmon | Mount Lemmon Survey | · | 1.2 km | MPC · JPL |
| 530546 | 2011 PL_{16} | — | August 2, 2011 | Haleakala | Pan-STARRS 1 | EOS | 1.7 km | MPC · JPL |
| 530547 | 2011 PN_{16} | — | August 2, 2011 | Haleakala | Pan-STARRS 1 | EOS | 1.4 km | MPC · JPL |
| 530548 | 2011 QP | — | August 9, 2011 | Haleakala | Pan-STARRS 1 | · | 630 m | MPC · JPL |
| 530549 | 2011 QU | — | December 21, 2008 | Mount Lemmon | Mount Lemmon Survey | · | 510 m | MPC · JPL |
| 530550 | 2011 QB_{2} | — | August 19, 2011 | Haleakala | Pan-STARRS 1 | · | 2.2 km | MPC · JPL |
| 530551 | 2011 QY_{2} | — | July 27, 2011 | La Sagra | OAM | · | 2.4 km | MPC · JPL |
| 530552 | 2011 QV_{3} | — | August 19, 2011 | Haleakala | Pan-STARRS 1 | · | 2.8 km | MPC · JPL |
| 530553 | 2011 QQ_{4} | — | August 19, 2011 | Haleakala | Pan-STARRS 1 | L5 | 7.2 km | MPC · JPL |
| 530554 | 2011 QS_{11} | — | August 22, 2011 | Haleakala | Pan-STARRS 1 | · | 1.3 km | MPC · JPL |
| 530555 | 2011 QZ_{12} | — | August 23, 2011 | Socorro | LINEAR | (1547) | 1.3 km | MPC · JPL |
| 530556 | 2011 QL_{14} | — | July 27, 2011 | Haleakala | Pan-STARRS 1 | · | 730 m | MPC · JPL |
| 530557 | 2011 QQ_{19} | — | August 23, 2011 | Haleakala | Pan-STARRS 1 | · | 2.5 km | MPC · JPL |
| 530558 | 2011 QF_{21} | — | August 25, 2011 | La Sagra | OAM | · | 740 m | MPC · JPL |
| 530559 | 2011 QZ_{24} | — | August 20, 2011 | Haleakala | Pan-STARRS 1 | · | 860 m | MPC · JPL |
| 530560 | 2011 QN_{26} | — | June 5, 2011 | Mount Lemmon | Mount Lemmon Survey | · | 610 m | MPC · JPL |
| 530561 | 2011 QM_{33} | — | August 1, 2011 | Siding Spring | SSS | · | 610 m | MPC · JPL |
| 530562 | 2011 QU_{33} | — | December 25, 2005 | Kitt Peak | Spacewatch | · | 590 m | MPC · JPL |
| 530563 | 2011 QU_{55} | — | October 9, 2007 | Mount Lemmon | Mount Lemmon Survey | · | 1.3 km | MPC · JPL |
| 530564 | 2011 QC_{57} | — | November 6, 2008 | Mount Lemmon | Mount Lemmon Survey | · | 480 m | MPC · JPL |
| 530565 | 2011 QC_{58} | — | August 30, 2011 | Haleakala | Pan-STARRS 1 | NAE | 2.1 km | MPC · JPL |
| 530566 | 2011 QV_{60} | — | August 31, 2011 | Haleakala | Pan-STARRS 1 | · | 500 m | MPC · JPL |
| 530567 | 2011 QL_{63} | — | October 13, 2001 | Kitt Peak | Spacewatch | · | 470 m | MPC · JPL |
| 530568 | 2011 QD_{65} | — | March 13, 1999 | Kitt Peak | Spacewatch | PHO | 940 m | MPC · JPL |
| 530569 | 2011 QU_{83} | — | August 24, 2011 | Haleakala | Pan-STARRS 1 | · | 460 m | MPC · JPL |
| 530570 | 2011 QK_{85} | — | August 24, 2011 | Haleakala | Pan-STARRS 1 | AEO | 790 m | MPC · JPL |
| 530571 | 2011 QB_{89} | — | June 26, 2011 | Mount Lemmon | Mount Lemmon Survey | · | 2.2 km | MPC · JPL |
| 530572 | 2011 QQ_{92} | — | October 3, 2002 | Campo Imperatore | CINEOS | · | 1.5 km | MPC · JPL |
| 530573 | 2011 QG_{95} | — | August 23, 2011 | La Sagra | OAM | · | 740 m | MPC · JPL |
| 530574 | 2011 QD_{98} | — | September 24, 2008 | Mount Lemmon | Mount Lemmon Survey | · | 560 m | MPC · JPL |
| 530575 | 2011 QZ_{99} | — | March 3, 2009 | Mount Lemmon | Mount Lemmon Survey | BRA | 1.6 km | MPC · JPL |
| 530576 | 2011 QG_{100} | — | November 14, 2007 | Kitt Peak | Spacewatch | KOR | 1.4 km | MPC · JPL |
| 530577 | 2011 QJ_{100} | — | August 27, 2011 | Haleakala | Pan-STARRS 1 | · | 2.1 km | MPC · JPL |
| 530578 | 2011 QQ_{100} | — | August 27, 2011 | Haleakala | Pan-STARRS 1 | · | 590 m | MPC · JPL |
| 530579 | 2011 QW_{100} | — | August 30, 2011 | Haleakala | Pan-STARRS 1 | · | 3.0 km | MPC · JPL |
| 530580 | 2011 RL_{4} | — | September 7, 2011 | Kitt Peak | Spacewatch | · | 2.5 km | MPC · JPL |
| 530581 | 2011 RE_{9} | — | September 6, 2011 | Haleakala | Pan-STARRS 1 | · | 1.8 km | MPC · JPL |
| 530582 | 2011 RS_{10} | — | December 21, 2008 | Kitt Peak | Spacewatch | · | 550 m | MPC · JPL |
| 530583 | 2011 RH_{20} | — | October 21, 2006 | Mount Lemmon | Mount Lemmon Survey | EOS | 1.6 km | MPC · JPL |
| 530584 | 2011 RK_{20} | — | March 1, 2009 | Kitt Peak | Spacewatch | · | 2.5 km | MPC · JPL |
| 530585 | 2011 RL_{20} | — | December 19, 2007 | Mount Lemmon | Mount Lemmon Survey | EOS | 1.6 km | MPC · JPL |
| 530586 | 2011 RE_{21} | — | September 4, 2011 | Haleakala | Pan-STARRS 1 | · | 1.5 km | MPC · JPL |
| 530587 | 2011 RQ_{21} | — | September 4, 2011 | Haleakala | Pan-STARRS 1 | · | 1.5 km | MPC · JPL |
| 530588 | 2011 SW_{2} | — | September 17, 2011 | Haleakala | Pan-STARRS 1 | · | 1.8 km | MPC · JPL |
| 530589 | 2011 SO_{3} | — | August 31, 2011 | Haleakala | Pan-STARRS 1 | · | 1.6 km | MPC · JPL |
| 530590 | 2011 SP_{4} | — | September 2, 2011 | Haleakala | Pan-STARRS 1 | V | 520 m | MPC · JPL |
| 530591 | 2011 SO_{16} | — | September 19, 2011 | Mount Lemmon | Mount Lemmon Survey | EOS | 1.9 km | MPC · JPL |
| 530592 | 2011 SN_{24} | — | September 21, 2011 | Catalina | CSS | · | 870 m | MPC · JPL |
| 530593 | 2011 SH_{25} | — | September 21, 2011 | La Sagra | OAM | · | 2.0 km | MPC · JPL |
| 530594 | 2011 SN_{31} | — | September 21, 2011 | Catalina | CSS | · | 1.0 km | MPC · JPL |
| 530595 | 2011 SK_{35} | — | March 26, 2006 | Anderson Mesa | LONEOS | PHO | 970 m | MPC · JPL |
| 530596 | 2011 SV_{36} | — | September 20, 2011 | Kitt Peak | Spacewatch | · | 500 m | MPC · JPL |
| 530597 | 2011 SO_{42} | — | September 18, 2011 | Mount Lemmon | Mount Lemmon Survey | · | 1.5 km | MPC · JPL |
| 530598 | 2011 SE_{49} | — | September 28, 2006 | Catalina | CSS | · | 2.9 km | MPC · JPL |
| 530599 | 2011 SP_{49} | — | August 24, 2011 | La Sagra | OAM | · | 1.9 km | MPC · JPL |
| 530600 | 2011 ST_{50} | — | August 27, 2011 | Haleakala | Pan-STARRS 1 | · | 1.3 km | MPC · JPL |

== 530601–530700 ==
back to top

| Designation | | | Discovery | | | Properties | | Ref |
| Permanent | Provisional | Named after | Date | Site | Discoverer(s) | Category | Diam. | Ref |
|---|---|---|---|---|---|---|---|---|
| 530601 | 2011 SG_{54} | — | September 23, 2011 | Haleakala | Pan-STARRS 1 | · | 500 m | MPC · JPL |
| 530602 | 2011 SH_{56} | — | November 20, 2004 | Kitt Peak | Spacewatch | · | 950 m | MPC · JPL |
| 530603 | 2011 SJ_{56} | — | September 23, 2011 | Haleakala | Pan-STARRS 1 | · | 820 m | MPC · JPL |
| 530604 | 2011 SJ_{62} | — | September 2, 2011 | Haleakala | Pan-STARRS 1 | · | 510 m | MPC · JPL |
| 530605 | 2011 SD_{64} | — | November 22, 2008 | Kitt Peak | Spacewatch | (2076) | 540 m | MPC · JPL |
| 530606 | 2011 SJ_{65} | — | December 31, 2008 | Kitt Peak | Spacewatch | · | 480 m | MPC · JPL |
| 530607 | 2011 SP_{65} | — | September 19, 2011 | Haleakala | Pan-STARRS 1 | · | 2.8 km | MPC · JPL |
| 530608 | 2011 SS_{71} | — | October 14, 2007 | Mount Lemmon | Mount Lemmon Survey | · | 1.6 km | MPC · JPL |
| 530609 | 2011 SG_{72} | — | July 14, 2010 | WISE | WISE | · | 3.1 km | MPC · JPL |
| 530610 | 2011 SB_{78} | — | August 25, 2004 | Kitt Peak | Spacewatch | · | 450 m | MPC · JPL |
| 530611 | 2011 SJ_{83} | — | August 26, 2000 | Socorro | LINEAR | · | 950 m | MPC · JPL |
| 530612 | 2011 SJ_{84} | — | September 21, 2011 | Kitt Peak | Spacewatch | V | 570 m | MPC · JPL |
| 530613 | 2011 SS_{84} | — | October 14, 2004 | Kitt Peak | Spacewatch | · | 470 m | MPC · JPL |
| 530614 | 2011 SE_{86} | — | September 8, 2004 | Socorro | LINEAR | · | 640 m | MPC · JPL |
| 530615 | 2011 SO_{86} | — | July 13, 2010 | WISE | WISE | · | 1.6 km | MPC · JPL |
| 530616 | 2011 SU_{87} | — | September 22, 2011 | Kitt Peak | Spacewatch | · | 860 m | MPC · JPL |
| 530617 | 2011 SB_{88} | — | November 10, 2004 | Kitt Peak | Spacewatch | · | 720 m | MPC · JPL |
| 530618 | 2011 SS_{91} | — | September 9, 2004 | Kitt Peak | Spacewatch | · | 680 m | MPC · JPL |
| 530619 | 2011 SP_{93} | — | October 9, 2004 | Kitt Peak | Spacewatch | · | 680 m | MPC · JPL |
| 530620 | 2011 ST_{93} | — | February 1, 2006 | Kitt Peak | Spacewatch | V | 720 m | MPC · JPL |
| 530621 | 2011 SK_{99} | — | September 8, 2011 | Kitt Peak | Spacewatch | EOS | 1.9 km | MPC · JPL |
| 530622 | 2011 SS_{103} | — | September 15, 2004 | Kitt Peak | Spacewatch | · | 640 m | MPC · JPL |
| 530623 | 2011 SW_{103} | — | October 23, 2004 | Kitt Peak | Spacewatch | · | 910 m | MPC · JPL |
| 530624 | 2011 SP_{106} | — | June 11, 2011 | Haleakala | Pan-STARRS 1 | · | 1.1 km | MPC · JPL |
| 530625 | 2011 SF_{107} | — | September 13, 2004 | Kitt Peak | Spacewatch | · | 550 m | MPC · JPL |
| 530626 | 2011 SH_{111} | — | September 24, 1960 | Palomar | C. J. van Houten, I. van Houten-Groeneveld, T. Gehrels | · | 590 m | MPC · JPL |
| 530627 | 2011 SW_{111} | — | February 2, 2006 | Mount Lemmon | Mount Lemmon Survey | · | 980 m | MPC · JPL |
| 530628 | 2011 SX_{114} | — | September 21, 2011 | Kitt Peak | Spacewatch | · | 830 m | MPC · JPL |
| 530629 | 2011 SF_{118} | — | March 14, 2010 | Mount Lemmon | Mount Lemmon Survey | · | 1.2 km | MPC · JPL |
| 530630 | 2011 SN_{119} | — | December 29, 2008 | Mount Lemmon | Mount Lemmon Survey | · | 760 m | MPC · JPL |
| 530631 | 2011 SZ_{127} | — | September 20, 2011 | Kitt Peak | Spacewatch | · | 630 m | MPC · JPL |
| 530632 | 2011 SS_{146} | — | September 26, 2011 | Mount Lemmon | Mount Lemmon Survey | · | 1.8 km | MPC · JPL |
| 530633 | 2011 SC_{151} | — | December 30, 2008 | Kitt Peak | Spacewatch | · | 480 m | MPC · JPL |
| 530634 | 2011 SP_{156} | — | February 12, 2004 | Kitt Peak | Spacewatch | KOR | 1.5 km | MPC · JPL |
| 530635 | 2011 SQ_{159} | — | April 5, 2010 | Kitt Peak | Spacewatch | · | 980 m | MPC · JPL |
| 530636 | 2011 SJ_{160} | — | September 20, 2011 | Catalina | CSS | V | 620 m | MPC · JPL |
| 530637 | 2011 SN_{162} | — | December 21, 2008 | Kitt Peak | Spacewatch | V | 540 m | MPC · JPL |
| 530638 | 2011 SF_{165} | — | September 23, 2011 | Mount Lemmon | Mount Lemmon Survey | · | 820 m | MPC · JPL |
| 530639 | 2011 SQ_{165} | — | September 24, 2011 | La Sagra | OAM | · | 1.8 km | MPC · JPL |
| 530640 | 2011 SB_{169} | — | September 28, 2011 | Mount Lemmon | Mount Lemmon Survey | KOR | 1.1 km | MPC · JPL |
| 530641 | 2011 SV_{170} | — | October 15, 2004 | Mount Lemmon | Mount Lemmon Survey | · | 820 m | MPC · JPL |
| 530642 | 2011 SO_{173} | — | September 5, 2011 | La Sagra | OAM | · | 970 m | MPC · JPL |
| 530643 | 2011 SQ_{174} | — | October 8, 2004 | Anderson Mesa | LONEOS | · | 920 m | MPC · JPL |
| 530644 | 2011 SO_{181} | — | September 26, 2011 | Kitt Peak | Spacewatch | · | 670 m | MPC · JPL |
| 530645 | 2011 SA_{184} | — | September 26, 2011 | Kitt Peak | Spacewatch | · | 720 m | MPC · JPL |
| 530646 | 2011 SB_{184} | — | September 26, 2011 | Kitt Peak | Spacewatch | · | 900 m | MPC · JPL |
| 530647 | 2011 SJ_{185} | — | September 26, 2011 | Kitt Peak | Spacewatch | · | 540 m | MPC · JPL |
| 530648 | 2011 SK_{195} | — | September 2, 2011 | Haleakala | Pan-STARRS 1 | · | 1.6 km | MPC · JPL |
| 530649 | 2011 SJ_{205} | — | December 30, 2008 | Kitt Peak | Spacewatch | · | 560 m | MPC · JPL |
| 530650 | 2011 SF_{210} | — | September 20, 2011 | Mount Lemmon | Mount Lemmon Survey | · | 550 m | MPC · JPL |
| 530651 | 2011 SO_{217} | — | February 27, 2008 | Mount Lemmon | Mount Lemmon Survey | · | 2.4 km | MPC · JPL |
| 530652 | 2011 SJ_{225} | — | January 26, 2006 | Mount Lemmon | Mount Lemmon Survey | · | 830 m | MPC · JPL |
| 530653 | 2011 SY_{227} | — | September 29, 2011 | Mount Lemmon | Mount Lemmon Survey | EOS | 1.8 km | MPC · JPL |
| 530654 | 2011 SR_{229} | — | October 30, 2007 | Kitt Peak | Spacewatch | · | 2.0 km | MPC · JPL |
| 530655 | 2011 SW_{230} | — | October 7, 2004 | Kitt Peak | Spacewatch | · | 650 m | MPC · JPL |
| 530656 | 2011 SX_{254} | — | August 25, 2011 | La Sagra | OAM | · | 920 m | MPC · JPL |
| 530657 | 2011 SB_{256} | — | June 11, 2011 | Haleakala | Pan-STARRS 1 | TEL | 1.6 km | MPC · JPL |
| 530658 | 2011 SX_{256} | — | September 21, 2011 | Mount Lemmon | Mount Lemmon Survey | · | 3.1 km | MPC · JPL |
| 530659 | 2011 SO_{259} | — | September 11, 2007 | Mount Lemmon | Mount Lemmon Survey | NYS | 870 m | MPC · JPL |
| 530660 | 2011 SS_{259} | — | September 28, 2011 | Kitt Peak | Spacewatch | · | 3.0 km | MPC · JPL |
| 530661 | 2011 SY_{260} | — | September 20, 2011 | Kitt Peak | Spacewatch | · | 550 m | MPC · JPL |
| 530662 | 2011 SR_{261} | — | September 26, 2011 | Mount Lemmon | Mount Lemmon Survey | · | 420 m | MPC · JPL |
| 530663 | 2011 SW_{275} | — | September 20, 2011 | Kitt Peak | Spacewatch | HYG | 3.0 km | MPC · JPL |
| 530664 | 2011 SO_{277} | — | September 26, 2011 | Haleakala | Pan-STARRS 1 | NT | 158 km | MPC · JPL |
| 530665 | 2011 SE_{278} | — | September 16, 2006 | Catalina | CSS | NAE | 3.1 km | MPC · JPL |
| 530666 | 2011 SU_{278} | — | September 28, 2011 | Mount Lemmon | Mount Lemmon Survey | · | 730 m | MPC · JPL |
| 530667 | 2011 SW_{278} | — | September 30, 2006 | Kitt Peak | Spacewatch | KOR | 1.1 km | MPC · JPL |
| 530668 | 2011 SX_{278} | — | September 17, 2001 | Kitt Peak | Spacewatch | (16286) | 1.7 km | MPC · JPL |
| 530669 | 2011 SO_{279} | — | September 24, 2011 | Mount Lemmon | Mount Lemmon Survey | · | 1.6 km | MPC · JPL |
| 530670 | 2011 SE_{280} | — | September 25, 2011 | Haleakala | Pan-STARRS 1 | · | 1.5 km | MPC · JPL |
| 530671 | 2011 ST_{280} | — | September 21, 2011 | Catalina | CSS | (2076) | 730 m | MPC · JPL |
| 530672 | 2011 SZ_{280} | — | August 31, 1995 | Kitt Peak | Spacewatch | · | 2.2 km | MPC · JPL |
| 530673 | 2011 SC_{281} | — | September 23, 2011 | Haleakala | Pan-STARRS 1 | · | 2.5 km | MPC · JPL |
| 530674 | 2011 SF_{281} | — | September 24, 2011 | Haleakala | Pan-STARRS 1 | · | 2.4 km | MPC · JPL |
| 530675 | 2011 SH_{281} | — | September 26, 2011 | Kitt Peak | Spacewatch | · | 2.3 km | MPC · JPL |
| 530676 | 2011 SL_{281} | — | November 20, 2006 | Mount Lemmon | Mount Lemmon Survey | · | 3.2 km | MPC · JPL |
| 530677 | 2011 SM_{281} | — | September 18, 2011 | Mount Lemmon | Mount Lemmon Survey | · | 1.7 km | MPC · JPL |
| 530678 | 2011 SO_{281} | — | September 23, 2011 | Haleakala | Pan-STARRS 1 | · | 760 m | MPC · JPL |
| 530679 | 2011 TL_{15} | — | September 19, 2011 | Haleakala | Pan-STARRS 1 | · | 940 m | MPC · JPL |
| 530680 | 2011 UT_{2} | — | December 5, 2008 | Mount Lemmon | Mount Lemmon Survey | · | 690 m | MPC · JPL |
| 530681 | 2011 UB_{3} | — | September 14, 2004 | Socorro | LINEAR | · | 700 m | MPC · JPL |
| 530682 | 2011 UN_{3} | — | September 28, 2011 | Mount Lemmon | Mount Lemmon Survey | · | 700 m | MPC · JPL |
| 530683 | 2011 UH_{6} | — | October 18, 2011 | Mount Lemmon | Mount Lemmon Survey | · | 550 m | MPC · JPL |
| 530684 | 2011 UM_{7} | — | December 18, 2001 | Socorro | LINEAR | · | 600 m | MPC · JPL |
| 530685 | 2011 UX_{10} | — | March 19, 2009 | Mount Lemmon | Mount Lemmon Survey | · | 1.7 km | MPC · JPL |
| 530686 | 2011 UV_{15} | — | October 18, 2011 | Kitt Peak | Spacewatch | · | 620 m | MPC · JPL |
| 530687 | 2011 UZ_{15} | — | April 4, 2010 | Kitt Peak | Spacewatch | · | 1.5 km | MPC · JPL |
| 530688 | 2011 UE_{16} | — | March 27, 2003 | Kitt Peak | Spacewatch | · | 2.4 km | MPC · JPL |
| 530689 | 2011 UC_{19} | — | September 23, 2011 | Haleakala | Pan-STARRS 1 | (1338) (FLO) | 580 m | MPC · JPL |
| 530690 | 2011 UM_{25} | — | October 9, 2004 | Kitt Peak | Spacewatch | · | 550 m | MPC · JPL |
| 530691 | 2011 UG_{26} | — | October 17, 2011 | Kitt Peak | Spacewatch | · | 1.2 km | MPC · JPL |
| 530692 | 2011 UU_{26} | — | October 17, 2011 | Kitt Peak | Spacewatch | · | 800 m | MPC · JPL |
| 530693 | 2011 UB_{27} | — | October 5, 2004 | Anderson Mesa | LONEOS | · | 690 m | MPC · JPL |
| 530694 | 2011 UY_{27} | — | October 17, 2011 | Kitt Peak | Spacewatch | · | 890 m | MPC · JPL |
| 530695 | 2011 UB_{28} | — | October 17, 2011 | Kitt Peak | Spacewatch | · | 2.7 km | MPC · JPL |
| 530696 | 2011 UG_{38} | — | October 20, 2011 | Mount Lemmon | Mount Lemmon Survey | · | 660 m | MPC · JPL |
| 530697 | 2011 UZ_{44} | — | September 30, 2011 | Kitt Peak | Spacewatch | · | 580 m | MPC · JPL |
| 530698 | 2011 UE_{46} | — | September 28, 2011 | Kitt Peak | Spacewatch | · | 700 m | MPC · JPL |
| 530699 | 2011 UT_{49} | — | September 22, 2011 | Mount Lemmon | Mount Lemmon Survey | MAS | 660 m | MPC · JPL |
| 530700 | 2011 UO_{51} | — | November 19, 2006 | Kitt Peak | Spacewatch | · | 2.0 km | MPC · JPL |

== 530701–530800 ==
back to top

| Designation | | | Discovery | | | Properties | | Ref |
| Permanent | Provisional | Named after | Date | Site | Discoverer(s) | Category | Diam. | Ref |
|---|---|---|---|---|---|---|---|---|
| 530701 | 2011 UY_{51} | — | October 18, 2011 | Kitt Peak | Spacewatch | · | 570 m | MPC · JPL |
| 530702 | 2011 UH_{52} | — | October 18, 2011 | Kitt Peak | Spacewatch | NYS | 910 m | MPC · JPL |
| 530703 | 2011 UM_{52} | — | October 18, 2011 | Kitt Peak | Spacewatch | · | 3.5 km | MPC · JPL |
| 530704 | 2011 UX_{54} | — | October 18, 2011 | Mount Lemmon | Mount Lemmon Survey | · | 570 m | MPC · JPL |
| 530705 | 2011 UR_{57} | — | September 21, 2011 | Kitt Peak | Spacewatch | NYS | 870 m | MPC · JPL |
| 530706 | 2011 UV_{62} | — | October 20, 2011 | Haleakala | Pan-STARRS 1 | · | 1.1 km | MPC · JPL |
| 530707 | 2011 UK_{64} | — | November 4, 2004 | Catalina | CSS | PHO | 650 m | MPC · JPL |
| 530708 | 2011 UD_{73} | — | October 18, 2011 | Mount Lemmon | Mount Lemmon Survey | EOS | 1.5 km | MPC · JPL |
| 530709 | 2011 UZ_{74} | — | November 20, 2004 | Kitt Peak | Spacewatch | · | 860 m | MPC · JPL |
| 530710 | 2011 UP_{75} | — | October 19, 2011 | Kitt Peak | Spacewatch | · | 3.2 km | MPC · JPL |
| 530711 | 2011 UY_{76} | — | October 19, 2011 | Kitt Peak | Spacewatch | · | 700 m | MPC · JPL |
| 530712 | 2011 UD_{79} | — | June 24, 2000 | Kitt Peak | Spacewatch | · | 820 m | MPC · JPL |
| 530713 | 2011 UG_{79} | — | October 19, 2011 | Kitt Peak | Spacewatch | EUP | 2.7 km | MPC · JPL |
| 530714 | 2011 UD_{80} | — | October 19, 2011 | Kitt Peak | Spacewatch | · | 1.6 km | MPC · JPL |
| 530715 | 2011 UT_{81} | — | September 23, 2011 | Mount Lemmon | Mount Lemmon Survey | NYS | 800 m | MPC · JPL |
| 530716 | 2011 UX_{83} | — | September 3, 2007 | Catalina | CSS | · | 990 m | MPC · JPL |
| 530717 | 2011 UH_{84} | — | September 29, 2000 | Kitt Peak | Spacewatch | ERI | 1.0 km | MPC · JPL |
| 530718 | 2011 UJ_{85} | — | September 27, 2011 | Mount Lemmon | Mount Lemmon Survey | · | 780 m | MPC · JPL |
| 530719 | 2011 UL_{85} | — | October 19, 2011 | Kitt Peak | Spacewatch | · | 520 m | MPC · JPL |
| 530720 | 2011 UU_{85} | — | October 20, 2011 | Mount Lemmon | Mount Lemmon Survey | · | 1.7 km | MPC · JPL |
| 530721 Isscas | 2011 UH_{88} | Isscas | September 11, 2007 | XuYi | PMO NEO Survey Program | · | 1.0 km | MPC · JPL |
| 530722 | 2011 UH_{89} | — | September 4, 2007 | Mount Lemmon | Mount Lemmon Survey | NYS | 910 m | MPC · JPL |
| 530723 | 2011 UY_{89} | — | October 21, 2011 | Mount Lemmon | Mount Lemmon Survey | · | 600 m | MPC · JPL |
| 530724 | 2011 UA_{90} | — | October 21, 2011 | Mount Lemmon | Mount Lemmon Survey | · | 730 m | MPC · JPL |
| 530725 | 2011 UD_{90} | — | September 30, 2011 | Kitt Peak | Spacewatch | · | 590 m | MPC · JPL |
| 530726 | 2011 UL_{90} | — | December 7, 2001 | Socorro | LINEAR | PHO | 1.1 km | MPC · JPL |
| 530727 | 2011 UM_{90} | — | October 3, 2011 | Mount Lemmon | Mount Lemmon Survey | · | 720 m | MPC · JPL |
| 530728 | 2011 UE_{92} | — | September 23, 2011 | Kitt Peak | Spacewatch | · | 760 m | MPC · JPL |
| 530729 | 2011 UO_{97} | — | February 13, 2008 | Mount Lemmon | Mount Lemmon Survey | · | 1.9 km | MPC · JPL |
| 530730 | 2011 UY_{97} | — | October 19, 2011 | Mount Lemmon | Mount Lemmon Survey | · | 1.1 km | MPC · JPL |
| 530731 | 2011 UZ_{101} | — | October 20, 2011 | Mount Lemmon | Mount Lemmon Survey | PHO | 640 m | MPC · JPL |
| 530732 | 2011 UZ_{102} | — | October 1, 2011 | Mount Lemmon | Mount Lemmon Survey | V | 480 m | MPC · JPL |
| 530733 | 2011 UH_{110} | — | September 21, 2011 | Kitt Peak | Spacewatch | · | 970 m | MPC · JPL |
| 530734 | 2011 UG_{117} | — | September 21, 2011 | Kitt Peak | Spacewatch | · | 660 m | MPC · JPL |
| 530735 | 2011 UU_{118} | — | January 1, 2009 | Kitt Peak | Spacewatch | · | 540 m | MPC · JPL |
| 530736 | 2011 UN_{119} | — | October 4, 2004 | Kitt Peak | Spacewatch | · | 510 m | MPC · JPL |
| 530737 | 2011 UP_{119} | — | September 22, 2011 | Kitt Peak | Spacewatch | · | 610 m | MPC · JPL |
| 530738 | 2011 UB_{124} | — | September 23, 2011 | Haleakala | Pan-STARRS 1 | · | 670 m | MPC · JPL |
| 530739 Nanligong | 2011 UL_{124} | Nanligong | October 3, 2011 | XuYi | PMO NEO Survey Program | · | 3.2 km | MPC · JPL |
| 530740 | 2011 UJ_{127} | — | November 4, 2004 | Kitt Peak | Spacewatch | · | 550 m | MPC · JPL |
| 530741 | 2011 US_{129} | — | October 21, 2011 | Mount Lemmon | Mount Lemmon Survey | · | 920 m | MPC · JPL |
| 530742 | 2011 UJ_{130} | — | January 30, 2006 | Kitt Peak | Spacewatch | · | 450 m | MPC · JPL |
| 530743 | 2011 UA_{131} | — | October 23, 2011 | Haleakala | Pan-STARRS 1 | AMO +1km | 980 m | MPC · JPL |
| 530744 | 2011 UQ_{135} | — | September 21, 2000 | Kitt Peak | Spacewatch | · | 920 m | MPC · JPL |
| 530745 | 2011 UR_{135} | — | September 23, 2011 | Kitt Peak | Spacewatch | · | 600 m | MPC · JPL |
| 530746 | 2011 UE_{136} | — | November 18, 2001 | Kitt Peak | Deep Lens Survey | · | 3.2 km | MPC · JPL |
| 530747 | 2011 UO_{138} | — | January 29, 2009 | Kitt Peak | Spacewatch | · | 850 m | MPC · JPL |
| 530748 | 2011 UO_{142} | — | October 23, 2011 | Kitt Peak | Spacewatch | V | 620 m | MPC · JPL |
| 530749 | 2011 UW_{144} | — | September 24, 2011 | Mount Lemmon | Mount Lemmon Survey | · | 430 m | MPC · JPL |
| 530750 | 2011 UA_{146} | — | September 24, 2011 | Mount Lemmon | Mount Lemmon Survey | · | 450 m | MPC · JPL |
| 530751 | 2011 UM_{149} | — | October 8, 2004 | Socorro | LINEAR | · | 600 m | MPC · JPL |
| 530752 | 2011 UK_{152} | — | October 20, 2011 | Mount Lemmon | Mount Lemmon Survey | · | 720 m | MPC · JPL |
| 530753 | 2011 UU_{152} | — | October 21, 2011 | Mount Lemmon | Mount Lemmon Survey | · | 820 m | MPC · JPL |
| 530754 | 2011 UX_{154} | — | October 23, 2011 | Kitt Peak | Spacewatch | · | 630 m | MPC · JPL |
| 530755 | 2011 UO_{157} | — | September 4, 2007 | Catalina | CSS | NYS | 980 m | MPC · JPL |
| 530756 | 2011 UQ_{159} | — | October 12, 2004 | Socorro | LINEAR | · | 840 m | MPC · JPL |
| 530757 | 2011 UY_{160} | — | October 21, 2011 | Mount Lemmon | Mount Lemmon Survey | PHO | 770 m | MPC · JPL |
| 530758 | 2011 UJ_{161} | — | September 27, 2011 | Mount Lemmon | Mount Lemmon Survey | · | 960 m | MPC · JPL |
| 530759 | 2011 UO_{163} | — | September 27, 2011 | Mount Lemmon | Mount Lemmon Survey | NYS | 780 m | MPC · JPL |
| 530760 | 2011 UT_{163} | — | September 23, 2011 | Mount Lemmon | Mount Lemmon Survey | · | 800 m | MPC · JPL |
| 530761 | 2011 UF_{173} | — | March 19, 2009 | Mount Lemmon | Mount Lemmon Survey | · | 3.4 km | MPC · JPL |
| 530762 | 2011 UU_{180} | — | September 22, 2011 | Mount Lemmon | Mount Lemmon Survey | · | 2.8 km | MPC · JPL |
| 530763 | 2011 UG_{181} | — | October 24, 2011 | Haleakala | Pan-STARRS 1 | · | 590 m | MPC · JPL |
| 530764 | 2011 UD_{184} | — | September 21, 2011 | Kitt Peak | Spacewatch | · | 570 m | MPC · JPL |
| 530765 | 2011 UH_{185} | — | October 25, 2011 | Haleakala | Pan-STARRS 1 | · | 750 m | MPC · JPL |
| 530766 | 2011 UG_{188} | — | September 5, 2011 | La Sagra | OAM | · | 610 m | MPC · JPL |
| 530767 | 2011 US_{192} | — | September 20, 2011 | Mount Lemmon | Mount Lemmon Survey | · | 540 m | MPC · JPL |
| 530768 Nanpu | 2011 UD_{194} | Nanpu | October 3, 2011 | XuYi | PMO NEO Survey Program | · | 630 m | MPC · JPL |
| 530769 | 2011 UW_{196} | — | October 21, 2011 | Kitt Peak | Spacewatch | · | 2.7 km | MPC · JPL |
| 530770 | 2011 UZ_{196} | — | October 24, 2011 | Haleakala | Pan-STARRS 1 | (1338) (FLO) | 500 m | MPC · JPL |
| 530771 | 2011 UA_{199} | — | October 25, 2011 | Kitt Peak | Spacewatch | · | 580 m | MPC · JPL |
| 530772 | 2011 UD_{201} | — | August 7, 2010 | WISE | WISE | · | 2.7 km | MPC · JPL |
| 530773 | 2011 UO_{202} | — | October 26, 2011 | Haleakala | Pan-STARRS 1 | · | 610 m | MPC · JPL |
| 530774 | 2011 UP_{202} | — | October 19, 2011 | Mount Lemmon | Mount Lemmon Survey | · | 2.3 km | MPC · JPL |
| 530775 | 2011 UF_{203} | — | October 26, 2011 | Haleakala | Pan-STARRS 1 | · | 920 m | MPC · JPL |
| 530776 | 2011 UM_{210} | — | December 21, 2008 | Mount Lemmon | Mount Lemmon Survey | · | 400 m | MPC · JPL |
| 530777 | 2011 US_{225} | — | August 27, 2006 | Kitt Peak | Spacewatch | AGN | 810 m | MPC · JPL |
| 530778 | 2011 UQ_{235} | — | October 6, 2004 | Kitt Peak | Spacewatch | · | 710 m | MPC · JPL |
| 530779 | 2011 US_{236} | — | October 24, 2011 | Haleakala | Pan-STARRS 1 | V | 540 m | MPC · JPL |
| 530780 | 2011 UP_{238} | — | September 3, 2007 | Catalina | CSS | · | 1.2 km | MPC · JPL |
| 530781 | 2011 UB_{242} | — | October 25, 2011 | Haleakala | Pan-STARRS 1 | · | 1.0 km | MPC · JPL |
| 530782 | 2011 UC_{242} | — | October 3, 2011 | Mount Lemmon | Mount Lemmon Survey | · | 480 m | MPC · JPL |
| 530783 | 2011 UM_{243} | — | October 25, 2011 | Haleakala | Pan-STARRS 1 | · | 920 m | MPC · JPL |
| 530784 | 2011 UJ_{244} | — | October 25, 2011 | Haleakala | Pan-STARRS 1 | V | 620 m | MPC · JPL |
| 530785 | 2011 UM_{249} | — | November 20, 2001 | Socorro | LINEAR | · | 580 m | MPC · JPL |
| 530786 | 2011 UM_{252} | — | September 24, 2004 | Kitt Peak | Spacewatch | · | 370 m | MPC · JPL |
| 530787 | 2011 UF_{255} | — | June 14, 2007 | Kitt Peak | Spacewatch | · | 920 m | MPC · JPL |
| 530788 | 2011 UW_{259} | — | October 24, 2011 | Haleakala | Pan-STARRS 1 | · | 780 m | MPC · JPL |
| 530789 | 2011 UB_{263} | — | October 26, 2005 | Kitt Peak | Spacewatch | · | 2.3 km | MPC · JPL |
| 530790 | 2011 UN_{265} | — | October 26, 2011 | Haleakala | Pan-STARRS 1 | · | 1.1 km | MPC · JPL |
| 530791 | 2011 UO_{265} | — | October 18, 2011 | Kitt Peak | Spacewatch | · | 880 m | MPC · JPL |
| 530792 | 2011 UG_{266} | — | October 26, 2011 | Haleakala | Pan-STARRS 1 | · | 910 m | MPC · JPL |
| 530793 | 2011 UY_{266} | — | November 17, 2006 | Kitt Peak | Spacewatch | · | 3.0 km | MPC · JPL |
| 530794 | 2011 UP_{267} | — | October 27, 2011 | Kitt Peak | Spacewatch | · | 550 m | MPC · JPL |
| 530795 | 2011 UV_{267} | — | October 27, 2011 | Mount Lemmon | Mount Lemmon Survey | 3:2 · SHU | 5.3 km | MPC · JPL |
| 530796 | 2011 UL_{271} | — | September 19, 2011 | Haleakala | Pan-STARRS 1 | · | 610 m | MPC · JPL |
| 530797 | 2011 UZ_{273} | — | October 16, 2011 | Kitt Peak | Spacewatch | · | 3.2 km | MPC · JPL |
| 530798 | 2011 UJ_{275} | — | October 19, 2011 | Kitt Peak | Spacewatch | · | 630 m | MPC · JPL |
| 530799 | 2011 UX_{277} | — | October 27, 2005 | Kitt Peak | Spacewatch | · | 2.4 km | MPC · JPL |
| 530800 | 2011 UV_{278} | — | October 24, 2011 | Kitt Peak | Spacewatch | · | 840 m | MPC · JPL |

== 530801–530900 ==
back to top

| Designation | | | Discovery | | | Properties | | Ref |
| Permanent | Provisional | Named after | Date | Site | Discoverer(s) | Category | Diam. | Ref |
|---|---|---|---|---|---|---|---|---|
| 530801 | 2011 UF_{279} | — | October 25, 2011 | Haleakala | Pan-STARRS 1 | · | 680 m | MPC · JPL |
| 530802 | 2011 UK_{279} | — | October 25, 2011 | Haleakala | Pan-STARRS 1 | · | 1.2 km | MPC · JPL |
| 530803 | 2011 UD_{284} | — | September 14, 2007 | Mount Lemmon | Mount Lemmon Survey | · | 1.0 km | MPC · JPL |
| 530804 | 2011 UB_{294} | — | November 23, 1997 | Kitt Peak | Spacewatch | · | 480 m | MPC · JPL |
| 530805 | 2011 UF_{294} | — | October 26, 2011 | Haleakala | Pan-STARRS 1 | · | 500 m | MPC · JPL |
| 530806 | 2011 UB_{316} | — | October 30, 2011 | Kitt Peak | Spacewatch | EOS | 1.7 km | MPC · JPL |
| 530807 | 2011 UG_{316} | — | October 30, 2011 | Kitt Peak | Spacewatch | · | 640 m | MPC · JPL |
| 530808 | 2011 UL_{316} | — | October 30, 2011 | Kitt Peak | Spacewatch | EOS | 1.8 km | MPC · JPL |
| 530809 | 2011 UZ_{317} | — | September 24, 2011 | Mount Lemmon | Mount Lemmon Survey | · | 1.0 km | MPC · JPL |
| 530810 | 2011 UE_{319} | — | September 24, 2011 | Mount Lemmon | Mount Lemmon Survey | LIX | 2.7 km | MPC · JPL |
| 530811 | 2011 UE_{320} | — | September 3, 2007 | Catalina | CSS | NYS | 800 m | MPC · JPL |
| 530812 | 2011 UR_{320} | — | November 3, 2004 | Kitt Peak | Spacewatch | · | 650 m | MPC · JPL |
| 530813 | 2011 UL_{326} | — | September 25, 2011 | Haleakala | Pan-STARRS 1 | EOS | 1.9 km | MPC · JPL |
| 530814 | 2011 UN_{326} | — | October 20, 2011 | Kitt Peak | Spacewatch | · | 1.1 km | MPC · JPL |
| 530815 | 2011 UY_{331} | — | October 25, 2011 | Haleakala | Pan-STARRS 1 | · | 740 m | MPC · JPL |
| 530816 | 2011 UK_{332} | — | September 26, 2011 | Haleakala | Pan-STARRS 1 | · | 700 m | MPC · JPL |
| 530817 | 2011 UB_{335} | — | September 21, 2011 | Kitt Peak | Spacewatch | · | 500 m | MPC · JPL |
| 530818 | 2011 UY_{336} | — | January 29, 2009 | Kitt Peak | Spacewatch | · | 560 m | MPC · JPL |
| 530819 | 2011 UM_{339} | — | February 1, 2009 | Mount Lemmon | Mount Lemmon Survey | · | 680 m | MPC · JPL |
| 530820 | 2011 UG_{346} | — | October 19, 2011 | Mount Lemmon | Mount Lemmon Survey | PHO | 740 m | MPC · JPL |
| 530821 | 2011 UH_{352} | — | November 8, 2008 | Mount Lemmon | Mount Lemmon Survey | · | 770 m | MPC · JPL |
| 530822 | 2011 UY_{362} | — | October 12, 2004 | Kitt Peak | Spacewatch | · | 430 m | MPC · JPL |
| 530823 | 2011 UD_{364} | — | October 7, 2004 | Kitt Peak | Spacewatch | · | 470 m | MPC · JPL |
| 530824 | 2011 UN_{368} | — | August 20, 2000 | Kitt Peak | Spacewatch | · | 610 m | MPC · JPL |
| 530825 | 2011 UZ_{368} | — | September 24, 2005 | Kitt Peak | Spacewatch | LUT | 2.8 km | MPC · JPL |
| 530826 | 2011 UZ_{374} | — | August 31, 2005 | Kitt Peak | Spacewatch | · | 2.9 km | MPC · JPL |
| 530827 | 2011 UM_{377} | — | September 21, 2011 | Kitt Peak | Spacewatch | · | 860 m | MPC · JPL |
| 530828 | 2011 UU_{380} | — | September 25, 2011 | Haleakala | Pan-STARRS 1 | · | 530 m | MPC · JPL |
| 530829 | 2011 UW_{387} | — | February 2, 2009 | Mount Lemmon | Mount Lemmon Survey | · | 890 m | MPC · JPL |
| 530830 | 2011 UJ_{388} | — | October 25, 2011 | Haleakala | Pan-STARRS 1 | · | 780 m | MPC · JPL |
| 530831 | 2011 UP_{390} | — | September 24, 2011 | Mount Lemmon | Mount Lemmon Survey | NYS | 740 m | MPC · JPL |
| 530832 | 2011 UD_{392} | — | October 27, 2011 | Mount Lemmon | Mount Lemmon Survey | · | 840 m | MPC · JPL |
| 530833 | 2011 UE_{398} | — | September 15, 2007 | Kitt Peak | Spacewatch | · | 870 m | MPC · JPL |
| 530834 | 2011 UX_{399} | — | December 1, 2008 | Mount Lemmon | Mount Lemmon Survey | · | 550 m | MPC · JPL |
| 530835 | 2011 UH_{400} | — | September 7, 2002 | Campo Imperatore | CINEOS | · | 1.2 km | MPC · JPL |
| 530836 | 2011 UL_{401} | — | October 19, 2011 | Kitt Peak | Spacewatch | EOS | 1.6 km | MPC · JPL |
| 530837 | 2011 UN_{406} | — | September 21, 2011 | Catalina | CSS | · | 2.9 km | MPC · JPL |
| 530838 | 2011 UC_{411} | — | October 26, 2011 | Mauna Kea | M. Alexandersen, B. J. Gladman, J. J. Kavelaars | plutino | 121 km | MPC · JPL |
| 530839 | 2011 UK_{411} | — | October 7, 2010 | Haleakala | Pan-STARRS 1 | res · 3:5 | 156 km | MPC · JPL |
| 530840 | 2011 UJ_{414} | — | November 24, 2006 | Mount Lemmon | Mount Lemmon Survey | · | 2.3 km | MPC · JPL |
| 530841 | 2011 UK_{414} | — | November 18, 2006 | Mount Lemmon | Mount Lemmon Survey | EOS | 1.7 km | MPC · JPL |
| 530842 | 2011 UR_{414} | — | April 30, 2009 | Kitt Peak | Spacewatch | · | 2.6 km | MPC · JPL |
| 530843 | 2011 UT_{414} | — | October 25, 2011 | Haleakala | Pan-STARRS 1 | · | 1.7 km | MPC · JPL |
| 530844 | 2011 UU_{414} | — | February 2, 2008 | Mount Lemmon | Mount Lemmon Survey | KOR | 1.2 km | MPC · JPL |
| 530845 | 2011 UN_{415} | — | October 21, 2011 | Mount Lemmon | Mount Lemmon Survey | · | 3.3 km | MPC · JPL |
| 530846 | 2011 UE_{416} | — | October 24, 2011 | Kitt Peak | Spacewatch | EOS | 1.3 km | MPC · JPL |
| 530847 | 2011 UX_{416} | — | October 1, 2005 | Kitt Peak | Spacewatch | · | 2.7 km | MPC · JPL |
| 530848 | 2011 UY_{416} | — | October 24, 2011 | Haleakala | Pan-STARRS 1 | · | 1.3 km | MPC · JPL |
| 530849 | 2011 UY_{417} | — | October 19, 2011 | Mount Lemmon | Mount Lemmon Survey | · | 640 m | MPC · JPL |
| 530850 | 2011 UZ_{417} | — | October 20, 2011 | Mount Lemmon | Mount Lemmon Survey | · | 2.7 km | MPC · JPL |
| 530851 | 2011 UA_{418} | — | October 23, 2011 | Haleakala | Pan-STARRS 1 | · | 1.2 km | MPC · JPL |
| 530852 | 2011 UE_{418} | — | October 26, 2011 | Haleakala | Pan-STARRS 1 | · | 790 m | MPC · JPL |
| 530853 | 2011 UJ_{418} | — | October 25, 2011 | Haleakala | Pan-STARRS 1 | EOS | 1.8 km | MPC · JPL |
| 530854 | 2011 UL_{418} | — | November 19, 2006 | Catalina | CSS | · | 1.8 km | MPC · JPL |
| 530855 | 2011 UM_{418} | — | October 26, 2011 | Haleakala | Pan-STARRS 1 | TIR | 2.4 km | MPC · JPL |
| 530856 | 2011 UO_{418} | — | October 26, 2011 | Haleakala | Pan-STARRS 1 | EOS | 1.8 km | MPC · JPL |
| 530857 | 2011 US_{418} | — | October 1, 2011 | Kitt Peak | Spacewatch | · | 2.3 km | MPC · JPL |
| 530858 | 2011 UY_{418} | — | October 25, 2011 | Haleakala | Pan-STARRS 1 | V | 540 m | MPC · JPL |
| 530859 | 2011 UC_{419} | — | October 26, 2011 | Haleakala | Pan-STARRS 1 | · | 690 m | MPC · JPL |
| 530860 | 2011 UD_{419} | — | October 28, 2011 | Catalina | CSS | · | 1.0 km | MPC · JPL |
| 530861 | 2011 VN_{6} | — | October 25, 2011 | Haleakala | Pan-STARRS 1 | · | 2.3 km | MPC · JPL |
| 530862 | 2011 VB_{8} | — | October 25, 2011 | Haleakala | Pan-STARRS 1 | · | 2.6 km | MPC · JPL |
| 530863 | 2011 VT_{10} | — | October 26, 2011 | Haleakala | Pan-STARRS 1 | · | 1.1 km | MPC · JPL |
| 530864 | 2011 VX_{10} | — | November 15, 2011 | Kitt Peak | Spacewatch | · | 630 m | MPC · JPL |
| 530865 | 2011 VR_{12} | — | January 15, 2009 | Kitt Peak | Spacewatch | · | 1.2 km | MPC · JPL |
| 530866 | 2011 VX_{16} | — | December 16, 2000 | Kitt Peak | Spacewatch | · | 2.5 km | MPC · JPL |
| 530867 | 2011 VX_{17} | — | August 13, 2007 | Socorro | LINEAR | · | 1.2 km | MPC · JPL |
| 530868 | 2011 VR_{21} | — | October 25, 2011 | Haleakala | Pan-STARRS 1 | V | 550 m | MPC · JPL |
| 530869 | 2011 VE_{22} | — | November 3, 2011 | Kitt Peak | Spacewatch | · | 2.5 km | MPC · JPL |
| 530870 | 2011 VT_{24} | — | November 3, 2011 | Kitt Peak | Spacewatch | · | 2.6 km | MPC · JPL |
| 530871 | 2011 WS_{2} | — | January 7, 2010 | WISE | WISE | APO +1km | 1.4 km | MPC · JPL |
| 530872 | 2011 WA_{3} | — | November 16, 2011 | Mount Lemmon | Mount Lemmon Survey | · | 660 m | MPC · JPL |
| 530873 | 2011 WO_{6} | — | October 18, 2011 | Kitt Peak | Spacewatch | · | 500 m | MPC · JPL |
| 530874 | 2011 WL_{8} | — | October 22, 2011 | Kitt Peak | Spacewatch | · | 790 m | MPC · JPL |
| 530875 | 2011 WJ_{11} | — | October 26, 2011 | Haleakala | Pan-STARRS 1 | · | 2.5 km | MPC · JPL |
| 530876 | 2011 WQ_{14} | — | October 26, 2011 | Haleakala | Pan-STARRS 1 | · | 990 m | MPC · JPL |
| 530877 | 2011 WN_{18} | — | December 29, 2008 | Mount Lemmon | Mount Lemmon Survey | · | 590 m | MPC · JPL |
| 530878 | 2011 WH_{20} | — | November 17, 2011 | Mount Lemmon | Mount Lemmon Survey | · | 730 m | MPC · JPL |
| 530879 | 2011 WL_{24} | — | November 17, 2011 | Mount Lemmon | Mount Lemmon Survey | · | 950 m | MPC · JPL |
| 530880 | 2011 WJ_{26} | — | October 24, 2011 | Kitt Peak | Spacewatch | V | 580 m | MPC · JPL |
| 530881 | 2011 WW_{28} | — | October 21, 2011 | Mount Lemmon | Mount Lemmon Survey | · | 730 m | MPC · JPL |
| 530882 | 2011 WH_{32} | — | May 22, 2003 | Kitt Peak | Spacewatch | · | 3.4 km | MPC · JPL |
| 530883 | 2011 WU_{36} | — | April 18, 2009 | Mount Lemmon | Mount Lemmon Survey | EOS | 1.6 km | MPC · JPL |
| 530884 | 2011 WX_{37} | — | October 1, 2011 | Mount Lemmon | Mount Lemmon Survey | · | 1.1 km | MPC · JPL |
| 530885 | 2011 WO_{38} | — | November 23, 2011 | Mount Lemmon | Mount Lemmon Survey | EOS | 2.5 km | MPC · JPL |
| 530886 | 2011 WW_{38} | — | October 26, 2011 | Haleakala | Pan-STARRS 1 | NYS | 780 m | MPC · JPL |
| 530887 | 2011 WX_{38} | — | October 27, 2011 | Kitt Peak | Spacewatch | · | 850 m | MPC · JPL |
| 530888 | 2011 WJ_{44} | — | November 1, 2011 | Kitt Peak | Spacewatch | V | 460 m | MPC · JPL |
| 530889 | 2011 WU_{44} | — | November 17, 2011 | Kitt Peak | Spacewatch | V | 430 m | MPC · JPL |
| 530890 | 2011 WW_{49} | — | November 16, 2011 | Kitt Peak | Spacewatch | · | 610 m | MPC · JPL |
| 530891 | 2011 WF_{50} | — | November 1, 2011 | Mount Lemmon | Mount Lemmon Survey | · | 2.2 km | MPC · JPL |
| 530892 | 2011 WX_{50} | — | November 23, 2011 | Socorro | LINEAR | PHO | 1.3 km | MPC · JPL |
| 530893 | 2011 WB_{51} | — | November 23, 2011 | Mount Lemmon | Mount Lemmon Survey | V | 510 m | MPC · JPL |
| 530894 | 2011 WS_{53} | — | November 24, 2011 | Kitt Peak | Spacewatch | V | 770 m | MPC · JPL |
| 530895 | 2011 WV_{57} | — | October 26, 2011 | Haleakala | Pan-STARRS 1 | · | 2.3 km | MPC · JPL |
| 530896 | 2011 WG_{61} | — | January 11, 2002 | Kitt Peak | Spacewatch | · | 520 m | MPC · JPL |
| 530897 | 2011 WN_{63} | — | September 10, 2007 | Kitt Peak | Spacewatch | MAS | 630 m | MPC · JPL |
| 530898 | 2011 WE_{64} | — | November 24, 2011 | Mount Lemmon | Mount Lemmon Survey | NYS | 660 m | MPC · JPL |
| 530899 | 2011 WK_{64} | — | November 1, 2011 | Mount Lemmon | Mount Lemmon Survey | · | 1.5 km | MPC · JPL |
| 530900 | 2011 WD_{72} | — | November 25, 2011 | Haleakala | Pan-STARRS 1 | · | 810 m | MPC · JPL |

== 530901–531000 ==
back to top

| Designation | | | Discovery | | | Properties | | Ref |
| Permanent | Provisional | Named after | Date | Site | Discoverer(s) | Category | Diam. | Ref |
|---|---|---|---|---|---|---|---|---|
| 530901 | 2011 WK_{73} | — | November 9, 1993 | Kitt Peak | Spacewatch | · | 780 m | MPC · JPL |
| 530902 | 2011 WQ_{73} | — | October 1, 2011 | Kitt Peak | Spacewatch | · | 920 m | MPC · JPL |
| 530903 | 2011 WY_{81} | — | October 26, 2011 | Haleakala | Pan-STARRS 1 | · | 2.7 km | MPC · JPL |
| 530904 | 2011 WE_{83} | — | October 25, 2011 | Haleakala | Pan-STARRS 1 | · | 2.4 km | MPC · JPL |
| 530905 | 2011 WP_{84} | — | November 24, 2011 | Haleakala | Pan-STARRS 1 | V | 540 m | MPC · JPL |
| 530906 | 2011 WD_{85} | — | November 24, 2011 | Haleakala | Pan-STARRS 1 | EOS | 1.6 km | MPC · JPL |
| 530907 | 2011 WK_{90} | — | November 1, 2011 | Mount Lemmon | Mount Lemmon Survey | · | 1.0 km | MPC · JPL |
| 530908 | 2011 WN_{90} | — | September 10, 2007 | Mount Lemmon | Mount Lemmon Survey | · | 740 m | MPC · JPL |
| 530909 | 2011 WO_{97} | — | October 21, 2011 | Mount Lemmon | Mount Lemmon Survey | · | 2.9 km | MPC · JPL |
| 530910 | 2011 WF_{107} | — | October 26, 2011 | Haleakala | Pan-STARRS 1 | · | 2.6 km | MPC · JPL |
| 530911 | 2011 WW_{107} | — | November 16, 2011 | Kitt Peak | Spacewatch | · | 710 m | MPC · JPL |
| 530912 | 2011 WC_{120} | — | October 26, 2011 | Haleakala | Pan-STARRS 1 | · | 780 m | MPC · JPL |
| 530913 | 2011 WO_{122} | — | October 24, 2011 | Haleakala | Pan-STARRS 1 | · | 530 m | MPC · JPL |
| 530914 | 2011 WB_{123} | — | October 21, 2011 | Mount Lemmon | Mount Lemmon Survey | V | 450 m | MPC · JPL |
| 530915 | 2011 WW_{123} | — | November 6, 2005 | Mount Lemmon | Mount Lemmon Survey | (895) | 3.0 km | MPC · JPL |
| 530916 | 2011 WL_{124} | — | November 27, 2006 | Mount Lemmon | Mount Lemmon Survey | · | 2.2 km | MPC · JPL |
| 530917 | 2011 WH_{127} | — | November 23, 2011 | Mount Lemmon | Mount Lemmon Survey | · | 3.2 km | MPC · JPL |
| 530918 | 2011 WP_{130} | — | January 20, 2009 | Mount Lemmon | Mount Lemmon Survey | · | 430 m | MPC · JPL |
| 530919 | 2011 WN_{131} | — | October 26, 2011 | Haleakala | Pan-STARRS 1 | · | 670 m | MPC · JPL |
| 530920 | 2011 WF_{134} | — | November 3, 2011 | Kitt Peak | Spacewatch | · | 2.5 km | MPC · JPL |
| 530921 | 2011 WZ_{135} | — | November 25, 2011 | Haleakala | Pan-STARRS 1 | · | 2.7 km | MPC · JPL |
| 530922 | 2011 WF_{143} | — | October 25, 2011 | Haleakala | Pan-STARRS 1 | · | 2.7 km | MPC · JPL |
| 530923 | 2011 WH_{144} | — | October 26, 2011 | Haleakala | Pan-STARRS 1 | EUP | 3.2 km | MPC · JPL |
| 530924 | 2011 WJ_{144} | — | August 24, 2007 | Kitt Peak | Spacewatch | · | 830 m | MPC · JPL |
| 530925 | 2011 WV_{144} | — | November 25, 2011 | Haleakala | Pan-STARRS 1 | MAS | 540 m | MPC · JPL |
| 530926 | 2011 WU_{149} | — | November 24, 2000 | Kitt Peak | Spacewatch | · | 3.3 km | MPC · JPL |
| 530927 | 2011 WL_{152} | — | January 25, 2009 | Kitt Peak | Spacewatch | · | 390 m | MPC · JPL |
| 530928 | 2011 WU_{153} | — | October 23, 2011 | Haleakala | Pan-STARRS 1 | THB | 3.1 km | MPC · JPL |
| 530929 | 2011 WA_{154} | — | October 26, 2011 | Haleakala | Pan-STARRS 1 | · | 2.2 km | MPC · JPL |
| 530930 | 2011 WG_{157} | — | November 20, 2011 | Haleakala | Pan-STARRS 1 | NT | 194 km | MPC · JPL |
| 530931 | 2011 WL_{158} | — | November 17, 2011 | Mount Lemmon | Mount Lemmon Survey | · | 2.0 km | MPC · JPL |
| 530932 | 2011 WR_{158} | — | November 25, 2011 | Haleakala | Pan-STARRS 1 | · | 2.8 km | MPC · JPL |
| 530933 | 2011 WA_{159} | — | November 24, 2011 | Mount Lemmon | Mount Lemmon Survey | · | 3.8 km | MPC · JPL |
| 530934 | 2011 WC_{159} | — | November 30, 2011 | Kitt Peak | Spacewatch | VER | 2.7 km | MPC · JPL |
| 530935 | 2011 WG_{159} | — | November 26, 2011 | Mount Lemmon | Mount Lemmon Survey | · | 3.2 km | MPC · JPL |
| 530936 | 2011 WH_{159} | — | July 4, 2010 | WISE | WISE | T_{j} (2.93) | 4.9 km | MPC · JPL |
| 530937 | 2011 WK_{159} | — | November 18, 2011 | Mount Lemmon | Mount Lemmon Survey | · | 950 m | MPC · JPL |
| 530938 | 2011 XE | — | January 16, 2010 | WISE | WISE | ATE | 410 m | MPC · JPL |
| 530939 | 2011 XQ | — | October 26, 2011 | Haleakala | Pan-STARRS 1 | ERI | 920 m | MPC · JPL |
| 530940 | 2011 XE_{1} | — | December 3, 2011 | ESA OGS | ESA OGS | AMO +1km | 820 m | MPC · JPL |
| 530941 | 2011 XJ_{4} | — | December 6, 2011 | Haleakala | Pan-STARRS 1 | cubewano (hot) | 196 km | MPC · JPL |
| 530942 | 2011 XP_{4} | — | December 15, 2011 | Haleakala | Pan-STARRS 1 | PHO | 990 m | MPC · JPL |
| 530943 | 2011 XQ_{4} | — | December 6, 2011 | Haleakala | Pan-STARRS 1 | · | 1.1 km | MPC · JPL |
| 530944 | 2011 YA_{1} | — | November 17, 2011 | Mount Lemmon | Mount Lemmon Survey | · | 760 m | MPC · JPL |
| 530945 | 2011 YQ_{12} | — | December 24, 2011 | Mount Lemmon | Mount Lemmon Survey | · | 590 m | MPC · JPL |
| 530946 | 2011 YZ_{21} | — | October 15, 2007 | Kitt Peak | Spacewatch | · | 910 m | MPC · JPL |
| 530947 | 2011 YW_{22} | — | October 30, 2007 | Mount Lemmon | Mount Lemmon Survey | NYS | 720 m | MPC · JPL |
| 530948 | 2011 YV_{23} | — | November 22, 2011 | Mount Lemmon | Mount Lemmon Survey | · | 730 m | MPC · JPL |
| 530949 | 2011 YX_{33} | — | December 26, 2011 | Kitt Peak | Spacewatch | · | 550 m | MPC · JPL |
| 530950 | 2011 YE_{35} | — | February 9, 2005 | Anderson Mesa | LONEOS | · | 810 m | MPC · JPL |
| 530951 | 2011 YB_{38} | — | December 26, 2011 | Kitt Peak | Spacewatch | · | 570 m | MPC · JPL |
| 530952 | 2011 YC_{60} | — | December 29, 2011 | Kitt Peak | Spacewatch | · | 650 m | MPC · JPL |
| 530953 | 2011 YY_{66} | — | December 31, 2011 | Kitt Peak | Spacewatch | NYS | 850 m | MPC · JPL |
| 530954 | 2011 YT_{78} | — | November 27, 2011 | Mount Lemmon | Mount Lemmon Survey | HNS | 1.1 km | MPC · JPL |
| 530955 | 2011 YN_{79} | — | December 16, 2011 | Haleakala | Pan-STARRS 1 | SDO | 231 km | MPC · JPL |
| 530956 | 2011 YU_{79} | — | December 29, 2011 | Kitt Peak | Spacewatch | · | 1.1 km | MPC · JPL |
| 530957 | 2011 YA_{80} | — | December 27, 2011 | Mount Lemmon | Mount Lemmon Survey | MAS | 530 m | MPC · JPL |
| 530958 | 2011 YT_{80} | — | December 27, 2011 | Mount Lemmon | Mount Lemmon Survey | · | 620 m | MPC · JPL |
| 530959 | 2011 YZ_{80} | — | December 31, 2011 | Mount Lemmon | Mount Lemmon Survey | EOS | 1.5 km | MPC · JPL |
| 530960 | 2011 YD_{81} | — | November 30, 2011 | Mount Lemmon | Mount Lemmon Survey | · | 1.0 km | MPC · JPL |
| 530961 | 2012 AB_{4} | — | January 1, 2012 | Mount Lemmon | Mount Lemmon Survey | · | 480 m | MPC · JPL |
| 530962 | 2012 AG_{8} | — | January 2, 2012 | Kitt Peak | Spacewatch | · | 720 m | MPC · JPL |
| 530963 | 2012 AM_{8} | — | January 2, 2012 | Kitt Peak | Spacewatch | · | 760 m | MPC · JPL |
| 530964 | 2012 AQ_{12} | — | January 6, 2012 | Kitt Peak | Spacewatch | · | 440 m | MPC · JPL |
| 530965 | 2012 AA_{24} | — | December 24, 2011 | Mount Lemmon | Mount Lemmon Survey | NYS | 770 m | MPC · JPL |
| 530966 | 2012 AS_{24} | — | January 1, 2008 | Mount Lemmon | Mount Lemmon Survey | V | 730 m | MPC · JPL |
| 530967 | 2012 AU_{24} | — | December 2, 2010 | Kitt Peak | Spacewatch | · | 1.3 km | MPC · JPL |
| 530968 | 2012 AZ_{24} | — | November 19, 2003 | Kitt Peak | Spacewatch | · | 1.1 km | MPC · JPL |
| 530969 | 2012 AR_{25} | — | January 2, 2012 | Mount Lemmon | Mount Lemmon Survey | PHO | 950 m | MPC · JPL |
| 530970 | 2012 AX_{25} | — | January 4, 2012 | Mount Lemmon | Mount Lemmon Survey | · | 970 m | MPC · JPL |
| 530971 | 2012 AY_{25} | — | January 4, 2012 | Mount Lemmon | Mount Lemmon Survey | · | 650 m | MPC · JPL |
| 530972 | 2012 BK_{2} | — | December 27, 2011 | Mount Lemmon | Mount Lemmon Survey | · | 790 m | MPC · JPL |
| 530973 | 2012 BY_{4} | — | January 18, 2012 | Kitt Peak | Spacewatch | NYS | 720 m | MPC · JPL |
| 530974 | 2012 BN_{11} | — | January 19, 2012 | Kitt Peak | Spacewatch | APO · PHA | 250 m | MPC · JPL |
| 530975 | 2012 BM_{16} | — | January 21, 2012 | Catalina | CSS | NYS | 1.2 km | MPC · JPL |
| 530976 | 2012 BM_{18} | — | January 19, 2012 | Haleakala | Pan-STARRS 1 | · | 1.5 km | MPC · JPL |
| 530977 | 2012 BD_{19} | — | January 19, 2012 | Haleakala | Pan-STARRS 1 | · | 1.5 km | MPC · JPL |
| 530978 | 2012 BV_{21} | — | December 27, 2011 | Mount Lemmon | Mount Lemmon Survey | (194) | 1.4 km | MPC · JPL |
| 530979 | 2012 BZ_{21} | — | January 4, 2012 | Mount Lemmon | Mount Lemmon Survey | · | 2.1 km | MPC · JPL |
| 530980 | 2012 BW_{23} | — | August 21, 2007 | Anderson Mesa | LONEOS | · | 1.6 km | MPC · JPL |
| 530981 | 2012 BM_{36} | — | October 15, 2007 | Mount Lemmon | Mount Lemmon Survey | · | 570 m | MPC · JPL |
| 530982 | 2012 BD_{37} | — | January 19, 2012 | Mount Lemmon | Mount Lemmon Survey | · | 670 m | MPC · JPL |
| 530983 | 2012 BT_{51} | — | January 21, 2012 | Kitt Peak | Spacewatch | NYS | 860 m | MPC · JPL |
| 530984 | 2012 BO_{56} | — | February 2, 2005 | Kitt Peak | Spacewatch | · | 700 m | MPC · JPL |
| 530985 | 2012 BD_{58} | — | October 7, 2007 | Mount Lemmon | Mount Lemmon Survey | MAS | 520 m | MPC · JPL |
| 530986 | 2012 BX_{58} | — | November 30, 2011 | Mount Lemmon | Mount Lemmon Survey | · | 1.2 km | MPC · JPL |
| 530987 | 2012 BZ_{65} | — | January 20, 2012 | Mount Lemmon | Mount Lemmon Survey | PHO | 810 m | MPC · JPL |
| 530988 | 2012 BD_{82} | — | January 27, 2012 | Mount Lemmon | Mount Lemmon Survey | · | 820 m | MPC · JPL |
| 530989 | 2012 BM_{84} | — | January 27, 2012 | Mount Lemmon | Mount Lemmon Survey | · | 680 m | MPC · JPL |
| 530990 | 2012 BW_{85} | — | January 27, 2012 | Catalina | CSS | · | 1.0 km | MPC · JPL |
| 530991 | 2012 BD_{86} | — | January 27, 2012 | Mount Lemmon | Mount Lemmon Survey | · | 350 m | MPC · JPL |
| 530992 | 2012 BB_{92} | — | January 19, 2012 | Kitt Peak | Spacewatch | · | 870 m | MPC · JPL |
| 530993 | 2012 BY_{93} | — | January 19, 2012 | Kitt Peak | Spacewatch | · | 490 m | MPC · JPL |
| 530994 | 2012 BA_{100} | — | January 27, 2012 | Kitt Peak | Spacewatch | · | 640 m | MPC · JPL |
| 530995 | 2012 BT_{110} | — | January 27, 2012 | Kitt Peak | Spacewatch | · | 1 km | MPC · JPL |
| 530996 | 2012 BF_{111} | — | January 27, 2012 | Mount Lemmon | Mount Lemmon Survey | · | 740 m | MPC · JPL |
| 530997 | 2012 BX_{111} | — | January 19, 2012 | Haleakala | Pan-STARRS 1 | MAR | 1.0 km | MPC · JPL |
| 530998 | 2012 BM_{112} | — | January 19, 2012 | Kitt Peak | Spacewatch | · | 600 m | MPC · JPL |
| 530999 | 2012 BZ_{114} | — | January 27, 2012 | Mount Lemmon | Mount Lemmon Survey | · | 610 m | MPC · JPL |
| 531000 | 2012 BG_{117} | — | May 4, 2002 | Kitt Peak | Spacewatch | · | 540 m | MPC · JPL |

back to top

== Meaning of names ==
As minor planet discoveries are confirmed, they are given a permanent number by the IAU's Minor Planet Center (MPC), and the discoverers can then submit names for them, following the IAU's naming conventions. The list below concerns those minor planets in the specified number-range that have received names, and explains the meanings of those names.

Official naming citations of newly named small Solar System bodies are approved and published in a bulletin by IAU's Working Group for Small Bodies Nomenclature (WGSBN). Before May 2021, citations were published in MPC's Minor Planet Circulars for many decades. Recent citations can also be found on the JPL Small-Body Database (SBDB). Until his death in 2016, German astronomer Lutz D. Schmadel compiled these citations into the Dictionary of Minor Planet Names (DMP) and regularly updated the collection.

Based on Paul Herget's The Names of the Minor Planets, Schmadel also researched the unclear origin of numerous asteroids, most of which had been named prior to World War II. This article incorporates text from this source, which is in the public domain: SBDB New namings may only be added to this list below after official publication as the preannouncement of names is condemned. The WGSBN publishes a comprehensive guideline for the naming rules of non-cometary small Solar System bodies.

| Named minor planet | Provisional | This minor planet was named for... | Ref · Catalog |
|---|---|---|---|
| 530721 Isscas | 2011 UH_{88} | ISSCAS, the 1953-founded Institute of Soil Science of the Chinese Academy of Sciences is the only national institute fully dedicated to research on soil, promoting a sustainable development of agriculture in an ecological environment. | IAU · 530721 |
| 530739 Nanligong | 2011 UL_{124} | Nanligong (Nanjing University of Science & Technology). | IAU · 530739 |
| 530768 Nanpu | 2011 UD_{194} | Nanpu is a combination of "Nan" from Zhongshan Nan Road, and "Pu" from Puyun Road, the intersection where the Nanjing No. 1 Middle School is located. | IAU · 530768 |
