= School of Astronautics, HIT =

School of Harbin Institute of Technology

School of Astronautics, Harbin Institute of Technology
- Type: Engineering school
- Parent institution: Harbin Institute of Technology
- Dean: Cao Xibin(曹喜滨)
- Faculty: 302
- Doctoral students: Totals: MD - 400; PhD - 200
- Location: Harbin, Heilongjiang, China
- Website: sa.hit.edu.cn

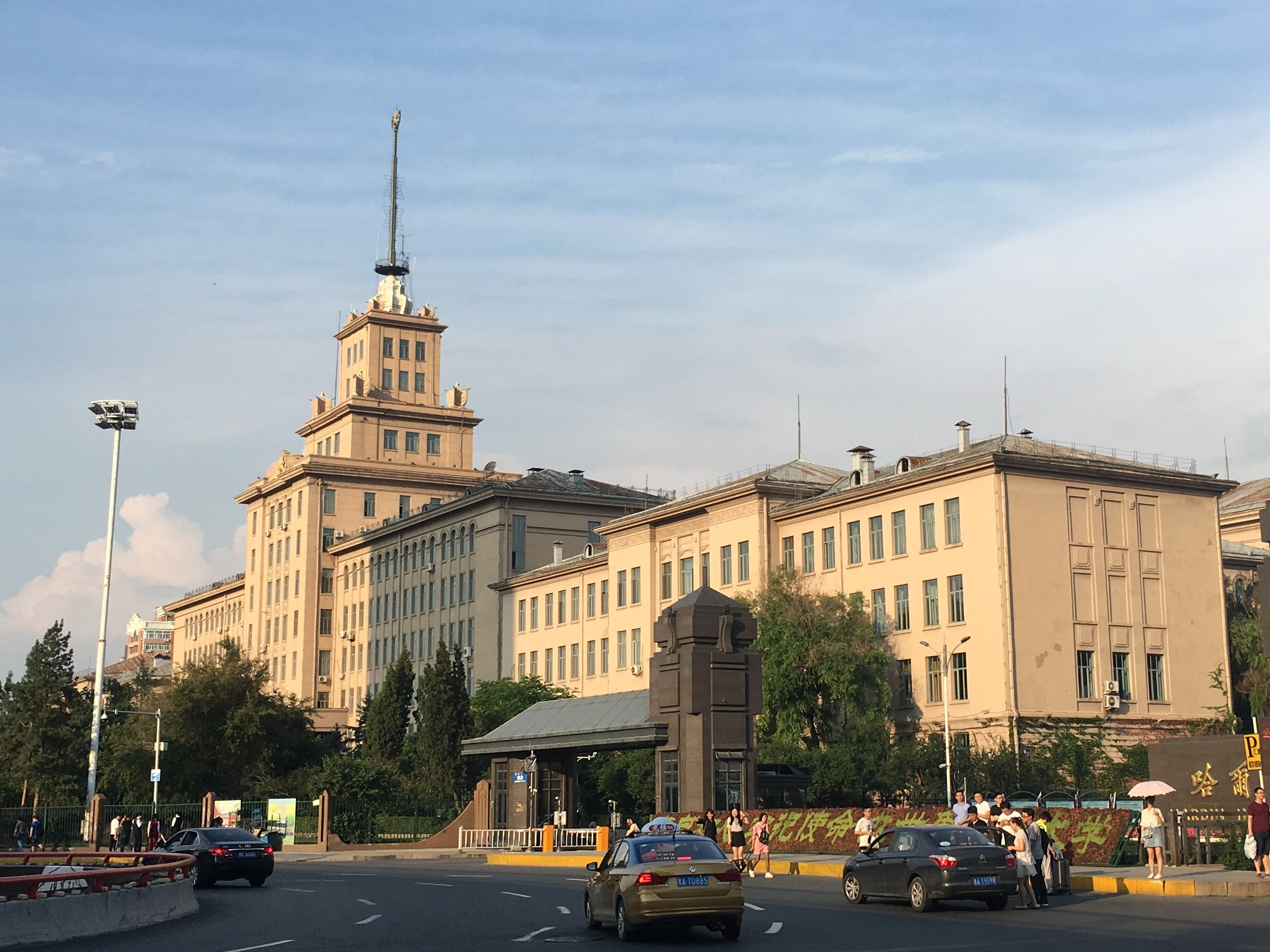
Main Building

School of Astronautics, HIT is the Engineering school of Harbin Institute of Technology. The school is the first-ever school to initiate college education in astronautics discipline in China.

In 2026, the school employed 593 faculty members, including assistant, associate, and full professors.

== Faculty ==
Staff members and professors have included:

- 6 academicians of Chinese Academy of Engineering / Sciences
- 9 Changjiang Scholar professors
- 3 Changjiang Visiting professors
- 5 winners of the National Outstanding Youth Foundation
- 1 state-level teaching group
- 1 innovation group of the Chinese National Natural Science Foundation
- 3 innovation groups of the Ministry of Education
- 3 innovation groups of national defense science and technology
- 21 persons selected in the supporting program sponsored by National Education Committee & National Education Department

== Postgraduate ==
The school enrolls and educates about 400 Master students and 200 PhD candidates every year.

=== IEEE HIT Student Branch ===
IEEE HIT student branch was established in 2008. The branch has held more than 10 professional and technical meetings and seminars, and has given assistance to several visiting IEEE leaders and professors. Furthermore, it has organized activities for visiting industry-related companies, in which more than 1000 students participated. In 2016, the National Conference on Microwave and National Conference on Electromagnetic Compatibility will be held in Harbin.

== Cooperation with other universities ==
The school has established a close relationship with several research institutes of China Aerospace Science and Technology Corporation and China Aerospace Science and Industry Corporation. The school has set up internship bases in these institutes for students, and invited several specialists as part-time professors, including Sun Jiadong, Chief designer of Chinese Lunar Orbiting Detection Project and Wang Yongzhi, Chief designer of Chinese Manned Space Project.

The school has maintained close collaboration with Chinese General Armament Department and the Chinese Rocket Force.

Seminar in Astronautics are frequently held in collaboration with other research institutes .

=== International exchange ===
The school actively undertakes international exchange through communication and cooperation with related departments in more than 20 universities worldwide. The school has also invited 5 long-term overseas visiting specialists, and 17 overseas honorary specialists to share knowledge with students. In the past 3 years, the school has held about 10 international academic conferences, and has invited nearly 100 foreign specialists to give lectures.

=== Domestic collaboration ===
The Deep Space Detection Research Center has held COSPAR Capacity Building Workshop 2009-Lunar and Planetary Surface Science. The Space Control and Inertial Technology Research Center has held the 1 st International Symposium on System and Control of Aeronautics and Astronautics (ISSCAA2007). The 2007 Conference on Smart Material and Nano Technology was held in HIT, which was hosted by the Center for Composite Materials and Structures and co-sponsored by International Society For Optical Engineering(SPIE), and USA National Science Foundation(NSF). Academician Du Shanyi, the only Chinese member of International Composite Material Committee Professor He Xiaodong was invited to deliver a plenary presentation in SAMPE Asia

=== Cooperation with Russia and Ukraine ===
School of Astronautics, HIT has a long history of collaboration with Russia and Ukraine. The school has kept a close relationship with Moscow University and Bauman Moscow State Technical University. Nowadays, graduates from the Teachers' Training Class for Spacecraft held by Samara State Aerospace University have become leaders in various Chinese spacecraft programs.

Teaching experiment equipments, such as the returning capsule introduced from Russia, are playing significant roles in human spaceflight education of the school.

== Outstanding Alumni ==
=== Notable graduates ===
A number of graduates from the school have become leaders in the Chinese aerospace industry as well as other fields.

- Song Jian: missile scientist, the main architect and proponent of China's one-child policy
- Li Jinai: the director of PLA General Political Department
- Ma Xingrui: aerospace engineer, the current Governor of Guangdong
- Yang Baohua: director of Chinese Academy of Space Technology

=== Notable professors ===
- Ma Zuguang: paragon for Chinese intellectuals today, academician of Chinese Academy of Engineering, well-known specialist in optics
- Huang Wenhu: academician of Chinese Academy of Engineering, in the field of mechanics and aircraft failure diagnosis
- Wang Zicai: academician of Chinese Academy of Engineering, in the field of system control and simulation
