= May 1903 =

Month in 1903

| << | May 1903 | | | | | >> |
| Su | Mo | Tu | We | Th | Fr | Sa |
| | | | | | 1 | 2 |
| 3 | 4 | 5 | 6 | 7 | 8 | 9 |
| 10 | 11 | 12 | 13 | 14 | 15 | 16 |
| 17 | 18 | 19 | 20 | 21 | 22 | 23 |
| 24 | 25 | 26 | 27 | 28 | 29 | 30 |
| 31 |

The following events occurred in May 1903:

== May 1, 1903 (Friday) ==
- Turkish troops captured a band of 300 Macedonian Bulgarian invaders at Nevrokop (now Gotse Delchev in Bulgaria).
- A law went into effect in the U.S. state of South Carolina prohibiting the employment of any child to work in the state's cotton mills until that child was at least 10 years old.
- King Edward VII of Britain was received by President Emile Loubet of France.

== May 2, 1903 (Saturday) ==
- Judge Himes won the 29th Kentucky Derby horse race.
- Born: Bing Crosby, U.S. singer and actor; in Tacoma, Washington, under the name Harry Lillis Crosby Jr. (died 1977)

== May 3, 1903 (Sunday) ==
- The power system for the Mersey Railway, operating between Birkenhead and Liverpool by tunnel under the River Mersey, UK, was converted from steam to electricity.

== May 4, 1903 (Monday) ==
- The Macedonian Bulgarian revolutionary leader Gotse Delchev was killed in a skirmish with the Turkish army.

== May 5, 1903 (Tuesday) ==
- The sinking of the U.S. steamer Saginaw killed 15 people— eight passengers and seven crew— when it collided with another American ship, the Hamilton, in a dense fog off of Hog Island, Virginia.
- Born: James Beard, American chef, cookbook author, teacher and television personality, in Portland, Oregon (died 1985)

== May 6, 1903 (Wednesday) ==
- Britain's House of Commons voted in favor of guaranteeing the funds for a $175 million loan to protect Britain's colonies in South Africa at the Transvaal.
- The Ottoman government accused the Bulgarian government of complicity in supporting the invasion of Ottoman Macedonia.
- Britain's Foreign Secretary, Lord Lansdowne (Henry Petty-Fitzmaurice) declared in Commons that Britain would resist any attempt by a foreign power to establish a naval base or fortress in the Persian Gulf.
- The U.S. fishing schooner Gloriana sank, killing 15 of the 18 crew aboard, off of Newfoundland.

== May 7, 1903 (Thursday) ==
- The Irish Land Bill passed its second reading in Commons, 443 to 26.

== May 8, 1903 (Friday) ==
- Russian troops resumed their occupation of the Chinese port of Newchang (now Yingkou) in the Liaoning province.
- Born: Fernandel, French actor, in Marseilles, as Fernand Joseph Désiré Contandin (died 1971)
- Died: Paul Gauguin, 54, French Post-Impressionist artist (probable heart attack)

== May 9, 1903 (Saturday) ==
- The New York City Police Department discovered a bomb on board the British liner RMS Umbria, which was scheduled to sail from New York to Liverpool at noon, after having been alerted by an anonymous letter sent to NYPD headquarters. According to the letter, the New York Mafia had originally planned to put the bomb on the White Star liner RMS Oceanic but changed their plans because of the number of women and children booked for that liner. The crate contained 100 pounds (45 kg) of dynamite attached to a crude timed fuse. Police would trace the bomb back to a Chicago lodging house.

== May 10, 1903 (Sunday) ==
- The first article identifying what would later be known as Crohn's disease, by Polish surgeon Antoni Leśniowski, was published in the weekly medical newspaper Medycyna.

== May 11, 1903 (Monday) ==
- The Ottoman government disavowed responsibility for the massacre of residents of Monastir, now Bitola region of what is now North Macedonia.

== May 12, 1903 (Tuesday) ==
- The U.S. state of California forcibly removed several hundred Cupeño (Kuupangaxwichem) Native American Indian tribe from their homeland in the area around Warner Springs in San Diego County, California, with Bureau of Indian Affairs agents and 44 armed teamsters
- The University of Puerto Rico began operation.
- A fire destroyed half the town of Biecz in Poland, leaving 600 people homeless.

== May 13, 1903 (Wednesday) ==
- In the United States, the Fremont, Elkhorn and Missouri Valley Railroad (later part of Chicago and North Western Railway) began a passenger service to Casper, Wyoming.
- An 7.0 magnitude earthquake struck the Pacific archipelago of the New Hebrides, now Vanuatu.
- The towns of New Hampshire held town councils of their residents across the U.S. state to vote on the question for licensing the sale of liquor by taverns, with all voting in favor of a licensing requirement, and large majority voting to not grant licenses once the requirement became law.
- The Republican Executive Committee for the predominantly-Democrat U.S. state of Alabama voted to admit African-Americans for participation in Republican Party councils.
- The U.S. state of Pennsylvania enacted the "press muzzler" bill as Governor Pennypacker signed into law a bill to restrict the operation of the news media.
- Died: Apolinario Mabini, 38, Filipino politician and the country's first prime minister (cholera)

== May 14, 1903 (Thursday) ==
- U.S. President Roosevelt announced the appointment of three American arbitrators for foreign claims against Venezuela as part of the Washington protocols, with Frank C. Partridge handling British and Dutch claims, General Henry M. Duffield for German claims, and Jackson H. Ralston for Italian claims.

== May 15, 1903 (Friday) ==
- The social service organisation, Sree Narayana Dharma Paripalana Yogam (SNDP), was established in Kerala, India, by Padmanabhan Palpu and others.
- Died: Victoriano Lorenzo, 35/36, Panamanian revolutionary freedom fighter, executed.

== May 16, 1903 (Saturday) ==
- The first Coney Island Luna Park opened in Brooklyn, New York City.

== May 17, 1903 (Sunday) ==
- Manuel Bonilla formally took office as President of Honduras, with future president Miguel R. Dávila as his vice-president.
- Born: Cool Papa Bell (James Thomas Bell), African-American baseball player who set the record for most games played (1,202) in the Negro Major Leagues, and inductee to the National Baseball Hall of Fame in 1974; in Starkville, Mississippi (d. 1991)

== May 18, 1903 (Monday) ==
- General Racho Petrov formed a new cabinet in Bulgaria as prime minister to replace the government of Stoyan Danev.
- The Chinese Empire declined proposals by the U.S. and Japan to open Manchurian towns to foreign trade.
- The deep water port at Burgas opened in Bulgaria.

== May 19, 1903 (Tuesday) ==
- Scottish-born American engineer and entrepreneur David Dunbar Buick incorporated the Buick Motor Company in the U.S. state of Michigan with the assistance of Benjamin Briscoe.
- The Coast Squadron was formed as a unit of the United States Navy for defense of the Atlantic coastline of the U.S., and was based at Key West in Florida with USS Texas as its flagship.

== May 20, 1903 (Wednesday) ==
- The British House of Commons passed a resolution in favor of allowing the British government to negotiate with the other European nations to resolve the matter of the slave rule by Belgium's King Leopold II of the Congo Free State.
- Born: Miklós László (pen name for Nicholaus Leitner), Hungarian-born American playwright and screenwriter known for his romantic comedy play Parfumerie (1937), adapted to the musical She Loves Me (1937) and the films The Shop Around the Corner (1940), In the Good Old Summertime (1949) and You've Got Mail (1998); in Budapest, Kingdom of Hungary, Austro-Hungarian Empire (d.1973)

== May 21, 1903 (Thursday) ==
- The Lewis and Clark Memorial Column was dedicated in Portland, Oregon by U.S. President Roosevelt.
- Born:
  - General Pedro Eugenio Aramburu, President of Argentina from 1955 to 1958; in Río Cuarto, Córdoba (kidnapped and murdered, 1970)
  - Chen Guangxi, Chinese computer engineer who developed the first analog computer in the People's Republic of China; in Tongcheng, Anhui province, Republic of China (d.1992)
  - Jill Scott, the first woman racing driver in Britain; in Darton, Yorkshire (d.1974)

== May 22, 1903 (Friday) ==
- A Cuban–American Treaty of Relations was signed.
- Died: Misao Fujimura, 16, Japanese philosophy student, remembered chiefly for his farewell poem (suicide)

== May 23, 1903 (Saturday) ==
- Franz Joseph I, Emperor of Austria-Hungary, in his capacity as King Ferenc Jozsef of Hungary, authorized Károly Khuen-Héderváry to form a new government to replace Kálmán Széll as Prime Minister of Hungary.
- Born: William Prager, German-born American mathematician known for the Drucker–Prager yield criterion and the Prager consistency condition in flow plasticity theory; in Karlsruhe (d.1980).

== May 24, 1903 (Sunday) ==
- The Paris–Madrid race for automobiles started from the gardens of Versailles. The race became notable for the number of accidents, including at least eight rumored fatalities. It was cancelled when the competitors reached Bordeaux.

== May 25, 1903 (Monday) ==
- New Zealand's Ward Observatory was opened, in Whanganui by astronomer Joseph Ward.
- The Lackawanna and Wyoming Valley Railroad, the first railroad in the United States to use an electrified third rail, was opened.
- Born:
  - Austin J. Tobin, American businessman who served as the Director of the Port of New York Authority from 1942 to 1972, known for authorizing the construction of the original World Trade Center.(d. 1978)
  - Abdul Haque Faridi, Bangladeshi educator and president of the Bangla Academy; in Paikapara, Bengal Presidency, British India (now Shariatpur District in Bangladesh)(p. 1996)

== May 26, 1903 (Tuesday) ==
- On departure from Antwerp, carrying emigrants to Canada, the British passenger-cargo ship Huddersfield collided with the Norwegian steamer SS Uto in the River Scheldt. All 22 passengers were drowned as the 17 crew of the Huddersfield safely evacuated to the Uto.
- The Australian passenger-cargo ship SS Oakland foundered in stormy weather in the Tasman Sea near Cabbage Tree Island off New South Wales, with 11 of the 18 people on board drowning. The remaining seven were picked up by the steamer SS Bellinger.
- Românul de la Pind, the longest-running newspaper by and about Aromanians until World War II, was founded.
- Died: Marcel Renault, 31, French racing driver and industrialist, of injuries incurred by crashing into a tree while competing in the Paris-Madrid race.

== May 27, 1903 (Wednesday) ==
- The German company Telefunken was founded in Berlin as a joint venture of the electrical engineering company Siemens & Halske (now part of Siemens) and the electrical engineering company AEG ( Allgemeine Elektrizitäts-Gesellschaft) for the purpose of developing a wireless communication using patents already granted and research into better equipment as precursor to radio broadcasting and receiving.
- In the U.S., Western Michigan University was established Western Michigan Normal School in Kalamazoo, Michigan. Initially a college for training of teachers, it was one of the eight research universities in the state more than 120 years later.
- The Bates Automobile Company was founded at Lansing, Michigan by M. F. Bates, a former draftsman for the P.F. Olds & Son company.
- Born: Ernesto Rossi, American gangster; in Manhattan, New York City (killed, 1931)
- Died: Thomas Crane, 59, British book illustrator

== May 28, 1903 (Thursday) ==
- USS Wisconsin became the first battleship to enter the U.S. Navy's Pearl Harbor base, after three years of dredging the harbor and enlarging the channel to accommodate larger ships. After sailing into the harbor, USS Wisconsin entered refueled at the new coaling station and replenished its supply of fresh water.

== May 29, 1903 (Friday) ==
- The Connecticut State Police, one of the first statewide police agencies in the United States, was founded with five officers, paid three dollars per day, to enforce the state's liquor and vice laws.
- Born:
  - Bob Hope, English-born U.S. comedian and actor; as Leslie Townes Hope in Eltham, Kent (died 2003)
  - Hollis Dow Hedberg, American geologist and specialist in petroleum deposit locations; in Falun, Kansas (d.1988)
  - Zelma O'Neal, American stage and film actress; in Rock Falls, Illinois (d.1989)

== May 30, 1903 (Saturday) ==
- The Sherman Monument, a bronze set of statutes by Irish-born American sculptor Augustus Saint-Gaudens to honor American Civil War General William Tecumseh Sherman, was unveiled at New York City's Grand Army Plaza on Decoration Day, now the Memorial Day federal holiday. The three statues are General Shermn, riding upon his horse ("Ontario"), and following Nike, the goddess of victory.
- Born: Billy Baldwin, American interior decorator nicknamed "the dean of interior decorators"; in Roland Park, Maryland (d.1983)

== May 31, 1903 (Sunday) ==
- Charles Jonnart, France's Governor-General of Algeria, was shot at while he was making an inspection tour of Algeria's border with Morocco, near the Moroccan city of Figuig. The assassination attempt would be followed by France's conquest of Morocco. Eight days after the incident, French artillery began the bombardment of Figuig on June 9, 1903, and the conflict escalated.
- VfB Leipzig defeated DFC Prag, 7 to 2, to win the first German championship of soccer football and was awarded the Viktoria trophy. The competition was among six teams that had been the champions of their regional leagues and took place near Hamburg at the Exerzierweide parade ground at Altona.
- The Swedish Sports Confederation (Riksidrottsförbundet) was founded in Stockholm at the Royal Central Gymnastics Institute by representatives of 35 sport clubs.
