= List of shipwrecks in 1903 =

The list of shipwrecks in 1903 includes ships sunk, foundered, grounded, or otherwise lost during 1903.

table of contents
1903
Jan	Feb	Mar	Apr
May	Jun	Jul	Aug
Sep	Oct	Nov	Dec
Unknown date

== January ==
=== 2 January ===
List of shipwrecks: 2 January 1903
Ship	State	Description
Prince Arthur	Norway	The barque was wrecked in a storm on a reef 10 miles (16 km) south of Cape Alava and broke up. 18 were killed, 2 survivors.

=== 3 January ===
List of shipwrecks: 3 January 1903
Ship	State	Description
Remedios Pascual	Spain	During a voyage from Buenos Aires, Argentina, to New York City carrying a crew of 21 men and a cargo of animal bones destined for a fertilizer factory, the 1,605-ton schooner was wrecked in thick fog during a gale about 200 yards (183 m) off Ship Bottom, New Jersey, and about 1.5 miles (2.4 km) north of the Ship Bottom Life-Saving Station. The United States Life-Saving Service rescued her entire crew. Her wreck sank in 20 to 30 feet (6 to 9 m) of water and is known as the "Bone Wreck" and the "Surf City Wreck."

=== 7 January ===
List of shipwrecks: 7 January 1903
Ship	State	Description
Jas. A. Carney	United States	The steamer struck an obstruction at the mouth of the Mobile River in Alabama and was beached. She was refloated and repaired.

=== 8 January ===
List of shipwrecks: 8 January 1903
Ship	State	Description
Lucille Nowland	United States	The steamer struck a hidden obstruction in the Arkansas River between Memphis, Tennessee and Pine Bluff, Arkansas and sank.

=== 9 January ===
List of shipwrecks: 9 January 1903
Ship	State	Description
Alligator	United States	The steamer sank at dock at Palatka, Florida due to a broken pipe. Raised, repaired and returned to service.
Crosby	United Kingdom	The steamship was wrecked at Bempton Cliffs, Flamborough Head, Yorkshire, United Kingdom.
Otto	United States	The laid up steamer burned at Freeport, Florida.
Palmas	United Kingdom	The cargo ship was sighted whilst on a voyage from Liverpool, Lancashire to Boston, Massachusetts, United States. No further trace, presumed foundered in the Atlantic Ocean with the loss of all 39 crew.

=== 13 January ===
List of shipwrecks: 13 January 1903
Ship	State	Description
Thomas Morgan	United States	The tug ran aground at high tide on a steep bank in the harbor at Charleston, South Carolina. When the tide dropped she slid off and sank. One crewman killed.

=== 16 January ===
List of shipwrecks: 16 January 1903
Ship	State	Description
Grit	United States	The tow steamer sank at dock in Tottenville, New York due to a damaged plank.

=== 17 January ===
List of shipwrecks: 17 January 1903
Ship	State	Description
Earl	United States	The steamer capsized and sank at the mouth of the Tangipahoa River, possibly from being close to the bank edge with the river level dropping.

=== 19 January ===
List of shipwrecks: 19 January 1903
Ship	State	Description
Nimble	United Kingdom	The 23-ton ketch was wrecked on Angus Rock, Strangford Lough, County Down, Ireland, UK (54°29′N 05°37′W).

=== 21 January ===
List of shipwrecks: 21 January 1903
Ship	State	Description
USS Leyden	United States Navy	While on a return passage from Puerto Rico in heavy fog, the tug was wrecked on rocks just off Southeast Point on Block Island off the coast of Rhode Island, 0.75 nautical miles (1.39 km; 0.86 mi) west of Block Island Southeast Light. Her wreck settled in 15 feet (4.6 m) of water at 41°08.85′N 071°33.86′W.
Nanticoke	United States	The steamer was sunk by ice in Newark Bay. Later raised and drydocked.
Seaboard	United States	The steamer ran aground in high winds, heavy seas, and dense fog on Dutch Island in Narragansett Bay. Later refloated.

=== 22 January ===
List of shipwrecks: 22 January 1903
Ship	State	Description
Fawn	United States	The laid up steamer sank at St. Louis, Missouri when cold weather opened up her seams. She was a total loss.

=== 23 January ===
List of shipwrecks: 23 January 1903
Ship	State	Description
John T. Pratt	United States	The tow steamer sank at dock at the foot of Van Brunt Street, Brooklyn when her seams opened up. Later raised and repaired.

=== 25 January ===
List of shipwrecks: 25 January 1903
Ship	State	Description
Otto	Sweden	The steamer was wrecked off Terschelling.

=== 29 January ===
List of shipwrecks: 29 January 1903
Ship	State	Description
Bay Ridge	United States	The tow steamer sank at dock in thick fog at The Battery when she was struck by New York Central No. 6 (United States).

=== 30 January ===
List of shipwrecks: 30 January 1903
Ship	State	Description
Crescent City	United States	The steamer was wrecked on Fish Rocks near Point Arena, California, a total loss.
Gulf Stream	United States	The steamer was wrecked on the bar at Hereford, New Jersey in heavy seas and dense fog. Her cargo was salvaged.

== February ==
=== 1 February ===
List of shipwrecks: 1 February 1903
Ship	State	Description
James Stevens No. 12	Royal National Lifeboat Institution	The Mumbles lifeboat capsized at the mouth of the River Afan with the loss of six of her fourteen crew.
Maskelyne	Belgium	The steamship foundered at 41°35′N 34°40′W.

=== 2 February ===
List of shipwrecks: 2 February 1903
Ship	State	Description
Alert	Norway	The steamer sprung a leak in a gale and foundered 100 miles (160 km) off Spurn Point. All nine crew were rescued by the trawler Cepheus (United Kingdom).

=== 4 February ===
List of shipwrecks: 4 February 1903
Ship	State	Description
Berwick		The Newcastle steamer was wrecked on the Runnelstone. Her crew took to two lifeboats, one of which reached land and the other, with five crew members on board, was taken to Penzance in the Sennen Cove Lifeboat Station lifeboat Ann Newbon ( Royal National Lifeboat Institution).
Espingole	French Navy	The Durandal-class destroyer hit a rock and sank in Cavalaire Bay off Cavalaire-sur-Mer, France. Her wreck was sold as scrap in December 1909.
Marina (or Mariana)	United States	During a voyage from Killisnoo to Hoonah, District of Alaska, with her owner, five passengers, and a cargo of camp supplies and potatoes on board, the 5-ton, 30-foot (9.1 m) sloop was wrecked on a reef in Chatham Strait in the Alexander Archipelago in Southeast Alaska, probably at Fishery Point (57°47′30″N 134°42′35″W). All on board survived the initial wreck and all of her cargo was brought ashore, but her owner and two other men who went back aboard her to await the rising tide to refloat her perished, two of them disappearing completely.
New York Central No. 22	United States	The tow steamer ran aground in thick fog at Sunken Meadows, New York in the East River. Refloated on 7 February.

=== 5 February ===
List of shipwrecks: 5 February 1903
Ship	State	Description
Red Cloud	United States	The steamer was sunk by ice in the Pend d'Oreille River below Newport, Oregon.

=== 6 February ===
List of shipwrecks: 6 February 1903
Ship	State	Description
Gladys	United States	The steamer listed on a rising tide and sank at Pier 83 North, Philadelphia, Pennsylvania. Raised the next day.

=== 7 February ===
List of shipwrecks: 7 February 1903
Ship	State	Description
Isabel	United States	The steamer was destroyed by fire at Stokes Wharf, Rancocas Creek, Pennsylvania.

=== 8 February ===
List of shipwrecks: 8 February 1903
Ship	State	Description
Brunswick	United States	The steamer went aground at Fort Bragg, California. Later refloated and repaired.
Southern Cross	Canada	The schooner capsized at Port Greville, Nova Scotia. She was later salvaged, repaired and returned to service.
Wm. S. McGowan	United States	The lighter sank at dock over night due to leaky seams at Boston, Massachusetts. Raised and repaired.

=== 11 February ===
List of shipwrecks: 11 February 1903
Ship	State	Description
Bay City	United States	The steamer was lost to fire at West Point, Washington, between Seattle and Ballard.

=== 16 February ===
List of shipwrecks: 16 February 1903
Ship	State	Description
Decantur	United States	The schooner was sunk in a severe squall at Newport News, Virginia. Later raised.
Olive	United States	The steamer foundered in what is described as a "hurricane" or "whirlwind" in the Chowan River that caused her to careen, and fill with water, she righted herself and sank between Mount Pleasant and Oliver's Wharf with only her pilothouse above water. 18 killed, her captain and 5 others were rescued from the pilothouse by Pettit (United States). Eight others left in a lifeboat and boarded a barge, from which they were rescued by Gazelle (United States).
Roger Quarles	United States	The schooner was sunk in a severe squall at Newport News, Virginia. Later raised.

=== 17 February ===
List of shipwrecks: 17 February 1903
Ship	State	Description
Ida	Canada	The barque was lost in a snowstorm off Blue Rocks, Nova Scotia.

=== 18 February ===
List of shipwrecks: 18 February 1903
Ship	State	Description
Charlotte	United States	The laid up steamer was destroyed by fire at Charlotte, New York, on the Genesee River.

=== 20 February ===
List of shipwrecks: 20 February 1903
Ship	State	Description
City of Clifton	United States	The steamer was destroyed by fire in the Tennessee River at Clifton, Tennessee.

=== 21 February ===
List of shipwrecks: 21 February 1903
Ship	State	Description
William Schaubel Sr.	United States	The tow steamer sank at dock at Erie Basin, Brooklyn, New York due to a sheared rivet. Later raised.

=== 24 February ===
List of shipwrecks: 24 February 1903
Ship	State	Description
Commodore	United States	The steamer foundered at Miami, Missouri.

=== 26 February ===
List of shipwrecks: 26 February 1903
Ship	State	Description
Ottercaps	United Kingdom	The steamship was wrecked off Feunteun Aod, Finistère, France.

=== 27 February ===
List of shipwrecks: 27 February 1903
Ship	State	Description
Daisy	United Kingdom	The steamer ran aground and was wrecked three nautical miles (5.6 km; 3.5 mi) west of Polhawn Cove in Whitsand Bay.
Mouse	United Kingdom	The smack got into difficulties off Cardigan. All four people on board were rescued by Lizzie & Charles Leigh Clare ( Royal National Lifeboat Institution).

=== 28 February ===
List of shipwrecks: 28 February 1903
Ship	State	Description
Etruria	United Kingdom	The ocean liner ran aground on sand and mud in the entrance to Gedney Channel while leaving New York City. She was refloated late the same day, found to be undamaged, and proceeded with her voyage.
Excel	United States	The steamer struck a snag, capsized and sank at Lock No. 5 in the Little Kanawha River. Raised and repaired.

=== Unknown date ===
List of shipwrecks: Unknown date 1903
Ship	State	Description
Ambriz	France	The Cie Française Charbonnage et de la Batelage ("French Coaling & Shipping Co.") vessel was wrecked off the coast of Madagascar while serving as a coal depot ship.
L. H. Buhrman	United States	The steamer was destroyed by fire either in the Ohio River near Derby, Indiana on 25 February, or at Stevenson, Kentucky on the Cumberland River in March.
Luna	United Kingdom	The barque was on passage from New Zealand to Liverpool when she lost part of her mast and head gear off the Pendeen Lighthouse, and drifted onto the Brisons in a northwest–by–west gale and was wrecked. All the crew were lost.

== March ==
=== 1 March ===
List of shipwrecks: 1 March 1903
Ship	State	Description
Valley Queen	United States	The steamer burned on the Mississippi River near Bruinsburg Landing, a total loss.

=== 2 March ===
List of shipwrecks: 2 March 1903
Ship	State	Description
Bassinger	United States	The steamer burned at dock in Punta Gorda, Florida, a total loss.
Maggie	United States	The steamer struck a snag and sank on the Yazoo River near Simmons Landing, Mississippi, a total loss. One crewman killed.
Trojan	United States	The steamer burned to the waterline at Jacksonville, Florida.

=== 4 March ===
List of shipwrecks: 4 March 1903
Ship	State	Description
Charlie Curlin	United States	The steamer struck a submerged obstruction in the Green River between Calhoun, Kentucky and Livermore, Kentucky and sank. Raised and repaired.
Commodore	United States	The laid up steamer was sunk by an ice flow at St. Louis, Missouri. Scheduled to be raised after June.

=== 7 March ===
List of shipwrecks: 7 March 1903
Ship	State	Description
Neptune	United States	The ferry was wrecked when backed into by Margaret (United States) in the Ohio River between Pittsburgh, Pennsylvania and Allegheny, Pennsylvania.

=== 9 March ===
List of shipwrecks: 9 March 1903
Ship	State	Description
Alexandra	flag unknown	Alexandra Cyclone Leonta: The cargo ship was driven ashore at Townsville, Queensland, Australia.
Delta	United States	The steamer struck a snag in the Mississippi River near Mayersville, Mississippi and sank. Raised and repaired.

=== 10 March ===
List of shipwrecks: 10 March 1903
Ship	State	Description
Kongo Maru	Japan	The steamer foundered off Misaki, Japan.

=== 11 March ===
List of shipwrecks: 11 March 1903
Ship	State	Description
W. H. Flint	United States	The steamer struck a submerged buoy in the Ohio River near Louisville, Kentucky and sank. Raised and repaired.

=== 12 March ===
List of shipwrecks: 12 March 1903
Ship	State	Description
Albion	United Kingdom	The schooner was wrecked in West Bay, Dorset.

=== 13 March ===
List of shipwrecks: 13 March 1903
Ship	State	Description
Unknown car float	United States	A car float, under tow of Lowell M. Palmer (United States), sank in a collision in fog with the passenger steamer New Hampshire off Tenth St. in the East River. 14 rail cars on board rolled off as she sank.

=== 15 March ===
List of shipwrecks: 15 March 1903
Ship	State	Description
Harry No. 2	United States	The steamer burned at Charleroi, Pennsylvania. Later rebuilt.

=== 19 March ===
List of shipwrecks: 19 March 1903
Ship	State	Description
Metamora	United States	The steamer sank up to her 2nd deck in the Ocklawaha River in 20 feet (6.1 m) of water. Two crewmen killed. Raised in April, repaired and returned to service.
Varuna	United States	The steamer burned and sank in the Sacramento River near Meriden Landing, California when an oil lamp fell off a bulkhead, a total loss.

=== 20 March ===
List of shipwrecks: 20 March 1903
Ship	State	Description
Pilot	United States	The tug, while assisting steamer Winifred (United States) in the Delaware River off Marcus Hook, Pennsylvania, was run into by Winifred causing her to careen, fill and sink. Five crewmen were killed. Two crewmen were rescued by a barge towed by Winifred and one crewman climbed Winifred's anchor chain.

=== 23 March ===
List of shipwrecks: 23 March 1903
Ship	State	Description
Dreadnought	United States	The schooner was sunk in a collision with Huron (United States) in dense fog and heavy seas. The crew were rescued by Huron's boats.

=== 24 March ===
List of shipwrecks: 24 March 1903
Ship	State	Description
Finland	United States	Finland The passenger ship was driven ashore at Vlissingen, Zeeland, Netherlands. She was refloated and returned to service.
Mary E. Morse	United States	The schooner was sunk in a collision with Parthian (United States) in fog off Boston, Massachusetts. The crew were rescued by Parthian.

=== 27 March ===
List of shipwrecks: 27 March 1903
Ship	State	Description
William A. Kane	United States	The tow steamer was backing out of dock at Rivington Street, New York City and was caught on a spile causing her to capsize and sink. Her captain was killed. Later raised.

=== 31 March ===
List of shipwrecks: 31 March 1903
Ship	State	Description
Shamrock	United Kingdom	The steamer sprang a leak at Catherine Hill Bay, New South Wales, Australia, and sank. She was scrapped in situ after it was found she was too badly damaged to repair.

=== Unknown date ===
List of shipwrecks: Unknown date March 1903
Ship	State	Description
Hougomont	Flag unknown	The barque ran aground at Allonby, Cumbria, England. She was refloated, repaired, and returned to service.
L. H. Buhrman	United States	The steamer was destroyed by fire either in the Ohio River near Derby, Indiana on 25 February, or at Stevenson, Kentucky on the Cumberland River in March.

== April ==
=== 3 April ===
List of shipwrecks: 3 April 1903
Ship	State	Description
Albion River	United States	The steamer was wrecked in thick fog on Bodega Head, California.
J. C. L.	United States	The steamer burned due to an over turned lamp at Burlington, Vermont, a total loss.
John C. Fitzpatrick	United States	The 242-foot (73.8 m), 1,277-gross register ton schooner barge suffered an explosion and sank in 130 feet (40 m) of water in the North Atlantic Ocean south of Long Island near East Hampton, New York. Her entire crew of five perished.
Unknown barge	United States	A dumper barge, under tow of Franklin N. Brown (United States), sank while being towed to sea from New York City off the Whistling Buoy. Her only crewman died.

=== 9 April ===
List of shipwrecks: 9 April 1903
Ship	State	Description
Victoria	United Kingdom	Shortly after the steamer Albion River was wrecked on 3 April, another Swayne & Hoyt owned steamer ran ashore on Little Bamboo Island in the Straits of Pechili and became a total loss.

=== 13 April ===
List of shipwrecks: 13 April 1903
Ship	State	Description
Margaret Ward	United States	The schooner was sunk in a collision with El Rio in dense fog, either at the Entrance to Galveston Harbor, or 28 miles (45 km) south east of Galveston in 8 1/2 fathoms (51 ft; 15.5 m) of water, which ever place, it was shallow enough for the wreck to be marked with a buoy.

=== 21 April ===
List of shipwrecks: 21 April 1903
Ship	State	Description
Freia	Norway	The steamer was wrecked near Scharhörn on her passage from Kristiana to Harlingen, Friesland, Netherlands.

=== 28 April ===
List of shipwrecks: 28 April 1903
Ship	State	Description
Maud Kilgore	United States	The steamer foundered at the mouth of the La Anguille River. Raised and repaired.

=== 29 April ===
List of shipwrecks: 29 April 1903
Ship	State	Description
Belle P. Cross	United States	The steamer was wrecked in a blizzard and gale on a reef off Gooseberry River on the north shore of Lake Superior and broke up.

=== 30 April ===
List of shipwrecks: 30 April 1903
Ship	State	Description
Clarence	United States	The steamer was destroyed by fire at dock in Charleston, South Carolina.

== May ==
=== 1 May ===
List of shipwrecks: 1 May 1903
Ship	State	Description
Fedelia	United States	The barge sprung a leak and sank near Hen and Chickens Light.
Unknown canal boat	United States	A canal boat, under tow, was sunk in a collision with another towed canal boat off Sixth Street, Jersey City, New Jersey.

=== 5 May ===
List of shipwrecks: 5 May 1903
Ship	State	Description
Saginaw	United States	The steamer was sunk in a collision with Hamilton (United States) in dense fog off Hog Island, Virginia. Eight passengers and six crew were killed. 21 crew and 11 passengers were rescued by Hamilton's boats, but one stewardess died in the boat.

=== 6 May ===
List of shipwrecks: 6 May 1903
Ship	State	Description
Gloriana	United States	The fishing schooner was wrecked off Whale Cove near White Point Ledges. Her captain and 14 crew died, 3 made it to shore.

=== 9 May ===
List of shipwrecks: 9 May 1903
Ship	State	Description
Olympia	Canada	The schooner was wrecked off Sable Island, Nova Scotia.

=== 12 May ===
List of shipwrecks: 12 May 1903
Ship	State	Description
Quaker City	United States	The 46-gross register ton screw steamer sank in the Delaware River after colliding with the steam screw tug Harry M. Wall (United States) off Chestnut Street Wharf in Camden, New Jersey. Harry M. Wall tried to beach Quaker City, but she sank on the east side of the Ship Channel before she could be beached. All six people aboard Quaker City survived.

=== 18 May ===
List of shipwrecks: 18 May 1903
Ship	State	Description
Edward Gillen	United States	The tug was sunk in a collision in fog with Maunaloa (United States) at the entrance to Duluth, Minnesota-Superior, Wisconsin Harbor. One crewman killed. Raised and repaired.

=== 20 May ===
List of shipwrecks: 20 May 1903
Ship	State	Description
Pfohl	United States	The steamer was destroyed by fire 20 miles (32 km) north west of Goderich, Ontario.
Unknown schooner	United States	A schooner sank in a collision with a barge under the tow of steamer Cuba (United States) off Cape Cod. The crew transferred by small boat to the barge.

=== 25 May ===
List of shipwrecks: 25 May 1903
Ship	State	Description
Falcon	United States	The steamer burned at dock in Satilla River.
M. Dougherty	United States	The steamer sprung a leak and sank at Brown's Station, Pennsylvania. Raised, repaired and returned to service.

=== 26 May ===
List of shipwrecks: 26 May 1903
Ship	State	Description
Huddersfield	United Kingdom	On leaving Antwerp, the passenger-cargo ship was in collision in the River Scheldt with the steamer Uto (Norway). All 17 members of her crew were saved but all 22 of her passengers – emigrants from Galicia on their way to Canada – drowned.
Oakland	Australia	The passenger-cargo ship foundered in mountainous seas in the Tasman Sea near Cabbage Tree Island off New South Wales, Australia, with the loss of 11 lives. The steamer Bellinger (flag unknown) rescued her seven survivors.

=== 28 May ===
List of shipwrecks: 28 May 1903
Ship	State	Description
Nellie Walton	United States	The steamer capsized and sank when the coal barge she was towing grounded at "The Trap" in the Ohio River. The wreck was abandoned. Her engines and other machinery was salvaged and placed in another steamer.

=== 29 May ===
List of shipwrecks: 29 May 1903
Ship	State	Description
Nord	France	The steamer ran aground and was wrecked on Burhou Island off Alderney Channel Islands on a voyage from Boulogne to Bayonne with general cargo.
St. Lawrence	United Kingdom	The bucket hopper dredger, on delivery by new owners, sailed Gibraltar for Hull, Yorkshire with fourteen on board, and was not heard from again. A subsequent inquiry determined that the vessel was overladen and had insufficient freeboard.

=== 30 May ===
List of shipwrecks: 30 May 1903
Ship	State	Description
Jack Rabbit	United States	The steamer struck a snag and sank in the White River near Sibleys Island.

=== 31 May ===
List of shipwrecks: 31 May 1903
Ship	State	Description
Helen	United States	The launch burned at dock in Dover Point, New Hampshire.
Mike Bauer	United States	The steamer broke loose from her dock at Kansas City, Kansas and was swept by a strong current in the Kaw River into bridge piers and sunk. Total loss.
Nellie	United States	The steamer was sunk at Wetherill's Wharf, Cohansey Creek, New Jersey when a falling tide dropped her on a stump punching a hole in her bottom.

=== Unknown date ===
List of shipwrecks: Unknown May 1903
Ship	State	Description
Columbia	United States	The steamer caught fire and sank at dock in Washington, D.C. on 10 or 13 May.
Luna	United States	The steamer was lost to fire in the Detroit River at the foot of Chase Street, Detroit on 18 or 25 May.

== June ==
=== 3 June ===
List of shipwrecks: 3 June 1903
Ship	State	Description
Flying Eagle	United States	The stern paddle wheel steamer, towing the excursion barge Little Gate, while passing under the Wabash Railroad Bridge at Hannibal, Missouri was turned sideways by the current striking the bridge piers with her stern and then backing into the riverbank destroying her paddle wheel, rendering her helpless. She sank in 40 feet (12 m) of water below the bridge, a total loss. Three passengers and one crewman killed, either from the ship or the barge. Survivors climbed onto the bridge or were rescued by a ferry and skiffs.
Little Gate	United States	The excursion barge struck the Wabash Railroad Bridge at Hannibal, Missouri and turned on her side after her tow steamer was wrecked, she drifted down stream and eventually drifted ashore. Three passengers and one crewman killed, either from the ship or the barge. Survivors climbed onto the bridge or were rescued by a ferry and skiffs.

=== 5 June ===
List of shipwrecks: 5 June 1903
Ship	State	Description
Empire State	United States	The laid up steamer was destroyed by fire over night at dock at Kingston, Ontario.

=== 7 June ===
List of shipwrecks: 7 June 1903
Ship	State	Description
Liban	France	The passenger steamer sank following a collision with Insulaire near the port of Marseille. Estimates of those lost varied widely as no accurate count of the passengers and crew was made before sailing. Conservative estimates put the death toll at 97 out of between 200–240 persons aboard. Some estimates of the lost were near twice that number. The vast majority of fatalities were women and children.
Olivette	United States	The steamer struck a rock and sank at Six Mile Island in the Allegheny River. Raised and repaired.

=== 9 June ===
List of shipwrecks: 9 June 1903
Ship	State	Description
Otto	United States	The laid up steamer burned at Freeport, Florida, probably arson.

=== 10 June ===
List of shipwrecks: 10 June 1903
Ship	State	Description
Puritan	United States	The canal boat sank at dock at Jersey City, New Jersey.
Rubens	Belgium	The steamer capsized and sank in the North Sea. Eleven crew killed, four rescued by Privo (Norway).

=== 12 June ===
List of shipwrecks: 12 June 1903
Ship	State	Description
Ariel	United States	The steamer sunk by flooding while hauled out for repairs at Lexington, Missouri. Total loss.
Washington B. Thomas	United States	Carrying a cargo of coal, the 287-foot (87 m), 2,638-gross register ton five-masted schooner — which had been launched only two months earlier — dragged her anchor during a gale and was wrecked on a reef just off the east side of Stratton Island in Saco Bay off Prouts Neck, Maine, at 43°30′12.30″N 070°18′22.17″W. The captain's wife was the only fatality. The wreck settled in shallow water.

=== 13 June ===
List of shipwrecks: 13 June 1903
Ship	State	Description
Charles H. Davis	United States	The steamer foundered in a severe gale and heavy seas in Lake Erie 1,500 feet (460 m) off the light for Cleveland, Ohio in 38 feet (12 m) of water, a total loss. Her master was killed, two tugs rescued the rest of the crew.

=== 17 June ===
List of shipwrecks: 17 June 1903
Ship	State	Description
HMS Scorpion	Royal Navy	The decommissioned Scorpion-class ironclad turret ship foundered in the Atlantic Ocean while under tow from the United Kingdom to the United States for scrapping.

=== 23 June ===
List of shipwrecks: 23 June 1903
Ship	State	Description
O. W. Cheney	United States	The tug was sunk in a collision with Chemung (United States) on Lake Erie near Point Albino, Canada, or Windmill Point, Ontario. Three crewmen killed.

=== 25 June ===
List of shipwrecks: 25 June 1903
Ship	State	Description
Bolinas	United States	The motorboat struck a snag near Isleton, California in the Sacramento River and was beached and repaired.
Vicksburg	United States	The steamer struck a submerged piling during a rapid drop in river level and sank at dock in the Mississippi River at Vicksburg, Mississippi.

=== 30 June ===
List of shipwrecks: 30 June 1903
Ship	State	Description
James G. Swan	United States	The 44-ton sealing schooner sank on the coast of the District of Alaska.
M. M. Morill	United States	The 43-ton sealing schooner sank without loss of life on the coast of the District of Alaska.
Thomas D. Stimson	United States	The steamer was destroyed by fire in the St. Clair River. Removal of wreck completed 13 August.

== July ==
=== 2 July ===
List of shipwrecks: 2 July 1903
Ship	State	Description
Eltinge Anderson	United States	The ferry was destroyed by fire between Athens, New York and Coxsackie, New York.

=== 5 July ===
List of shipwrecks: 5 July 1903
Ship	State	Description
Valetta	United Kingdom	The 105-foot (32 m), 144-ton steam trawler was sunk in a collision in the North Sea off Harlingen, Netherlands.

=== 8 July ===
List of shipwrecks: 8 July 1903
Ship	State	Description
Lucille Nowland	United States	The steamer struck a submerged obstruction in the Arkansas River near Fites Landing and sank. One crewman killed.

=== 13 July ===
List of shipwrecks: 13 July 1903
Ship	State	Description
Champion	United States	The schooner sank in the St. Clair River near the head of Russell Island. Wreck removed by 3 September.

=== 14 July ===
List of shipwrecks: 14 July 1903
Ship	State	Description
Monterey	United Kingdom	The 5,455 GRT cargo steamer on a voyage from Montreal to Bristol and Liverpool with a cargo of cattle, lumber and foodstuffs ran aground near the Plate Point Lighthouse on the island of Petite Miquelon, and was subsequently abandoned.

=== 17 July ===
List of shipwrecks: 17 July 1903
Ship	State	Description
Contrivance	United States	The sloop was sunk in a collision with Central Hudson (United States) above Esopus Lighthouse in the Hudson River. Her captain died.

=== 18 July ===
List of shipwrecks: 18 July 1903
Ship	State	Description
Contrivance	United States	The sloop was sunk in a collision with Central Hudson (United States) off Esopus Light in the Hudson River. Her captain was killed.

=== 19 July ===
List of shipwrecks: 19 July 1903
Ship	State	Description
North Pacific	United States	North Pacific sinking with an insurance launch alongside. The sidewheel paddle steamer went off course in fog, struck a rock, and sank off Marrowstone Island, Washington, in deep water, a total loss. Crew and passengers reached shore in her boats.

=== 22 July ===
List of shipwrecks: 22 July 1903
Ship	State	Description
Gardner	United States	The laid up tug sank at dock when struck by Eastland (United States) at the Lake Street Bridge, Chicago, Illinois.
Waverly	United States	The steamer sunk in a collision on Lake Huron with Turret Court (Canada).

=== 23 July ===
List of shipwrecks: 23 July 1903
Ship	State	Description
Light Guard	United States	The wooden schooner barge was scuttled in 7 feet (2.1 m) of water in Lake Huron off the coast of Michigan at 45.05°N 83.383333°W and abandoned.
Walsh	United States	The steamer burned at Port Orchard, Washington.

=== 24 July ===
List of shipwrecks: 24 July 1903
Ship	State	Description
Shawmut	United States	The fuel scow was damaged when rammed at the Lackawanna Coal dock, Buffalo, New York, by Mahoning (United States). She drifted around the end of the dock and sank.

=== 25 July ===
List of shipwrecks: 25 July 1903
Ship	State	Description
Knight Templar	United States	The wooden schooner barge was scuttled in 5 feet (1.5 m) of water in Lake Huron off the coast of Michigan at 45.05°N 83.366667°W and abandoned.
V. Swain	United States	The steamer was sunk at dock at Two Harbors, Minnesota when a bilge pump failed. Raised and beached in Howard's Bay to await repairs.

=== 27 July ===
List of shipwrecks: 27 July 1903
Ship	State	Description
Southwark	United States	The steamer burned to the waterline at Pier 28 South, Philadelphia.

== August ==
=== 2 August ===
List of shipwrecks: 2 August 1903
Ship	State	Description
Tennie and Laura	United States	During a voyage from Muskegon, Michigan, to Milwaukee, Wisconsin, with a cargo of lumber, the two-masted scow schooner capsized and sank in Lake Michigan northeast of Milwaukee and nine nautical miles (17 km) southeast of Port Washington, Wisconsin. One of her two-man crew died. Her wreck lies in 325 feet (99 m) of water at 43°41.494′N 087°33.298′W in the Wisconsin Shipwreck Coast National Marine Sanctuary.

=== 3 August ===
List of shipwrecks: 3 August 1903
Ship	State	Description
Amiral Gueydon	France	The steamer caught fire on 30 July 46 miles (74 km) off Socotra Island in the Indian Ocean after an explosion of either her boiler or volatile material in her cargo in heavy seas. The crew fought the fire until the ship was wrecked on the Arabian Peninsula half way between Aden and Muscat at Ras Haseik. The Sheik of Merbat learned of the castaways and sent three small boats that picked up the crew on 15 September. They were then rescued at sea by Trouvon (Russia) on 19 August.

=== 4 August ===
List of shipwrecks: 4 August 1903
Ship	State	Description
Scow No. 23	United States	The scow sprung a leak and sank near Popasquash Point, Rhode Island in Narragansett Bay.

=== 5 August ===
List of shipwrecks: 5 August 1903
Ship	State	Description
Bradley	United States	The barge foundered in a strong gale and heavy seas five miles (8.0 km) off Montauk Point, New York. The crew were rescued by her tow steamer Mars (United States).
Monarch	United States	The barge foundered in a strong gale and heavy seas five miles (8.0 km) off Montauk Point, New York. The crew were rescued by her tow steamer Mars (United States).

=== 6 August ===
List of shipwrecks: 6 August 1903
Ship	State	Description
John E. Thropp	United States	The steamer was sunk off Bristol, Pennsylvania when she collided with a barge towed by Eva Belle Cain (United States). Her crew was rescued by Eva Belle Cain.

=== 7 August ===
List of shipwrecks: 7 August 1903
Ship	State	Description
Metropole	United States	The steamer sprang a leak and sank in Saginaw Bay. The crew made it to shore in the ship's boat.

=== 8 August ===
List of shipwrecks: 8 August 1903
Ship	State	Description
Dana B. Wotkyns	United States	The tug was destroyed by fire between Albany, New York and Troy, New York off Breaker Island.

=== 9 August ===
List of shipwrecks: 9 August 1903
Ship	State	Description
Volunteer	United States	The barge sprung a leak and sank between Point Judith, Rhode Island and Beavertail Lighthouse.

=== 11 August ===
List of shipwrecks: 11 August 1903
Ship	State	Description
Daisy	United States	The launch was sunk in a collision with Pokomoke (United States), probably at Norfolk, Virginia.
Henry	United States	The tow steamer sprung a leak on Lake Erie off Cleveland, Ohio and was beached.

=== 12 August ===
List of shipwrecks: 12 August 1903
Ship	State	Description
D. Maria Amelia	United States	The steamer caught fire off Boston, Massachusetts and was beached where she burned to the waterline. She later floated off and sank, a total loss.

=== 13 August ===
List of shipwrecks: 13 August 1903
Ship	State	Description
Waiontha	United States	The steamer was destroyed by fire below Shears Shoal in the Connecticut River.

=== 17 August ===
List of shipwrecks: 17 August 1903
Ship	State	Description
Huan T'ai	Imperial Chinese Navy	The Kai Chi-class unprotected cruiser sank off Hong Kong after colliding with the passenger ship Empress of India (United Kingdom).
Mary	United States	The steamer sank at dock at the foot of Dubois Street, Detroit, Michigan. Later scheduled to be raised.

=== 18 August ===
List of shipwrecks: 18 August 1903
Ship	State	Description
John J. White	United States	The laid up tow steamer sank at dock at the foot of Essex Street, Jersey City, New Jersey for unknown reasons. Raised and repaired.

=== 20 August ===
List of shipwrecks: 20 August 1903
Ship	State	Description
Massina	United States	The steamer was destroyed by fire over night at dock in Ogdensburg, New York.
Queen of the West	United States	The steamer sprung a leak in heavy seas on Lake Erie off Fairport, Ohio and sank, a total loss. Crew rescued by Cordorus (United States), one crewman reportedly died while abandoning ship.
Sea King	United Kingdom	Hit and sunk by the steam hopper Frome whilst at anchor at Kingroad near what is now Portbury Dock. One crew member drowned.

=== 21 August ===
List of shipwrecks: 21 August 1903
Ship	State	Description
Oslyabya	Imperial Russian Navy	The Peresvet-class battleship ran aground in the Strait of Gibraltar. She was refloated and repaired and she returned to active service in late November.

=== 23 August ===
List of shipwrecks: 23 August 1903
Ship	State	Description
Narara	Australia	The screw steamer burned to the waterline and was scuttled at her moorings at Sackville, New South Wales, Australia. Her crew survived. She was refloated, repaired, and returned to service.

=== 25 August ===
List of shipwrecks: 25 August 1903
Ship	State	Description
Myrtle	United States	The steamer was destroyed by fire at Thousand Island Park in the St. Lawrence River due to an exploding lamp.

=== 26 August ===
List of shipwrecks: 26 August 1903
Ship	State	Description
John Booth	United States	The schooner was cut in half and sunk in a collision with H. M. Whitney ten miles (16 km) east of Stratford Shoal. Five crewmen and a friend of the captain were killed.
Oneida	United States	The tug sank at dock in Tonawanda, New York over night for unknown reasons. Later raised with no damage found.

=== Unknown date ===
List of shipwrecks: Unknown date 1903
Ship	State	Description
Cyclone	United States	The steamer, being used as a launch tender, was lost at Baron Koff Bay, Kamchatka, Siberia.
Enterprise	Canada	The steamship sank in August 1903 while docking at Barrie, Ontario, following a major mechanical failure. She was later refloated and scuttled in deeper waters. No lives were lost.
George W. Kelley	United States	1903 Jamaica hurricane: The steamer sank in the Hurricane between Central America and New Orleans after leaving Bluefields, Nicaragua on 9 August. Lost with everyone on board, all 18 crewmen and 1 passenger.
Vigilant	United States	Operating on the Ketchikan mail route, the steam tug was wrecked when her helmsman fell asleep at her wheel and she ran onto rocks at full speed on Fox Island in northeastern Dixon Entrance off Cape Fox, District of Alaska. One crewman was injured.

== September ==
=== 2 September ===
List of shipwrecks: 2 September 1903
Ship	State	Description
Clipper	United States	The steamer burned at Walton's Coal Works on the Monongahela River, a total loss.

=== 4 September ===
List of shipwrecks: 4 September 1903
Ship	State	Description
Abbie M. Deering	United States	The 101-gross register ton, 90.5-foot (27.6 m) schooner was wrecked on a reef off Baby Island (53.9974°N 166.0616°W) in the northwestern part of Akutan Pass (54°00′N 166°10′W) in the Aleutian Islands and was deemed a total loss. Leaving her first mate in charge of the wreck, the revenue cutter USRC Manning ( United States Revenue Cutter Service) took off 38 passengers and eight crew members.
Pittsburg	United States	The dredge sprung a leak and sank in the Allegheny River below 43rd Street, Pittsburgh, Pennsylvania. Raised and repaired.

=== 5 September ===
List of shipwrecks: 5 September 1903
Ship	State	Description
Jennie R. Dubois	United States	Carrying a cargo of coal, the 249-foot (76 m), 2,227-gross register ton five-masted schooner sank in 90 feet (27 m) of water in the Atlantic Ocean off Rhode Island 5 nautical miles (9.3 km) southeast of Southeast Light on Block Island within five minutes of colliding with the cargo steamer Schonfels (Germany). Schonfels rescued her entire crew of 11 men.

=== 7 September ===
List of shipwrecks: 7 September 1903
Ship	State	Description
J. P. Gage	United States	The steamer struck an obstruction at St. Charles, Missouri and sank. Total loss.
R. Kanters	United States	The schooner was wrecked in a storm south of Manistee, Michigan. Total loss. Wreck discovered 19 April 2020.

=== 9 September ===
List of shipwrecks: 9 September 1903
Ship	State	Description
W. T. Scovell	United States	The steamer struck an obstruction and sank between New Orleans and Shreveport, Louisiana. Raised on 11 September.
Wa Wa	United States	The pleasure steamer burned at Burlington, Vermont, a total loss.

=== 10 September ===
List of shipwrecks: 10 September 1903
Ship	State	Description
Glenfeadon	United Kingdom	The schooner was driven ashore at The Mumbles, Glamorgan. She was refloated the next day.
Ierne	United Kingdom	The ship foundered in the Bristol Channel with the loss of all hands. She was on a voyage from Newport, Monmouthshire to Dublin.
J. K. Allport	United Kingdom	The ship foundered in the Bristol Channel.

=== 11 September ===
List of shipwrecks: 11 September 1903
Ship	State	Description
Inchulva	United States	The steamer sank in Delray Beach, Florida opposite the beach in what was later termed the Delray Wreck. Nine crewman died.

=== 12 September ===
List of shipwrecks: 12 September 1903
Ship	State	Description
Park Bluff	United States	The steamer sank in the St. Croix River opposite Stillwater, Minnesota. One crewman killed.

=== 14 September ===
List of shipwrecks: 14 September 1903
Ship	State	Description
Eunola	United States	The steamer burned at dock in Chattahoochee, Florida, a total loss.

=== 15 September ===
List of shipwrecks: 15 September 1903
Ship	State	Description
Champion	United States	The steamer burned at anchor in Put-In-Bay, Ohio.
Howard B. Peck	United States	In the evening of 15 September 1903, while between Cape Poge and Cross Rip Shoal in hazy weather, schooner Howard B. Peck, on her way from Norfolk for Calais with cargo of coal was struck on her port bow by steamer Kiowa, on passage from Boston to Charleston. The schooner had her bowsprit and flying jibboom carried away together with all sails and rigging, and had a 20-foot (6.1 m)-wide gap opened in her hull. The schooner was towed by Kiowa into Vineyard Haven on the same day and after undergoing repairs worth about US$2,500, returned to service. Kiowa suffered little damage and was able to continue on her voyage.

=== 16 September ===
List of shipwrecks: 16 September 1903
Ship	State	Description
Alma	United States	The steamer burned and sank at a wharf, probably at Norfolk, Virginia.
Ceres	United States	The yacht sank in a storm at the New Haven Yacht Club, New Haven, Connecticut. Her hull was a total loss, her machinery was scheduled to be salvaged.
Gilberton	United States	1903 New Jersey hurricane: The 841-gross register ton schooner barge sank on Brown Shoal off the coast of Delaware. All three people on board survived.
John R. Williams	United States	The tug was destroyed by fire between Albany, New York and Athens, New York off Castleton-on-Hudson, New York.
S. E. Spring	United States	The passenger steamer went ashore in a severe storm at Woods Point, Indian Harbor, New York on Long Island.
Spartan	United States	1903 New Jersey hurricane: The tug sank in a hurricane in Delaware Bay below Brow Shoal. Two crewmen killed.
Welcome	United States	The steamer was wrecked two miles (3.2 km) west of Charlevoix Bay.

=== 17 September ===
List of shipwrecks: 17 September 1903
Ship	State	Description
Narragansett	United States	The barge sank in a severe storm, probably off New York.

=== 19 September ===
List of shipwrecks: 19 September 1903
Ship	State	Description
A. A. Parker	United States	The steamer sprang a leak and foundered in 120 feet (37 m) of water in a gale 4 miles (6.4 km) off Grand Marais, Minnesota. The crew were rescued by the United States Life Saving Service.

=== 21 September ===
List of shipwrecks: 21 September 1903
Ship	State	Description
Charles S. Parnell	United States	The tug capsized while towing a steamer near Little Island in Tonawanda Harbor.

=== 26 September ===
List of shipwrecks: 26 September 1903
Ship	State	Description
Harold	United States	The barge sank off Staten Island, New York. She was carrying jewels belonging to the Guggenheim family.

=== 27 September ===
List of shipwrecks: 27 September 1903
Ship	State	Description
Meriden	United States	The steamer burned at dock in Toledo, Ohio, possibly due to an exploding lamp, a total loss.

=== 29 September ===
List of shipwrecks: 29 September 1903
Ship	State	Description
Bida	United Kingdom	The Elder Dempster 1,477 GRT cargo ship caught fire in the North Sea during a voyage from Lagos, Southern Nigeria Protectorate, to Hamburg, Germany, with a cargo of palm kernels and was abandoned 45 nautical miles (83 km) south by east of the Maas lightship (Belgium).

=== 30 September ===
List of shipwrecks: 30 September 1903
Ship	State	Description
Sara	United States	The steamer struck rocks at "Chain of Rocks" in the Yukon River and sank in 5 1/2 feet (1.7 m) of water.

=== Unknown date ===
List of shipwrecks: Unknown date 1903
Ship	State	Description
Enterprise	United Kingdom	The ship lost her sails and was wrecked in hurricane-force winds off St Ives, Cornwall, England. The three crew were rescued by lifeboat.
Joe	United States	The steamer was wrecked one mile (1.6 km) south of Holland, Michigan on 26 September, or near Grand Haven, Michigan on 29 November.
Moonlight	United States	The schooner sank in Lake Superior off Michigan Island, Wisconsin.
William Clark	United States	The 37-gross register ton schooner was stranded at Bay Ridge, New York. All three people aboard survived.

== October ==
=== 1 October ===
List of shipwrecks: 1 October 1903
Ship	State	Description
Celtic	United States	The steamer foundered one-half mile (0.80 km) south west of Saybrook, Connecticut. Her machinery was salvaged.
Oregon	United States	The steamer was destroyed by fire over night at dock at Fisherworks Wharf, Black Point, Connecticut.

=== 3 October ===
List of shipwrecks: 16 October 1903
Ship	State	Description
Erie L. Hackley	United States	The steamer foundered in heavy squall an hour out of Egg Harbor, Wisconsin in Green Bay. Her captain, two crewmen and eight passengers were killed. Eight survivors were rescued the next day by a passing ship.

=== 4 October ===
List of shipwrecks: 4 October 1903
Ship	State	Description
Benjamin Sewall	United States	The schooner was heavily damaged by a typhoon and abandoned off Formosa. The survivors sailed to Botel Tobago Island, off Formosa, on 5 October in a lifeboat. Six of the survivors drowned when their lifeboat overturned after it was damaged in an attack by natives. The natives rescued one Japanese woman.

=== 7 October ===
List of shipwrecks: 7 October 1903
Ship	State	Description
Adventure	United States	The steamer was destroyed by fire at the Kelly Island Lime and Transport Co. dock in Kelleys Island, Ohio.
Mary McLane	United States	The steamer was destroyed by fire at Sour Spring Grove Dock in the Niagara River.
Rover	United States	The freighter grounded on West Way causing a leak and was beached.

=== 8 October ===
List of shipwrecks: 8 October 1903
Ship	State	Description
General Rivera	National Navy of Uruguay	The General Rivera-class gunboat sank after an internal explosion.

=== 9 October ===
List of shipwrecks: 9 October 1903
Ship	State	Description
Admiral	United States	The motorboat capsized in a squall in San Francisco Bay. One passenger and one crewman killed.
J. R. Sharp	United States	The steamer sprang a leak at dock at Jones Landing, Georgia on the Flint River and sank.
John N. Glidden	United States	The steamer was sunk in a collision with the barge Magna in the St. Clair Flats Ship Canal, a total loss. The wreck was removed over a period of months ending in May 1904.

=== 10 October ===
List of shipwrecks: 10 October 1903
Ship	State	Description
Louisa	United States	The steamer struck a snag in the Santee River and sank.
Mermaid	United States	The 9-gross register ton motor vessel burned at Mukilteo, Washington. The only person on board survived.
Nellie	United States	The steamer struck a snag near the head of Willamette Slough, Oregon damaging a plank and she was beached in shallow water.
Sunshine	United States	The steamer struck a submerged obstruction in the Ohio River at Marshalls Landing, Kentucky and sank. Raised and repaired.

=== 11 October ===
List of shipwrecks: 11 October 1903
Ship	State	Description
Itasca	United States	The steamer sank in the Rainy River when cargo shifted. Later raised undamaged.
John L. Day	United States	The steamer sank at Ocmulgee Depot in the Ocmulgee River.

=== 12 October ===
List of shipwrecks: 12 October 1903
Ship	State	Description
John J. Healy	United States	The river steamer was lost at St. Michael, District of Alaska.
Unidentified canal boat	United States	The canal boat, under tow of Empire (United States), sank in a collision with the steamer Leonidus in the East River.

=== 15 October ===
List of shipwrecks: 15 October 1903
Ship	State	Description
Gerald C.	United States	The boat struck the Nestucca Bar, Nestucca Bay and went ashore. Refloated on 3 November.
Marquette	United States	The lake freighter sank in Lake Superior about five nautical miles (9.3 km; 5.8 mi) east of Michigan Island.
Spy	United States	The fishing steamer was destroyed by fire at dock in Tiverton, Rhode Island.

=== 17 October ===
List of shipwrecks: 17 October 1903
Ship	State	Description
Carnsew	United Kingdom	The coastal steamer collided with the steamer Everest (flag unknown) and sank off Bull Point, North Devon, United Kingdom. All the crew survived.
Champion No. 2	United States	The ferry was holed in the hull and sank at Gallipolis, Ohio. Raised and repaired.
Frida Horn	Germany	The cargo vessel was wrecked on Sommers Island, or Lille Sommarö Island in the Gulf of Finland.

=== 19 October ===
List of shipwrecks: 19 October 1903
Ship	State	Description
South Portland	United States	The steamer struck a rock in thick fog off Cape Blanco, Oregon and sank in 45 minutes. Eight passengers, two stowaways, and nine crewmen died, five of those from exposure on life rafts.

=== 23 October ===
List of shipwrecks: 23 October 1903
Ship	State	Description
Florence Marmet	United States	The steamer struck a submerged obstruction in the Ohio River near the mouth of the Little Miami River and sank. Raised and repaired.

=== 25 October ===
List of shipwrecks: 25 October 1903
Ship	State	Description
Emma Maria	Russia	The schooner was driven ashore and wrecked at Chesil Beach, Dorset, United Kingdom.
Rainier	United States	The 179-gross register ton, 81.4-foot (24.8 m) fishing steamer was wrecked on an uncharted rock in Icy Strait in the Alexander Archipelago in Southeast Alaska, 1.5 nautical miles (2.8 km; 1.7 mi) roughly west-northwest of "Spasskaia Island," now called Spasski Island (58°06′15″N 135°17′20″W). All 25 members of her crew survived.

=== 26 October ===
List of shipwrecks: 26 October 1903
Ship	State	Description
Columbia	United States	The steamer sprang a leak and was beached in Saginaw Bay.
Manhattan	United States	The steamer's steering gear failed causing her to ground on Grand Island, Michigan. She then burned to the waterline, a total loss. Her machinery was salvaged. The wreck was dynamited later.
Patria	Norway	The barque was driven ashore and wrecked at Chesil Beach, Dorset, United Kingdom.
Silver Spray	United States	The fishing tug burned to the keel in drydock at Buffalo, New York. Repaired and returned to service.
William F. Sauber	United States	The steamer foundered in heavy seas on Lake Superior off Whitefish Point. Her captain and one crewman killed. Survivors were rescued by Yale (United States).

=== 29 October ===
List of shipwrecks: 29 October 1903
Ship	State	Description
Lotus Sims	United States	The steamer was destroyed by fire at St. Louis, Missouri, a total loss.
Unidentified sailing vessel	Japan	During a voyage from Awa Province to Manazuru, the sailing vessel was wrecked during a storm 24 miles (39 km) from Izu Ōshima, Japan. The cruiser Bugeaud (French Navy) rescued her seven survivors under difficult conditions and delivered them to Yokohama on 30 October.

=== 30 October ===
List of shipwrecks: 30 October 1903
Ship	State	Description
City of St. Louis	United States	The steamer was destroyed by fire at St. Louis, Missouri and sank. One crewman missing. Total loss.

=== 31 October ===
List of shipwrecks: 31 October 1903
Ship	State	Description
Saveland	United States	The schooner broke loose from her tow in a snowstorm and went ashore one mile (1.6 km) east of Grand Marais, Minnesota, a total loss. The crew were saved by the United States Life Saving Service.

== November ==
=== 1 November ===
List of shipwrecks: 1 November 1903
Ship	State	Description
Discovery	United States	The 209-gross register ton, 90-foot (27.4 m) steamer departed Yakutat, District of Alaska, with an estimated 30 people – about 14 passengers and a crew of about 16 – aboard and was never heard from again. In 1904, authorities received a credible report by an Alaskan Native chief that he had seen Discovery sink in a storm just outside Lituya Bay in Southeast Alaska on 3 November 1903 with no survivors.

=== 2 November ===
List of shipwrecks: 2 November 1903
Ship	State	Description
Petroleum #1	United States	Carrying a cargo of three tons of miscellaneous merchandise and under tow by a motor launch from Katalla, District of Alaska, to Kayak Island off Southcentral Alaska, the 18-net register ton scow sank in a gale in the Gulf of Alaska off Kayak Island after her tow line parted.

=== 3 November ===
List of shipwrecks: 3 November 1903
Ship	State	Description
Peerless	United States	The steamer caught fire at sea after being stolen by 4 boys from her dock at Eureka, California. The tug Ranger caught up with the steamer, rescued the boys and beached the steamer in Humboldt Bay, a total loss.

=== 4 November ===
List of shipwrecks: 4 November 1903
Ship	State	Description
Walter L. Frost	United States	The steamer ran aground in fog on south end of South Manitou Island, in Lake Michigan. She was scuttled to prevent further damage, refloated on the 6th but rescuttled for unknown reasons. She broke in two on 10 November and was abandoned on 14 November. Completely went to pieces over the winter.

=== 7 November ===
List of shipwrecks: 7 November 1903
Ship	State	Description
Connecticut	United States	The 99-gross register ton schooner sank off Chatham, Massachusetts. Both people on board survived.

=== 9 November ===
List of shipwrecks: 9 November 1903
Ship	State	Description
Imnaha	United States	The steamer snagged a mooring line causing her to drift in to the Mountain Sheep Rapids on the Snake River and was wrecked.

=== 11 November ===
List of shipwrecks: 11 November 1903
Ship	State	Description
Ruth	United States	The steamer broke a mooring line at Bihlers Point Landing, California allowing her to be damaged on a rock. She drifted ashore, a total loss.

=== 12 November ===
List of shipwrecks: 12 November 1903
Ship	State	Description
S. C. Baldwin	United States	The steamer was sunk by ice 7 1/2 miles (12.1 km) north east of Long Tail Point.

=== 13 November ===
List of shipwrecks: 13 November 1903
Ship	State	Description
Cassie	United States	The sloop was sunk in a collision with Albemarle (United States), apparently in Virginia. One man drowned.

=== 14 November ===
List of shipwrecks: 14 November 1903
Ship	State	Description
Pioneer	United States	The motor vessel struck a submerged object and sank in Chesapeake Bay. Her crew was saved.

=== 15 November ===
List of shipwrecks: 15 November 1903
Ship	State	Description
Avarana	United States	The pleasure steamer was destroyed by fire at dock in Ogdensburg, New York. Fire reported as caused by embers from a passing locomotive.

=== 17 November ===
List of shipwrecks: 17 November 1903
Ship	State	Description
Minnesota	United States	The steamer burned in the St. Clair River and sank 1,500–2,000 feet (460–610 m) off the Grande Pointe Hotel pier of Grande Pointe, Michigan. Wreck removal was underway at end of year.
Return	United States	The steamer struck a hidden obstruction and sank in the Allegheny River, probably near Pittsburgh, Pennsylvania.

=== 18 November ===
List of shipwrecks: 18 November 1903
Ship	State	Description
Nellie	United States	The steamer was destroyed by fire at dock at Grants Ferry, Washington on the Columbia River.

=== 19 November ===
List of shipwrecks: 19 November 1903
Ship	State	Description
May Flower	United States	The steamer sank when ice gouged the caulking out of her seams between Warsaw, Illinois and Burlington, Iowa.

=== 20 November ===
List of shipwrecks: 20 November 1903
Ship	State	Description
Anna Catherine	United States	The 8-gross register ton, 30-foot (9.1 m) sloop was wrecked in Tongass Narrows in Southeast Alaska 0.5 nautical miles (0.9 km; 0.6 mi) south of Hollis, District of Alaska, during a storm.
Gladstone	United States	The steamer was sunk in a collision with Sacramento (United States) near the Detroit River Light in Lake Erie.

=== 21 November ===
List of shipwrecks: 21 November 1903
Ship	State	Description
Araby Maid	Norway	The bark was sunk in a collision with Denver 30 miles (48 km) north of the Dry Tortugas, Florida. The crew transferred to Denver. Two crewmen who were ill with a fever before the collision died shortly after coming aboard Denver.

=== 22 November ===
List of shipwrecks: 22 November 1903
Ship	State	Description
Saugerties	United States	The steamer burned to the waterline at dock in Saugerties, New York, a total loss. Some fittings salvaged. Refloated and scuttled in a cove north of the Saugerties Lighthouse. One crewman was killed trying to retrieve clothing after being ordered to abandon ship.

=== 26 November ===
List of shipwrecks: 26 November 1903
Ship	State	Description
S. C. Baldwin	United States	During a voyage from Green Bay, Wisconsin, to Buffalo, New York, with a cargo of lumber, the 160-foot (49 m), 356-gross register ton steam barge struck ice and sank off Wisconsin in Green Bay near Long Tail Point, 10 nautical miles (19 km; 12 mi) north of the entrance to the Fox River. By the beginning of April 1904, she had been refloated. She subsequently was converted into an unpowered barge and placed back in service.

=== 27 November ===
List of shipwrecks: 27 November 1903
Ship	State	Description
Alwina	Netherlands	The steamship passed Pointe Saint-Mathieu, Finistère, France, bound for Rotterdam, the Netherlands, then disappeared without trace.
Hustler	United States	The steamer was sunk in a collision with USS Yankton ( United States Navy) at Norfolk, Virginia.

=== 28 November ===
List of shipwrecks: 28 November 1903
Ship	State	Description
Coal City	United States	The steamer struck a snag in the Ohio River near Vanceburg, Kentucky and sank. Raised and repaired.
Petriana	United Kingdom	The oil tanker struck a reef east of Point Nepean, Victoria, Australia, at the entrance to Port Phillip Bay. Two days later its cargo of 1,300 tonnes of crude oil was released into the ocean, causing one of the first major maritime oil spills.

=== 29 November ===
List of shipwrecks: 29 November 1903
Ship	State	Description
George W. Moredock	United States	The steamer was destroyed by fire in the Ohio River at Neil's Landing, Pennsylvania.
Ishpeming	United States	Carrying a cargo of coal, the wooden schooner was driven ashore off the coast of Michigan on Black River Island in Lake Huron, where she broke up. Her wreck lies in 12 feet (3.7 m) of water at 44.809817°N 83.2775°W.

=== 30 November ===
List of shipwrecks: 30 November 1903
Ship	State	Description
Frank	United States	The tug sank at dock at New Berlin, Florida. Promptly raised.

=== Unknown date ===
List of shipwrecks: unknown November 1903
Ship	State	Description
Joe	United States	The steamer was wrecked one mile (1.6 km) south of Holland, Michigan on 26 September, or near Grand Haven, Michigan on 29 November.

== December ==
=== 1 December ===
List of shipwrecks: 1 December 1903
Ship	State	Description
Idlewild	United States	The tow steamer was sunk in a collision with Hercules (United States) in New York Bay. Three crewmen were killed, one injured.

=== 4 December ===
List of shipwrecks: 4 December 1903
Ship	State	Description
Embury	United States	The steamer was destroyed by fire at the Eldorado Dock, Grand Island, New York in the Niagara River.
Jessie Russell	United States	The tow steamer was sunk in a collision with a scow in the North River.

=== 5 December ===
List of shipwrecks: 4 December 1903
Ship	State	Description
J. Emory Owen	United States	The steamer caught fire four miles (6.4 km) off Manitowoc, Wisconsin. She was towed by three steamers to the Sturgeon Bay Ship Canal where the fire was extinguished, but she sank in 18 feet (5.5 m) of water. She was raised, rebuilt and returned to service as F. A. Meyer.

=== 6 December ===
List of shipwrecks: 6 December 1903
Ship	State	Description
Warrington	United Kingdom	The passenger-cargo ship was wrecked on the sands near Happisburgh on the coast of Norfolk, England.

=== 7 December ===
List of shipwrecks: 7 December 1903
Ship	State	Description
Ann & Betsey	United Kingdom	The smack got into difficulties off Cardigan. Her crew were rescued by Lizzie & Charles Leigh Clare ( Royal National Lifeboat Institution). They later returned to the smack and took her in to Cardigan.
Ella	United States	The passenger steamer was sunk by ice at dock in Athens, New York.

=== 9 December ===
List of shipwrecks: 9 December 1903
Ship	State	Description
Coptic	United Kingdom	The 107-foot (32.6 m) trawler was sunk in a collision in the North Sea, without loss of life.
Fordyce	United States	The steamer struck rocks in a snow storm and sank in the Mississippi River two miles (3.2 km) above Thebes, Illinois. Total loss.
Lucretia	United States	The motor vessel burned at Atlantic Wharf, Baltimore, Maryland.

=== 12 December ===
List of shipwrecks: 12 December 1903
Ship	State	Description
Al Martin	United States	The tow steamer struck a submerged obstruction in the Kentucky River near Sand Ripple and sank, a total loss.

=== 15 December ===
List of shipwrecks: 15 December 1903
Ship	State	Description
Mattie M.	United States	The steamer struck a hidden obstruction on the Mississippi River six miles (9.7 km) above Natchez, Mississippi and sank. Six crewmen killed.

=== 16 December ===
List of shipwrecks: 16 December 1903
Ship	State	Description
Alice M. Jacobs	United States	The steamer was wrecked in a gale and snowstorm at Duram Island off Newfoundland, a total loss.
Columbia	United States	The steam lighter was sunk in a collision with the ferry Kingston in the North River.

=== 18 December ===
List of shipwrecks: 18 December 1903
Ship	State	Description
Mary Buhne	United States	The schooner was sunk in a collision with Del Norte (United States) off Humboldt Bay, California. Everyone on board was rescued by boats from Del Norte, but one crewman from Del Norte died in the rescue.

=== 20 December ===
List of shipwrecks: 20 December 1903
Ship	State	Description
Ada V.	United States	The laid up steamer sank at dock when her bitts pulled out causing leaks at Newport, Kentucky. Raised and repaired.

=== 21 December ===
List of shipwrecks: 21 December 1903
Ship	State	Description
Champion	United Kingdom	The barque was wrecked at Outer Parajos, near Coquimbo.
Brugia	Belgium	The steamship was wrecked near Beadnell, United Kingdom.
Sophia	United States	The tug struck burned at Eagle Harbor, Washington.

=== 24 December ===
List of shipwrecks: 24 December 1903
Ship	State	Description
Erastus Corning	United States	The steamer struck a submerged object west south west of Stratford Point Light and was beached.

=== 25 December ===
List of shipwrecks: 25 December 1903
Ship	State	Description
Clarence S. Bement	United States	The sailing ship caught fire on 22 December and was abandoned on 24 or 25 December in Fox Bay, Falkland Islands, a total loss. The crew went to shore in her boats.
Mahngotaysee	none	The unfinished and unregistered steamer was totally destroyed by arson at dock at Boyd's Shipyard, Palatka, Florida.

=== 26 December ===
List of shipwrecks: 26 December 1903
Ship	State	Description
Kiowa	United States	While anchored off Hull, Massachusetts, about two nautical miles (3.7 km; 2.3 mi) south of Boston Light in a heavy snowstorm, the 2,953-gross register ton cargo ship was struck on her port side by the outgoing steamer Admiral Dewey (United States) at 11:20 a.m. The crew was saved by the nearby towboat Cormorant (United States), and Kiowa sank a few hours later 1 nautical mile (1.9 km; 1.2 mi) southeast of Boston Light at 42°19′19″N 070°51′52″W. After all attempts to raise the vessel failed, her wreck finally was blown up by 19 September 1904.

=== 27 December ===
List of shipwrecks: 27 December 1903
Ship	State	Description
Alert	United States	The steamer burned at Chase's Wharf, Baltimore, Maryland.
W. H. Grapevine	United States	The steamer was sunk by ice at dock at the foot of Vine Street, Cincinnati, Ohio.

=== 28 December ===
List of shipwrecks: 28 December 1903
Ship	State	Description
Pomona	United States	The steamer struck a snag near Careys Bend, Oregon on the Willamette River and sank.

=== 30 December ===
List of shipwrecks: 30 December 1903
Ship	State	Description
Peerless	United States	The steamer was sunk in six feet (1.8 m) of water by ice at St. Charles, Missouri. Scheduled to be raised in 1904.
Polar Wave	United States	The steamer was destroyed by fire over night at dock at Helena, Arkansas. Total loss.

=== 31 December ===
List of shipwrecks: 31 December 1903
Ship	State	Description
Burnside	United States	The steamer burned in the Cumberland River. One crewman killed.
El Sueno	United States	The 23-ton steamer sank off Nome, District of Alaska. She was declared a total loss.
USS Quiros	United States	The gunboat was reported to have gone aground on the Pearl Banks in the Sulu Sea off Borneo. She was reported on 15 January 1904 to have been refloated with minimal damage.

== Unknown date ==
List of shipwrecks: Unknown date 1903
Ship	State	Description
Aristides	United Kingdom	The clipper ship left Caleta Buena, Chile, for San Francisco on 28 May and was never seen again.
Delphine	United States	The launch was lost at Karluk, District of Alaska.
Edith	Germany	The full-rigged ship sprang a leak and was beached in the Solomon Islands, where she was wrecked. Her crew survived.
Fannie Kerr	United Kingdom	The barque was abandoned on 29 May 1902 after her cargo of coal caught fire near the Territory of Hawaii (20°00′N 169°00′W). She drifted ashore and was wrecked on South Cape, Formosa sometime in March–August, 1903.
Helen Brewer	United States	The sailing ship went missing after leaving Surabaya, Netherlands East Indies for Philadelphia on March 7.
Jane A. Falkenberg	United States	Abandoned at sea during a storm in 1899 and again during a later voyage while under tow in 1900, and recovered both times after suffering serious damage, the wrecked 310.63-gross register ton, 131-foot (39.9 m) barkentine was filled with stones and sand and scuttled in 6 feet (1.8 m) of water to form a breakwater at St. Michael, District of Alaska, sometime prior to 26 October.
Jennie	Unknown	The cannery steamer sank after running aground on Denman Island in the Gulf Islands in British Columbia.
Loch Bredan	United Kingdom	The barque disappeared without trace after departing Adelaide, South Australia, in September 1903.
Nor'West	United States	While laid up for the winter, the 8-gross register ton, 35.4-foot (10.8 m) schooner dragged her anchor during either the winter of 1901–1902 or the winter of 1902–1903 and was blown so far inland at the head of "Wrangell Bay" in the District of Alaska – probably Wrangell Bay (57°01′N 156°31′W) on Kodiak Island but possibly the harbor at Wrangell in Southeast Alaska – that she could not be relaunched. She was declared a total loss and was stripped and abandoned.
Samuel N. Lapsley		The Presbyterian missionary riverboat, built by William R. Trigg Co., Richmond, Virginia in 1901 and assembled in the Congo, capsized in the Congo River during a supply run between Leopoldville and Luebo Station with loss of twenty-four people. The vessel was replaced by Samuel N. Lapsley II in 1906.
Thomas	United States	The 167-gross register ton barge sank off Velasco, Texas. Both people on board survived.
Vega	United Kingdom	The barque sank in Melville Bay, Greenland
