= Whale Cove =

Whale Cove can refer to:

- Whale Cove, Newfoundland and Labrador
- Whale Cove, Nunavut
- Whale Cove (Oregon), south of Depoe Bay, Oregon
