= Harbin Institute of Technology Museum =

Museum in Harbin, China

Coordinates: 45°44′58″N 126°37′57″E

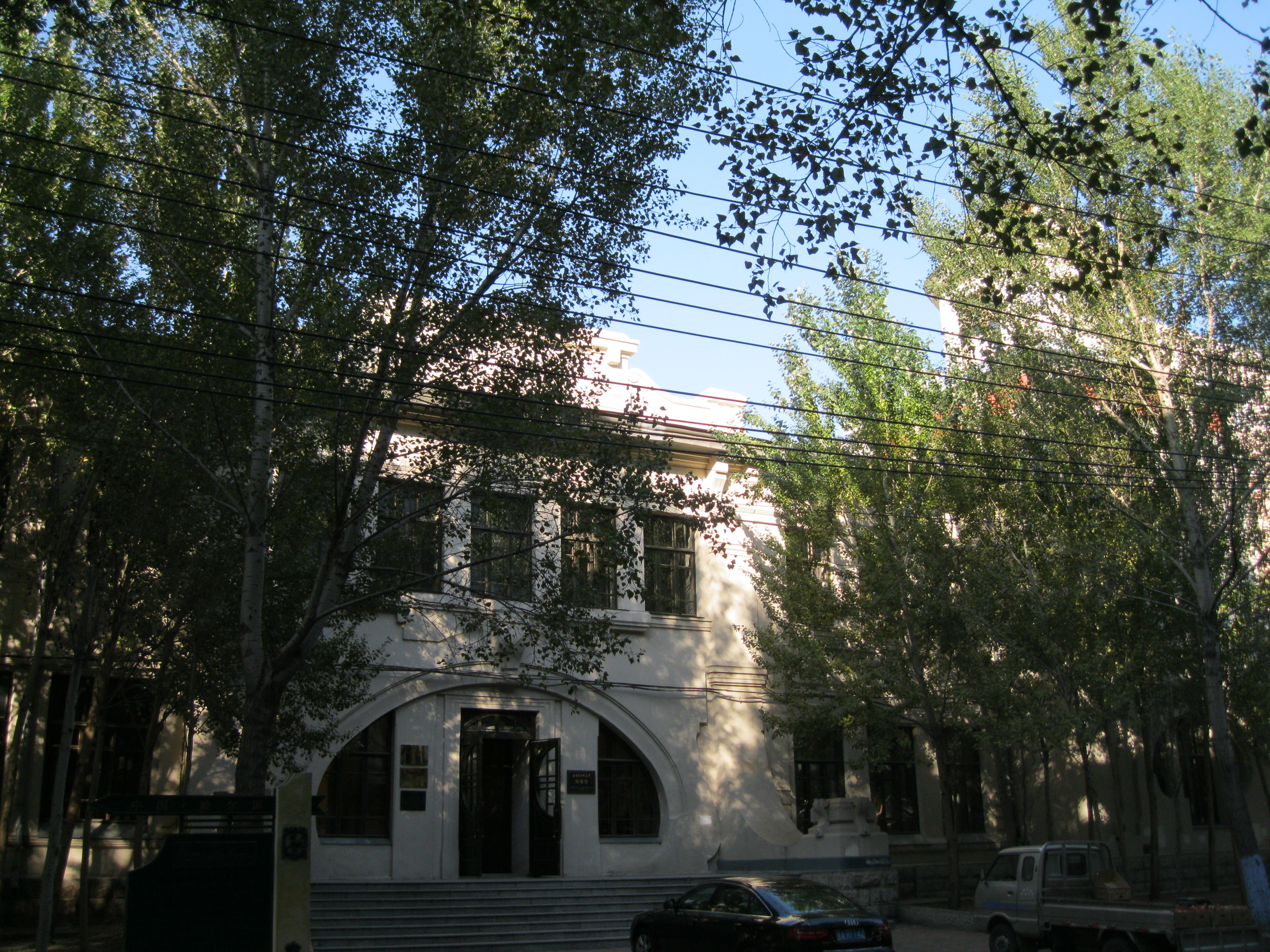
Harbin Institute of Technology Museum

Harbin Institute of Technology Museum (Chinese: 哈尔滨工业大学博物馆; pinyin: Hā'ěrbīn Gōngyè Dàxué Bówùguǎn) on 59 Gongsi Street, Harbin, China is the official museum of Harbin Institute of Technology. The present building was the building of General Consulate of Russian Federation in Harbin from 1906, and was transformed into classroom building of Harbin Institute of Technology in 1920. The museum was established in May 2010.

== Galleries ==
- Historical Exhibition Hall: The exhibition illustrates the history of HIT and its cultural traditions.
- Thematical Exhibition Hall: The specified exhibition focuses on alumni, major research achievements of the university.

Multiple languages of guided tour are provided, including Mandarin, English, Russian, Japanese and Korean.
