= Wenhu =

Wenhu may refer to:

- Wenhu line, a metro line of the Taipei Metro.
- Aw Boon-Haw (胡文虎; Hu Wenhu), a Chinese entrepreneur and philanthropist (1882–1954).
- Huang Wenhu (1926–2022), a Chinese engineer and university administrator
