= Wang Zicai =

Chinese engineer (1932–2023)

- 王子才
- Born: 23 June 1932; Liaocheng County, Shandong, China
- Died: 13 December 2023 (aged 91); Harbin, Heilongjiang, China
- Education: Harbin Institute of Technology
- Scientific career
- Fields: Automatic control and system simulation
- Workplaces: Harbin Institute of Technology

Wang Zicai (Chinese: 王子才; pinyin: Wáng Zǐcái; 23 June 1932 – 13 December 2023) was a Chinese automatic control and system simulation engineer, and an academician of the Chinese Academy of Engineering.

== Biography ==
Wang was born into a family of farming background in Liaocheng County (now Liaocheng), Shandong, on 23 June 1932. His studies was interrupted by the Second Sino-Japanese War. In order to survive, his family discussed and decided to move north, and settled down in northeast China.

In 1951, he was accepted to Harbin Institute of Technology, and worked at the institute after graduation. In 1987, he led a group of young students to establish the Control and Simulation Center of Harbin Institute of Technology, in which he served as its director between January 1990 and January 2002.

On 13 December 2023, he died from an illness in Harbin, Heilongjiang, at the age of 91.

== Honours and awards ==
- 1998 State Science and Technology Progress Award (Third Class) for the distributed simulation technology for large and complex systems
- 2000 State Science and Technology Progress Award (Second Class) for the electric simulation testing turntable system technology
- 2001 Member of the Chinese Academy of Engineering (CAE)
