= Cao Xibin =

Chinese engineer and professor

- Born: February 1963 (age 63); Zhaodong, Heilongjiang, China
- Education: Harbin Institute of Technology
- Scientific career
- Fields: Spacecraft
- Workplaces: Harbin Institute of Technology

Chinese name
- Traditional Chinese: 曹喜濱
- Simplified Chinese: 曹喜滨
Transcriptions
Standard Mandarin
- Hanyu Pinyin: Cáo Xǐbīn

Cao Xibin (Chinese: 曹喜滨; born February 1963) is a Chinese engineer and professor and doctoral supervisor at Harbin Institute of Technology.

== Biography ==
Cao was born in Zhaodong, Heilongjiang, in February 1963. He earned a bachelor's degree in 1985, a master's degree in 1988, and a doctor's degree in 1991, all from Harbin Institute of Technology. In October 1991 he pursued advanced studies in Russia, where he graduated from Samara National Research University.

After graduating from Harbin Institute of Technology, Cao taught at the university, where he was dean of the School of Astronautics in June 2009 and its vice-president in February 2019.

== Honours and awards ==
- November 22, 2019 Member of the Chinese Academy of Engineering (CAE)
