= April 1903 =

Month in 1903

<<	April 1903					>>
Su	Mo	Tu	We	Th	Fr	Sa
			1	2	3	4
5	6	7	8	9	10	11
12	13	14	15	16	17	18
19	20	21	22	23	24	25
26	27	28	29	30

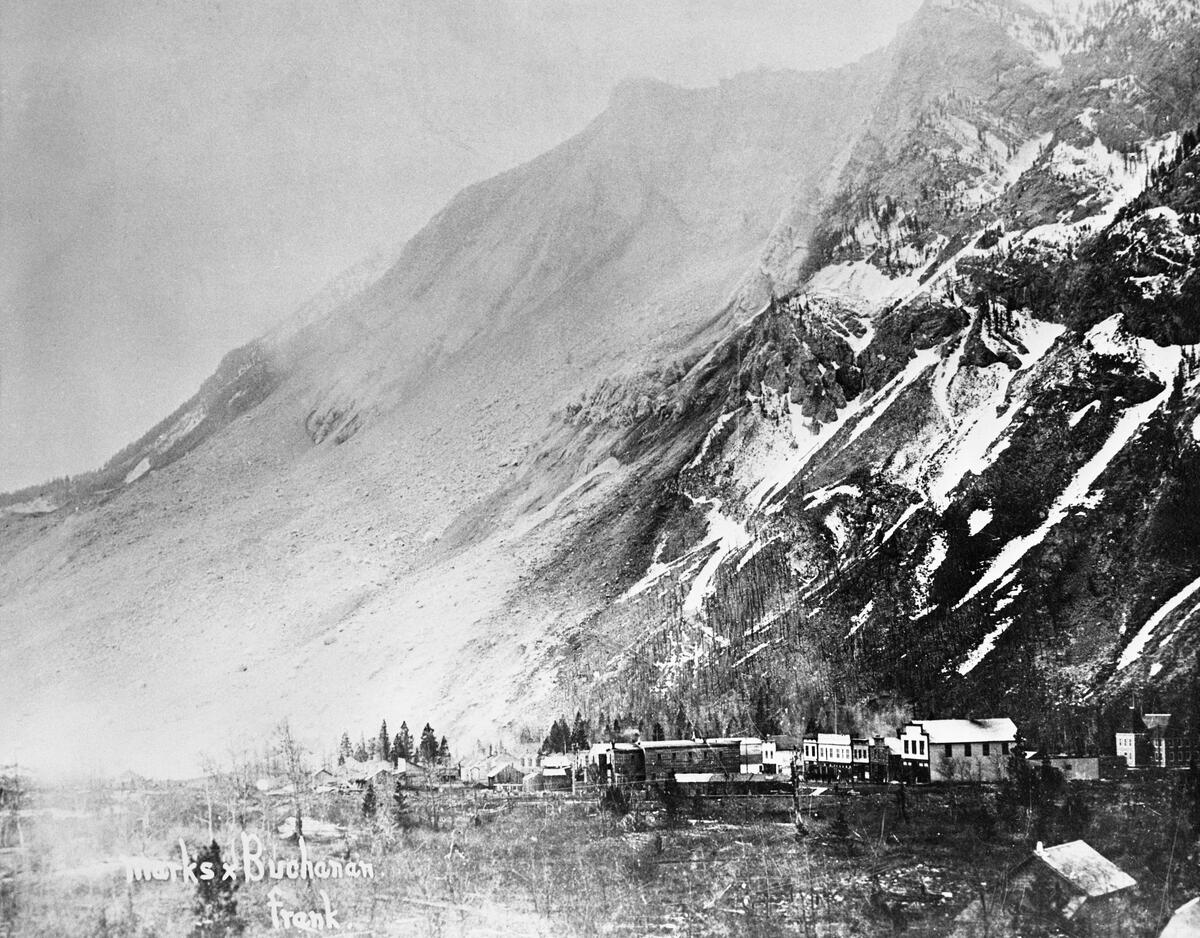
April 30, 1903: The town of Frank, North-West Territories, the day after the Frank Slide

The following events occurred in April 1903:

== April 1, 1903 (Wednesday) ==
- The Midwives Act 1902 came into effect in the UK, requiring midwives to be certified and penalizing any woman practising midwifery without certification.
- George Wyndham, the United Kingdom's Chief Secretary for Ireland introduced the government's proposed bill in the House of Commons to appropriate $975,000 per year for Ireland.
- U.S. President Theodore Roosevelt departed from Washington DC on his annual trip to the western 45 states, traveling to Wisconsin (April 3), Minnesota (April 5), Wyoming (April 8)
- The new minimum wage law in the U.S. state of Indiana was declared unconstitutional by the state's supreme court. On April 8, the Court declared the weekly-payment law to be unconstitutional.
- Cambridge University defeated Oxford in their annual boat race on the river Thames, winning by six lengths.
- Died: Elliott Zborowski (born William Elliott Morris Zborowski), American racing driver, race crash (b. 1856)

== April 2, 1903 (Thursday) ==
- Composer Pietro Mascagni left New York City after completing a tour of the United States.

== April 3, 1903 (Friday) ==
- The 7.92x57mm Mauser bullet, also known as the Spitzgeschoss, was approved for mass production by the German Empire adopting it for its standard for military use.
- Born:
  - Kamaladevi Chattopadhyay, Indian social reformer and freedom fighter, in Mangalore, Mysore state (now Mangaluru, Karnataka state) (died 1988)
  - Yarlagadda Sivarama Prasad, Indian Raja of Challapalli, aristocrat, banker, industrialist and film studio owner; in Challapalli, Madras Presidency, British India (now in Andhra Pradesh state.(d.1976)
  - Peter Huchel, German poet, in Lichterfelde, under the name Hellmut Huchel (died 1981)

== April 4, 1903 (Saturday) ==
- In the UK, the Welshpool and Llanfair Light Railway and the Wrexham and District Electric Tramways both became operational.
- Democrat John Nelson Hinkle was defeated by Republican Robert H. Jeffrey in the election for Mayor of Columbus, Ohio.
- Scotland defeated England in the final match of the British Home Championship football tournament, resulting in a three-way tie for first place in the competition.

== April 5, 1903 (Sunday) ==
- French composer Gabriel Fauré was invested as an officer of the Légion d'honneur.

== April 6, 1903 (Monday) ==
- A general strike began in the Netherlands on the kingdom's transportation system on rail and by ship, in reaction to proposed restrictions on labor. The Staats-General approved anti-strike bill two days later and railway workers returned to the job.

== April 7, 1903 (Tuesday) ==
- King Alexander of Serbia suspended the nation's constitution and declared his intention to implement new laws by decree until they could be approved.
- Voters in the U.S. state of Kansas overwhelmingly approved prohibition of the sale of alcohol.
- Died: George Chapman, 37, Polish-born serial killer known as "The Borough Poisoner", executedby hanging at Wandsworth Prison, London, UK

== April 8, 1903 (Wednesday) ==
- At the Camborne by-election in the UK, caused by the death of sitting Liberal MP William Sproston Caine, 74-year-old Wilfrid Lawson retained the seat for the Liberals.
- American coal baron and philanthropist Andrew Carnegie offered the city of Cleveland, Ohio a donation of $250,000 to establish seven branch libraries, on condition that the city provide the work sites and agree to an annual appropriation of $25,000 per year to support the libraries.
- 1903 Copa del Rey Final: Athletic Bilbao defeated Madrid CF 3-2 at the Estadio del Hipódromo in Madrid, to win Spain's football cup.
- An explosion on the battleship USS Iowa killed three men during target practice exercises on the Gulf of Mexico.

== April 9, 1903 (Thursday) ==
- William Propsting became Premier of Tasmania.
- Three men were killed when a 12-inch (305 mm) gun in the forward turret of the battleship USS Iowa (BB-4) shattered during firing practice.
- A federal appellate court in St. Paul, Minnesota, declared that the Northern Securities Company was an illegal combination of businesses in restraint of trade, in violation of U.S. antitrust law, and issued an injunction prohibiting it from controlling the Northern Pacific Railroad and the Great Northern Railroad company.

== April 10, 1903 (Friday) ==
- U.S. tycoon Joseph Pulitzer donated $2 million to Columbia University, to found a school of journalism, also making allowance for literary prizes.
- In the Philippines, U.S. Army Captain John J. Pershing led his men on the capture of the rebel fortress at Bacalod, killing 100 Moro rebels.

== April 11, 1903 (Saturday) ==
- Hippolyte Aucouturier won the 8th Paris–Roubaix cycle race.
- Died: Gemma Galgani, 25, Italian mystic and Catholic saint (tuberculosis)

== April 12, 1903 (Sunday) ==
- The wreckage of the Spanish Navy ship Reina Christina, flagship of Admiral Montojo, was raised from Manila Bay, after having been sunk in the Spanish-American War in 1898. The skeletal remains of 80 of his crew were found in the hull.
- A partial lunar eclipse took place.
- Born: Jan Tinbergen, Dutch economist and Nobel laureate, in The Hague (died 1994)

== April 13, 1903 (Monday) ==
- U.S. Postmaster General Henry Clay Payne announced a thorough investigation of scandals within the Department.
- Died: Moritz Lazarus, 78, German philosopher

== April 14, 1903 (Tuesday) ==
- Aberdeen Football Club was founded, in Scotland.
- Two workers were killed and two injured by a delayed explosion of dynamite during construction of the Mount Washington Transit Tunnel in Pittsburgh, Pennsylvania.

== April 15, 1903 (Wednesday) ==
- The salon of the National Society of Fine Arts was opened in Paris.
- New rules went into effect in the U.S. Civil Service system, extending the rules on classified service.
- President Loubet of France arrived in Algiers, capital of France's overseas territory of Algeria.

== April 16, 1903 (Thursday) ==
- The Irish Nationalist convention met at Dublin and approved the principle of Britain's proposed land bill.

== April 17, 1903 (Friday) ==
- A cold snap with freezing temperatures struck England and France.

== April 18, 1903 (Saturday) ==
- In the UK, the 1903 FA Cup Final was won by Bury F.C., who defeated Derby County F.C. 6-0 at Crystal Palace.

== April 19, 1903 (Sunday) ==
- The first of the Kishinev pogroms took place in Kishinev, capital of the Bessarabia Governorate of the Russian Empire. At least 47 Jews were killed and a further 92 were seriously injured during two days of rioting, led by priests and encouraged by the press.
- Born: Eliot Ness, US law enforcement agent, in Chicago (died 1957, heart attack)

== April 20, 1903 (Monday) ==
- In the U.S., the Reading Coal and Iron Company announced the lockout of employees and two-thirds of its mines after the miners refused an order to work for nine hours on Saturday in addition to the 50 hours worked Monday through Friday.
- John Aitken was elected unopposed as Mayor of Wellington, New Zealand.

== April 21, 1903 (Tuesday) ==
- The Kishinev pogrom ended after three days in Russia.
- The United Mine Workers labor union ordered its members to return to work at the Reading Coal and Iron Company pending adjustments of grievances by a board of labor and management.
- With the reassembly of the House of Commons and the House of Lords, the British government published the proposed international convention for construction of the Baghdad Railway.
- The Spanish government ordered the customs officials of the Sultanate of Morocco to leave Melilla.
- The Norwegian steamer Freia was wrecked near Scharhörn during a passage from Kristiania to Harlingen, Friesland, Netherlands.

== April 22, 1903 (Wednesday) ==
- President Horacio Vásquez of the Dominican Republic was overthrown by revolutionaries in Santo Domingo, who installed former President Alejandro Woss y Gil to take his place.
- Germany outlawed the use of phosphorus in the manufacture of matchsticks because of the occupational diseases developed by match factory employees.
- The New York Stock Exchange opened its new building in Broad Street, New York City, United States.

== April 23, 1903 (Thursday) ==
- The UK's Chancellor of the Exchequer, Charles Thomson Ritchie, announced the repeal of Corn Duty, to come into force on 1 July 1903. The announcement came in conjunction with the presentation in the House of Commons of the annual budget. Ritchie also announced that Britain would not participate in the construction of the Baghdad Railway.
- The British Army announced the loss of 100 officers and men who were killed in Somalia in a battle with the followers of "the Mad Mullah", the Somali resistance leader.
- Andrew Carnegie announced a donation of $600,000 for the endowment of the Tuskegee Institute for university education for African-Americans in Alabama.

== April 24, 1903 (Friday) ==
- British Colonial Secretary Joseph Chamberlain, sympathetic to the Zionist cause of creating an independent Jewish homeland, proposed the British Uganda Programme to Zionist leader Theodor Herzl. Under the proposal, Jewish refugees from prosecution would be given transport to British East Africa in what is now the African Republic of Uganda.
- Born: José Antonio Primo de Rivera, Spanish politician, in Madrid (died 1936)

== April 25, 1903 (Saturday) ==
- Britain declared its victory over the Mad Mullah's forces in Somalia.
- Andrew Carnegie donated $1.5 million for the building of the new headquarters for the Hague Court of Arbitration at The Hague in the Netherlands.
- In the UK, the final of the rugby league Challenge Cup took place at Headingley Stadium in Leeds, and was won by Halifax, who defeated Salford 7-0.
- Born: Andrey Kolmogorov, Russian mathematician, in Tambov (died 1987)

== April 26, 1903 (Sunday) ==
- The Spanish football club Atlético Madrid was officially founded.
- The first round of voting took place in the Spanish general election.
- The 12th season of league football in Argentina began, with six teams competing.

== April 27, 1903 (Monday) ==
- The Jamaica Race Course opened in Jamaica, Queens, New York City, United States. The Excelsior Handicap was run for the first time as part of the opening celebrations.
- King Edward VII of Britain arrived in Italy as the guest of King Victor Emmanuel III.

== April 28, 1903 (Tuesday) ==
- A 7.0 magnitude earthquake killed more than 3,500 people when it struck Manzikert in eastern Turkey. Approximately 3,500 people and 20,000 animals were killed.

== April 29, 1903 (Wednesday) ==
- At least 70 people were killed in a rockslide that buried the mining town of Frank in Canada's North-West Territories, caused by limestone breaking off the summit of Turtle Mountain.

== April 30, 1903 (Thursday) ==
- The Louisiana Purchase Exposition opened at St. Louis, Missouri with addresses by U.S. President Roosevelt and former President Grover Cleveland.
- The Ottoman Bank building at Salonika was destroyed by a dynamite explosion.
