= March 1903 =

Month in 1903

<<	March 1903					>>
Su	Mo	Tu	We	Th	Fr	Sa
1	2	3	4	5	6	7
8	9	10	11	12	13	14
15	16	17	18	19	20	21
22	23	24	25	26	27	28
29	30	31

The following events occurred in March 1903:

== March 1, 1903 (Sunday) ==
- José Batlle y Ordóñez began a four-year term as President of Uruguay, succeeding Juan Lindolfo Cuestas.
- Henri Bourassa and Olivar Asselin founded the Ligue nationaliste canadienne in Quebec, Canada.
- Hugh Guthrie Leighton, an electrical engineering student at the Armour Institute and former college football player at the University of Chicago, died of dilation of the heart at his father's home in Chicago. His health had never recovered after he collapsed following a Thanksgiving 1902 football game.

== March 2, 1903 (Monday) ==
- General Pedro José Escalón began a four-year term as the new President of El Salvador, succeeding General Tomas Regalado.

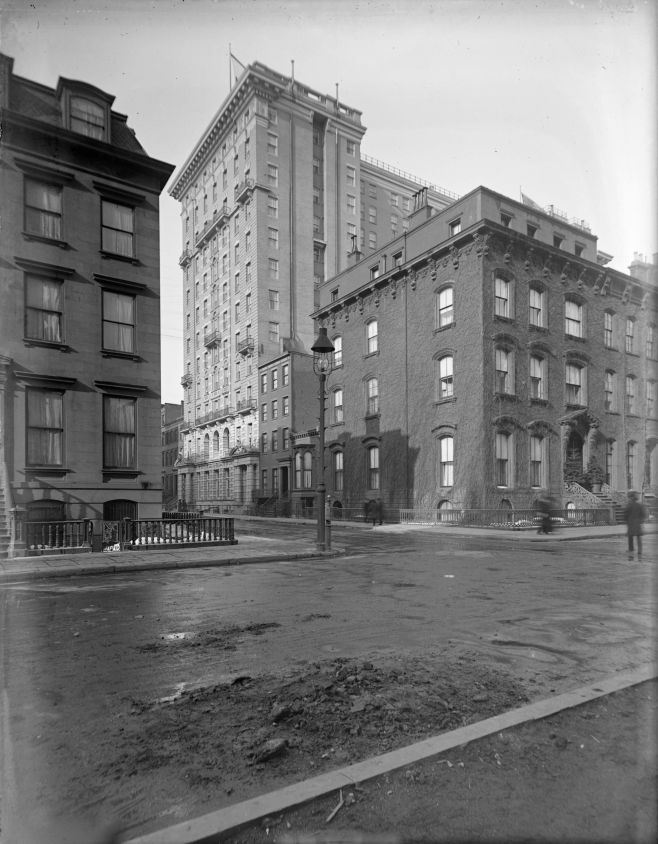
February 1903: The Martha Washington Hotel shortly before opening

- In New York City, the Martha Washington Hotel, the first hotel exclusively for women, opened at 29 East 29th Street in Manhattan.

== March 3, 1903 (Tuesday) ==
- The British Admiralty announced plans to build a naval base at Rosyth, in the Firth of Forth.
- The Baker valve gear for steam locomotives was patented for the first time, in the United States.
- The U.S. and Great Britain exchanged ratifications for their treaty to settle the U.S.-Canadian boundary between Alaska and British Columbia.

== March 4, 1903 (Wednesday) ==
- Elections were held in Japan for its parliament, the Diet, with the party of the Marquis Ito retaining its majority of 183 seats.
- The 58th United States Congress assembled in Washington, D.C.
- The French Chamber of Deputies voted to authorize $200,000 to increase the old age pensions paid by mining companies to their retired employees.
- Beşiktaş J.K. football club was formed in modern-day Turkey.
- Born: Dorothy Mackaill, British-born US actress, in Sculcoates (died 1990)

== March 5, 1903 (Thursday) ==
- The Ottoman Empire and the German Empire signed an agreement to build the Constantinople–Baghdad Railway.
- Died: Gaston Paris, 63, French writer and Nobel Prize nominee

== March 6, 1903 (Friday) ==
- General Manuel Bonilla, claimant to the presidency of the Honduras, led his men in the capture of the town of La Ceiba and its fortress.

== March 7, 1903 (Saturday) ==
- In Washington, Belgium signed an agreement with Venezuela for Venezuelan reparations to settle claims by Belgian citizens.

== March 8, 1903 (Sunday) ==
- The funeral of Charles Gavan Duffy, former Premier of Victoria, took place at Glasnevin Cemetery in Dublin.

== March 9, 1903 (Monday) ==
- Elizabeth Milbank Anderson was identified as the donor of $1,000,000 to Barnard College, a women's college in New York, United States.

== March 10, 1903 (Tuesday) ==
- The Parliament of Newfoundland renewed its agreement with France on the use of Newfoundland shores.
- Born: Bix Beiderbecke, jazz musician (died 1931), in Davenport, Iowa

== March 11, 1903 (Wednesday) ==
- By a vote of only 154 in favor and 245 against, the British House of Commons rejected a proposal to reduce the British Army by 27,000 men as a means to reduce the projected expense of 34.5 million pounds sterling ($172.5 million U.S. dollars) budgeted by the government.
- The Cuban Senate voted, 16 to 5, to ratify its reciprocity treaty with the United States.
- Bolivia's ambassador to the U.S. protested against the transfer to Brazil of the concession previously granted in Acre to a British-American corporation.
- Born: Ronald Syme, New Zealand classical scholar and historian, in Eltham (died 1989)

== March 12, 1903 (Thursday) ==
- Tsar Nicholas II of Russia issued a manifesto granting freedom of worship to his subjects and recognizing the right of local self-government for Russian villages.
- Canada's Parliament opened for its new session.

== March 13, 1903 (Friday) ==
- Having abolished the Sokoto Caliphate in West Africa, the new British administration accepted the concession of the last Vizier of the Caliphate and appointed Muhammadu Attahiru II as the new Caliph.

== March 14, 1903 (Saturday) ==
- The United States Senate ratified the Hay–Herrán Treaty, granting the United States the right to build the Panama Canal. The Colombian Senate later rejected the treaty.
- A commission, to be chaired by the Minister Piebwe, was appointed in Russia to carry out the Tsar's March 12 manifesto.
- Born:
  - Mustafa Barzani, Kurdish military leader, in Barzan, Iraq (died 1979)
  - Adolph Gottlieb, US abstract expressionist painter, sculptor and printmaker, in New York City (died 1974)

== March 15, 1903 (Sunday) ==
- Voters in Switzerland approved a protective tariff in a nationwide referendum.

== March 16, 1903 (Monday) ==
- The newly-created U.S. Department of Commerce and Labor began operations with George B. Cortelyou as its Secretary.
- Born: Mike Mansfield, American Senator for Montana, U.S. Senate Majority Leader from 1961 to 1977 and U.S. Ambassador to Japan from 1977 to 1988; in New York City(d. 2001)
- Died: Roy Bean, 77, American judge and saloon order who called himself "The Only Law West of the Pecos" in trying cases in Val Verde County, Texas

== March 17, 1903 (Tuesday) ==
- Venezuela paid the first installment of its reparation indemnity to Germany, providing the payment to the German minister.
- Colombia's increase in import duties went into effect.
- Born: Elli Stenberg, Finnish politician (d. 1987)

== March 18, 1903 (Wednesday) ==
- The Anthracite Coal Strike Commission submitted its investigative report to U.S. President Roosevelt.
- France's Chamber of Deputies approved, by a vote of 300 to 257, the government's refusal to permit male congreations to teach in France.
- Born: Galeazzo Ciano, Italian politician, in Livorno (died 1944)

== March 19, 1903 (Thursday) ==
- Negotiations between the United States and Britain began for a new parcels post convention.
- Died: Pista Dankó, 44, Hungarian Romani bandleader and composer (lung disease)

== March 20, 1903 (Friday) ==
- At New Orleans, the Mississippi River reached its greatest recorded height, 19.8 feet (6.0 m).
- Died: Charles Godfrey Leland, 78, US humorist, writer, and folklorist

== March 21, 1903 (Saturday) ==
- President Cipriano Castro of Venezuela resigned.
- Director Stueble of the German Colonial Office informed Germany's Reichstag that household slavery had been abolished in German West Africa (now Namibia)
- Bolivia signed an agreement with Brazil to permit the assignment of the concession for territory in Acre.
- Three members of the cabinet of Colombia, including its chief minister, resigned.

== March 22, 1903 (Sunday) ==
The Ladrones Philippine militia captured the town of Surigan at Mindanao and killed several people, including the local constable.

== March 23, 1903 (Monday) ==
- The Wright brothers filed an application for a patent for the design of their Glider No. 3.
- Revolutions broke out in Nicaragua in the cities of San Domingo and Managua.
- A mob in Port of Spain, the capital of the Trinidad, attacked government buildings and was fired on by police.

== March 24, 1903 (Tuesday) ==
- France's Chamber of Deputies voted, 304 to 246 to prohibit religious preaching orders.
- The National Packing Company was incorporated in Chicago.
- A mild earthquake was felt in the midland counties of England.
- The Canadian government signed an agreement with the Allan Steamship Line for service by the fastest transatlantic steamer service up to that time from Britain.
- Born: Frank Sargeson, New Zealand writer, in Hamilton, as Norris Frank Davey (died 1982)

== March 25, 1903 (Wednesday) ==
- The Alaska boundary dispute was decided by arbitration, in favour of the United States.
- The Irish Land Bill was introduced in the British House of Commons by Chief Secretary for Ireland Wyndham.
- The football club Racing Club de Avellaneda was founded in Buenos Aires, Argentina.
- The U.S. Navy canceled its plan for a scheduled cruise of battleships to Europe, and declined to accept Kaiser Wilhelm II's invitation for the squadron to visit Kiel.

== March 26, 1903 (Thursday) ==
- France's Chamber of Deputies voted, 338 to 231 to prohibit a group of Carthusian monks from entering the nation.

== March 27, 1903 (Friday) ==
- The Prime Minister of Bulgaria resigned with his entire cabinet.
- The Macabele scouts in the Rizal Province of the Philippine Islands killed 45 Filipino insurgents.

== March 28, 1903 (Saturday) ==
- The statue of the late British Prime Minister William E. Gladstone was placed in Westminster Abbey.
- A lockout at the cotton mills of Lowell, Massachusetts put 20,000 textile workers out of jobs.
- The Cuban Senate voted to adopt the reciprocity treaty with the U.S., as amended by the U.S. Senate.

== March 29, 1903 (Sunday) ==
- Four children were killed, and eight injured, in the explosion of a defective bomb at the British Army's Fort Delimara at Malta.
- Died: Gustavus F. Swift, 63, American multimillionaire entrepreneur who founded the Swift Packing Company, the largest meatpacking company in the United States.

== March 30, 1903 (Monday) ==
- Greece's Minister of War resigned.

== March 31, 1903 (Tuesday) ==
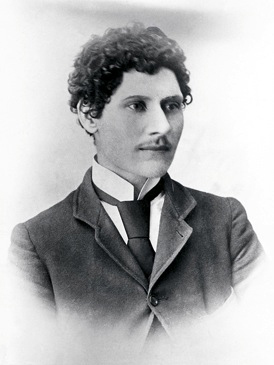
Richard Pearse in 1903

- New Zealand inventor Richard Pearse reportedly made a short, uncontrolled flight in a powered heavier-than-air machine.
- Ratifications of the U.S.-Cuba reciprocity treaty were exchanged in Washington and Havana.
