= SS Victoria =

SS Victoria may refer to the following ships:

- SS Victoria (1870), a coastal passenger liner operated by the Alaska Steamship Company
- SS Victoria (1896), a passenger vessel built for the London and South Western Railway
- SS Victoria (1902), a passenger vessel built for the Pacific Steam Navigation Company
- SS Victoria (1907), a Cross-Channel and Isle of Man ferry
- SS Victoria (1944), a World War II Liberty ship that was later renamed Dominator. Shipwrecked off the coast of Los Angeles, California
