= Huang Wenhu =

Chinese engineer (1926–2022)

- 黄文虎

President of Harbin Institute of Technology
- In office 1983–1985
- Preceded by: Liu Deben
- Succeeded by: Yang Shiqin

Personal details
- Born: 22 July 1926 Shanghai, China
- Died: May 19, 2022 (aged 95) Harbin, Heilongjiang, China
- Party: Chinese Communist Party
- Education: Zhejiang University; Harbin Institute of Technology
- Scientific career
- Fields: Machinery dynamics
- Workplaces: Harbin Institute of Technology

Chinese name
- Simplified Chinese: 黄文虎
- Traditional Chinese: 黃文虎
Transcriptions
Standard Mandarin
- Hanyu Pinyin: Huáng Wénhǔ

Huang Wenhu (Chinese: 黄文虎; 22 July 1926 – 19 May 2022) was a Chinese engineer and university administrator who served as president of Harbin Institute of Technology from 1983 to 1985. He was an academician of the Chinese Academy of Engineering.

== Biography ==
Huang was born in Shanghai, on 22 July 1926, while his ancestral home is in Yongkang, Zhejiang. He was the eldest of six children. His parents named him "Wenhu" due to his Chinese zodiac belonged to the "tiger" (虎; hu; 'Tiger'). He was brought up by his grandparents in Zhoushan (舟山镇) of Yongkang. In 1945, he entered Zhejiang University, where he majored in electrical engineering. He also received his master's degree from Harbin Institute of Technology.

After graduating in May 1949, Huang worked in the Hangzhou Military Control Commission Finance Department and then the Tianjin Central Electrician No. 2 Factory. He joined the Chinese Communist Party (CCP) in May 1995. Starting in 1950, he was made a deputy director. He moved up the ranks to become director of Academic Committee of Harbin University of Technology in January 1981 and president in May 1981. He was dean of the Graduate School of Harbin Institute of Technology in September 1984 and subsequently director of the Vibration Engineering Research Center of Harbin University of Technology in January 1989.

On 19 May 2022, Huang died from an illness in Harbin, Heilongjiang, at the age of 96.

== Honours and awards ==
- 1995 Member of the Chinese Academy of Engineering (CAE)

Educational offices
Preceded by Liu Deben	President of Harbin Institute of Technology; 1983–1985	Succeeded by Yang Shiqin
