= Guggenheim Treasure =

1903 shipwreck off Staten Island, New York

Coordinates: 40.55°N 74.24°W

The Guggenheim Treasure was lost on September 26, 1903. The barge Harold moved out of dock at the South Street Seaport in New York City with 7,700 silver and lead ingots, bound for American Smelting and Refining Company in Perth Amboy, New Jersey. The silver and the smelters belonged to the Guggenheim family. The barge sank off Staten Island, and was never recovered.
