= SS Victoria (1896) =

Passenger vessel built for the London and South Western Railway

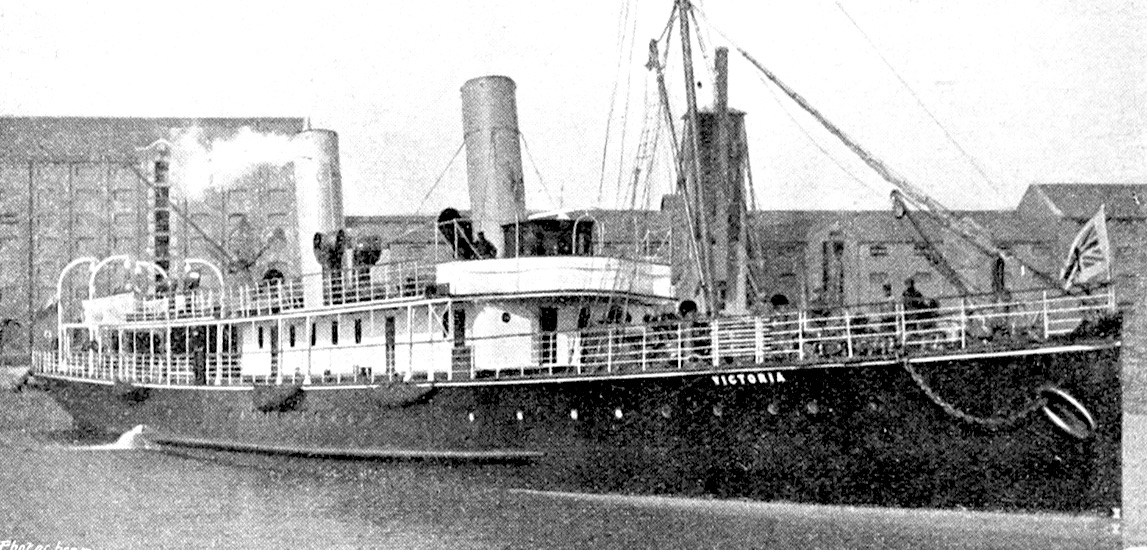
- Victoria being used as a tender for landing passengers from American liners at Devonport, Plymouth in 1904

History
- Name: SS Victoria
- Operator: 1896–1920: London and South Western Railway; 1920–1925: James Dredging, Towage and Transport, Southampton; 1925–1927: Joseph Constant, London; 1927–1935: The Patriotic, Cie de Navigation a Vapeur et d’Armement, Piraeus; 1935–1937: L Taryazos, Piraeus
- Port of registry: (United Kingdom)
- Builder: J and G Thomson, Clydebank
- Yard number: 297
- Launched: 15 June 1896
- Out of service: 1937
- Fate: Scrapped 1935

General characteristics
- Tonnage: 710 gross register tons (GRT)
- Length: 220.5 feet (67.2 m)
- Beam: 28.1 feet (8.6 m)
- Draught: 16.3 feet (5.0 m)
- Installed power: 3 cylinder triple expansion engines
- Propulsion: twin screw
- Speed: 16.5 kn (19.0 mph; 30.6 km/h)
- Capacity: 533 passengers (as a Plymouth tender in 1904)

SS Victoria was a passenger vessel built for the London and South Western Railway in 1896.

== History ==
The ship was built by J and G Thomson of Clydebank and launched on 15 June 1896 by Miss Dunlop of Dowanhill. She was intended for the railway company's service between Southampton and the Channel Islands and France.

In 1904, she was adapted at Southampton for service as a tender in Plymouth to serve the new Ocean Quay station.

At the outbreak of the First World War she was requisitioned by the Admiralty as a Q-ship. She was an accommodation vessel in Southampton in 1920 and sold to James Dredging, Towage and Transport in Southampton. In 1925 she was sold to Joseph Constant in London who sold her again in 1927 to Cie de Navigation a Vapeur et d’Armement in Piraeus. After a further sale in 1935 she was scrapped in 1935.
