= Chen Guangxi =

Chinese engineer, computer scientist, and professor

- 陈光熙
- Born: 1903; Tongcheng, Anhui, China
- Died: 1992 (aged 88–89); Harbin, China

Chen Guangxi (Chinese: 陈光熙; 1903–1992) was a Chinese engineer, computer scientist, and professor who founded the discipline of computer science at the Harbin Institute of Technology.

== Early life ==
Chen Guangxi was born in Tongcheng, Anhui Province, on May 21, 1903, with his ancestral hometown in Shangyu, Zhejiang. His father was a former Qing dynasty government official.

In May 1920, Chen left China to study and work in France. In 1922, Chen graduated as an agricultural machinery student and obtained a degree in agricultural mechanics. In 1929, he graduated from the School of Engineering of the University of Leuven, Belgium with degrees in Process Manufacturing, Civil Engineering and Mining Engineering. In 1930 he graduated from the Graduate School of Geology and obtained a degree in engineering geology.

Chen returned to war-torn China in October 1930. He found a faculty place to teach mathematics in a middle school in Beijing after one year of unemployment. He successively worked as a lecturer at National Labour University, a course interpreter in the Chinese Northeast Navy in Qingdao, a physics and chemistry teacher in Kaifeng and a math teacher in Beijing Fu Jen Catholic University high school successively. In September 1933, he worked as a lecturer in the Department of Mathematics and Physics at Fu Jen Catholic University. In September 1938, he was promoted to professor by Fu Jen.

In 1945, at the end of the Second World War, Ministry of Education of the Chinese Nationalist Government newly founded the National Peking Senior Industrial Vocational School and appointed Chen Guangxi as principal. In late 1949, upon the establishment of Communist China, Chen joined a design institute in the Ministry of Machinery Industry and worked as the chief engineer.

Chen paid close attention to electronic computers were introduced in western countries in early 1950s. In 1957, he left for Harbin. At Harbin Institute of Technology, Chen initiated the first electronic computer discipline in China.

== Research career ==
=== Analog computer ===
In 1958, Chen and his team developed the first-ever structural analog computer in China. The machine could speak a few words and play chess. This intelligent chess-playing computer could calculate 40,000 times per second, was capable of logical reasoning, and could complete specific tasks of judgment.

=== Magnetic core ===
In 1963, Professor Chen presided over the development of ultra-small magnetic core, the precondition for the development of megacomputers. Later, under the guidance of Chen, the team carried out the magnetic core molding experiment of "rolling into a belt and rubbering into a core" and achieved success. This method was cutting-edge, was quickly promoted in China. The molding technology supported the development of high-speed large-capacity memory and the manufacturing of transistor computers and small-scale integrated circuit computers. This project was a major contribution to the development of computer technology in China.

=== Fault-tolerant computer system ===
Chen was praised as pioneer of fault-tolerant computer system research in China for his research in this field. In 1973, Chen Guangxi, 70 years old, proposed a major research project to solve the problem of computer reliability, and worked on computer fault tolerance technology. The project was listed as a national project by Chinese Commission for Science, Technology and Industry for National Defense, and received a research fund of over 1 million Chinese yuan.

Chen and his development team successfully developed RCJ-1, China's first fault-tolerant computer and "a dual-mode fault-tolerant system with self-test and self-correction". and its reliability increased by more than four times. Chen Guangxi also co-published the first fault-tolerant computing monograph "Diagnosis and Fault Tolerance of Digital Systems" in cooperation with Professor Chen Tingyu of Chongqing University. In 1981, it was published by the National Defense Industry Press and became a national textbook.

Chen's computer fault-tolerant research team has achieved a number of impressive achievements, and has established a high prestige in China's aerospace industry, banking system and high-reliability computing field. The fault-tolerant technology was applied in the Chinese crewed spaceflight program Shenzhou.

=== Other projects ===
Chen has also guided other research projects such as algorithm hardware implementation and database machine, and have achieved significant scientific and technological achievements. Chen has won a number of first and second prizes of National Science and Technology Progress Award. The computer science discipline Chen initiated in HIT was listed key discipline, opened up key laboratories and postdoctoral research stations, and continued to play a leading role in China.

== Legacy ==
In 2005, a bronze statue of Chen Guangxi was unveiled in the School of Computer Science and Technology, HIT.
