= Ma Zuguang =

Chinese physicist (1928–2003)

- Born: 11 April 1928; Beijing, China
- Died: 15 July 2003 (aged 75); Beijing, China
- Citizenship: China
- Education: Shandong University; Harbin Institute of Technology
- Spouse: Sun Yuezhen (孙悦贞)
- Awards: Academician of the Chinese Academy of Sciences
- Scientific career
- Fields: optoelectronic technology
- Workplaces: Harbin Institute of Technology

Ma Zuguang (simplified Chinese: 马祖光; traditional Chinese: 馬祖光; 1928–2003) was a Chinese physicist. He is an expert in optoelectronic technology and professor of Harbin Institute of Technology (HIT). Ma founded two disciplines at HIT, nuclear physics and laser technology. He also founded the Tunable Laser Laboratory, a state-level key laboratory. He was an academician of the Chinese Academy of Sciences.

Ma graduated from Department of Physics, Shandong University in Qingdao in 1950. He later gained postgraduate degree from Harbin Institute of Technology and worked for HIT after graduation.

== Personal life ==
Ma and his wife Sun Yuezhen were classmates at Shandong University. They both became faculty members of Harbin Institute of Technology.
