= Whale Cove, Newfoundland and Labrador =

Settlement in Newfoundland and Labrador, Canada

Coordinates: 47.018°N 55.184°W

Location of Whale Cove in Newfoundland and Labrador

Whale Cove is a settlement in Newfoundland and Labrador.
