= Harbin Institute of Technology =

Public university in Harbin, Heilongjiang, China

Coordinates: 45°44′36″N 126°37′57″E

- 哈尔滨工业大学
- Motto: 规格严格，功夫到家
- Motto in English: Rigor and Mastery
- Type: Public
- Established: 7 June 1920; 106 years ago
- Affiliations: C9 League; Excellence League; APRU; Sino-Spanish University Alliance (SSU); Guangdong-Hong Kong-Macao University Alliance (GHMUA); UASR
- President: Han Jiecai
- Faculty: 2,957
- Undergraduates: 25,002
- Postgraduates: 12,710
- Location: Harbin, Heilongjiang; Weihai, Shandong; Shenzhen, Guangdong
- Campus: 1,060.823 acres (429.300 ha)
- Website: hit.edu.cn en.hit.edu.cn

Chinese name
- Simplified Chinese: 哈尔滨工业大学
- Traditional Chinese: 哈爾濱工業大學
Transcriptions
Standard Mandarin
- Hanyu Pinyin: Hā'ěrbīn Gōngyè Dàxué

The Harbin Institute of Technology (HIT) is a public science and engineering university in Nan'gang, Harbin, Heilongjiang, China. It is one of the top universities in China and is affiliated with the Ministry of Industry and Information Technology. The university is part of Project 211, Project 985, and the Double First-Class Construction. The university is a member of the C9 League.

The university was founded in 1920 as Harbin Sino-Russia Industrial School. Besides the main campus in Harbin, the university operates two satellite campuses in Shenzhen, Guangdong (as Harbin Institute of Technology, Shenzhen) and in Weihai, Shandong (as Harbin Institute of Technology, Weihai).

== History ==
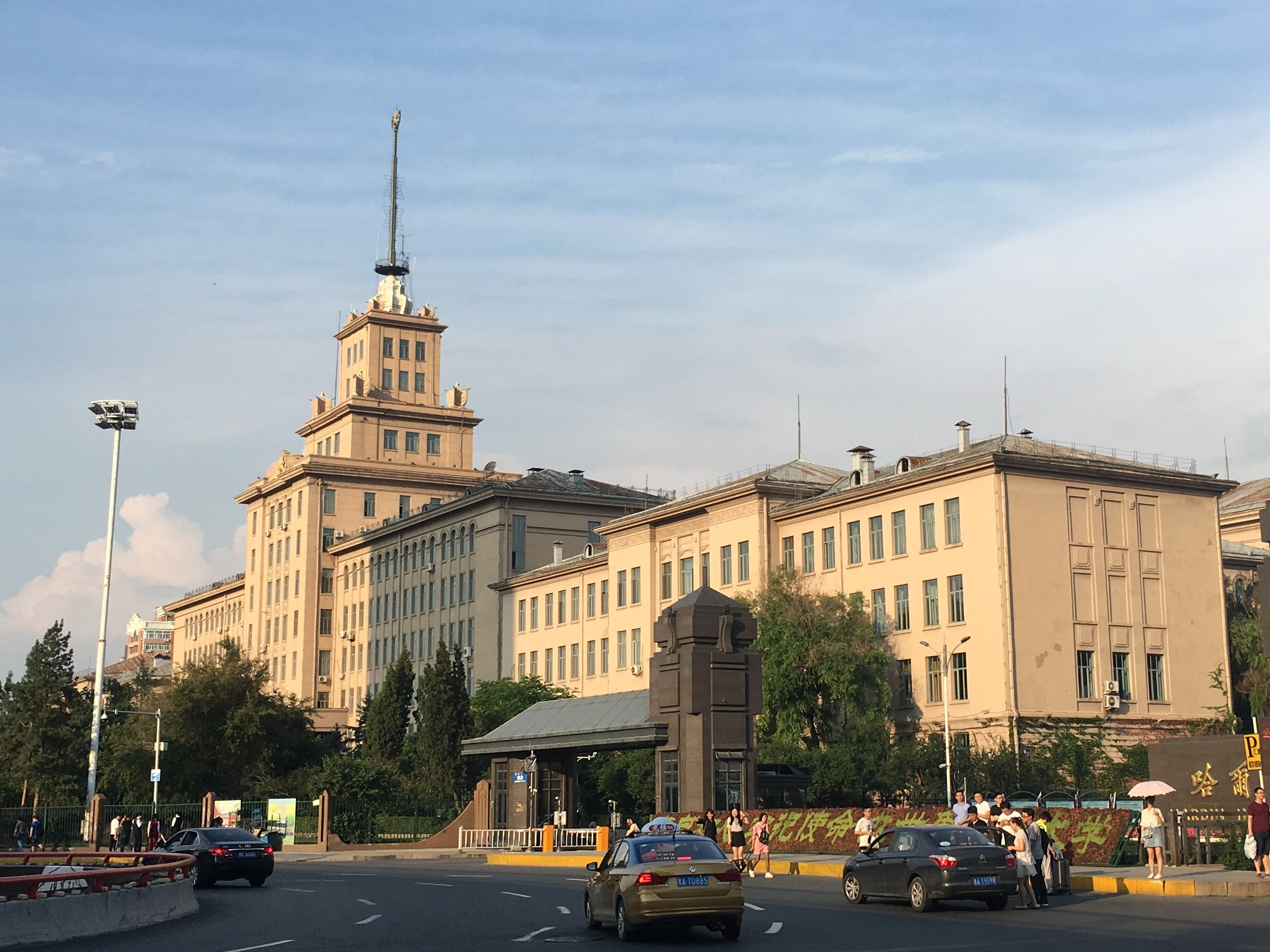
Main of Building HIT

Key events include the following:

- In 1920, the Harbin Institute of Technology was originally established as the Harbin Sino-Russian School for Industry to educate railway engineers.
- In 1931, postgraduate students were enrolled from the spring of 1931.
- In 1935, during the Japanese invasion of China, the university fell under Japanese control.
- On January 1, 1938, the name Harbin Institute of Technology was reinstated, which it has retained until the present.
- In 1945, after the Japanese defeated in World War II and evacuated, HIT was headed by the Zhongchang Railway Bureau and jointly managed by China and the Soviet Union.
- In 1949, Harbin Institute of technology recruited graduate students from all over the country. It is one of the earliest institutions to train postgraduates in China.
- In 1951, HIT was approved by the central government to become one of the two institutions of higher learning to learn advanced techniques from the USSR. HIT enjoyed a reputation as the 'Cradle for Engineers'.
- In 1954, HIT was established as one of six national key universities of China, the only one outside Beijing.
- In 1984, HIT became one of 15 national major investment universities of China. In 1984, HIT became one of the first 22 universities to establish a graduate school.
- In 1996, HIT was established as a first-class university under Project 211 (a project of National Key Universities initiated by the Ministry of Education of the People's Republic of China).
- In 1998, HIT was among the first 9 universities to be invited to join the Project 985 Club (a Chinese higher education system that provides funding priority to 39 leading research comprehensive universities).
- In 2000, Harbin Institute of Technology merged with Harbin University of Architecture, one of the famous eight old schools in China with the same roots, and formed a new Harbin Institute of Technology.
- In 2009, the Chinese C9 League was established by the Chinese central government, comprising a group of the top nine Chinese universities: Peking University, Tsinghua University, Harbin Institute of Technology, Fudan University, Nanjing University, Shanghai Jiao Tong University, University of Science and Technology of China, Xi'an Jiao Tong University and Zhejiang University.
- In 2012, HIT was listed in the Universities and Colleges Innovation Promotion Plan (高等学校创新能力提升计划), the most recent national advanced innovation alliance.
- In 2013, the results of the third round of discipline assessment were announced. The school has 16 first-level disciplines ranked in the top five in the country, and 25 disciplines rank among the top ten in the country; among them, the first-level discipline of mechanics ranks first in the nation.
- In 2017, HIT was ranked as Class A (top tier) university in the Double First-Class Construction, the most recent elite Chinese universities program.

=== Weihai Campus ===
Weihai campus is located in Weihai's Torch Hi-Tech Science Park, a scenic seaside city on the Jiaodong Peninsula.

The campus, along with the picturesque scenery and mild climate, adjoins the sea (Golden Beach) and is surrounded by mountains. It is ranked in the best 50 universities in satisfaction degree in China. It now covers totally 1,560,000 square metres (16,800,000 sq ft), with a construction area of 383,000 m^{2} (4,120,000 sq ft).

HIT, Weihai now has 10 schools and 1 department, 10,466 undergraduate students, 542 master students, 110 Ph.D. candidates, 89 international students, and 861 staff members, including 97 professors and 219 associate professors. HIT, Weihai provides 37 bachelor programs and shares HIT's 22 master programs and 18 doctoral programs, with the same HIT educational standards. Complementing to the Harbin campus, HIT, Weihai has developed with the characteristic disciplines such as Marine Science and Ocean Engineering, Automotive Engineering, and the highlights in the domains of Advanced Manufacturing, Information Technology and Electric Engineering, Computer Science and Software Engineering, Material Science and Engineering.

== Academics ==
=== Program ===
The Harbin campus of HIT offers 86 undergraduate degrees across its eighteen schools along with 41 master programs, 29 doctoral programs and 24 post-doctoral research programs.

- School of Architecture
- School of Astronautics
- School of Chemistry and Chemical Engineering
- School of Civil Engineering
- School of Computer Science and Technology
- School of Economy and Management
- School of Electrical Engineering and Automation
- School of Electronics and Information Engineering
- School of Energy Science and Engineering
- School of Power Engineering and Engineering Thermophysics
- School of International Studies
- School of Life Science and Technology
- School of Marxism
- School of Material Science and Engineering
- School of Mechatronics Engineering
- School of Transportation Science and Technology
- School of Science
- School of Environment
- School of Humanities, Social Science & Law

As of 2019, there were 15,675 undergraduate students, 6,518 doctoral students and 9,680 master graduate students at the Harbin campus, including 1,984 international students from 128 countries and regions.

=== General Rankings ===
University rankings
BCUR National	Domestic	14
Wu Shulian National	Domestic	12
CUAA National	Alumni	14
QS National	General	10
THE National	General	9
QS Asia (Asia version)	General	58
THE Asia (Asia version)	General	22
ARWU World	Research	97
QS World	General	190
THE World	General	96
USNWR World	General	111

Nationally, HIT is consistently ranked among China's top-10 research comprehensive universities and ranked No.1 in Northeast China region, which includes the province of Liaoning, Jilin, and Heilongjiang with a combination of more than 100 million population.

HIT was ranked the best in Northeast China, #9 in China and #143 worldwide in 2025 in terms of aggregate performance from the three most widely observed university rankings (THE+ARWU+QS) as reported by the Aggregate Ranking of Top Universities.

For 2026, HIT was ranked #96 by Times Higher Education World University Rankings and 97th by Academic Ranking of World Universities. It was ranked #111 by U.S. News & World Report, and #147 by the Center for World University Rankings.

Internationally, HIT is regarded as one of the most reputable Chinese universities by the Times Higher Education World Reputation Rankings where it ranked 101st globally. HIT graduates are highly desired worldwide, with its Graduate Employability rankings placed at # 143 globally in the 2021 Global Employability University Ranking by Times Higher Education.

=== Research Rankings ===
Regarding scientific research output, the Nature Index 2025 ranked HIT the No.27 university in the Asia Pacific region, and 46th in the world among the global universities. The 2025 CWTS Leiden Ranking ranked HIT 14th in the world by total publications and 22nd in the world based on the number of their scientific publications belonging to the top 1% in their fields for the time period 2020–2023.

=== Subject Rankings ===
Research at Harbin Institute of Technology spans a broad range of topics with a strong focus on engineering sciences. HIT has been ranked in the top 10 Best Global Universities for Engineering by the U.S. News & World Report Best Global Universities Ranking since the ranking's inception in 2014 by the US News & World Reports. As of 2024, it is ranked 3rd globally in Engineering.

Field	Subject	World Rank 2026
Engineering	Instruments Science & Technology	1
Engineering	Mechanical Engineering	3
Engineering	Chemical Engineering	5
Engineering	Aerospace Engineering	5
Engineering	Artificial Intelligence	5
Engineering	Civil Engineering	6
Engineering	Environmental Science & Engineering	7
Engineering	Metallurgical Engineering	7
Engineering	Electrical & Electronic Engineering	10
Engineering	Robotic Science & Engineering	11
Engineering	Automation & Control	13
Engineering	Marine/Ocean Engineering	15
Engineering	Energy Science & Engineering	16
Engineering	Computer Science & Engineering	21
Engineering	Remote Sensing	22
Engineering	Transportation Science & Technology	23
Engineering	Materials Science & Engineering	24
Engineering	Telecommunication Engineering	30
Engineering	Water Resources	30
Engineering	Nanoscience & Nanotechnology	37
Engineering	Textile Science & Engineering	44
Engineering	Biotechnology	51-75
Social Sciences	Hospitality & Tourism Management	51-75
Social Sciences	Library & Information Science	51-75
Natural Sciences	Mathematics	76-100
Natural Sciences	Chemistry	76-100
Engineering	Biomedical Engineering	101-150
Natural Sciences	Oceanography	151-200
Social Sciences	Statistics	151-200
Natural Sciences	Physics	201-300
Natural Sciences	Earth Sciences	201-300
Engineering	Food Science & Technology	201-300
Social Sciences	Management	201-300
Social Sciences	Economics	301-400
Social Sciences	Business Administration	301-400
Life Sciences	Agricultural Sciences	401-500

== Research ==
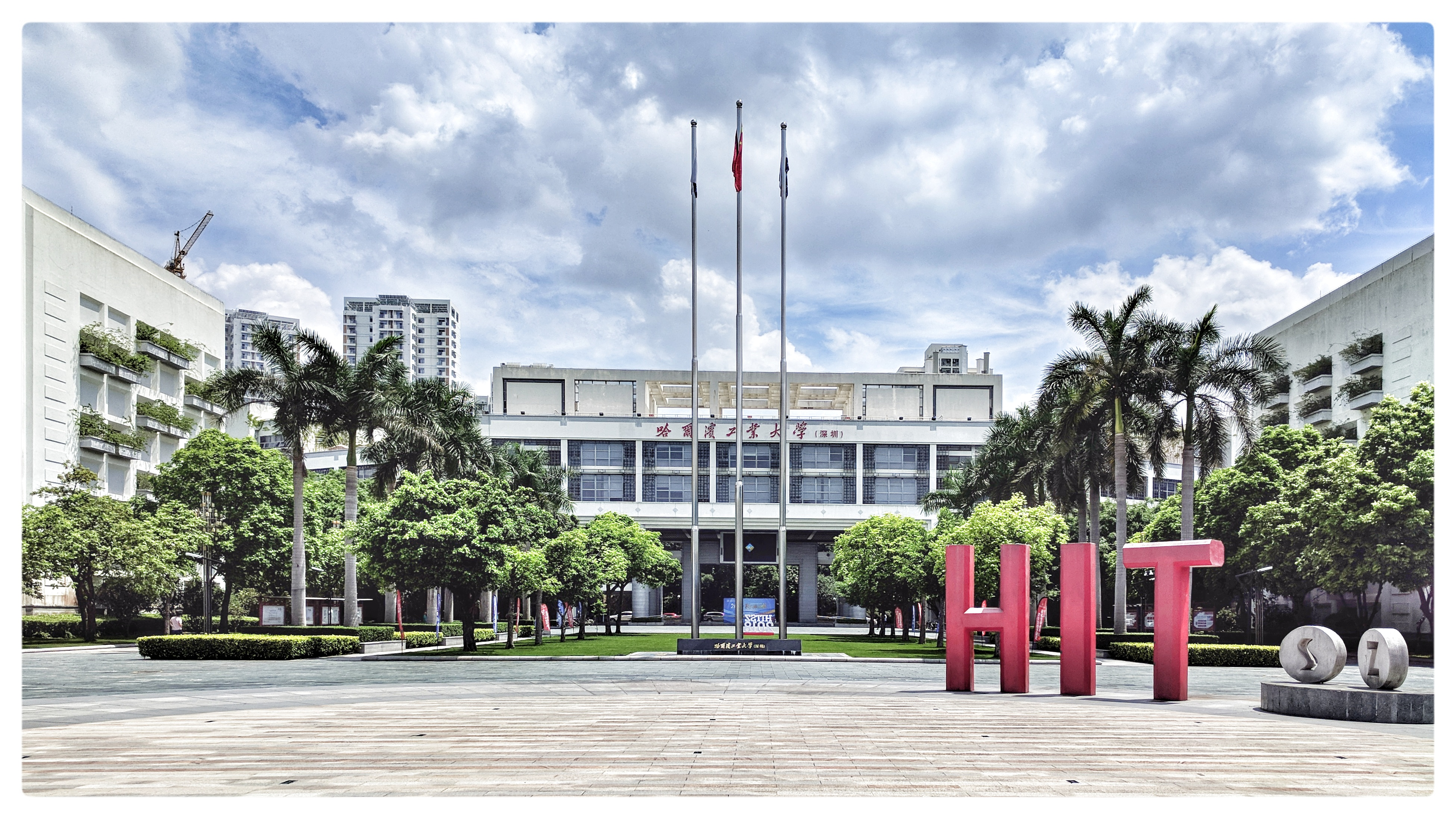
Harbin Institute of Technology Shenzhen campus

Its faculty and students have invented many 'firsts' in China: the first analog computer in 1957, the first digital computer in 1958, the first intelligent chess computer, the first arc welding robot, the first world-class new system radar, the first IC CMOS chip with its own copyright, the first superway, computer real-time 3D image creation system, and the first high-performance computer controlled fiber twister. HIT undertakes research covered by official secrets (e.g. in space science and defense-related technologies). It made the largest contribution to the success of the Shenzhou series spacecraft and Kuaizhou series spacecraft. One minor planet (#55838) is named after the Harbin Institute of Technology and nicknamed "Hagongda Star" by the International Astronomical Union for HIT's achievements in science and engineering.

HIT is known to have close links to the People's Liberation Army and the space program of China as one of the main universities in China for space and defense-related research. HIT is one of the Seven Sons of National Defence. HIT has made major contributions to the Chinese Shenzhou spacecraft project. In 2010, the Astronautics Innovation Research Center was established at HIT in conjunction with the China Aerospace Science and Technology Corporation. The establishment is the biggest investment of this class in China. In May 2020, the United States Bureau of Industry and Security added to HIT to the Entity List for its activities in support of the People's Liberation Army.

== Notable faculty and alumni ==
=== Academia and education ===
- Chen Guangxi, computer scientist and professor who founded the discipline of computer science in HIT.
- Fang Binxing, computer scientist, former president of Beijing University of Posts and Telecommunications, chief designer of the Great Firewall of China.
- Liu Yongtan, radar technology and signal processing expert, member of Chinese Academy of Sciences and Chinese Academy of Engineering, and winner of Highest Science and Technology Award in 2018.
- Ma Zuguang, an expert in optoelectronic technology and a former member of the Chinese Academy of Sciences.
- Yang Shuzi, engineer, member of Chinese Academy of Sciences, former president of Huazhong University of Science and Technology.

=== Business and entrepreneurship ===
- Li Shufu, billionaire businessman, chairman of Zhejiang Geely Holding Group Co. Ltd. and Volvo Cars.
- Yuan Jinhua, co-founder of SANY Group, the third-largest heavy equipment manufacturer in the world.
- Zhang Jian, co-founder of Broad Group.
- Zhang Siming, founder, and CEO of Shenzhen Neptunus Pharmaceutical Company Limited.

=== Engineering and technology ===
- Song Jian, aerospace engineer, former president of Chinese Academy of Engineering, member of Chinese Academy of Sciences and Chinese Academy of Engineering, and a foreign member of US National Academy of Engineering, Russian Academy of Sciences, and the Royal Swedish Academy of Engineering Sciences.
- Sun Jiadong, rocket and satellite technology expert, chief designer for Chinese Lunar Exploration Program, and member of Chinese Academy of Sciences and International Academy of Astronautics.
- Abdul Waheed, Power Engineer from Pakistan.

=== Politics and government ===
- Li Changchun, former senior leader of Chinese Communist Party, member of the Politburo Standing Committee, and Chairman of the CCP Central Guidance Commission for Building Spiritual Civilization.
- Li Jinai, general in the People's Liberation Army, and director of the General Political Department of the PLA.
- Li Zhanshu, member of the Politburo Standing Committee, and Chairman of the Standing Committee of the National People's Congress.
- Ma Xingrui, member of the Politburo and party secretary of Xinjiang, aerospace engineer, former vice president of HIT, and former director of China National Space Administration.
- Sun Yun-suan, former Premier of the Republic of China, and chief architects of Taiwan's "Economic Miracle".
- Wang Zhaoguo, former governor of Fujian, former head of the United Front Work Department, and former vice-chairman of the CPPCC.
- Xu Dazhe, governor of Hunan province, aerospace engineer, and former chief administrator of China National Space Administration.
- Zhang Chunxian, vice-chairperson of the Standing Committee of the National People's Congress.

=== Sports and arts ===
- Kong Linghui, table tennis player, gold medal winner of Summer Olympic Games and World Table Tennis Championships.
- Shi Kang, writer, scriptwriter.

== See also ==
- APRU
- Project 985
- Project 211
- Plan 111
