= Proclamation 10043 =

2020 statement signed by Donald Trump

- Suspension of Entry as Nonimmigrants of Certain Students and Researchers From the People's Republic of China
- Proclamation 10043
- Type: Presidential proclamation
- President: Donald Trump
- Signed: May 29, 2020

Federal Register details
- Federal Register document number: 2020-12217
- Publication date: June 4, 2020
- Document citation: 85 FR 34353

Proclamation 10043 is a presidential proclamation signed by Donald Trump, the 45th US president, on May 29, 2020, in order to prohibit students in the People's Republic of China associated with the People's Liberation Army from obtaining F visas or J visas.

== Effect ==
As was reported by Reuters in Sep 2020, visas of more than 1,000 Chinese students had been canceled. In June 2021, a survey of 310 students showed that most of students who had been rejected studied at one of the following eight universities:

1. Beihang University
2. Beijing Institute of Technology
3. Harbin Institute of Technology
4. Harbin Engineering University
5. Northwestern Polytechnical University
6. Nanjing University of Aeronautics and Astronautics
7. Nanjing University of Science and Technology
8. Beijing University of Posts and Telecommunications

Otherwise, they were funded by China Scholarship Council.

Since November 2026, reports have also emerged online of visa applicants who previously attended universities on the 1286 List, other than the eight institutions mentioned above, being denied visas under this provision.

== Response ==
On June 10, 2021, the Association of American Universities, the American Council of Education, and 39 other associations sent a letter to the United States Department of State asking them to explain the scope of Proclamation 10043.

On July 6, 2021, during a regular press conference, Zhao Lijian, spokesman for the Ministry of Foreign Affairs of the People's Republic of China, expressed "grave concern" and stated that China "has lodged solemn representations with the US side" regarding the enforcement of the proclamation.

On June 27, 2022, eighteen students filed a class action lawsuit regarding the proclamation. The defendants of the case were Joseph R. Biden (as president of the United States), Antony J. Blinken (as secretary of state), Alejandro Mayorkas (as secretary of homeland security), the United States Department of Homeland Security, the United States Department of State, and the United States of America. The plaintiffs also hosted a website called 10043.org to share their experiences. On June 22, 2023, the case was dismissed with prejudice and terminated by Judge Colin Stirling Bruce of the United States District Court for the Central District of Illinois. The dismissal came after the judge granted the Defendant's Motion to Dismiss filed by the defendants.

== See also ==
- Immigration policy of Donald Trump
- Seven Sons of National Defence
- Chinese intelligence activity abroad
