= National Key Universities =

Term for prestigious universities in China

National Key Universities (China)
- 国家重点大学
- Successor: Project 211, Double First-Class Construction
- Formation: 1954; 72 years ago
- Region served: China
- Members: over 90 public universities nationwide

National Key Universities
- Simplified Chinese: 国家重点大学
- Traditional Chinese: 國家重點大學
Transcriptions
Standard Mandarin
- Hanyu Pinyin: guójiā zhòngdiǎn dàxué
Yue: Cantonese
- Jyutping: gwok3 gaa1 cung5 dim2 daai6 hok6

National Key Universities (Chinese: 国家重点大学; pinyin: guójiā zhòngdiǎn dàxué) is a term previously used to refer to universities recognized as prestigious and which received a high level of support from the central government of the People's Republic of China. The term is no longer in official use by 1990s. The term "zhòngdiǎn" (重点), translated here as "key" in this phrase can also be translated as "major", "priority" or "focal". The term "National Key Universities" then became defunct, and these schools are now normally referred to as "Double First Class Universities", based on the China state Double First-Class Construction. However, it remains part of the vernacular, as evidenced by some Chinese media articles which still refer to "National Key Universities".

== Membership ==
In December 1954, six schools were first designated by the Ministry of Education as national key universities: Peking University, Tsinghua University, Renmin University of China, Harbin Institute of Technology, Beijing Medical College, and Beijing University of Agriculture.

A list of 20 National Key Universities was subsequently identified by the Chinese government in 1959, and included Peking University, Tsinghua University, University of Science and Technology of China, Renmin University, Beijing University of Agriculture, Beijing Normal University, Beijing Institute of Aeronautics, Beijing Institute of Technology, Beijing Medical University, Fudan University, Shanghai Jiao Tong University, East China Normal University, Shanghai First Medical College, Tianjin University, Harbin Institute of Technology, Xi'an Jiao Tong University and Northwestern Polytechnical University.

By the end of 1960, another 44 universities were added into the list, which amounted to 64 national key universities. By the end of 1965, there were 68 National Key Universities, including Zhejiang University, Peking Union Medical College, Nanjing University, Sun Yat-sen University, Southeast University, Tongji University, Wuhan University, Huazhong University of Science and Technology, Nankai University, Xiamen University, South China University of Technology, Sichuan University, Shandong University, Jilin University, Lanzhou University, Dalian University of Technology, Chongqing University, University of Electronic Science and Technology of China, Northeastern University, Beijing Forestry University, and Shandong Ocean College among others.

By 1978, there were 88 National Key Universities, including Minzu University of China and Hunan University. From 1978 to 1981, another 11 national key higher education institutions were successively added and restored, including Southern Medical University, Nanjing Agricultural University, Beijing Language and Culture University and Northwest A&F University among others.

== History ==
The Chinese government made several batches of national key universities in history (from 1950s to 1980s). From 1954 to the 1980s, 99 national key universities were identified (some have been merged into other universities). The current project, established in 2015, is the Double First-Class Construction to create world-class universities by 2050. In October 2015, the State Council of People's Republic of China published the 'Overall Plan for Promoting the Construction of World First-Class Universities and First-Class Disciplines (Double First-Class University Plan)', which made new arrangements for the development of higher education in China, replacing previous projects of Chinese higher education. A total of 140 Double First Class Universities were approved to be included in the state Double First-Class Construction by the central government of China in 2017, representing the top 5% of the higher education institutions (3,012) in this country.

As of February 2022, the 147 Double First Class Universities are considered as the most elite part of higher education in Mainland China.

== See also ==
- List of universities in China
- Double First-Class Construction
- State Key Laboratories
- C9 League
- Project 211
- Project 985
- Excellence League
- Big Four Institutes of Technology
- Yangtze Delta Universities Alliance
