= Seven Sons of National Defence =

Group of universities in China

- Simplified Chinese: 国防七子
- Traditional Chinese: 國防七子
Transcriptions
Standard Mandarin
- Hanyu Pinyin: Guó Fáng Qī Zǐ

The Seven Sons of National Defence (Chinese: 国防七子) is a grouping of the public universities affiliated with the Ministry of Industry and Information Technology of China. They are widely believed to have close scientific research partnerships and projects with the People's Liberation Army. However, these are not official part of the Academic institutions of the Chinese armed forces.

== Universities ==
The universities of the Seven Sons of National Defence include:

- Beihang University in Haidian, Beijing
- Beijing Institute of Technology in Haidian, Beijing
- Harbin Engineering University in Harbin, Heilongjiang
- Harbin Institute of Technology in Harbin, Heilongjiang
- Nanjing University of Aeronautics and Astronautics in Nanjing, Jiangsu
- Nanjing University of Science and Technology in Nanjing, Jiangsu
- Northwestern Polytechnical University in Xi'an, Shaanxi

== Views ==
Three quarters of university graduates recruited by defense related state-owned enterprises in China come from the Seven Sons. The Seven Sons devote at least half of their research budgets to military products.

According to the Hoover Institution, the Seven Sons "operate as prime pathways for harvesting US research and diverting it to military applications."

In 2020, the United States government banned students from the Seven Sons schools to study in graduate programs in the United States.

== See also ==
- Seven Sisters (colleges)
- C9 League
- Excellence League
- Double First Class University Plan
- Project 985
- Project 211
- Proclamation 10043
