= HEU HiSiBi Sky Journey 1 USV =

Chinese unmanned surface vehicle

History

PRC
- Commissioned: 2017
- In service: 10+

General characteristics
- Type: USV
- Displacement: 7.5 long tons (7.6 t)
- Length: 12.2 m (40 ft 0 in)
- Propulsion: Combined marine diesel & electrical
- Speed: 50 kt
- Electronic warfare & decoys: None
- Armament: RCWS
- Armour: None
- Aircraft carried: None

Sky Journey (Tian-Xing, 天行) 1 is a Chinese unmanned surface vessel jointly developed by Harbin Engineering University (HEU) and Shenzhen HiSiBi Shipyard. The existence of Sky Travel 1 usv was first revealed in December 2017 at the Fifth Chinese Oceanic Economic Exhibition jointly held by the provincial government of Guangdong and Chinese State Oceanic Administration in Zhanjiang.

Completed in September 2017, Sky Journey 1 is an air-cushioned vehicle designed to perform various military, paramilitary and police tasks, and is equipped with RCWS that can be armed with various sensors and small cabiler guns. The combined diesel and electric propulsion system enable the USV to reach top speed of 50 kts. More than ten units have already been built by December 2017. Specification:

- Length: 12.2 meter
- Displacement: 7.5 ton
- Top speed: 50 kt
- Propulsion: combined diesel and electric

Name (English)	Name (Han 中文)	Displacement (t)	Commissioned	Status
Sky Journey 1	天行1号	7.5	2017	Active
