= C9 League =

Inter-university seminar of nine public universities in China

- 九校联盟
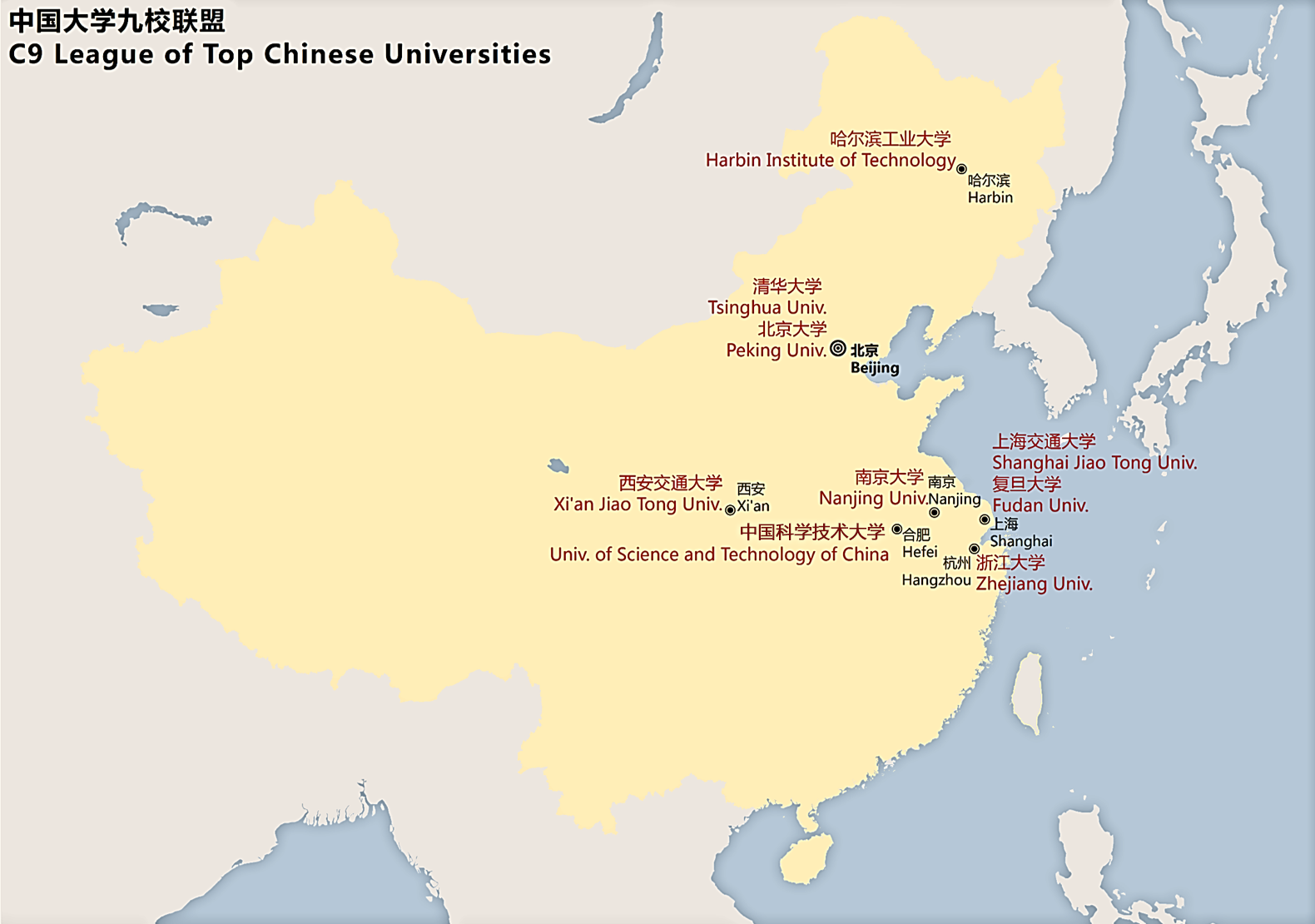
- Formation: 4 May 1998; 28 years ago
- Founded at: Beijing, China
- Region served: China
- Members: 9 universities nationwide

Chinese name
- Simplified Chinese: 九校联盟
- Traditional Chinese: 九校聯盟
Transcriptions
Standard Mandarin
- Hanyu Pinyin: Jiǔxiào Liánméng

The C9 League is a self-selected conference of nine public universities in China. It was established on May 4, 1998, during the 100th anniversary of Peking University.

== Members ==
The C9 league comprises nine public universities, listed in alphabetic order:

University	City	Estd.
Fudan University	Shanghai	1905
Harbin Institute of Technology	Harbin, Heilongjiang	1920
Nanjing University	Nanjing, Jiangsu	1902
Peking University	Beijing	1898
Shanghai Jiao Tong University	Shanghai	1896
Tsinghua University	Beijing	1911
University of Science and Technology of China	Hefei, Anhui	1958
Xi'an Jiaotong University	Xi'an, Shaanxi	1896
Zhejiang University	Hangzhou, Zhejiang	1928

All C9 League schools are part of Project 985, Project 211, Plan 111, and Double First-Class Construction. In 2014, the University of the Chinese Academy of Sciences started to participate in the C9 League meetings.

== Rankings ==
The following are the rankings of the C9 schools in the four major world university rankings that are recognized by governments in multiple countries and regions.

University	City	QS (2027)	THE (2027)	ARWU (2026)	USNWR (2026)	Average
Members
Tsinghua University	Beijing	14	11	18	6	12
Peking University	Beijing	13	13	22	19	17
Shanghai Jiao Tong University	Shanghai	36	39	27	37	35
Zhejiang University	Hangzhou	47	=34	24	35	35
Fudan University	Shanghai	26	38	41	49	38
University of Science and Technology of China	Hefei	=134	=51	39	59	71
Nanjing University	Nanjing	=90	59	70	77	74
Harbin Institute of Technology	Harbin	190	96	97	111	123
Xi'an Jiaotong University	Xi'an	=296	=196	79	129	175
Participant
University of Chinese Academy of Sciences	Beijing	=360	N/A	N/A	53	206

== See also ==
- List of universities in China
- Double First-Class Construction, a scheme for improving 147 of China's top universities
- Excellence League, an alliance of leading Chinese universities with strong backgrounds in engineering
- Russell Group – a group of research-based universities in the United Kingdom
- Project 985, a former project for developing 39 leading research universities in China
- Project 211, a former program for developing 115 comprehensive universities in China
- National Key Universities (China)
- Seven Sons of National Defence
