= Excellence League =

Alliance of top Chinese universities in Engineering

- 卓越联盟
- Formation: 2010; 16 years ago
- Founded at: Tianjin University, Tianjin, China
- Region served: China
- Members: 9 universities

Chinese name
- Simplified Chinese: 卓越联盟
- Traditional Chinese: 卓越聯盟
Transcriptions
Standard Mandarin
- Hanyu Pinyin: Zhuóyuè Liánméng

The Excellence League (E9 League; 卓越联盟) is an alliance of nine engineering-focused universities in China. The association was established in 2010 at Tianjin University.

== Membership ==
The Excellence League comprises nine public universities, including:

- Beijing Institute of Technology – Beijing
- Chongqing University – Chongqing
- Dalian University of Technology – Dalian, Liaoning
- Southeast University – Nanjing, Jiangsu
- Harbin Institute of Technology – Harbin, Heilongjiang
- South China University of Technology – Guangzhou, Guangdong
- Tianjin University – Tianjin
- Tongji University – Shanghai
- Northwestern Polytechnical University – Xi'an, Shaanxi

All Excellence League schools are part of the former Project 985, Project 211, Plan 111, as well as the current Double First Class University Plan.

== Rankings ==
The following are the rankings of the E9 schools in the four major world university rankings that are recognized by governments in multiple countries and regions.

University	Founded	Location	QS (2025)	THE (2026)	ARWU (2025)	USNWR (2025)	Average
Founding Members
Tongji University	1907	Shanghai	192	=141	101–150	124	146
Harbin Institute of Technology	1920	Harbin	=252	=131	101–150	128	159
Tianjin University	1895	Tianjin	=269	201–250	101–150	182	201
Beijing Institute of Technology	1940	Beijing	=302	201–250	101–150	156	202
South China University of Technology	1952	Guangzhou	=385	251–300	101–150	166	238
Southeast University	1902	Nanjing	=428	251–300	101–150	155	246
Northwestern Polytechnical University	1938	Xi'an	=547	251–300	101–150	207	289
Chongqing University	1929	Chongqing	=489	351–400	151–200	212	313
Dalian University of Technology	1949	Dalian	=448	401–500	151–200	261	334
Participant
Hunan University	1926	Changsha	=448	251–300	151–200	109	252

== History ==
The nine universities are all Project 985 National Key Universities with strong backgrounds in engineering. In order to implement the "Outline of the National Program for Medium and Long-term Reform and Development of Education (2010-2020)" and "Outline of the National Program for Medium and Long-term Talent Development (2010-2020)" in China, on 23 June 2010, the Ministry of Education of China called on these eight universities to start the "Excellent Engineer Education Program" kick-off meeting at Tianjin University to promote China's education for future engineers.

In November 2010, the eight universities mentioned above signed the "Framework Convention on the Education of Excellent Talents" (Chinese: 《卓越人才培养合作框架协议》) at Tongji University, Shanghai, China. Since then, the League started to boost comprehensive cooperation among member universities holding the principle of Pursue Excellence and Share the Resources. On November 30, 2010, Chongqing University declared its participants in the League, which expanded the League's coverage to 9 universities. In December 2010, the League was officially called E9 League because of this.

In 2011, Hunan University participated in the E9 league activities, carried out the joint enrollment of graduate students in 10 universities using the enrollment publicity platform interchangeably, and recommended graduate students without exams between schools. However, it was not an official member and was invited to join the E9 League President's Forum regularly as an observer and dialogue partner. Now the League is still named excellence 9, which means that the total number of member universities is 9.

== Policies ==
According to the convention signed by member universities, the cooperation among them includes:

- Explore laws and methods for educating excellent talents
- Push forward the reform of the university entrance and enrollment
- Promote joint-education for undergraduate and postgraduate students
- Promote international cooperations
- Cooperate in teaching, research and industrialization

The League now offers exchange programs for undergraduates. Students can choose to study in another league member as long as he or she is enrolled by one of the 10 members. In this way, all the students within these 10 universities can share educational resources.

== See also ==
- List of universities in China
- Double First Class University Plan, a scheme for improving 147 China's top universities
- Project 985, a former project for developing 39 leading research universities in China
- Project 211, a former program for developing 115 comprehensive universities in China
- C9 League, a formal group of 9 elite universities in China
- Seven Sons of National Defence
- National Key Universities (China)
