= Jiang Lan =

Jiang Lan, may refer to:

- Jiang Lan (sprinter), Chinese sprinter.
- Jiang Lan (scientist), Chinese scientist, member of the Chinese Academy of Sciences.
