= Nanjing University of Science and Technology =

Public university in Nanjing, Jiangsu, China

Coordinates: 32°1′59.88″N 118°51′6.92″E

- 南京理工大学
- Former names: Artillery Engineering College of the PLA (炮兵工程学院); East China Institute of Engineering (华东工程学院); East China Institute of Technology (华东工学院)
- Motto: 进德修业 志道鼎新
- Motto in English: Cultivate virtue and pursue learning; aspire to truth and innovation.
- Type: Public
- Established: 1953; 73 years ago
- Affiliations: Sino-Spanish University Alliance (SSU)
- President: Yang Yixin
- Vice-president: Chen Qian; He Yong; Lu Guibin
- Academic staff: 2,078
- Students: 27,063
- Undergraduates: 16,159
- Postgraduates: 8,021
- Doctoral students: 1,836
- Location: 200 Xiaolingwei Street, Xuanwu District, Nanjing, Jiangsu, 210094, China
- Campus: Suburban
- Colors: Purple
- Website: njust.edu.cn

Chinese name
- Simplified Chinese: 南京理工大学
- Traditional Chinese: 南京理工大學
Transcriptions
Standard Mandarin
- Hanyu Pinyin: Nánjīng Lǐgōng Dàxué

The Nanjing University of Science and Technology (NJUST; 南京理工大学) is a provincial public university in Xuanwu, Nanjing, Jiangsu, China. It is affiliated with the Ministry of Industry and Information Technology, and co-sponsored with the Ministry of Education and the Jiangsu Provincial Government. The university is part of Project 211 and the Double First-Class Construction.

== History ==
The Nanjing University of Science and Technology can be traced back to 1953, as Department of Artillery Engineering of Institute of Military Engineering of the PLA (People's Liberation Army) in Harbin. Since its establishment, it aims on serving national strategies and promoting social progress. In 1962, the campus moved to Nanjing. The name of the university changed many times, and finally determined as current name in 1993. In September 1998, the name on the school badge was inscribed by Chinese president and general secretary of the Communist Party Jiang Zemin. Since June 2008, the Nanjing University of Science and Technology has been subordinated to the Ministry of Industry and Information Technology.

Evolution of the Nanjing University of Science and Technology since 1953

Institute of Military Engineering of the PLA (Harbin) (1953)	Ordnance Engineering College of the PLA (Wuhan) (1953)
Artillery Engineering College of the PLA (Wuhan) (1960)
Logistics Academy of the PLA (Beijing) (1962)
Artillery Engineering College of the PLA (Nanjing) (1962)
East China Institute of Engineering (1966)
East China Institute of Technology (1984)
Nanjing University of Science and Technology (1993)

== Academics ==
The Nanjing University of Science and Technology is a multidisciplinary university, comprising

University rankings

Global – Overall
- QS World: 701-710 (2026)

Regional – Overall
- QS Asia: =236 (2025)

academic fields including science, engineering, liberal arts, economics, business, management, law and education. In addition, it encompasses a wide array of centers, institutes, programs, and administrative support offices. It carries on its education and research on both undergraduate and postgraduate levels in 15 schools, led by a total of 70 undergraduate majors, 116 master programs and 49 doctoral programs, and 14 post-doctoral research stations.

NJUST is one of the Seven Sons of National Defence.

=== Funding Schemes ===
The Nanjing University of Science and Technology has become a National Key University of Project 211 in 1995. In 2000, the Ministry of Education approved NJUST to start the graduate school. Later in 2011, the university was authorized to build 985 Advantage Discipline Innovation Platform.

In September 2017, the Nanjing University of Science and Technology was included in the Chinese state Double First-Class Construction identified by the Ministry of Education of China.

=== Schools and departments ===
As of June 2018, the Nanjing University of Science and Technology has the following colleges and schools:

- School of Mechanical Engineering
- School of Chemical Engineering
- School of Electronic Engineering and Optoelectronic Technology
- School of Computer Science and Technology
- School of Economics and Management
- School of Energy and Power Engineering
- School of Automation
- School of Science
- School of Foreign Studies
- School of Public Affairs
- School of Materials Science and Engineering
- School of Environmental and Biological Engineering
- School of Design and Communication
- Tsien Hsue-Shen College]
- School of Intellectual Property
- School of Marxism
- School of International Education
- School of Continuing Education
- Sino-French Engineer School
- Zijin College
- Taizhou Institute of Science and Technology
- Graduate School

== Campus ==
Different from many universities in Nanjing, the Nanjing University of Science and Technology has only one main campus based in Xiaolingwei, Xuanwu District, on the south of Purple Mountain and the Sun Yat-sen Mausoleum. It covers a total area of 3,118 mu (Note: mu (亩) is a Chinese unit of measuring area, 1 mu = 614.4 m^{2} = 734.82 sq yd) (207.87 ha).

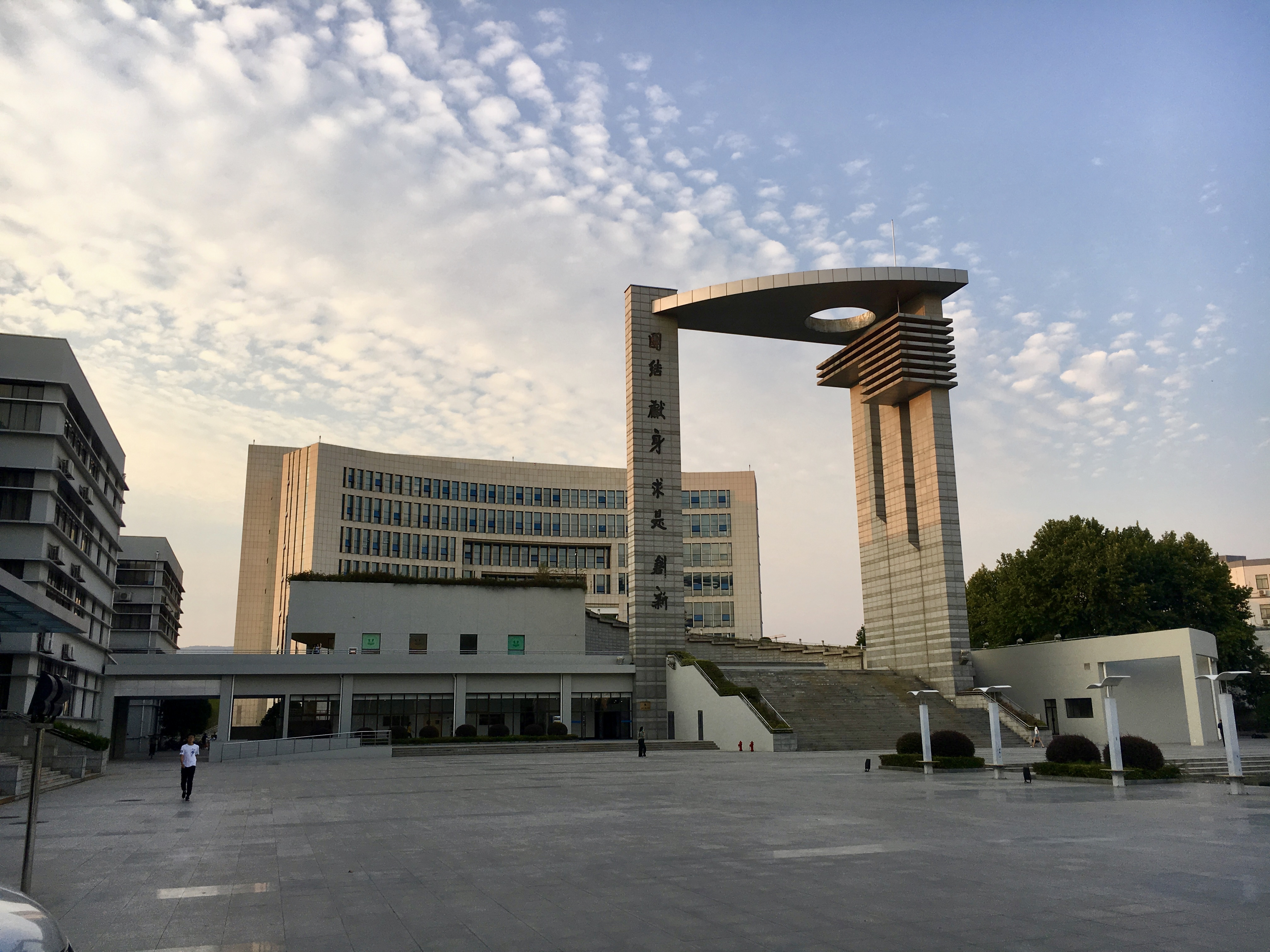
A square in front of Teaching Building No. 4 and the library of the NJUST main campus

In 1998, Zijin College of NJUST was founded in Xianlin University City, Nanjing. In June 2004, the Taizhou Institute of Science and Technology was founded in Taizhou, Jiangsu, as a branch institute of the Nanjing University of Science and Technology.

== Notable alumni ==
- Wang Zeshan, CAE member
- Ren Xinmin, aerospace engineer and specialist in astronautics and liquid rocket engine technology, CAS member
- Lu Ke, material scientist, CAS member
- Lu Zhangong, Vice Chairman of the Chinese People's Political Consultative Conference
