= Beijing Institute of Technology =

Public university in Beijing, China

- 北京理工大学
- Motto: 德以明理 学以精工
- Motto in English: Seek Truth in Virtue; Pursue Study to Perfect Practice.
- Type: Public
- Established: 1940; 86 years ago
- Academic affiliations: Excellence League, SSU, AMBA, BHUA
- President: Jiang Lan
- Faculty: 1,953 (2010)
- Administrative staff: 1,489 (2010)
- Students: 26,358 (2010)
- Undergraduates: 14,010 (2010)
- Postgraduates: 8,205 (2010)
- Doctoral students: 2,701 (2010)
- Location: Beijing, China; 39°57′28″N 116°18′30″E
- Campus: Urban, 4,734 ha
- Colors: Green and white
- Sporting affiliations: Beijing Institute of Technology F.C.
- Website: bit.edu.cn

Chinese name
- Simplified Chinese: 北京理工大学
- Traditional Chinese: 北京理工大學
Transcriptions
Standard Mandarin
- Hanyu Pinyin: Běijīng Lǐgōng Dàxué

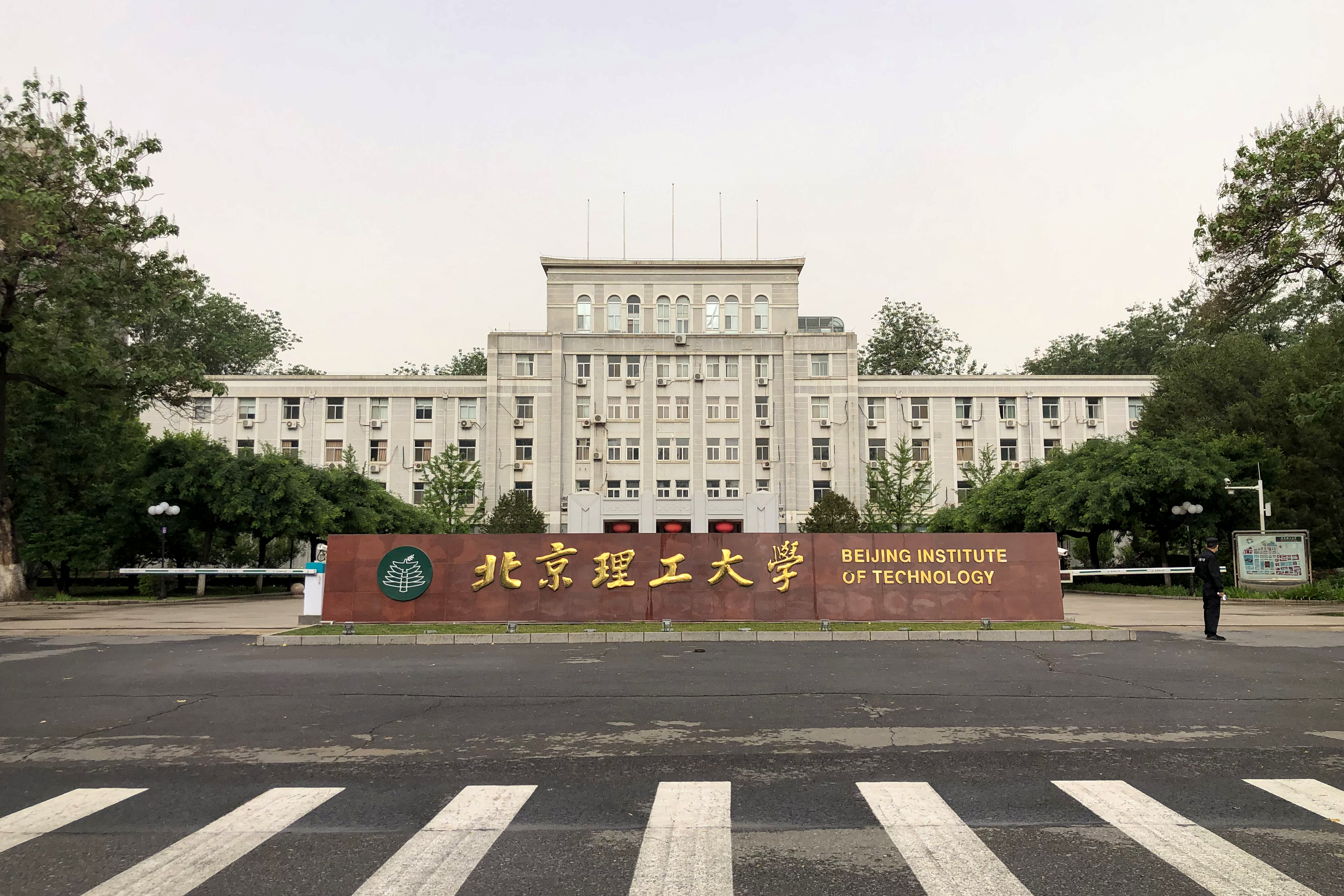
Main campus entrance of BIT

The Beijing Institute of Technology (BIT) is a public university in Haidian, Beijing, China. The university is part of Project 211, Project 985, and the Double First-Class Construction. It was originally established as the Yan'an Natural Science Academy in 1940 in Yan'an, Shaanxi. Since 2008, it has been administered by the MIIT.

== History ==
=== Yan'an period (1940–1946) ===
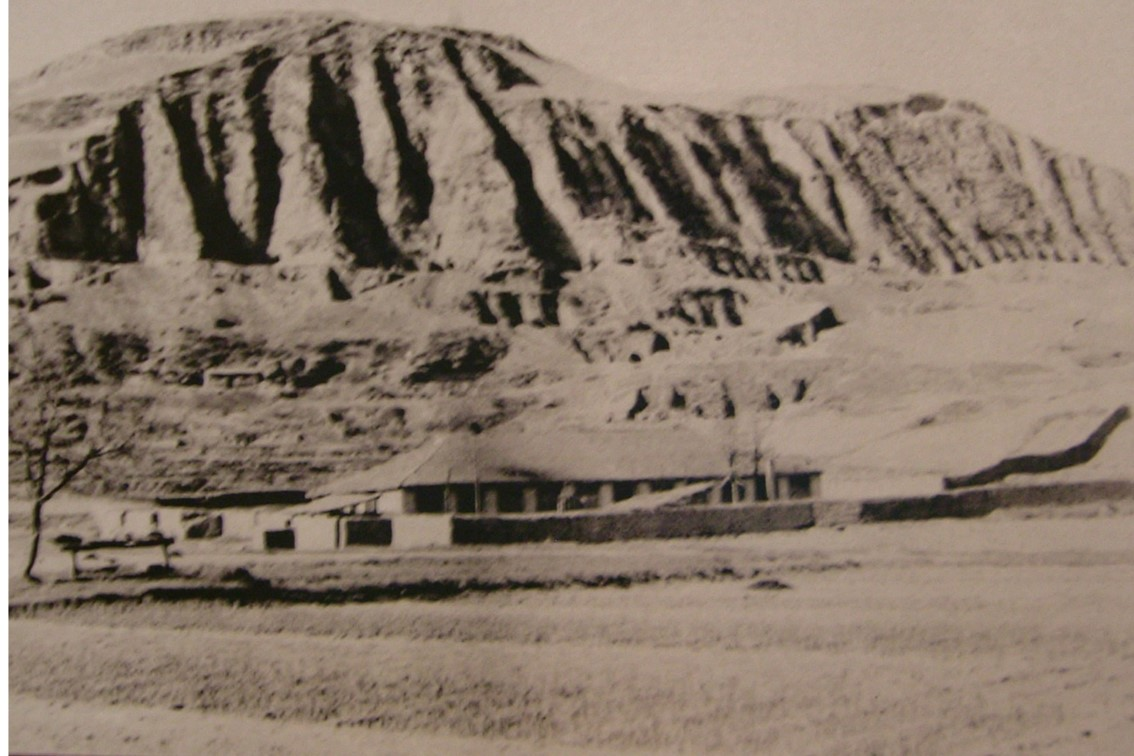
Yan'an Academy of Natural Sciences

Xu Teli, educationist and second president of BIT (1941-1943)

Beijing Institute of Technology (BIT) has its origins in the Yan'an Research Academy of Natural Sciences (延安自然科学研究院). BIT was established May 1939 in Yan'an, Shaanxi by the Chinese Communist Party with the aim of training science and engineering professionals. In January 1940 when China was undergoing the most difficult phase of the War of Resistance Against Japan the Central Committee of the Chinese Communist Party reformed the Yan'an Research Academy of Natural Sciences into the Yan'an Academy of Natural Sciences (延安自然科学院). The mission of the academy was to assist industrial development in the Shanxi-Chahar-Hebei Border Region. Opened on 1 September 1940 it was the first science and engineering university founded by the Chinese Communist Party. Li Fuchun, secretary of the CCP Committee for Shaan-Gan-Ning Border Region, was appointed as the first president and was succeeded by educationist Xu Teli.

During the founding period the Yan'an Academy of Natural Sciences received support from international organizations and individuals including Rewi Alley.

In March 1943 the Yan'an Academy of Natural Sciences merged with the newly founded University of Yan'an (延安大学) and was named the School of Natural Sciences University of Yan'an (延安大学自然科学院).

At the end of 1945 the University of Yan'an moved to the north of China.

=== Shanxi-Chahar-Hebei Border Region period (1946–1949) ===
In January 1946 the School of Natural Sciences moved to Zhangjiakou. The Central Bureau of Shanxi-Chahar-Hebei Border Region decided to settle the School at Zhangjiakou and merged it with Shanxi-Chahar-Hebei Border Region College of Technology (晋察冀边区工科专门学校) to form the Shanxi-Chahar-Hebei Border Region College (晋察冀边区工业专门学校).

At the end of the same year the Shanxi-Chahar-Hebei Border Region Institute moved to Hebei and merged with the Shanxi-Chahar-Hebei Border Region Academy of Railway (晋察冀边区铁路学院) to form the Shanxi-Chahar-Hebei Border Region College of Industry and Transportation (晋察冀工业交通学院). One year later the Shanxi-Chahar-Hebei Border Region Institute moved to Jingxing County and was renamed the Shanxi-Chahar-Hebei Border Region Bureau of Industry College of Technology (晋察冀边区工业局工业学校). In August 1948 it merged with the Institute of Technology Northern University (北方大学工学院) to form the Institute of Technology North China University (华北大学工学院).

=== Institute of Technology North China University period (1949–1952) ===
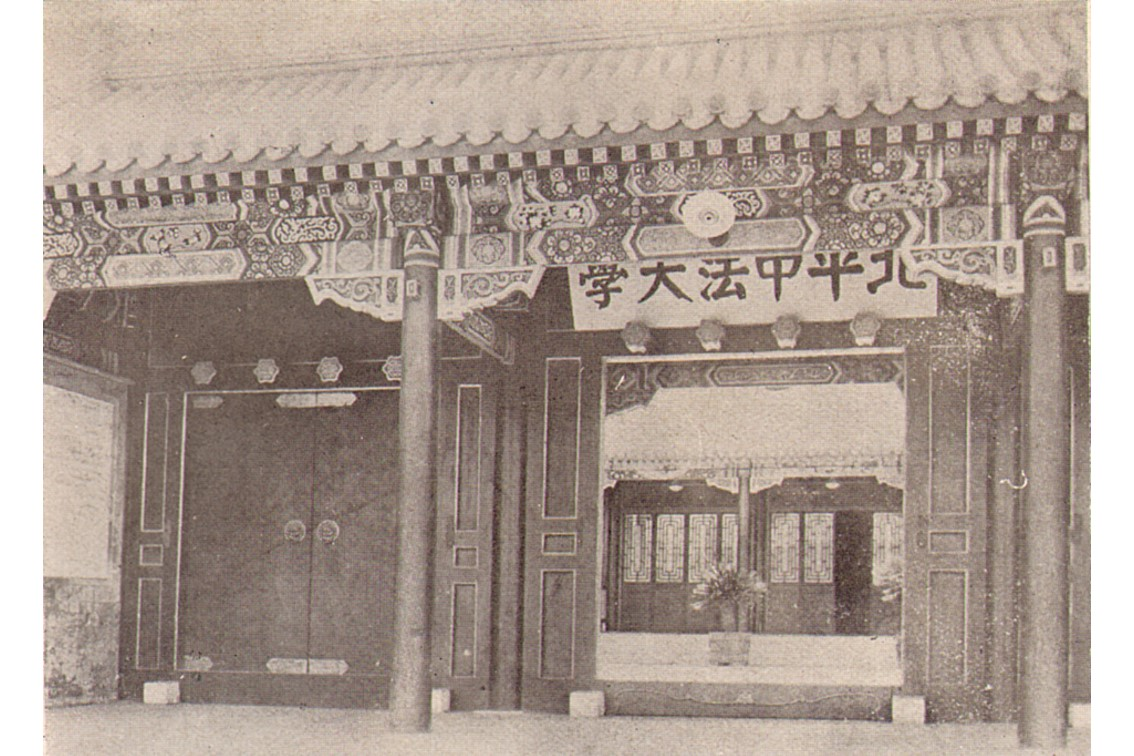
Gate of Sino-French University

Gate of Institute of Technology, North China University in the 1950s, on the original site of Sino-French University

The home campus of Sino-French University (中法大学) and its Departments of Mathematics, Physics and Chemistry were merged into the Institute of Technology North China University in October 1950.

During the Cultural Revolution most research at Beijing Institute of Technology came to a halt but quickly resumed after 1976.

=== Post-economic reform period (1988–present) ===
BIT is traditionally strong in national defense and military technologies research, especially radar, missiles and armored combat vehicles but also maintained outstanding research strength in electrical engineering, automation, photonics, mechanical engineering, chemical engineering, computer science and industrial design.

As of 2015 BIT has established cooperation with more than 200 universities from 58 countries and implemented student exchange programs with more than 40 universities in the world including the Technical University of Munich, Bauman Moscow State Technical University, Tokyo Institute of Technology, University of California and The Australian National University.

== Campus ==
=== Zhongguancun, Beijing ===
Zhongguangcun campus has an area of 920,700 square meters, including a floor space of 724,000 square meters. It is the oldest campus of BIT. Since the opening of Liangxiang campus in 2007 Zhongguancun campus is mainly used to host higher year undergraduate students and postgraduate students.

=== Liangxiang, Beijing ===
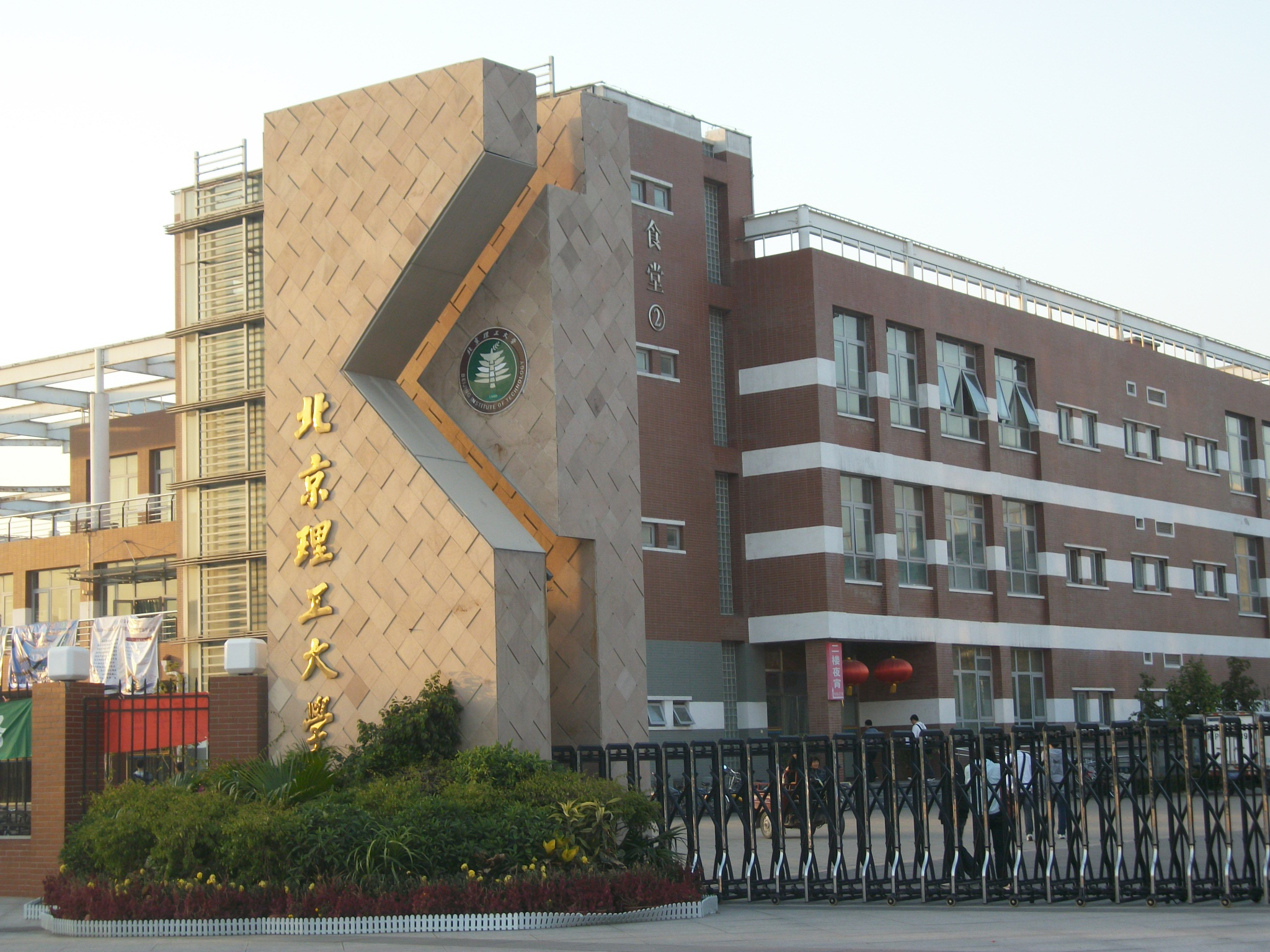
Gate of the Liangxiang northern campus.

Since 2007 undergraduate students are located on the Liangxiang campus which is based in Liangxiang University Town, Fangshan District of Beijing.

=== Xishan, Beijing ===
Xishan Laboratory Research Center is located in Beijing.

=== Fangshan, Beijing ===
The BIT Fangshan campus was co-founded by BIT and the Fangshan District government and is located in the Fangshan District of Beijing.

=== Qinhuangdao, Hebei ===
Founded in 1984, the Qinhuangdao campus offers one-year pre-university program for ethnic minority students whose first language is not Mandarin. Qinhuangdao campus also accepts pre-university ethnic minority students who will apply to Beihang University, Nanjing University of Aeronautics and Astronautics, Nanjing University of Science and Technology, Harbin Institute of Technology, Harbin Engineering University and Northwestern Polytechnical University.

=== Zhuhai, Guangdong ===
The Zhuhai campus is based in the Guangdong province of China. The speciality of Zhuhai campus lies in providing continuing education, distance learning courses and special courses related to the local economy and industry. It is home to many research institutions including a graduate school and a science park. BITZH- CUHK Optomechatronic Engineering Joint Research Center and BITZH- HKPU City and Public Security Joint Research Center are also located in Zhuhai campus.

== Education ==
BIT has 16 national key disciplines and 25 ministry-level key disciplines. BIT offers bachelor's degrees in 60 majors, Master's degrees in 144 majors and Doctorate degrees in 62 majors. It also has 17 post-doctorate stations.

== Research ==
BIT's research strength lies in electrical engineering, information engineering, automation, photonics, mechanical Engineering, vehicle engineering, aerospace engineering and chemical engineering. Emerging research areas developed in recent years include Computer Science, Industrial Design and Higher education research.

BIT has five national key laboratories (research centers), six national defense key laboratories (research centers), two MOST key laboratories (research centers) and four Beijing municipal key laboratories (research centers). It also has a national key science park. The annual research expenditure in 2004 was more than 620 million RMB.

BIT is one of the Seven Sons of National Defence.

== Rankings ==
University rankings
BCUR National	Domestic	16
Wu Shulian National	Domestic	30
CUAA National	Alumni	=24
QS National	General	15
THE National	General	14–19
QS Asia (Asia version)	General	93
THE Asia (Asia version)	General	47
ARWU World	Research	101–150
QS World	General	=302
THE World	General	201–250
USNWR World	General	179

BIT is ranked among the top 20 universities in China and top 300 in the world. In recent national level evaluations BIT was among the first 15 universities to be designated into the "Project 211". It is also the tenth university to be designated into the prestigious "Project 985". Together with Tsinghua University, Peking University, Beihang University and University of Chinese Academy of Sciences, it is widely considered to be one of the top engineering universities in Beijing.

BIT is ranked 201-300th in the WURI Global Top 100 Innovative Universities Ranking of 2021.

According to the China Discipline Ranking conducted by a research center affiliated with the China Ministry of Education, BIT ranks among top 10 nationally in the following ten disciplines:

- Information Engineering: ranked fifth.
- Optical Engineering: ranked fifth.
- Aerospace Science and Engineering: ranked fifth.
- Mechanical Engineering: ranked seventh.
- Metallurgical Engineering: ranked seventh.
- Transportation and Traffic Engineering: ranked ninth.
- Instrument Sciences and Technology: ranked tenth.
- Automation Science and Engineering: ranked tenth.
- Chemical Engineering: ranked tenth.

Note: According to the ranking's classification of academic disciplines, BIT was evaluated in about 20 disciplines.

== Library ==
Renovation of the main library was completed in 2006. The state-of-the-art building has an area of 25,509 square meters and is covered by a wireless network. It has a collection of more than 3 million items, including 1.13 million electronic items.

== Press ==
The BIT Press was established in 1985 and has published more than 3,000 books.

== Sport ==
BIT football team is widely considered one of the best in Chinese college soccer. The team won 11 national championships since the formation of Chinese University Football League in 2000. The BIT team also represented Chinese football at the 2003 Summer Universiade Games and the 2005 Summer Universiade Games. BIT football team is also the only university team that has been promoted to the professional Chinese Football Association Jia League.

The Eastern Athletic Field is the home field for Beijing Institute of Technology FC.

== Notable alumni ==
Among the 100,000 BIT alumni there are Fellows of the Chinese Academy of Sciences and Chinese Academy of Engineering, officials with rank higher than provincial governor and generals of the Chinese military.

=== Politicians ===
- Li Peng, former Premier and Chairman of the National People's Congress (NPC) of China
- Ni Zhifu, former Vice Chairman of the National People's Congress
- Ye Xuanping, vice-president of the Chinese People's Political Consultative Conference (CPPCC). Former Governor of Guangdong
- Zeng Qinghong, former vice-president of China
- Zou Jiahua, former Vice-Premier of the China

=== Scientists ===
- Wang Xiaomo, Winner of The State Preeminent Science and Technology Award of China, and also the only one attended college after 1949 among all winners till 2014, Father of Chinese Airborne early warning and control system.
- Huang Chunping, Director of Rocket System for the Shenzhou 5 Spacecraft.
- Peng Shilu, "Father of Chinese Nuclear Submarine".

== See also ==
- Project 985
