= Huang Chunping =

- 黄春平
- Born: 1938 (age 87–88); Minhou County, Fujian, China
- Education: Beijing Institute of Technology
- Spouse: Zhang Yonggui
- Scientific career
- Fields: Aerospace engineering Missile
- Workplaces: China Academy of Launch Vehicle Technology

Chinese name
- Simplified Chinese: 黄春平
- Traditional Chinese: 黃春平
Transcriptions
Standard Mandarin
- Hanyu Pinyin: Huáng Chūnpíng

Huang Chunping (born 1938) is a Chinese scientist in the fields of missile and aerospace engineering. He was the commander in chief of the Shenzhou 5 rocket system, China's first crewed spacecraft. He was also the commander in chief of Long March 3, Long March 2E and Long March 2F.

== Biography ==
Huang was born into a peasant family in the town of Xiangqian, Minhou County, Fujian, in 1938. He is the seventh child in the family. All his six elder sisters were drowned by his father. He has two younger sisters and one younger brother. His father died when he was 16. He secondary studied at Minhou No.2 High School. After graduating from Beijing Institute of Technology in 1964, he was despatched to the 1st Branch of the 5th Academy of the Ministry of National Defense (now China Academy of Launch Vehicle Technology), where he successively served as technician, engineering group leader, office director, deputy director, director of Comprehensive Planning Department, director of Military Product Research and Production Department, assistant to president, deputy president, deputy director of Science and Technology Commission, chief designer, deputy chief designer, chief and deputy commander in chief. On 18 October 2019, Huang founded the Zhongxing Aerospace Information Technology Co., Ltd. in Fuzhou.

== Personal life ==
Huang married Zhang Yonggui, who is also a space engineer.
