= Meishi Film Academy =

Film school of Chongqing University

The Meishi Film Academy (Chinese: 重庆大学美视电影学院) is one of 28 schools in Chongqing University, the second film academy founded in the People's Republic of China after the Beijing Film Academy. It was co-built by Chongqing University and the Hong Kong Meishi Electric Power Group and is certified by the Chinese Ministry of Education. At present, the Meishi Film Academy has nearly 700 undergraduates, 21 graduates, and more than 50 full-time professors. Zhang Yimou is one of the visiting professors of the academy.
