= Xuanwu, Nanjing =

Xuanwu 玄武区
- District
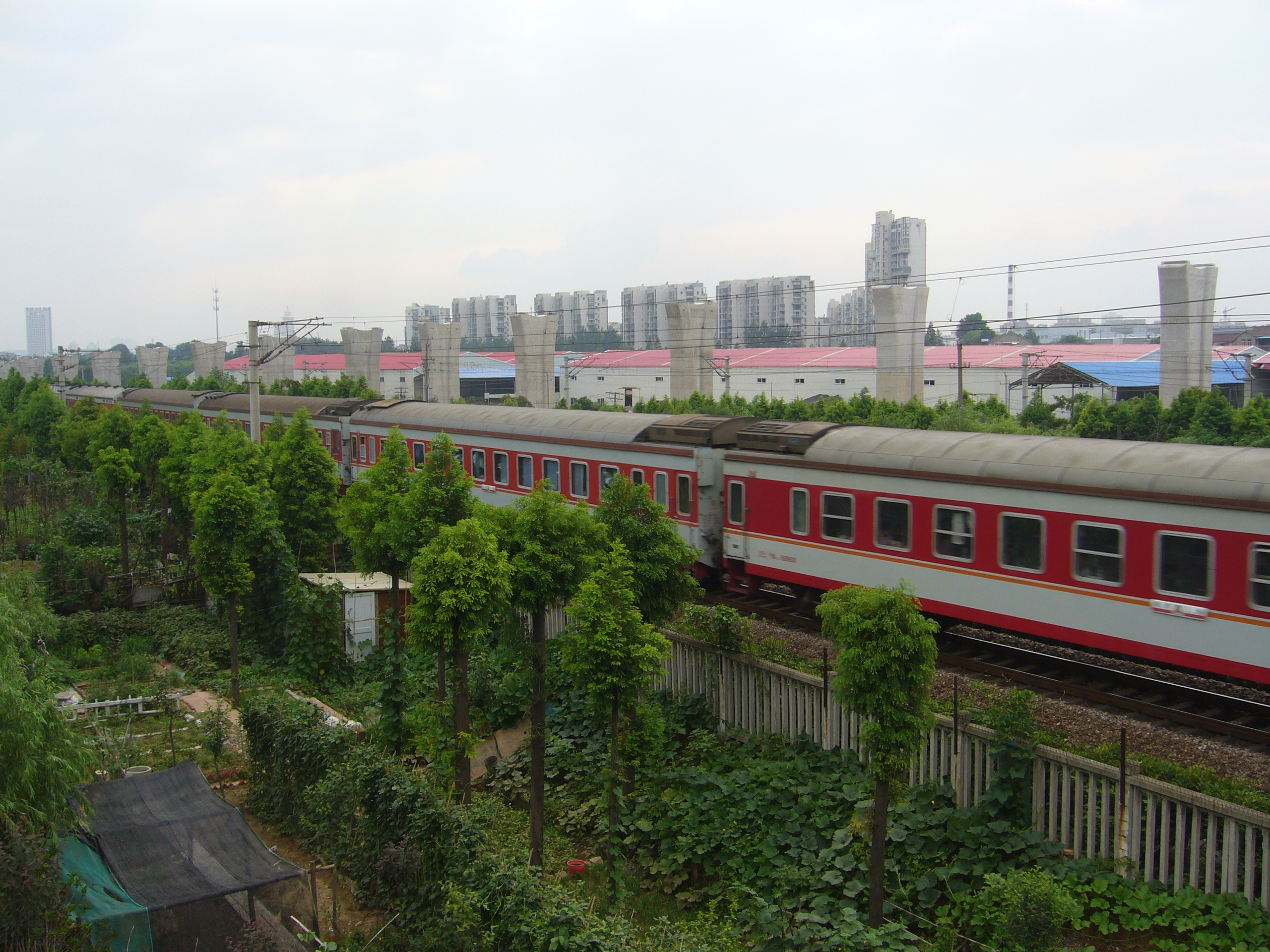

- Location in Jiangsu
- Coordinates: 32°03′36″N 118°50′54″E
- Country: People's Republic of China
- Province: Jiangsu
- Sub-provincial city: Nanjing

Area
  - Total: 81 km^{2} (31 sq mi)

Population (2020 census)
  - Total: 537,825
  - Density: 6,600/km^{2} (17,000/sq mi)
- Time zone: UTC+8 (China Standard)
- Postal code: 210002 - 210018
Nanjing district map
Subdivisions of Nanjing, Jiangsu
City Proper
1	Xuanwu
2	Qinhuai
3	Jianye
4	Gulou
5	Yuhuatai
6	Qixia
Suburban
7	Jiangning
8	Pukou
9	Luhe
Rural
10	Lishui
11	Gaochun

Xuanwu District (Chinese: 玄武区; pinyin: Xuánwǔ Qū) is one of 11 districts of Nanjing, the capital of Jiangsu province, China. Xuanwu District is an urban centre located in the north-eastern part of Nanjing. It is the seat of the Nanjing Municipal Government.

== Administrative subdivisions ==
Xuanwu has administrative jurisdiction over the following 7 subdistricts:

Name	Chinese (S)	Hanyu Pinyin	Population (2010)	Area (km^{2})
Meiyuanxincun Subdistrict	梅园新村街道	Méiyuán Xīncūn Jiēdào	107,395	6.35
Xinjiekou Subdistrict	新街口街道	Xīnjiēkǒu Jiēdào	93,906	2.6
Xuanwumen Subdistrict	玄武门街道	Xuánwǔmén Jiēdào	41,993	6
Suojincun Subdistrict	锁金村街道	Suǒjīncūn Jiēdào	76,063	6
Hongshan Subdistrict	红山街道	Hóngshān Jiēdào	88,217	6.9
Xiaolingwei Subdistrict	孝陵卫街道	Xiàolíngwèi Jiēdào	112,654	30
Xuanwuhu Subdistrict	玄武湖街道	Xuánwǔhú Jiēdào	69,739	11.6

- Defunct - Houzaimen Subdistrict (后宰门街道) merged into Meiyuan Xincun in 2012

== Economy ==
The main industries in the district are: leisure and tourism, information technology, retail, and services. Its economy is primarily based upon the delivery of services. Industry zones include the Changjiang Road Cultural Area, Xinjiekou Central Economic Area, and Xuzhuang Software Industry Base. The district has attracted multi-national corporations, such as 3M, American Express, Siemens, Hyundai, Samsung, NYK Line, and Cathay Life Insurance.

== Education ==
There are more than 40 colleges, universities, and research institutes in the district, including Southeast University, Nanjing University of Science and Technology, Nanjing Agricultural University, Nanjing Forestry University, and Jiangsu Academy of Agricultural Sciences. There are about 35 academics from the Chinese Academy of Engineering and Chinese Academy of Sciences there, which represent about 50% of the academics from those academies in Jiangsu Province.

Xuanwu is also home to the People's Liberation Army Navy of China Command College, which trains naval officers, and is located near the Nanjing Museum.

== Transportation ==
Transportation within the district includes Line 1 and Line 2 of the Nanjing Metro, which has stations within the district. Other sources of transportation that are 20 or more minutes from the district are the Nanjing Railway Station, Shanghai-Nanjing Railway, and Nanjing Lukou Airport.

== Attractions ==
The scenic Xuanwu District is also known for its tourists attractions like the Sun Yat-sen Mausoleum, Xuanwu Lake, and the Hongwu Emperor's Mausoleum, which is listed as one of the Imperial Tombs of the Ming and Qing Dynasties that are listed as a UNESCO World Heritage Site. The district has more than 58 percent green cover. Xuanwu is also home of the presidential residence of Chiang Kai-shek.

Adjacent to Xuanwu Lake is the Nanjing International Exhibition Center.
