= Jiang Lan (scientist) =

Chinese scientist and university administrator

- 姜澜

President of Beijing Institute of Technology
- Incumbent
- Assumed office 30 April 2024
- Party Secretary: Zhang Jun (张军)
- Preceded by: Long Teng

Personal details
- Born: July 1972 (age 54) Zigong, Sichuan, China
- Party: Chinese Communist Party
- Education: Beijing Institute of Technology; Tokyo University of Agriculture and Technology; Missouri University of Science and Technology
- Scientific career
- Fields: Laser manufacturing
- Workplaces: Beijing Institute of Technology

Chinese name
- Simplified Chinese: 姜澜
- Traditional Chinese: 姜瀾
Transcriptions
Standard Mandarin
- Hanyu Pinyin: Jiāng Lán

Jiang Lan (Chinese: 姜澜; born July 1972) is a Chinese scientist and university administrator who is the current president of Beijing Institute of Technology, and an academician of the Chinese Academy of Sciences.

== Biography ==
Jiang was born in Zigong, Sichuan, in July 1972. He attended Zigong No.1 High School. After graduating from Beijing Institute of Technology in 1995, he was sent to study at Tokyo University of Agriculture and Technology on government scholarships. In 2000, he was a postdoctoral fellow at Missouri University of Science and Technology. He worked at the university after graduation.

Jiang returned to China in 2006 and that same year became professor at Beijing Institute of Technology. He was deputy director of the Machinery and Transportation Department in 2009. In 2012, he was appointed deputy dean of the Machinery and Vehicles School, rising to dean in 2015. He served as vice president of the university in November 2022, and in April 2024 was promoted to the president position.

== Honours and awards ==
- 2016 State Natural Science Award (Second Class) for basic research on the mechanism, methods, and new material preparation of ultrafast laser micro nano manufacturing.
- 2017 Science and Technology Progress Award of the Ho Leung Ho Lee Foundation
- 2018 Fellow of the American Society of Mechanical Engineers (ASME)
- 2018 Fellow of the Optical Society of America (OSA)
- 2018 Fellow of the International Society for Nanomanufacturing (ISNM)
- November 2023 Member of the Chinese Academy of Sciences (CAS)

Educational offices
Preceded by Long Teng	President of Beijing Institute of Technology; 2024–present	Incumbent
