= Plan 111 =

China's higher education development project initiated in 2006

The Higher Education Institution Academic Discipline Innovation and Talent Introduction Plan (高等学校学科创新引智计划), best known as Plan 111 and Project 111 (Chinese: 111计划), is a higher education development project initiated in 2006 by the Ministry of Education and the State Administration of Foreign Experts Affairs to establish innovation centers for the purposes of technology transfer. In 2005, the Ministry of Education announced the creation of 100 innovation centers as part of the plan. The plan aimed to bring in about 1,000 overseas experts from the top 100 universities and research institutes worldwide.

With the conclusion of "Project 985" and "Project 211" and the cessation of new university inclusion plans, "Project 111" gradually faded from public view between 2015 and 2017. Although it still exists as a special project, and has even expanded somewhat, the core of China's higher education development policy has effectively shifted to the "Double First-Class" initiative.

Compared to the still influential "Project 985" and "Project 211," "Project 111" has received significantly less public attention. This is partly due to the project's own overexpansion, similar to the current societal evaluation of the "Double First-Class" initiative, which has diminished its uniqueness. Furthermore, the rise of Chinese universities' global influence in the late 2020s, and the significant progress made through other means in research capabilities and international cooperation indicators, have rendered the project's initial goals seem outdated.

== See also ==
- Thousand Talents Program (China)
- State Key Laboratory
- Double First Class University Plan
- Project 985
- 863 Program
- Science and technology in China
