= Chongqing University =

Public university in Chongqing, China

Coordinates: 29°33′54″N 106°28′08″E

- 重庆大学
- Motto: 耐劳苦, 尚俭朴, 勤学业, 爱国家
- Motto in English: Endure Toil, Cherish Thrift, Work Hard and Love the Country
- Type: National Public
- Established: 1929; 97 years ago
- Affiliations: Excellence League; Double First-Class Construction; 211 Project; 985 Project; Association of MBAs; AACSB; EQUIS; University Alliance in Chongqing (UAC)
- President: Dr. Zhang, Zongyi
- Faculty: 5,200
- Students: 50,000
- Undergraduates: 28,000
- Postgraduates: 21,000
- Location: Chongqing, China
- Campus: Three campuses (A, B, C) downtown, one campus (Huxi) in suburbs, total 347 hectares
- Colors: BlueRed
- Website: cqu.edu.cn

Chinese name
- Simplified Chinese: 重庆大学
- Traditional Chinese: 重慶大學
Transcriptions
Standard Mandarin
- Hanyu Pinyin: Chóngqìng dàxué

Chongqing University (CQU; 重庆大学) is a public university in Chongqing, China. It is affiliated with the Ministry of Education of China. The university is part of Project 211, Project 985, and the Double First-Class Construction.

Chongqing University is especially highly recognized in Architecture, Electrical Engineering, Civil Engineering, Mechanical Engineering, Metallurgical Engineering, and Management Science. According to Academic Ranking of World Universities 2024, CQU is ranked 151-200 in the world.

== History ==
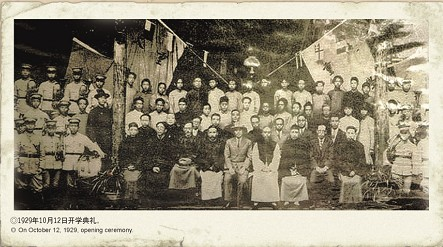
Opening ceremony on October 12, 1929

Chongqing University was founded in 1929, when some professors born in Chongqing, working at Chengdu University, decided to found a new University in Chongqing. The university was founded with the help of General Liu Xiang, whose involvement resulted in the founding of the Chongqing University Preparatory Committee. On October 12, the first term of Chongqing University began, and the Chongqing University Preparatory Committee published the "Chongqing University Founding Declaration", which declared talents and education to be the driving force of the country and the world's development.

In 1937, the Capital Nanjing was occupied. The Chinese government ordered that all agencies move to Chongqing and continue resisting Japanese aggression. This order resulted in the relocation of the National Central University to Chongqing, where it was given 200 mu of land by Chongqing University, and a cooperative relationship was established between the two universities. During this period, many distinguished professors taught at both universities, contributing significantly to the academic environment. These included notable figures such as Li Siguang, a renowned geologist; Xu Beihong, a famous painter and art educator; Wu Guanzhong, an accomplished painter and art educator; Ma Yinchu, an influential economist and educator; He Lu, a prominent physicist; and Lu Zuofu, a distinguished literary scholar. This era of collaboration not only strengthened the academic capabilities of both universities but also played a crucial role in preserving and advancing China's educational and cultural institutions amidst the challenges of war.

In 1942, Chongqing University became a national comprehensive university consisting of six colleges in liberal arts, science, engineering, law, and medicine.

In 1952, the nationwide restructuring of higher education turned Chongqing University into an engineering-orientated multi-disciplinary university under the State Ministry of Education. In 1960, Chongqing University was designated as one of the first key national universities. Since the implementation of reform and opening-up policy in China, Chongqing University has stressed the development of disciplines like humanities, business management, art, and sports education, and has further sped up the process of developing the university into a comprehensive institution of higher learning.

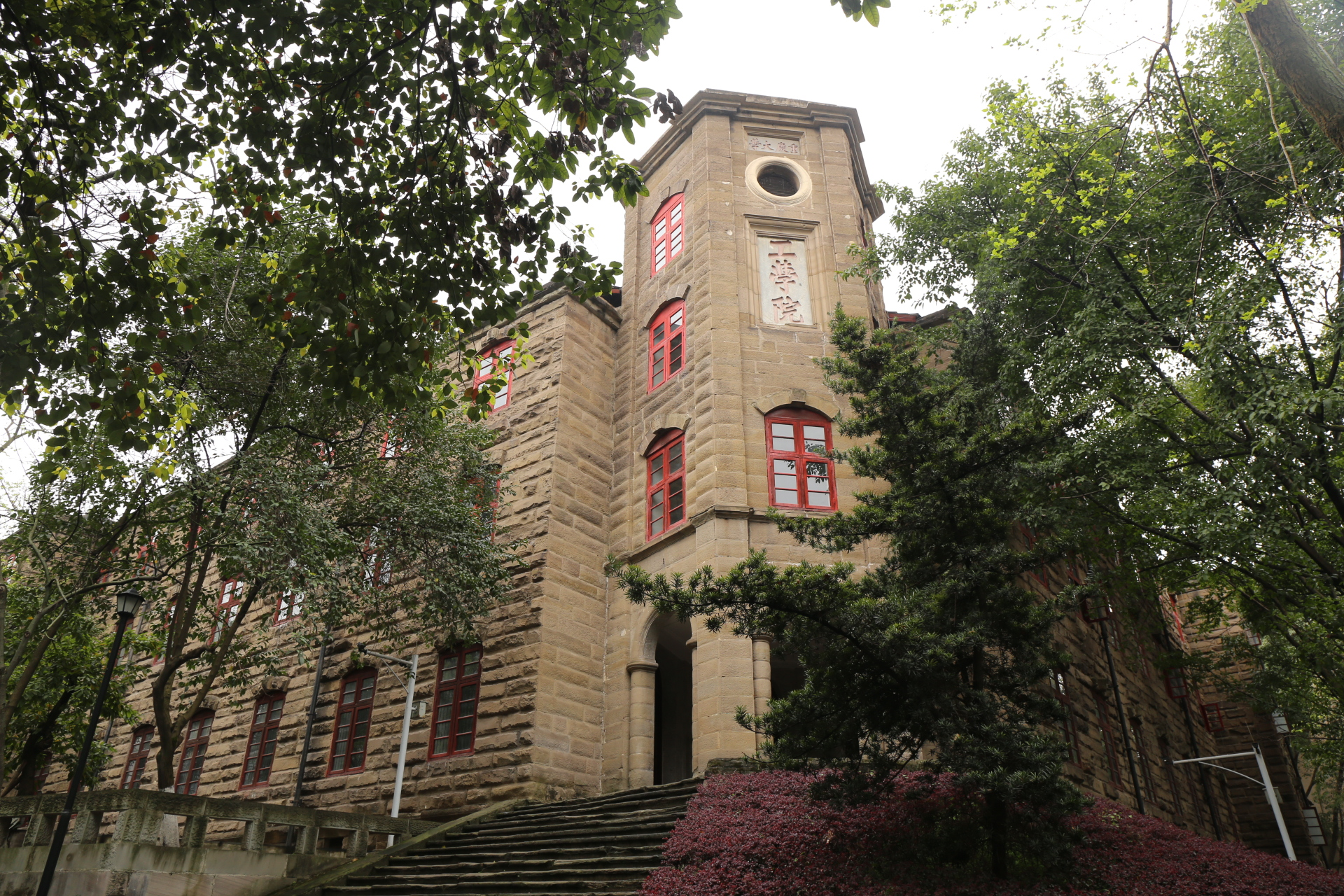
College of Engineering Building

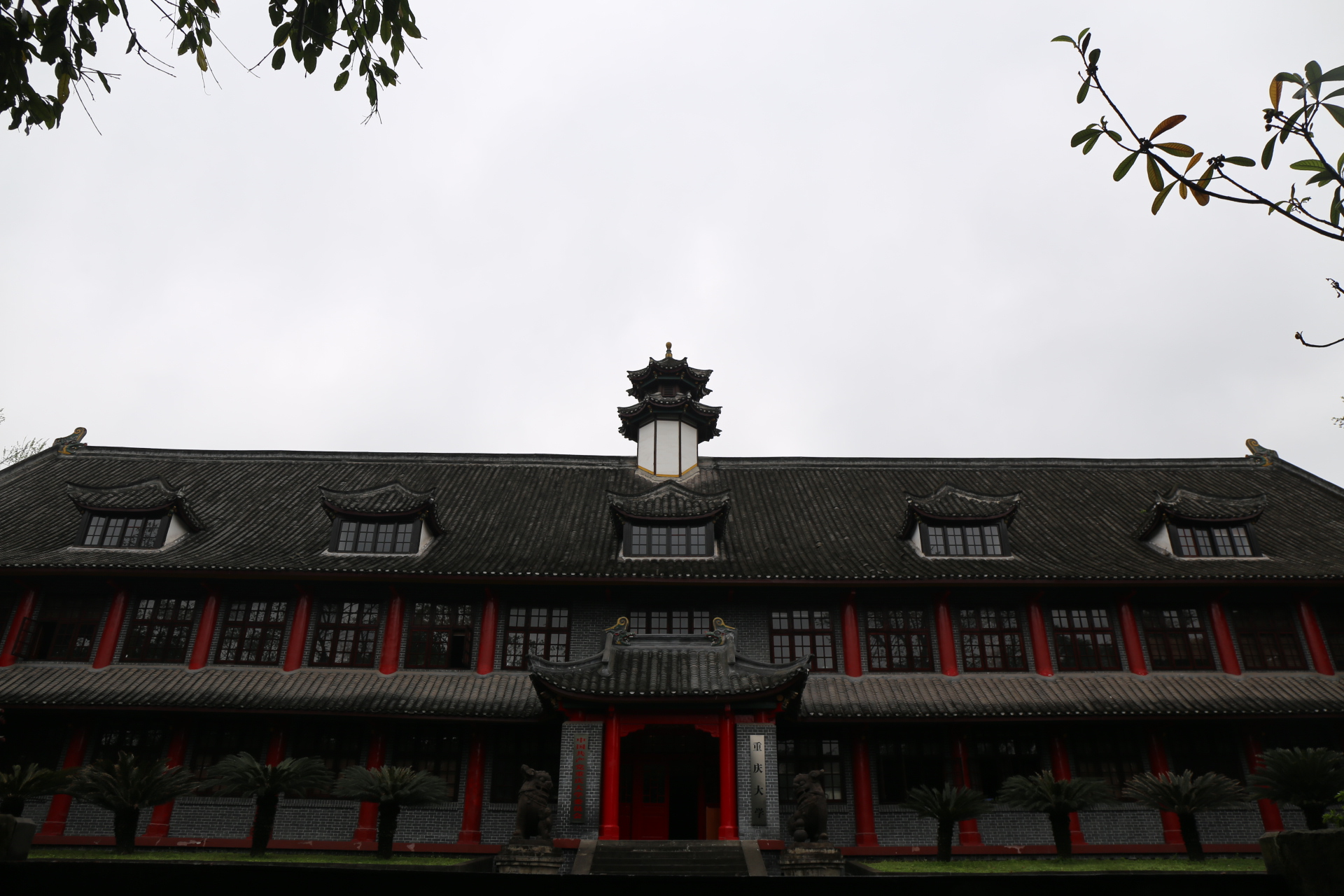
College of Science Building

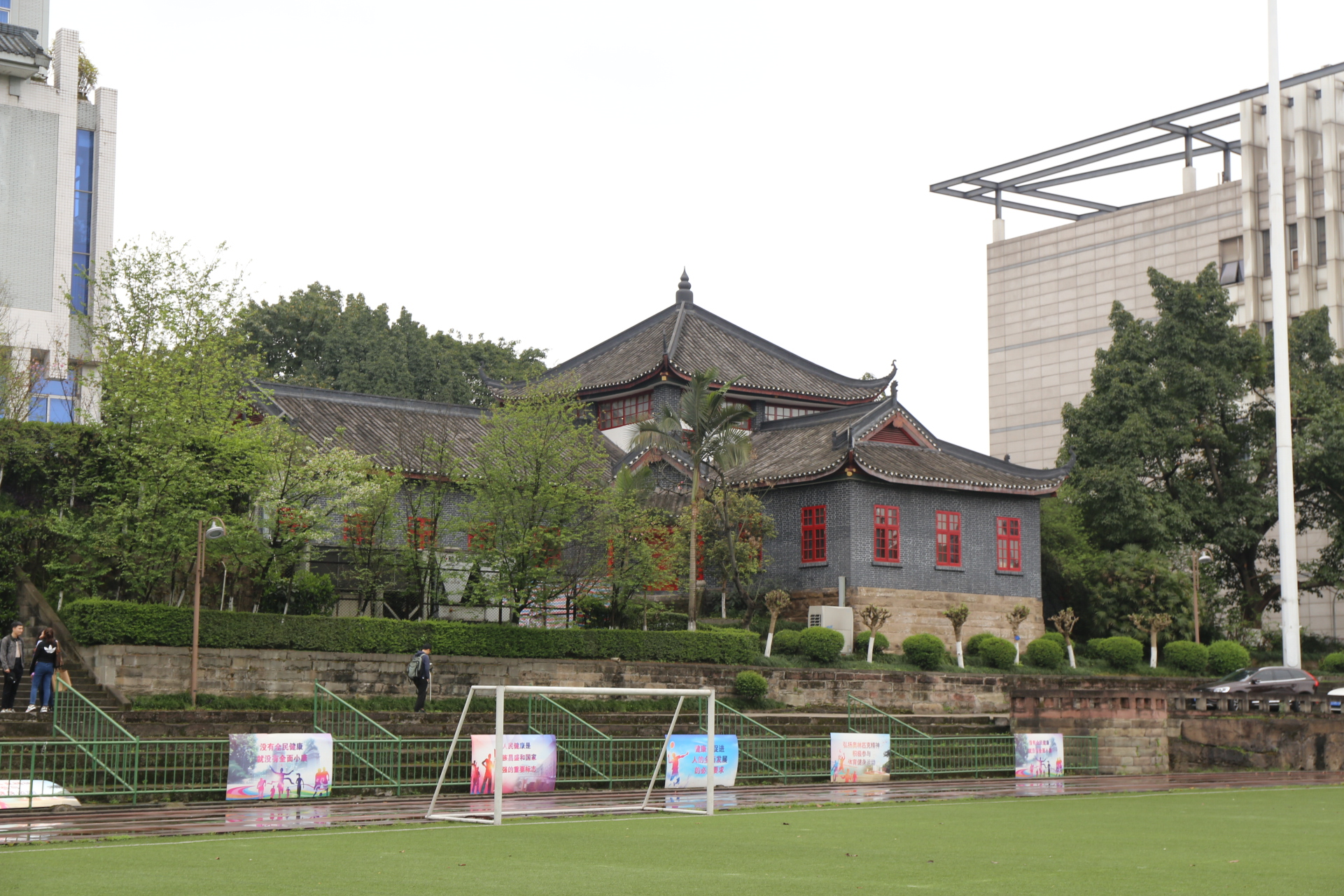
Library

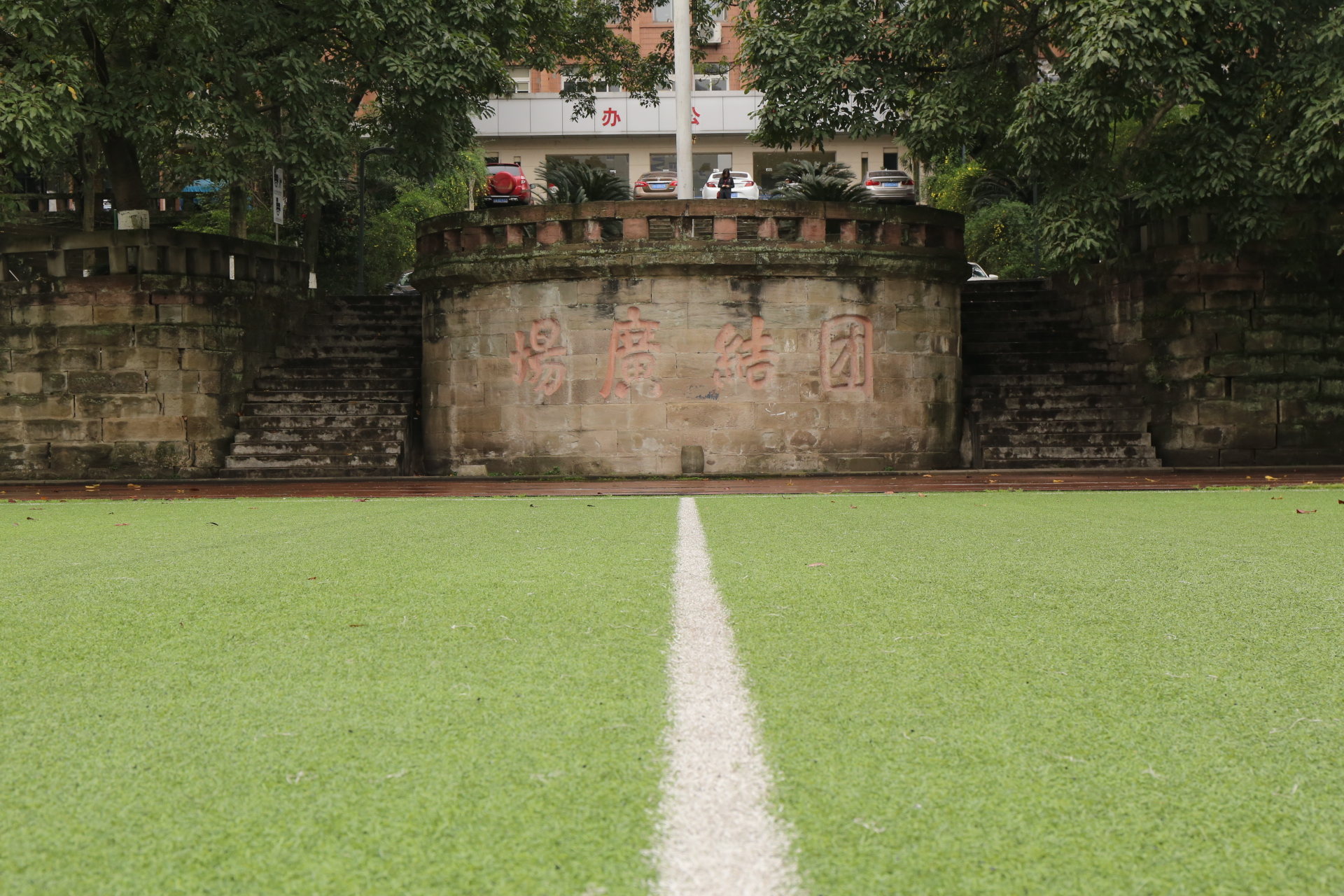
Tuanjie Square

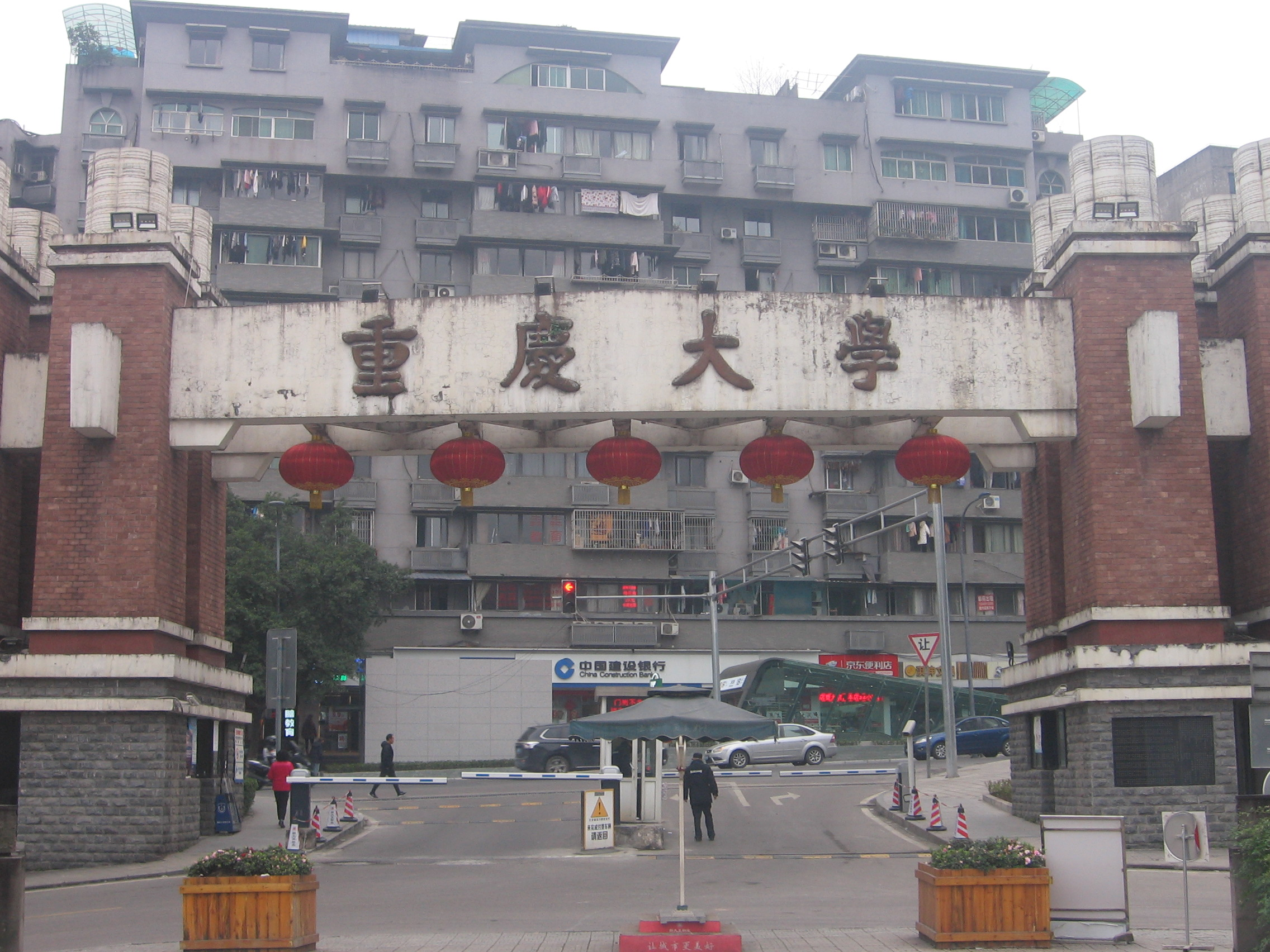
Main Entrance

=== Present ===
Chongqing University has 28 schools plus the graduate school, the City College of Science and Technology, the College of Continuing Education, and the College of Online Education. The university now has a total enrollment of 50,000 students, of which 20,000 are master's and doctoral students, and 30,000 are undergraduate students. The university owns 24 mobile workstations for postdoctoral study, 133 doctoral programs, 256 master programs, 18 professional master's degree programs, namely MBA, EMBA, MPA, master of engineering, and 89 bachelor's degree programs in 8 academic categories of science, engineering, liberal arts, economics, management, law, agriculture and education.

Currently, the university has a total number of 5,400 faculty and staff members, including 2,700 full-time faculty, 3 members of the Chinese Academy of Engineering, 12 contracted members from other institutions, 6 members of the Subject Evaluation Team of the Academic Degree Committee under the State Council, 4 chief scientists of National 973 Projects, 4 state-level "young experts with distinguished contribution", 500 doctorate supervisors, 1,700 full professors and associate professors.

Chongqing University covers a total area of 367 hectares (910 acres), with 1.60 million square meters of construction space. In 2001, Chongqing University Technology Park came into being, as one of the 22 state-level university technology parks in China.

== Academics ==
=== Academic organisation ===
Faculty of Arts and Sciences

- Institute for Advanced Studies in Humanities and Social Sciences
- Liberal Arts College
- School of Economics and Business Administration
- School of Public Affairs
- School of Foreign Language
- School of Arts
- School of Journalism and Communication
- Law School
- Meishi Film Academy
- School of Chemistry and Chemical Engineering
- School of Bioengineering
- School of Physics
- School of Mathematics and Statistics
- School of Physical Education
- School of Life Sciences

Faculty of the Built Environment

- School of Architecture and Urban Planning
- School of Civil Engineering
- College of Environmental and Ecology
- School of Construction Management and Real Estate

Faculty of Engineering

- School of Mechanical Engineering
- School of Electrical Engineering
- School of Power and Energy Engineering
- School of Material Science and Engineering
- School of Resources and Environmental Science
- School of Aerospace Engineering
- Chongqing University and University of Cincinnati Joint Cooperative Institute(JCI)

Faculty of Information Science and Technology

- School of Computer Science
- School of Automation
- School of Communication Engineering
- School of Opto-Electronic Engineering
- School of Software Engineering

Other

- International School (College of International Education)
- City College of Science and Technology
- College of Continuing Education
- College of Networking Education

=== Teaching and research ===
Chongqing University is in possession of 17 state key subjects and 14 key subjects under the state "211 Project", 38 provincial or ministerial key subjects. The university sets up 14 specially appointed professor posts under the "Yangtze River Scholar Award Program". It has established 3 national teaching bases for fundamental courses and a national quality education base for college students, 9 national key labs and ministerial key labs, 71 provincial key labs, and 130 labs of different specialties. Moreover, Chongqing University has constructed the distance education center, multi-media classrooms of large scale and interactive audio-visual classrooms, labs or training centers in cooperation with world-famous enterprises such as Siemens, Microsoft, IBM, Rockwell, Omron, etc. The university has a national key publishing house, a national first-class architectural designing institute, and a first-class institute for planning and design.

In recent years, the university has undertaken over 100 national key scientific projects of different types, and won 13 National Awards for Invention, 40 Awards for Scientific and Technological Advancement, 4 Awards for Natural Science, 968 ministerial and provincial awards, 283 Awards for Teaching Achievement.

=== Rankings ===
University rankings
BCUR National	Domestic	34
Wu Shulian National	Domestic	27
CUAA National	Alumni	33
QS National	General	=33
THE National	General	30–33
QS Asia (Asia version)	General	187
THE Asia (Asia version)	General	80
ARWU World	Research	151–200
QS World	General	=504
THE World	General	351–400
USNWR World	General	202

Top ranked disciplines in China

National rank	Major
4	Mining Engineering
4	Urban Planning
5	Architecture
5	Industrial Engineering
5	Electrical Engineering
5	Instrumentation Science and Technology
6	Bio Medical Engineering
6	Metallurgical Engineering
7	Landscape Architecture
8	Mechanical Engineering
10	Civil Engineering
11	Safety Science and Engineering
11	Software Engineering
13	Theater and Film Art
14	Topography
16	Law
17	Business Management
18	Public Management
18	Power Engineering
19	Chemical Engineering
19	Management Science and Engineering
20	Computer Science and Technology

=== Library collections ===
The university library is well equipped with modern facilities and a collection of 3.90 million volumes, 6000 kinds of Chinese and foreign periodicals, and 2.0 million volumes of E-books. In addition it has 5 electronic reading rooms with 65,000 e-books and journals. The China Education Research Network (CERNET) Chongqing Central Node is set up in the library.

=== Key laboratories ===
State Key Laboratories(Engineering Centers)

- Mechanical Transmission
- Power Transmission and Distribution Equipment and Systems Safety, and New Technology
- Tech R&D Center for Magnesium Alloy Engineering
- New Micro-Nano Devices and System Technology
- International R&D Center for Micro-Nano System and New Materials Technology

Key Laboratories of the Ministry of Education of China

- Opto-electronic Technology and Systems
- China Southwest Resource Exploitation and Environmental Disaster Control Engineering
- The Three Gorges Reservoir Region's Eco-Environment
- Center for Supervising, Inspecting and Testing Transgenic Biological Product Ingredients
- Upland Urban Construction and New Technology (under construction)
- Center for Industrial CT Non-destructive testing Engineering (under construction)

Discipline Innovation Bases for Higher

- Education("111 Project")
- Innovative Base of Biological Mechanics and Tissue-Repair Engineering
- Innovative Base of Power Transforming and Transmission Equipments and System Safety Technology

Provincial Key Laboratories

- Manufacturing System Engineering
- High Voltage Technology and System Information Monitoring
- Biomedical Engineering
- Metallurgical Engineering
- New Technology in Electrical Engineering
- Software Engineering
- Exploitation of Mineral Resources and Environmental Damages and Engineering Disasters in the Three Gorges Reservoir Region
- Automation Engineering
- Thermal Engineering
- Rock and Soil Engineering
- Material Physics Building Environment and Installation Engineering
- Carrier Test and Monitoring and Remote Sensing Information Transmission Technology
- New Building Materials and Engineering
- Pollution Prevention and Waste Recycling Architectural Technology
- Municipal and Environment Engineering

== Campus ==
Chongqing University covers a total area of over 3.65 square kilometres, consisting of four campuses. With green mountains surrounded and the Jialing River flowing by, the four campuses are set amidst sceneries and awarded the title of "Garden University" by Chongqing Municipality.

== Outreach and cooperation ==
It has established inter-university exchange links with over 100 institutions of higher education in 20 countries such as the USA, England, France, Germany, Italy, Canada, Australia, the Netherlands, Japan, South Korea, Russia, etc.

== Alumni ==
Chongqing University has many notable alumni including:

- Ren Zhengfei, Founder and President of Huawei
- Li Xiaohong, President of Chinese Academy of Engineering (CAE) and President of Wuhan University
- Yan Su, Lyricist
- Chou Wen-chung, Chinese-American Composer of Contemporary Classical Music
- Li Shangfu, China Minister of National Defense

== See also ==
- Meishi Film Academy
