= Big Four Institutes of Technology =

Chinese technical education establishments

- Simplified Chinese: 四大工学院
- Traditional Chinese: 四大工學院
Transcriptions

The Big Four Institutes of Technology (simplified Chinese: 四大工学院; traditional Chinese: 四大工學院) are four institutes of technology after the national adjustment of colleges in 1950s.

== List of 4 Institutes ==
Institute	Location	Period	Renamed
Dalian Institute of Technology	Dalian	1950–1988	Dalian University of Technology
South China Institute of Technology	Guangzhou	1952–1988	South China University of Technology
Nanjing Institute of Technology	Nanjing	1952–1988	Southeast University
Huazhong Institute of Technology	Wuhan	1953–1988	Huazhong University of Science and Technology
