= Xiaolingwei =

Xiaolingwei 孝陵卫街道
- Subdistrict
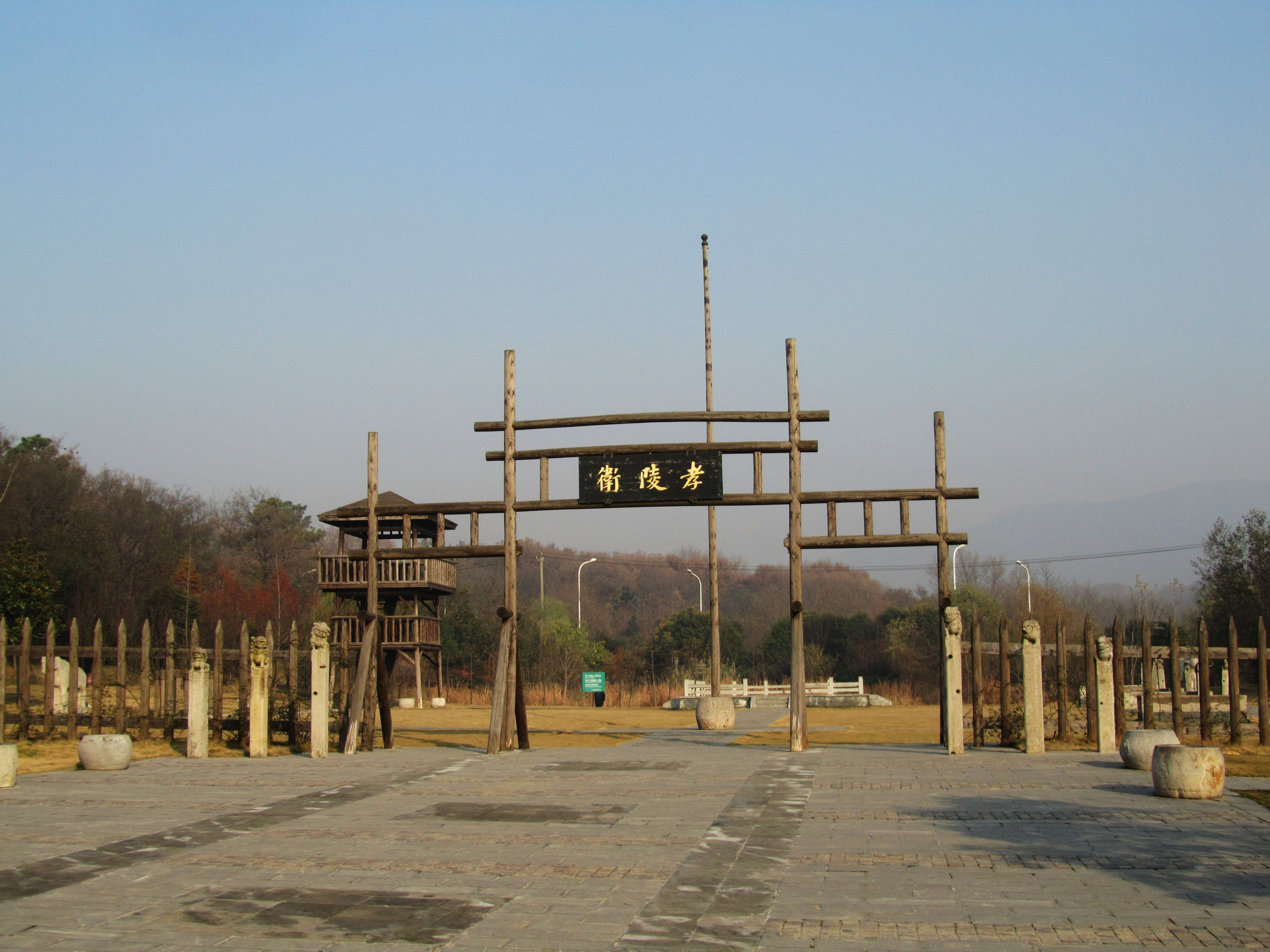

- Location in Jiangsu
- Coordinates: 32.0358°N 118.8554°E
- Country: People's Republic of China
- Province: Jiangsu
- Prefecture-level city: Nanjing
- District: Xuanwu
- Time zone: UTC+8 (China Standard)

Xiaolingwei (Chinese: 孝陵卫) is a subdistrict located in Jiangsu, China, near Nanjing. It is at the south of Nanjing's Zhongshan Gate and southeast of the eponymous Ming Dynasty imperial tombs of Nanjing (Xiao Mausoleum). The subdistrict has a population of 66,031, making it the 35th largest subdistrict in Jiangsu. It operates on China Standard Time, the same as the rest of China. It is 14 metres (46 ft) above sea level.

Xiaolingwei is 227 kilometres (141 mi) from Shanghai and 888 kilometres (552 mi) from Beijing.
