= Harbin Engineering University =

Public university in Harbin, Heilongjiang, China

Coordinates: 45°46′20″N 126°40′30″E

- 哈尔滨工程大学
- Former names: PLA Military Engineering Institute (1953–1966); Harbin Engineering College (1966–1970); Harbin Shipbuilding Engineering Institute (1970–1994)
- Motto: 大工至善，大學至真
- Motto in English: "Pursue perfection in engineering, pursue truth in learning"
- Type: Public
- Established: September 1, 1953; 72 years ago
- Chairman: Song Yingdong (宋迎东)
- President: Yin Jingwei (殷敬伟)
- Academic staff: 1,793
- Students: 29,422 (2023)
- Undergraduates: c. 16,400 (2023)
- Postgraduates: c. 8,000 (2023)
- Location: Harbin, Heilongjiang, China
- Campus: Urban, 1.26 square kilometres (311.4 acres)
- Website: hrbeu.edu.cn

Chinese name
- Simplified Chinese: 哈尔滨工程大学
- Traditional Chinese: 哈爾濱工程大學
Transcriptions
Standard Mandarin
- Hanyu Pinyin: Hārbīn Gōngchéng Dàxué

Harbin Engineering University (HEU; 哈尔滨工程大学) is a public research university in Harbin, Heilongjiang, China, focused on engineering disciplines including shipbuilding, marine technology, and nuclear applications. It is affiliated with the Ministry of Industry and Information Technology (MIIT), and co-funded by the MIIT, the Ministry of Education, the Heilongjiang Provincial People's Government, the Harbin Municipal People's Government, and the People's Liberation Army Navy. The university is part of the Double First-Class Construction initiative (with naval architecture and ocean engineering designated for world-class development) and Project 211, and is one of the "Seven Sons of National Defence".

Founded on 1 September 1953 as the PLA Military Engineering Institute to support China's early defense development, the university evolved into the Harbin Shipbuilding Engineering Institute in 1970 before adopting its current name in 1994. The university hosts over 55 undergraduate programs and is particularly known for its vessel engineering industries; it ranks second worldwide in marine/ocean engineering in the ShanghaiRanking Global Ranking of Academic Subjects.

== History ==
=== Military origins (1953–1970) ===
HEU traces its origins to the People's Liberation Army Military Engineering Institute, established in Harbin on 1 September 1953 under the direct oversight of the Central Military Commission. Senior General Chen Geng served as the institute's first president. The institute was initially organized into five departments—air force, artillery, navy, armored forces, and engineering corps—modeled on Soviet military academies. The Department of Naval Engineering, founded in 1953, was the direct precursor to the university's core disciplines and trained engineers for warship design, propulsion systems, and submarine development. In 1961 the institute was designated a national key university. From 1960 to 1962 several departments were relocated to other cities (the artillery department to Nanjing, later becoming Nanjing University of Science and Technology; the armored forces department to Xi'an, etc.). In April 1966, by decision of the Central Military Commission, the institute was renamed Harbin Engineering College and left the military sequence.

=== Transition to civilian institute (1970–1994) ===
In 1970, following a 1969 decision to disperse parts of the original institute away from the border region, the naval engineering components remaining in Harbin were reorganized as the Harbin Shipbuilding Engineering Institute (HSEI), placed under civilian administration (the Sixth Ministry of Machine Building, later the China State Shipbuilding Corporation) and focused on industrial shipbuilding needs. Most other departments and the university-level administration had been moved inland to Changsha, Hunan Province, where they formed the Changsha Institute of Technology, later the National University of Defense Technology. HSEI began regular enrollment in 1977 and was designated a national key institution in 1978. It received the national accreditation to confer master's degrees and doctorates in 1981, becoming one of the first universities authorized to do so. During the 1970s and 1980s the institute contributed to prototype experimental submarines and hovercraft, advancing China's capabilities in underwater vehicles and air-cushion technologies.

=== Expansion and modern developments (1994–present) ===
In April 1994, HSEI was renamed Harbin Engineering University. In 1996 the university passed the pre-assessment of Project 211 and became one of its first-batch institutions. In 2017 the university was incorporated into the Double First-Class Construction initiative, with naval architecture and ocean engineering designated as a world-class discipline. In September 2021, the first phase of the Qingdao Innovation and Development Base—spanning 370,000 square meters—was completed and launched to support applied research and international collaboration. On 12 September 2025, Song Yingdong was appointed CPC Committee Secretary and Yin Jingwei was appointed president.

On 23 May 2020, the United States Department of Commerce added Harbin Engineering University to the Entity List of the U.S. Export Administration Regulations for its support of China's military procurement.

== Governance and affiliations ==
As a Chinese public university, HEU operates under a hierarchical framework in which the CPC Committee holds ultimate authority over strategic and personnel decisions. The CPC Committee Secretary, Song Yingdong (born 1969, appointed 12 September 2025), oversees party-building and major policy implementation; the president, Yin Jingwei (born 1980, appointed the same day, concurrently CPC Deputy Secretary), directs operational, academic, and resource management. Vice presidents include Han Duanfeng, Yu Zhiwen, Yan Rujian, Zhao Yuxin, and Yin Hang.

HEU is one of the "Seven Sons of National Defence", a group of elite universities subordinate to the MIIT and tasked with prioritizing national defense research and development. Its expertise in shipbuilding, ocean engineering, and marine propulsion directly supports PLA Navy developments, and it serves as a primary talent pipeline for state-owned defense enterprises. The university is a member of the Sino-Russian Association of Technical Universities (中俄工科大学联盟).

== Academics ==
HEU organizes its academic activities across more than 20 colleges, schools, and departments, with primary emphasis on engineering disciplines integral to naval, marine, and nuclear technologies. Core units include the College of Shipbuilding Engineering, College of Power and Energy Engineering, College of Intelligent Systems Science and Engineering, College of Nuclear Science and Technology, College of Underwater Acoustic Engineering, College of Materials Science and Chemical Engineering, and College of Information and Communication Engineering. The university also operates the Yantai Research Institute, the Qingdao Innovation and Development Base, and the South China Sea Research Institute.

The university offers 61 undergraduate majors, 32 first-level master's disciplines, and 15 first-level doctoral disciplines, together with 13 post-doctoral research stations. Its Double First-Class discipline is naval architecture and ocean engineering; it also holds one national key first-level discipline (ship and marine engineering) and one national key second-level discipline (navigation, guidance and control). The faculty numbers approximately 1,793 full-time members, comprising 389 professors, 502 associate professors, and 8 academicians of the Chinese Academy of Sciences or Chinese Academy of Engineering. In terms of ESI rankings, engineering ranks in the global top 1‰, and engineering, materials science, computer science, chemistry, environment/ecology, physics, geosciences, and social sciences general rank in the global top 1%.

As of 2023, total enrollment stood at approximately 29,422 students, including 27,994 domestic students and 1,428 international students. Graduate students number around 8,000, roughly 35% of the total. In the same year the university conferred 4,135 bachelor's degrees, 3,558 master's degrees, and 378 doctoral degrees.

== Research ==
HEU focuses its research on marine power systems (propulsion and energy technologies for naval and civilian vessels), deep-sea engineering (underwater acoustics and robotics), and nuclear safety (reactor simulation and thermal-hydraulics under marine conditions). Key facilities include the Ship Model Towing Tank Laboratory, a 108 m × 7 m × 3.5 m basin equipped for hydrodynamic resistance and wave-making tests; an ocean engineering basin measuring 50 m × 30 m × 10 m used for vortex-induced vibration studies; and the Nuclear Power Simulation Research Center, which provides computational and hardware-in-the-loop platforms for analyzing reactor behavior without on-site operational reactors. The university operates over 40 research organizations and more than 150 laboratories.

National-level platforms include two national key laboratories (the National Key Laboratory of Underwater Acoustic Technology and the National Key Laboratory of Intelligent Marine Vehicle Technology), the National Engineering Laboratory for E-government Modeling and Simulation, and the China–Russia Joint Laboratory for Polar Technology and Equipment under the Belt and Road initiative. Research strengths include submarine technology, underwater robotics, ship stabilization, dynamic positioning, integrated navigation, underwater acoustic positioning, and nuclear power simulation. HEU was the first university in China to pass "dual certification" under the ISO 9000 quality system.

Notable achievements include the Wukong (悟空号) autonomous underwater vehicle, which set a Chinese record dive to 10,896 meters in the Mariana Trench in November 2021 as the country's deepest untethered unmanned submersible; a deep-water high-precision underwater positioning system that supported the Jiaolong, Shenhai Yongshi, and Fendouzhe manned submersible missions (National Technological Invention Award, Second Class; listed among China's top ten university scientific and technological advances); the first Chinese multi-hull search-and-rescue vessel; and core design work on the seventh-generation ultra-deepwater semi-submersible drilling platform and 20,000-TEU container ships. A World Intellectual Property Organization analysis identifies HEU as the top global patent holder in efficient ship design for sea transportation. Since the 13th Five-Year Plan period, the university has undertaken more than 6,200 research projects and won over 160 provincial-level and above science and technology awards.

== Campus ==
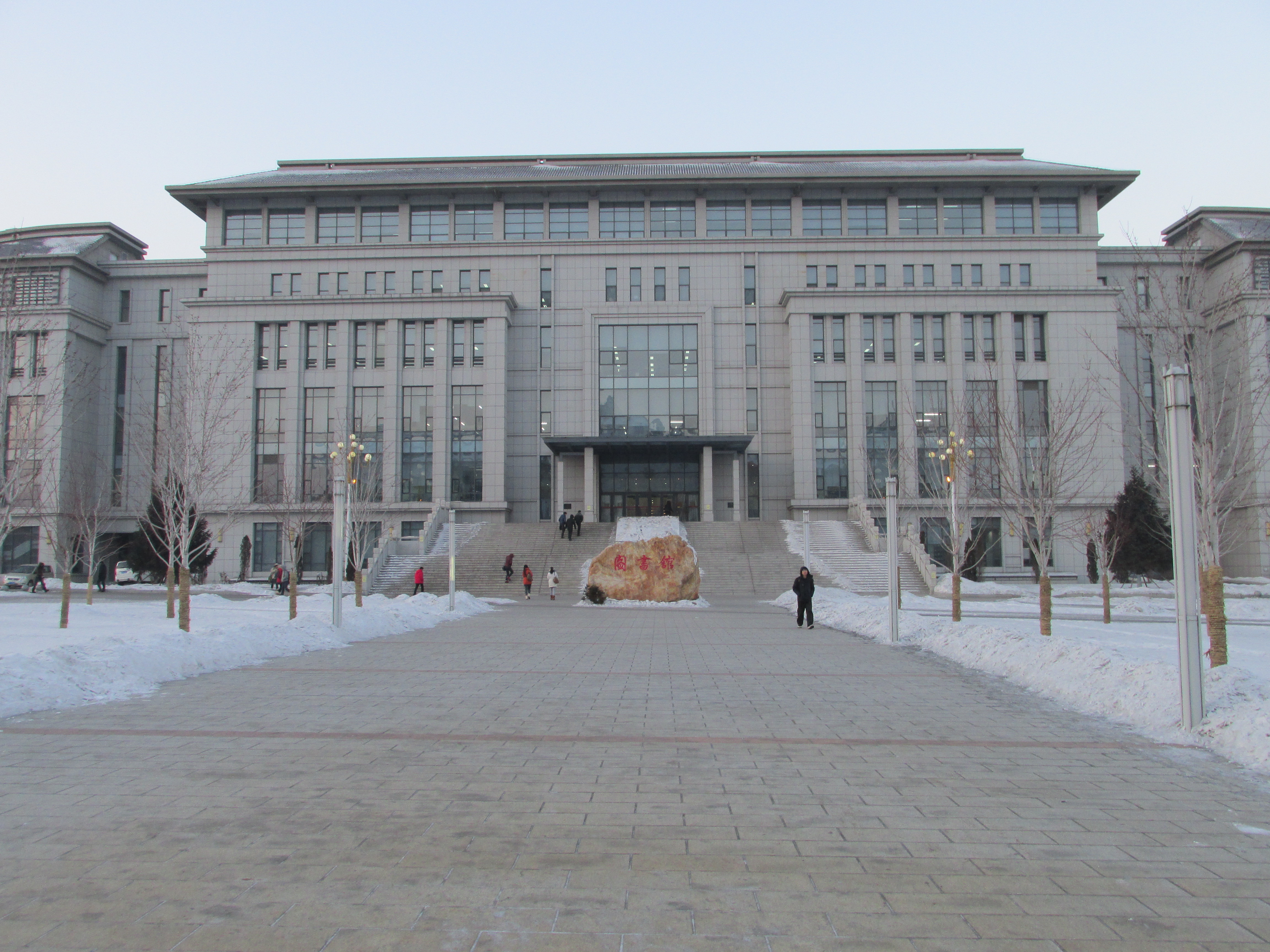
University Library

HEU's main campus is located at 145 Nantong Street in the Nangang District, in the heart of Harbin, covering approximately 1.26 million square meters. The campus is situated within the former military compound, adjacent to the Heilongjiang Military District, and near Harbin Confucian Temple, the Guli Orchard, Cultural Park, and Jile Temple. The university library occupies a six-story building on the eastern side of campus, with a collection of over 7.6 million volumes, with particular strengths in nuclear and marine science. Sports facilities include a gymnasium with a swimming pool and stadium, two 400-meter tracks, and soccer, rugby, tennis, basketball, and volleyball courts.

Beyond Harbin, the university operates the Yantai Research Institute in Yantai's Huangbohai New Area, oriented toward marine and offshore applications, and the Qingdao Innovation and Development Base on Qingdao's West Coast New Area, whose first phase (370,000 square meters) opened in September 2021 to support applied research and international collaboration.

== Admissions ==
Admission to HEU for domestic undergraduates occurs primarily through the Gaokao, China's National College Entrance Examination. In 2024, HEU's minimum admission scores for science-track programs exceeded provincial first-batch undergraduate lines by an average of over 110 points across 30 provinces; in its home province of Heilongjiang the margin was 144 points. For example, in Shandong Province, 2024 scores ranged from 607 (ocean engineering) to 613 (electronic information and software engineering), out of a maximum score of approximately 750.

International students are admitted to select English-taught programs in marine-related fields. The HEU International Student Scholarship covers full tuition for first-class recipients and 50% for second-class recipients; applicants to English-taught programs generally need TOEFL 79 or IELTS 5.5.

== International cooperation ==
HEU emphasizes international cooperation and academic exchange, maintaining partnerships with more than 130 institutions across 30 countries, coordinating visiting scholars and cooperative research. As of 2023, over 1,100 international students from approximately 90 countries were enrolled; the College of International Cooperative Education has cumulatively hosted more than 5,600 students from over 100 countries.

== Rankings and reputation ==
- ShanghaiRanking Global Ranking of Academic Subjects (2024): #2 worldwide in Marine/Ocean Engineering.
- QS World University Rankings 2026: 1001–1200 band overall; QS Asia 2025: 362nd.
- U.S. News & World Report Best Global Universities: 699th globally.
- ShanghaiRanking Best Chinese Universities Ranking: 45th nationally.
- EduRank (2025): 81st among Chinese universities.

Nationally, HEU is a Double First-Class Discipline University and a Project 211 key university. In 2016–2020 it received Outstanding Contribution Awards for high-tech weapon equipment development and for aircraft carrier construction.

== Notable alumni ==
HEU has produced 46 academicians of the Chinese Academy of Sciences or Chinese Academy of Engineering, including Huang Xuhua (chief designer of China's first nuclear submarine), Yang Shi'e (underwater acoustics), Pan Jingfu (naval architecture), Xu Yuru (underwater robotics), Qian Qihu (protective engineering), Wang Zeshan (energetic materials), Ren Xinmin (missile technology), Liang Shoupan (missile technology), Ci Yungui (computer science), and Zhou Xingming (computer science). Military and political alumni include Tang Tianbiao (general), Jin Mao (deputy commander of the PLA Navy), and Yu Zhengsheng (former chairman of the National Committee of the Chinese People's Political Consultative Conference). Business alumni include Wang Jun (chairman of CITIC Group) and Zhou Huan (chairman of Datang Group).

From 2010 to 2018, HEU supplied over 50% of all university-recruited personnel to the China Shipbuilding Industry Corporation (CSIC), the defense-oriented arm of what is now China State Shipbuilding Corporation; alumni staff key roles in designing and building PLA Navy surface combatants and submarines. Alumni of the College of Nuclear Science and Technology have contributed to maritime nuclear propulsion and floating nuclear platform programs under the China National Nuclear Corporation.

== Controversies ==
HEU's close ties to the Chinese defense establishment have drawn international scrutiny. In May 2020 the United States added the university to the Entity List under export control regulations. The Australian Strategic Policy Institute's China Defence Universities Tracker has flagged HEU among institutions linked to technology-acquisition cases, and some Western governments and universities have restricted or screened collaborations involving HEU over concerns about China's military-civil fusion strategy, including EU-funded research projects with HEU participation.
