= Project 985 =

Former Chinese higher education development scheme, 1998-2016

- 985工程
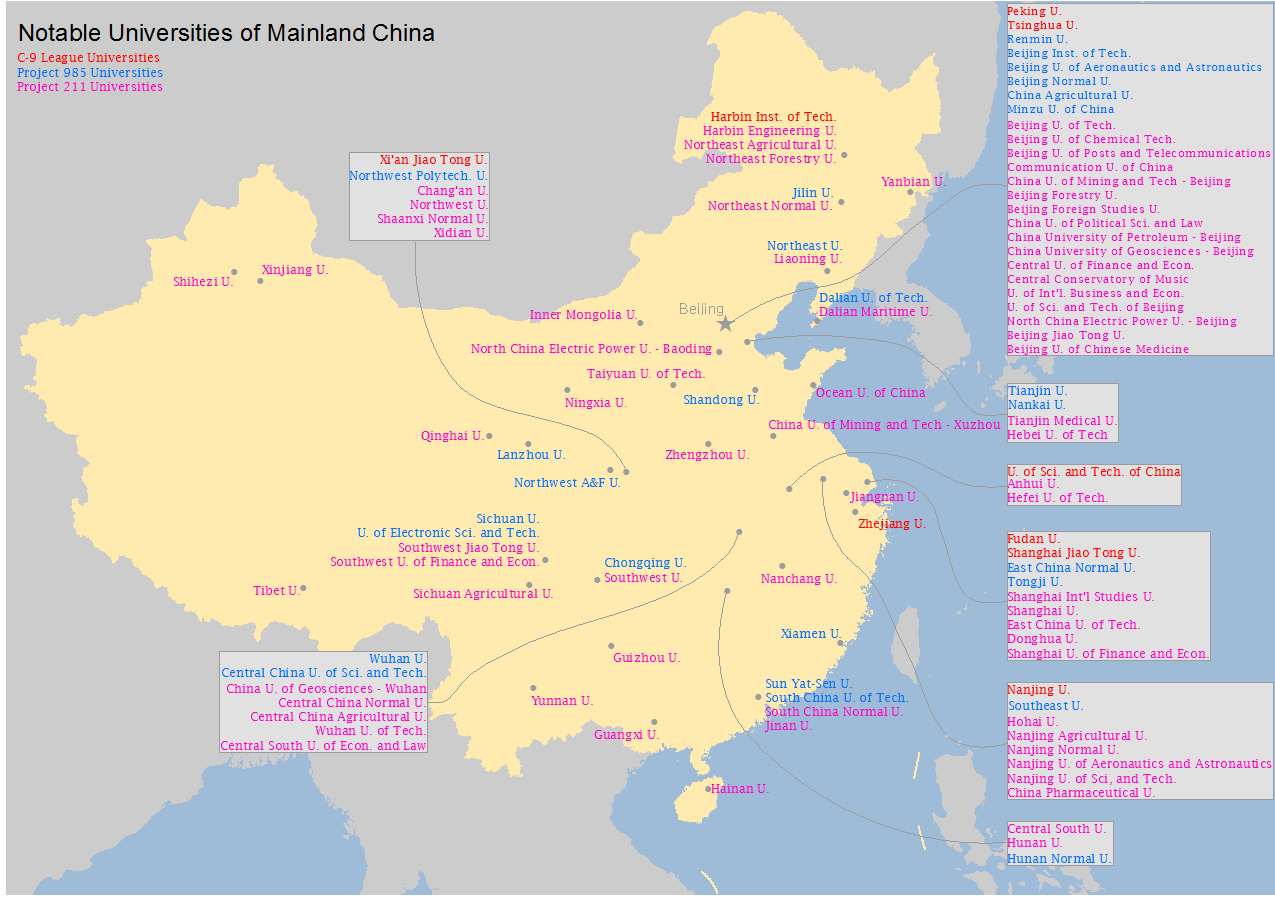
- Map showing major universities in mainland China. Project-985 universities are marked in blue.
- Predecessor: National Key Universities
- Successor: Double First-Class Construction
- Formation: 4 May 1998; 28 years ago
- Defunct: 2016; 10 years ago
- Region served: China
- Members: 39 public universities nationwide

Project 985 (Chinese: 985工程) was a higher education development and sponsorship scheme of the government of China for creating world-class higher education institutions, initiated in May 1998. There were 39 universities selected to be part of this program, which are mostly considered top-tier institutions in mainland China.

Project 211 and Project 985 were both initiated by CCP general secretary Jiang Zemin in 1990s as part of the "revitalize the country through science and education" strategy. They were nullified in 2016 and replaced by the Double First-Class Construction in 2017, under the Xi Jinping administration.

== History ==
On May 4, 1998, Jiang Zemin stated at the 100th anniversary of Peking University that, "in order to achieve modernization, our country must have several first-class universities with world-leading levels."

In January 1999, the State Council of China issued the "Education Revitalization Action Plan for the 21st Century" drafted by the Ministry of Education, deciding to focus on supporting several higher education institutions to create world-class universities and high-level universities. This plan was later referred as the "985 Project", named after Jiang Zemin's speech at the 100th anniversary of Peking University (in May 1998).

The name derives from the date of the announcement, May 1998, or 98/5 according to the Chinese date format. The project involves both national and local governments allocating large amounts of funding to certain universities in order to build new research centers, improve facilities, hold international conferences, attract world-renowned faculty and visiting scholars, and help Chinese faculty attend conferences abroad.

On June 7, 2016, the Ministry of Education under CCP general secretary Xi Jinping nullified the two projects by invalidating the fundamental documents "Measures for the Implementation and Management of Project 211 Construction" and "Opinions on the Continued Implementation of Project 985 Construction Projects." However, in China, the names 985 and 211 are still commonly used to refer to top universities within mainland China.

== List of Project-985 universities ==
There were 39 public universities selected by the Chinese central government.

Province/Municipality	City	University	Year Founded
Northern China (10)
Beijing (8)	Beijing (8)	Peking University	1898
Beijing (8)	Beijing (8)	Tsinghua University	1911
Beijing (8)	Beijing (8)	Renmin University of China	1937
Beijing (8)	Beijing (8)	Beijing Normal University	1902
Beijing (8)	Beijing (8)	Beihang University	1952
Beijing (8)	Beijing (8)	Beijing Institute of Technology	1940
Beijing (8)	Beijing (8)	China Agricultural University	1905
Beijing (8)	Beijing (8)	Minzu University of China	1941
Tianjin (2)	Tianjin (2)	Nankai University	1919
Tianjin (2)	Tianjin (2)	Tianjin University	1895
Northeastern China (4)
Liaoning (2)	Dalian	Dalian University of Technology	1949
Liaoning (2)	Shenyang	Northeastern University	1923
Heilongjiang	Harbin	Harbin Institute of Technology	1920
Jilin	Changchun	Jilin University	1946
Eastern China (11)
Shanghai (4)	Shanghai (4)	Fudan University	1905
Shanghai (4)	Shanghai (4)	Shanghai Jiao Tong University	1896
Shanghai (4)	Shanghai (4)	Tongji University	1907
Shanghai (4)	Shanghai (4)	East China Normal University	1951
Jiangsu (2)	Nanjing (2)	Nanjing University	1902
Jiangsu (2)	Nanjing (2)	Southeast University	1902
Shandong (2)	Jinan	Shandong University	1901
Shandong (2)	Qingdao	Ocean University of China	1924
Anhui	Hefei	University of Science and Technology of China	1958
Zhejiang	Hangzhou	Zhejiang University	1897
Fujian	Xiamen	Xiamen University	1921
Southern China (2)
Guangdong (2)	Guangzhou (2)	Sun Yat-sen University	1924
Guangdong (2)	Guangzhou (2)	South China University of Technology	1952
Southwestern China (3)
Sichuan (2)	Chengdu (2)	Sichuan University	1896
Sichuan (2)	Chengdu (2)	University of Electronic Science and Technology of China	1956
Chongqing	Chongqing	Chongqing University	1929
Central China (5)
Hunan (3)	Changsha (3)	Hunan University	1926
Hunan (3)	Changsha (3)	Central South University	2000
Hunan (3)	Changsha (3)	National University of Defense Technology	1953
Hubei (2)	Wuhan (2)	Wuhan University	1893
Hubei (2)	Wuhan (2)	Huazhong University of Science and Technology	1953
Northwestern China (4)
Shaanxi (3)	Xi'an (2)	Northwestern Polytechnical University	1938
Shaanxi (3)	Xi'an (2)	Xi'an Jiaotong University	1896
Shaanxi (3)	Xianyang	Northwest A&F University	1934
Gansu	Lanzhou	Lanzhou University	1909

== See also ==
- Double First-Class Construction, a scheme for improving 147 of China's universities
- C9 League, a formal group of 9 elite universities in China
- Project 211, a terminated program for developing more than 100 comprehensive universities in China
- Excellence League, an alliance of leading Chinese universities with strong backgrounds in engineering
- National Key Universities (China)
- Gaokao migration, internal migration in China built around this the gaokao exam
