= February 1903 =

Month in 1903

<<	February 1903					>>
Su	Mo	Tu	We	Th	Fr	Sa
1	2	3	4	5	6	7
8	9	10	11	12	13	14
15	16	17	18	19	20	21
22	23	24	25	26	27	28

February 20, 1903: King Edward VII approves new flag of Australia

... to replace previous Australian flag

The following events occurred in February 1903:

== February 1, 1903 (Sunday) ==
- At the Battle of Kano, British Army troops invaded the Kano Emirate in northern Nigeria while its ruler, the Emir Aliyu Babba, was away to another kingdom at Sokoto.
- The British lifeboat James Stevens, based at Mumbles, capsized at the mouth of the River Afan in Wales while on its way to rescue the stranded Christina, resulting in the deaths of six of her fourteen crew, mostly volunteers who worked as oyster fishermen.
- Died: Sir George Stokes, 1st Baronet, 83, Irish mathematician and physicist

== February 2, 1903 (Monday) ==
- Belgian colonial administrator Louis Royaux and a geological engineer, Captain Landeghem, accompanied by Belgium's Force Publique, crossed the northern boundary of the Congo Free state in order to explore for further sources of copper, but proceeded no further than Deim Zubeir.
- Born: Bartel Leendert van der Waerden, Dutch mathematician, in Amsterdam (died 1996)

== February 3, 1903 (Tuesday) ==
- In the Discovery Expedition, Captain Robert Falcon Scott and his companions, Edward Adrian Wilson and Ernest Shackleton, returned to their ship, RRS Discovery after their southern journey of 960 miles (1,540 km), including relays, in 93 days at a daily average of just over 10 miles (16 km). Discovery then departed from Antarctica on February 16.
- The U.S. Navy Department ordered warships to Honduras to protect American interests as a revolutionary uprising broke out.
- The Kano Emirate in Nigeria was annexed by the British Empire.
- President Terencio Sierra of Honduras resigned and turned power over to a council of ministers headed by Juan Ángel Arias Boquín. At Amapala, the Honduran rebel leader Manuel Bonilla declared announced his intention to become the president of the republic.
- Born: Douglas Douglas-Hamilton, 14th Duke of Hamilton, Scottish politician and pioneering aviator, in London (died 1973)

== February 4, 1903 (Wednesday) ==
- The Espingole struck a rock at Cavalaire-sur-Mer, sustaining a large hole in the bottom of the hull, and sank in Cavalaire Bay after its sister ship, Hallebarde rescued the 62-man crew. Lieutenant Marcotte de Sainte-Marie was court-martialed and would not be acquitted until seven years later.
- Born: Alexander Imich, Polish-born American parapsychologist and chemist, in Częstochowa (died 2014)

== February 5, 1903 (Thursday) ==
- Boxer Jack Johnson defeated Denver Ed Martin in Los Angeles to win the World Colored Heavyweight Championship in a 20-round bout, prompting speculation that he should fight for the overall world heavyweight championship held by white boxer James J. Jeffries.
- In the South Antrim by-election in Ireland, brought about by the resignation of Irish Unionist MP William Ellison-Macartney, Charles Curtis Craig retained the seat for the party.
- Born: Koto Matsudaira, Japanese diplomat, ambassador to the United Nations, in Tokyo (died 1994)

== February 6, 1903 (Friday) ==
- Brazilian forces invaded Bolivia and captured the border town of Puerto Alonzo.
- U.S. president Theodore Roosevelt declined a request to serve as arbitrator of the priority of treatment of claims by Britain, Germany and Italy for reparations from Venezuela.
- Born: Claudio Arrau, Chilean pianist, in Chillán (died 1991)

== February 7, 1903 (Saturday) ==
- Striking bituminous coal miners in the United States agreed to accept an offer of a 14% increase in their wages, ending the UMWA strike.
- In negotiations in Washington, DC, between Germany and the United Kingdom to settle the "Venezuela Affair" a dispute between the two nations over reparations from Venezuela, Germany's Ambassador to the U.S. revealed that Germany and Italy had made a secret agreement for any settlement to apply to Italy's interests as well. The British ambassador, Sir Michael Herbert, declared that "Its discovery at this late hour cannot affect the settlement of the Venezuelan affair."
- Striking streetcar workers in Montreal accepted a settlement with the city's railway system, recognizing their right to form a labor union and granting them a 10% increase in their wages.
- Died: James Glaisher, 93, English meteorologist and aeronaut

== February 8, 1903 (Sunday) ==
- Sir Michael Herbert, Britain's Ambassador to the United States, made the first proposal to end the blockade of Venezuela by Britain, Germany and Italy, presenting the draft of a protocol to the U.S. Ambassador to Venezuela, Herbert W. Bowen.
- Meeting in Cincinnati, the executive board of American Jewish Congregations voted "to establish Jewish churches in every community in the United States", with synagogues built and rabbis assigned in "larger towns" and, "in communities where there is a lack of wealth necessary to support a church circuit", to assign rabbis who would visit the community at stated intervals and conduct religious services.
- Born:
  - Tunku Abdul Rahman, Malaysian politician, first Chief Minister of the Federation of Malaysia, in Alor Setar, Kedah (died 1990)
  - Greta Keller, Austrian cabaret singer and actress; in Vienna (died 1977)

== February 9, 1903 (Monday) ==
- In Britain, the Midlands Railway successfully tested a new compound engine that would allow trains to attain the speed of 82 miles per hour (132 km/h).
- The Kingdom of Bulgaria asked foreign powers to aid in halting the Ottoman Empire's military preparations for an invasion at Adrianople and Monastir.
- The U.S. state of Alabama created its 67th and last county, Houston County, from parts of Dale County, Geneva County and Henry County, with the city of Dothan as its county seat.
- The oratorio Marie-Magdeleine, by Jules Massenet with libretto by Louis Gallet and staging, was performed for the first time, with Pauline Viardot singing at Nice in France.
- Born: Georg Trexler, a German composer, in Prima, Germany (died 1979)

== February 10, 1903 (Tuesday) ==
- The venue for the 1904 Summer Olympics was moved from Chicago to St. Louis by vote of the International Olympic Committee after Chicago's leaders had announced their opposition to building a stadium to accommodate 75,000 spectators.
- Three of the preludes from Sergei Rachmaninoff's Opus 23 were performed for the first time, with Preludes No. 1, No. 2 and No. 5 performed by an orchestra in Moscow.
- The American steamship Madiana struck a reef while traveling near Hamilton, Bermuda. All passengers and crew were saved, but the ship was totally destroyed.
- Born:
  - Waldemar Hoven, German physician and war criminal, in Freiburg (executed 1948)
  - Matthias Sindelar, Austrian footballer, in Kozlov (died 1939, carbon monoxide poisoning)

== February 11, 1903 (Wednesday) ==
- Oxnard strike of 1903: Japanese and 200 Mexican laborers became charter members of the Japanese-Mexican Labor Association (JMLA); it was the first time in U.S. history that a labor union had been formed by members of different races.
- Anton Bruckner's 9th Symphony received its première in Vienna, Austria, conducted by Ferdinand Löwe, nearly seven years after the composer's death.

== February 12, 1903 (Thursday) ==
- The aircraft engine that would power the Wright brothers' first airplane later in 1903 was run for the first time in Dayton, Ohio, United States. It was the first successful attempt to build a heavier-than-air aircraft engine.
- Randall Davidson was enthroned as the Archbishop of Canterbury at Canterbury Cathedral in England, succeeding the late Frederick Temple.
- The North British Locomotive Company was established in Glasgow, Scotland, through a merger of manufacturing companies Dübs, Neilson, Reid, and Sharp Stewart.

== February 13, 1903 (Friday) ==
- Britain, Germany and Italy reached a settlement with Venezuela, ending the naval blockade imposed because of the country's refusal to pay foreign debts and reparation for damages suffered by European citizens in the Federal War, and bringing an end to the Venezuelan crisis. The settlement was achieved through American intervention by means of the Washington Protocols.
- Born: Georges Simenon, Belgian writer, in Liège (died 1989)

== February 14, 1903 (Saturday) ==
The United States Department of Commerce and Labor was created as U.S. President Theodore Roosevelt signed a bill into law for a new cabinet-level department ""to foster, promote, and develop the foreign and domestic commerce, the mining, manufacturing, shipping, and fishing industries, the labor interests, and the transportation facilities of the United States."

- The Kingdom of Bulgaria arrested the leaders of two groups seeking autonomy for the Macedonian minority.
- Born: Stuart Erwin, American actor, in Squaw Valley, California (died 1967)
- Died: Archduchess Elisabeth Franziska of Austria, 72, Hungarian noblewoman, widow of Archduke Ferdinand Karl Viktor of Austria-Este and Archduke Karl Ferdinand of Austria

== February 15, 1903 (Sunday) ==
- Morris and Rose Michtom introduced the first teddy bear in the United States, naming it after U.S. President Theodore Roosevelt.
- The blockade of the coast of Venezuela by Britain, Germany and Italy came to an end.

== February 16, 1903 (Monday) ==
- President Palma of Cuba signed an agreement permitting the U.S. Navy to build coaling stations on the island for refueling.
- Romanian inventor Traian Vuia told the Académie des Sciences of Paris about his procedure for taking off in a heavier-than-air mechanical machine. His ideas were rejected.
- Born: Edgar Bergen, American ventriloquist and actor, in Chicago (died 1978)

== February 17, 1903 (Tuesday) ==
- A protocol at Washington was signed between Venezuela and the U.S. for a commission to settle claims by American citizens against the South American nation.
- King Edward VII opened the new session of the British Parliament.
- Born: Hans Linthorst Homan, Dutch politician and diplomat, in Assen (died 1986)
- Died: Joseph Parry, Welsh composer and musician (b. 1841)

== February 18, 1903 (Wednesday) ==
- George B. Cortelyou, the personal secretary of President Roosevelt, was appointed by the president and confirmed the same day by the Senate as the first U.S. Secretary of Commerce and Labor.
- George Shiras Jr. announced his retirement as an associate justice of the U.S. Supreme Court after having recently turned 71 years old. Shiras, who had been appointed to the Supreme Court in 1892, had never served as a judge prior to being put on the highest court in the nation.
- A court in Venezuela settled the first of the U.S. claims, awarding an American businessman $700,000 in damages for Venezuela's unilateral cancellation of concession.
- Born: Nikolai Podgorny, Soviet Ukrainian politician who was the head of state of the Soviet Union from 1964 to 1977 as President of the Presidium.(died 1983)

== February 19, 1903 (Thursday) ==
- The U.S. Congress passed the Isthmian Canal Act, providing funding and authorization for the construction of a canal across the Isthmus of Panama.
- The Chamber of Deputies of the Kingdom of Italy overwhelmingly rejected a bill to reduce the expenditures of the Italian Army, with 269 against and only 64 in favor.
- Germany and Venezuela formally resumed diplomatic relations.

== February 20, 1903 (Friday) ==
- King Edward VII of the United Kingdom approved a redesign of the Flag of Australia, on which the stars of the Southern Cross were combined with the Union Jack.

== February 21, 1903 (Saturday) ==
- After 43 ballots, the legislature of the U.S. state of Oregon finally approved its new U.S. Seantor, Charles W. Fulton.
- U.S. President Roosevelt oversaw a ceremony for the laying of the cornerstone for the building of the U.S. Army War College in Washington.
- Born:
  - Anaïs Nin, French writer, in Neuilly-sur-Seine (died 1977)
  - Raymond Queneau, French poet and novelist, in Le Havre (died 1976)

== February 22, 1903 (Sunday) ==
- Born:
  - Morley Callaghan, Canadian writer and media personality, in Toronto (died 1990)
  - Ain-Ervin Mere, Estonian Nazi, in Vändra (died 1969)
  - Frank P. Ramsey, English mathematician, in Cambridge (died 1930)
- Died: Hugo Wolf, 42, Austrian composer (syphilis)

== February 23, 1903 (Monday) ==
- Cuba leased Guantánamo Bay to the United States "in perpetuity" under the terms of the Cuban–American Treaty.
- A volcano erupted in the Mexican state of Colima after being preceded by a series of earthquake shocks.
- The U.S. Supreme Court upheld the constitutionality of a federal law that prohibited the sending of lottery tickets from one of the 45 states to another. The Court ruled that the ban was within the power of Congress to regulate interstate commerce.

== February 24, 1903 (Tuesday) ==
- The United States signed a landmark agreement with Cuba to establish a permanent naval station at Guantanamo Bay
- Born: Vladimir Bartol, Slovene author, in Trieste, Austria-Hungary (died 1967)

== February 25, 1903 (Wednesday) ==
- Born: King Clancy, Canadian ice hockey player, Ottawa, Ontario (died 1986)

== February 26, 1903 (Thursday) ==
- U.S. Representative James J. Butler was unseated by vote of the House of Representatives, and replaced by George C.R. Wagoner.
- The ocean liner SS Columbus, later renamed by the White Star Line as Republic, was launched by Harland and Wolff at Belfast, Northern Ireland.
- Born: Giulio Natta, Italian chemist, Nobel Prize laureate, in Imperia (died 1979)
- Died: Richard Jordan Gatling, 84, American inventor who invented the Gatling Gun

== February 27, 1903 (Friday) ==
- At the battle of Kwatarkwashi, forces from the British-administered Protectorate of Northern Nigeria defeated the army of the Sokoto Caliphate's Kano Emirate, effectively ending self-government of the emirate.
- The Prime Minister of Portugal resigned with his entire cabinet. A new cabinet was formed the next day.
- France and Venezuela signed a protocol for the settlement of French claims.
- Born: Grethe Weiser, German actress, in Hanover (died 1970)

== February 28, 1903 (Saturday) ==
- The Netherlands and Venezuela signed a protocol for the settlement of Dutch claims.
- Born: Vincente Minnelli, American director, in Chicago (died 1986)
