= Durandal (disambiguation) =

Durandal or Durendal is the legendary sword of the French hero Roland.

Durandal may also refer to:

== Military ==
- Durandal-class destroyer, a group of four destroyers built for the French Navy between 1896 and 1900, used during the First World War
- French destroyer Durandal, the name ship of her class
- Matra Durandal, an anti-runway penetration bomb
- SNCASE SE.212 Durandal, a French prototype fighter aircraft

== Arts and entertainment ==
- Durendal (journal), a Belgian literary and cultural review (1894-1921)
- Durandal (novel), a novel by Harold Lamb
- Marathon 2: Durandal, 1995 video game
- Gilbert Durandal, a character in Mobile Suit Gundam SEED Destiny

== Other uses ==
- Segundo Durandal (1912–1976), Bolivian football defender
- Durandal (horse), a Japanese racehorse

== See also ==
- Dirndl, a traditional Bavarian dress
