= January 1903 =

Month in 1903

<<	January 1903					>>
Su	Mo	Tu	We	Th	Fr	Sa
				1	2	3
4	5	6	7	8	9	10
11	12	13	14	15	16	17
18	19	20	21	22	23	24
25	26	27	28	29	30	31

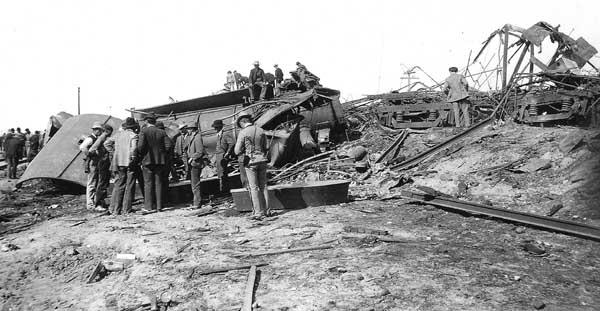
January 28, 1903: Head-on collision of express trains kills 14, injures 53 in Arizona Territory

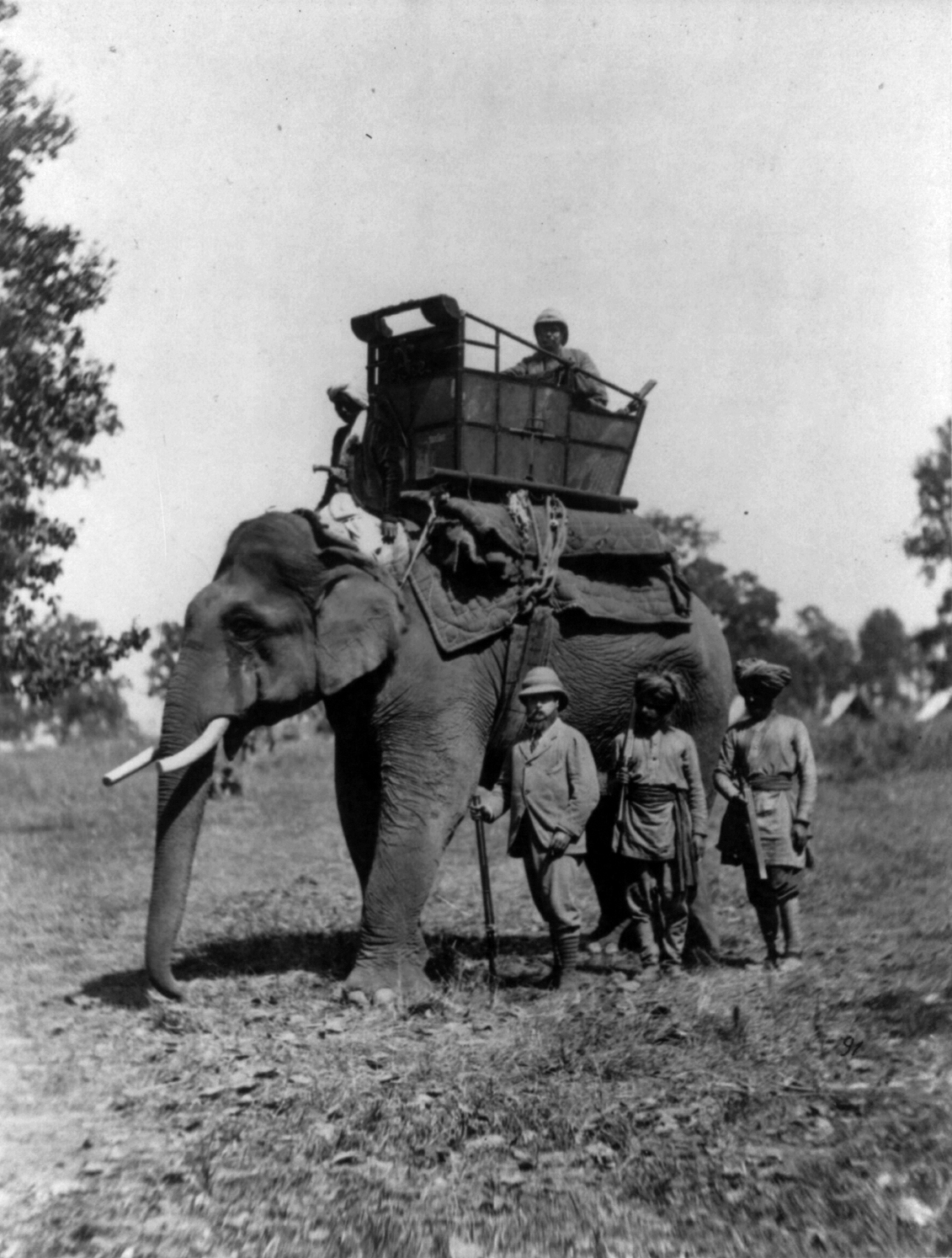
January 1, 1903: Edward proclaimed Emperor of India

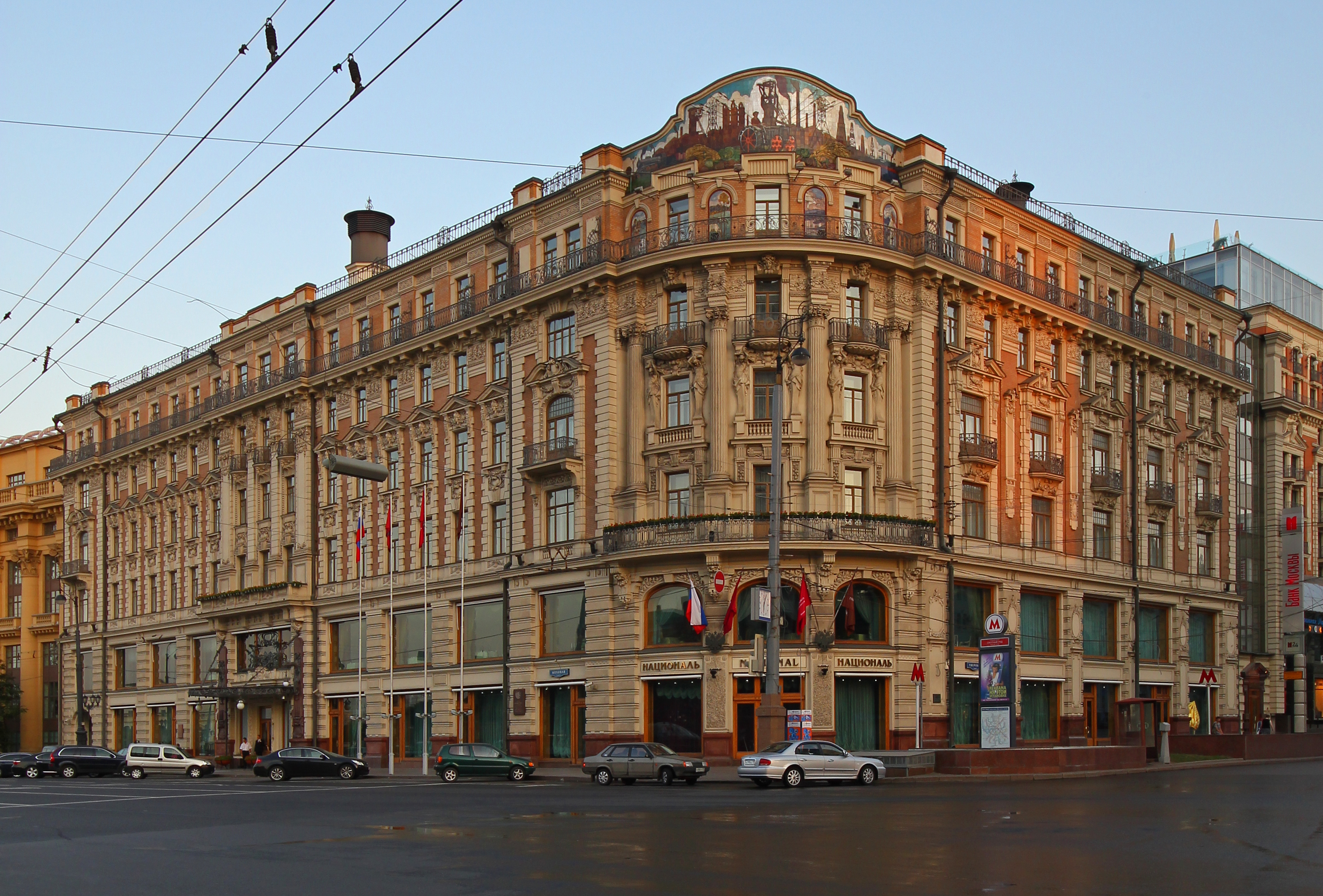
January 14, 1903: Hotel National opens in Moscow

The following events occurred in January 1903:

== January 1, 1903 (Thursday) ==
- King Edward VII of the United Kingdom was proclaimed Emperor of India, a title first established during the reign of his mother, Queen Victoria.
- Konstantin Tsiolkovsky's article, Explorations of outer space with the help of reaction apparatuses, was published, describing his Basic Rocket Equation.
- In the United States, Syracuse Athletic Club defeated Orange Athletic Club 36–0 at Madison Square Garden, to win the 1902–03 World Series of Football.

== January 2, 1903 (Friday) ==
- U.S. President Theodore Roosevelt ordered that the post office of Indianola, Mississippi, remain closed until the city's residents were willing to accept an African-American postmaster, Minnie M. Cox, who had been appointed by the President.
- Born: Kane Tanaka, oldest living person in the world from 22 July 2018 to 19 April 2022.

== January 3, 1903 (Saturday) ==
- The Norwegian ship Remittant was towed into quarantine in Queenstown, Ireland, as a result of an outbreak of beriberi among the crew.

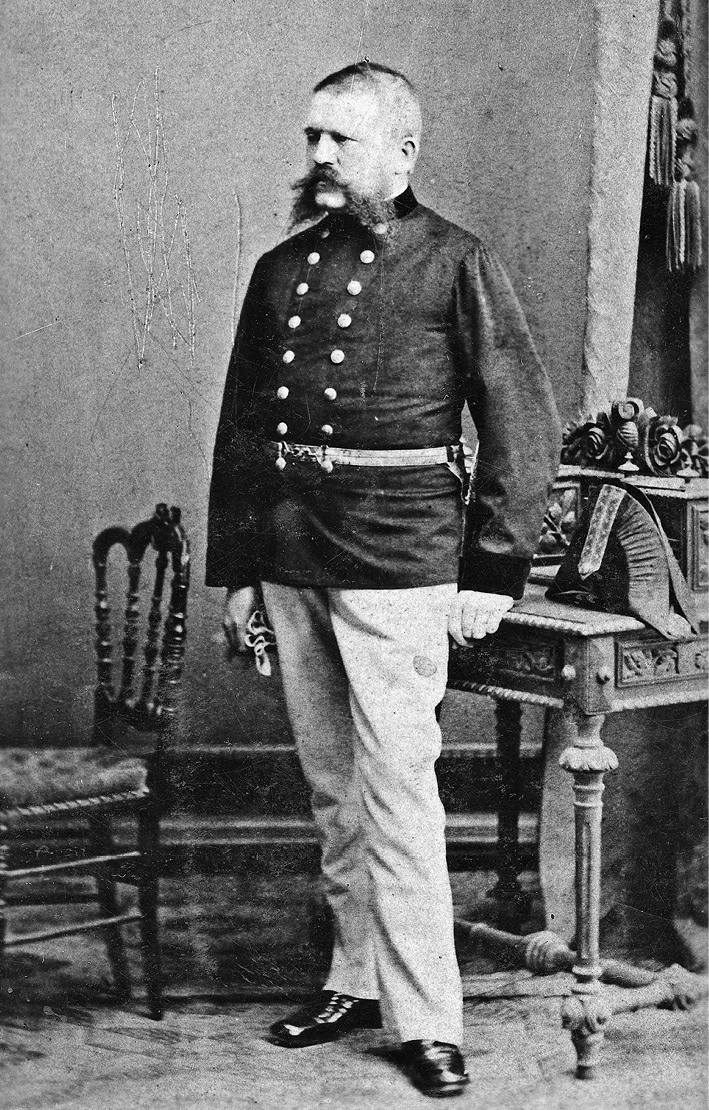
Herr Oberoffizial Hitler

- Died: Alois Hitler, 65, Austrian civil servant, father of Adolf Hitler, died of a what is believed to have been a pleural hemorrhage.

== January 4, 1903 (Sunday) ==
- Elections were held for the French Senate, with gains for the majority party led by Prime Minister Combes.
- In fighting near Guatere, 57 Venezuelan rebels were killed in battle with government troops.
- Born: Johann Georg Elser, German carpenter and attempted assassin of Adolf Hitler, in Hermaringen, Württemberg (d. 1945)
- Died:
  - Alexandr Aksakov, 70, Russian writer
  - Topsy, c. 28, female Asian elephant, was killed by poisoned and electrocuted at Luna Park, Coney Island, New York City. The Edison Manufacturing Company would release the film Electrocuting an Elephant, documenting Topsy's death, later in the month.

== January 5, 1903 (Monday) ==
- Died: Práxedes Mateo Sagasta, 77, former Prime Minister of Spain (b. 1825)

== January 6, 1903 (Tuesday) ==
- Born: Maurice Abravanel, Greek conductor, in Thessaloniki (died 1993)

== January 7, 1903 (Wednesday) ==
- In Nevada, twelve striking members of the Miners' Union attacked mine manager J. A. Traylor in his office. Traylor shot and killed three of the miners and seriously wounded three others.
- George Pardee was sworn in as Governor of California in Sacramento.
- Born: Alan Napier, English stage, film and television actor known for portraying the butler "Alfred" on the 1966 Batman TV series; in King's Norton, Birmingham (died 1988)

== January 8, 1903 (Thursday) ==
- Born: Gene Roth, American film actor and former theater manager, in Redfield, South Dakota (died 1976)

== January 9, 1903 (Friday) ==
- The Irish cargo ship SS Palmas was last sighted while on a voyage from Liverpool, England, to Boston, Massachusetts, United States. The vessel was never seen again and was presumed to have sunk in the Atlantic Ocean with the loss of all 39 crew.
- The Venezuelan government retook the port of Tucacas, that had been under the control of rebels since September.

== January 10, 1903 (Saturday) ==
- Born: Barbara Hepworth, English sculptor, in Wakefield (died 1975)

== January 11, 1903 (Sunday) ==
- Born: Alan Paton, South African author and anti-apartheid activist, in Pietermaritzburg (died 1988)

== January 12, 1903 (Monday) ==
- Manuel Bonilla was elected as the President of Honduras by the Honduran Congress.
- Born:
  - Igor Kurchatov, Russian physicist, in Simsky Zavod (died 1960)
  - Andrew J. Transue, American Congressman and attorney (Morissette v. United States), in Clarksville, Michigan (died 1995)

== January 13, 1903 (Tuesday) ==
- A fire killed 170 people at the Rhodes Opera House burns in Boyertown, Pennsylvania.
- The legislature of the U.S. state of California re-elected George C. Perkins as United States Senator, while the state of Idaho's legislators elected Weldon B. Heyburn to succeed Henry Heitfeld as their member of the U.S. Senate.

== January 14, 1903 (Wednesday) ==
- The Hotel National, Moscow, designed by Alexander Ivanov and financed by The Varvarinskoe Joint-Stock Company of Householders, opened to customers.

== January 15, 1903 (Thursday) ==
- On a street corner in Columbia, South Carolina, James H. Tillman, the Lieutenant Governor of South Carolina, shot and mortally wounded newspaper editor Narciso Gener Gonzales, who would die on January 19. Tillman would be acquitted of Gonzales' murder on the grounds of self-defense on October 15, but the press would condemn the verdict, and Tillman would retire in disgrace from public life.
- France's Chamber of Deputies voted, 313 to 211, to endorse the acts of the government in enforcing the law regulating associations and assemblies.

== January 16, 1903 (Friday) ==
- A powder explosion in an 8-inch (203 mm) gun turret aboard the battleship USS Massachusetts (BB-2) killed nine men.
- Born:
  - Peter Brocco, American actor, in Reading, Pennsylvania (died 1992, heart attack)
  - William Grover-Williams, French racing driver and war hero, in Montrouge (executed by Nazi Germany, 1945)

== January 17, 1903 (Saturday) ==
- El Yunque National Forest in Puerto Rico became part of the United States National Forest System, as the Luquillo Forest Reserve.

== January 18, 1903 (Sunday) ==
- A transmitter in Massachusetts sent the first transatlantic radio transmission to originate in the United States.

== January 19, 1903 (Monday) ==
- The first west–east transatlantic radio broadcast was made from the United States to England (the first east–west broadcast having been made in 1901).
- Born: Boris Blacher, German composer and librettist, in Niutschuang (Newchwang), Fengtian, Qing Empire (died 1975)
- Died: Narciso Gener Gonzales, 44, American journalist and newspaper editor, died from his gunshot wound sustained on January 15.

== January 20, 1903 (Tuesday) ==
- In the New York election to the United States Senate, incumbent Republican Senator Thomas C. Platt was re-elected by New York's state legislature. Elections were made by the state legislatures as well for new U.S. Seantors in Arkansas, Illinois, Michigan, Missouri, South Dakota and Utah, while re-election of U.S. Senators took place in Connecticut, Indiana, New Hampshire, North Dakota and Pennsylvania.

== January 21, 1903 (Wednesday) ==
- The American tugboat Leyden foundered in heavy fog in the Atlantic Ocean off Block Island, Rhode Island, while returning from Puerto Rico.
- Robert Reid was appointed to the Australian Senate for Victoria to replace the recently deceased Senator Sir Frederick Sargood.
- U.S. President Roosevelt signed into law a reorganization of the militia system in the United States.

== January 22, 1903 (Thursday) ==
- Representatives of the United States and Colombia signed the Panama Canal Treaty, with Colombia giving up its territory of Panama.
- German warships renewed their bombardment of Venezuela's Fort San Carlos, which guarded the entry to the lagoon leading to the city of Maracaibo.
- Born: Fritz Houtermans, Polish physicist, in Gdańsk (d. 1966)

== January 23, 1903 (Friday) ==
- In London, Colonel Arthur Lynch, a former member of the British House of Commons, was convicted of high treason for fighting on the side of South Africa's Boers in the Second Boer War, and sentenced to death., though he would later be pardoned.
- Born: Jorge Eliécer Gaitán, Colombian politician, in Cucunubá or Manta (assassinated 1948)

== January 24, 1903 (Saturday) ==
- German applied physicist K. Ferdinand Braun announced his discovery of an improved system of wireless telegraphy, the "two circuit system" for transmitter and receiver which made long-distance wireless communication possible. Braun would share the 1905 Nobel Prize in Physics with wireless telegraph inventor Guglielmo Marconi.
- The Grand Vizier of the Ottoman Empire ordered the Turkish treasury to cease all payments on bills without his prior approval.
- In Washington, representatives of the U.S. and the UK signed a treaty to provide for a joint arbitration commission to determine the boundary between the Alaskan Territory of the U.S. and the Canadian province of British Columbia.
- Born: Robert Gwathmey, American social realist painter, in Manchester, Virginia (died 1988)

== January 25, 1903 (Sunday) ==
- Died: Charles Roberts Ingersoll, Governor of the U.S. State of Connecticut from 1873 to 1877 (b. 1821)

== January 26, 1903 (Monday) ==
- The foreign legations of the U.S., Britain and France in China formally objected to the appointment by China for the appointment of Yu Lien-san as governor of the Shanxi province.

== January 27, 1903 (Tuesday) ==
- A fire killed 52 patients at the Colney Hatch Asylum in London.
- José Plácido de Castro proclaimed the Third Republic of Acre.
- U.S. multimillionaire businessman and oil baron John D. Rockefeller announced that he had donated $7,000,000 for research for a serum to cure tuberculosis.
- Born: John Eccles, Australian neuropsychologist, recipient of the Nobel Prize in Physiology or Medicine; in Melbourne (died 1997)

== January 28, 1903 (Wednesday) ==
- A railway crash killed 14 people in the U.S. when the Crescent City Express, bound for Benson, Arizona, collided head-on with the Pacific Coast Express, bound for Tucson, Arizona. The accident was caused by a communication failure.
- Died:
  - Augusta Holmès, 55, French composer, died from a heart attack.
  - Robert Planquette, 54, French composer

== January 29, 1903 (Thursday) ==
- Railroad workers across the Netherlands organized a widespread strike to protest poor working conditions, low wages, and demanding better labor rights. This strike was part of the growing labor movement in early 20th century Europe, highlighting the increasing power of organized workers and their struggle for improved workplace standards.

== January 30, 1903 (Friday) ==
- The legislature of the U.S. state of North Carolina elected Democrat Lee S. Overman to replace Republican J. C. Pritchard as one of its two U.S. Seanators.
- 'Born: G. Evelyn Hutchinson, a British ecologist sometimes described as the "father of modern ecology;in Cambridge (died 1991)

== January 31, 1903 (Saturday) ==
- The Shivaji Rao Holkar XII, Maharajah since 1886 of Indore, a princely state in India, abdicated because of poor health, and was succeeded by his son, Tukoji Rao III Holkar XIII.
- The inaugural concert for the Palais des Fêtes took place at the German city of Sängerhaus (now Strasbourg in France.
