= Timeline of Latino civil rights in the United States =

The following is a timeline of Latino civil rights in the United States.

== Important organizations in the fight for Latino civil rights ==
=== 1890–1900 ===
==== Alianza Hispano-Americana ====
1894: The AHA was founded in Arizona in 1894 to defend Mexicanos' rights and improve their life quality. The Alianza was one of the first regional Mexican American organizations. By 1930 the Alianza had almost 300 lodges scattered throughout the Southwest and mainly in Arizona. These lodges were a safe haven for members providing various social services and helping Mexicanos who faced discrimination and denial of their civil liberties.

=== 1900–1920 ===
==== Japanese-Mexican Labor Association ====
1903: On February 11, 1903, 500 Japanese and 200 Mexican laborers joined and formed the first labor union called, the Japanese-Mexican Labor Association. The JMLA opposed the Western Agricultural Contracting Company with three major concerns, the artificial suppression of wages, the subcontracting system that forced workers to pay double commissions, and the inflated prices of the company store. In order to address their concerns, the JMLA declared a strike against the WACC during a pivotal moment in the sugar beet season. Several of WACC's contracted workers joined the JMLA, which caused a standstill in the sugar industry. Eventually the WACC conceded to most of the JMLA's demands.

==== El Primer Congreso Mexicanista ====
1911: El Primer Congreso Mexicanista met in Laredo, Texas from September 14 to 22, 1911. It was the first large convention of Mexican Americans to organize against social injustice.

=== 1920–1930 ===
==== American Civil Liberties Union (ACLU) ====
1920: The ACLU was founded in 1920 by a group of social and political activists who were dedicated to protecting the civil rights guaranteed to all citizens by the constitution. When it was first founded, the ACLU was very active in pro-labor protests; however, more recently it has mainly focused on legal matters such as, due process, the right of freedom of opinion and expression and equality before the law. Often, the ACLU has supported Mexican American organizations in lawsuits regarding segregation and voting discrimination.

==== The Confederacion de Uniones Obreras Mexicanas ====
1928: The federation of Mexican workers Union was the first ever union for Mexican workers, founded in Los Angeles in 1928. The focus of the organization was to deal with the issues of increasing unemployment among Mexican immigrants as the U.S. economy began to weaken. The CUOM served as an umbrella group for the agricultural unions in Southern California, which were made up of Mexican Americans. In 1928 the organization had over 3,000 members and represented 8 different unions. After the Great Depression hit the US the CUOM also began advocating for restrictions on repatriation and immigration.

==== The League of United Latin American Citizens (LULAC) ====
1929: On February 17 the League of United Latin American Citizens (LULAC) was founded by Mexican American men in Corpus Christi, Texas. LULAC is the largest and longest-lasting Latino civil rights group in the country. The LULAC addressed the needs of Mexican American middle-class men who wanted to combat racism, which stood in the way of community empowerment. The LULAC was the first organization of Mexican-Descent to emphasize U.S. citizenship. The LULAC emerged within the historical context of South Texas between 1920 and 1930. Texas transformed from ranching and farming to an urban society, which provided a foundation for the emergence of the Mexico Texano male middle class.

=== 1930–1940 ===
==== El Congreso Del Pueblo de Habla Espanola ====
1935: EL Congreso grew in Southern California between 1935 and 1950. Its goal was to promote civil rights specifically in terms of working conditions for Latinos and other minorities. The first national convention of El Congreso was held in Los Angeles on April 28, 1939, and attracted over 1,000 delegates who represented more than 120 organizations. Moreno along with other members of El Congreso drafted plans at hotel Alexandria for the protection of the foreign born, focusing on deportation and discriminatory legislation, which targeted aliens. Josefina Fierro de Bright later joined Moreno as one of the leaders of the organization and helped rejuvenate El Congreso. Fierro de Bright and Moreno delivered moving speeches and encouraged involvement in voter registration drives to try to end the oppression of agricultural workers at the hands of labor bosses and farm growers.

=== 1950–1960 ===
==== American Council of Spanish-Speaking People ====
1950: the council was established at the beginning of the 1950s during a convention of Chicano civil rights groups in El Paso, Texas. George I. Sanchez was the first executive director of the council. Sanches and the council were dedicated to desegregating schools. In 1952 the council joined the Alianza Hispano-Americana and filed several lawsuits against Arizona school districts, which continued to practice school segregation.

=== 1960–1970 ===
==== Alianza Federal de Pueblos Libres ====
1963: The Federal Alliance of Free Towns was founded by Reies Lopez Tijerina in 1963. Its ultimate goal was to regain lands awarded by the Spanish and Mexican governments to early settlers and to their townships and later lost for various reasons after the official U.S. takeover of the Southwest in 1848. The Alianza switched between legal action and confrontational tactics, which raised considerable public concern. In 1976 members of the Alianza raided the Tierra Amarilla courthouse following the lead of Tijerina. The decline of the Alianza began in 1970 when Tijerina was sentenced to jail.

==== United Farm Workers ====
1966: The NFWA merged with the Filipino American union called AWOC to form the United Farm Workers. The UFW was led by Chavez and Huerta and its goal was to improve conditions and wages for farmworkers and to increase the political power of Latinos. In order to garner national attention the UFW initiated boycotts, fasting, grassroots community organizing, voter registration drives and appeals to spiritual values. The union affiliates with the AFL-CIO, the national labor federation.

==== The Mexican American Youth Organization (MAYO) ====
1967: The Mexican American Youth Organization was founded in San Antonio, Texas, and was the major political organization of Mexican-American youth for over a decade. The organization was founded by José Ángel Gutiérrez and four other young chicanos who were all known as "Los Cincos". MAYO became one of the anchors of the Chicano movement as it fought for social justice while emphasizing the idea of Chicano cultural nationalism. Gutierrez and the other founders staged MAYO's first demonstration in front of the Alamo on July 4, 1967. Group membership consisted of Mexican-American teenagers and university students who were committed to the concept of la Raza. MAYO identified and addressed 3 needs of Mexican Americans: economic independence, local control of education, and political strength and unity through the formation of a 3rd party. Throughout the rest of the 60's and early 70's MAYO's membership rose as chapters popped up at schools and universities throughout the nation. By 1970, there were over 1,000 MAYO chapters.

=== 1970–1980 ===
==== The Raza Unida Party ====
1970: The Raza Unida Party was established on January 17, 1970, at a meeting of 300 Mexican Americans in Crystal City, Texas. The Raza Unida Party was founded in opposition to the two party system and offered a third political party to people in Texas. After it filed for party status in 1970, the RUP sought to bring greater economic, social and political self-determination to Mexican Americans in Texas. Membership in the party was open to anyone who was committed to RUP's goals. In April 1971 the party won a total of fifteen seats in the city council and school board election. In 1971, held its first state convention in San Antonio and voted to organize at the state level. That year the RUP ran 11 candidates for state offices in Texas. In 1972, the RUP held its first national conference in El Paso where about half of the estimated participants were women. At the national conference the delegates from the Congreso de Aztlan to run the national party and elected Gutierrez as the national chairman of the RUP.

== Important political figures in the fight for Latino civil rights ==
=== 1920–1930 ===
==== Octaviano Larrazolo ====
Octaviano Larrazolo was from New Mexico and became the first Mexican-American U.S. Senator. Larrazolo was appointed clerk of the district court at el paso before being appointed clerk of the United States district and circuit courts for the Western District of Texas at El Paso. In 1895 Larrazolo moved to Las Vegas, Nevada where he practiced law and became involved with the Democratic party and focused on civil rights for Mexican Americans. Larrazolo had difficulty gaining popularity in the Democratic party because Latino rights were better represented in the Republican party. In 1911 Larrazolo attended the constitutional convention held in reparation for the New Mexico territory to enter the Union. Larrazolo and other Latino delegates were successful in implementing pro-Latino measures and language into the New Mexico State constitution. In 1923 he was elected to the US House of Representatives and in 1928 he was elected as a Democratic Senator of New Mexico.

==== Benjamin Nathan Cardozo ====
Benjamin Cardozo, a Sephardi Jew of Portuguese descent, has been claimed by some as the first Hispanic named to the US Supreme Court. In 1917 he was elected on the democratic and republican tickets to serve a 14-year term on the Court of Appeals. He was then elected again in 1926 on both the democratic and republican tickets to serve a 14-year term as Chief Judge.

=== 1930–1940 ===
==== Luisa Moreno ====
Luisa Moreno was a Guatemalan organizer and civil rights activist. She was born to an upper-class family in Guatemala and moved to New York City in 1928. She was motivated to advocate for civil rights when she witnessed the terrible working conditions in the garment industry. She was also surprised by the amount of racial segregation and discrimination present in the United States at that time. She was first hired by the American Federation of Labor as a professional organizer before she founded El Corso Pueblo de Habla Espanola, which was the first national effort to unite Latino workers from different ethnic backgrounds. Its first conference was held in Los Angeles in 1938. Later, Luisa was deported from the US during "Operation Wetback" where more than 3.8 million Latin Americans had to leave the US.

=== 1940–1950 ===
==== Senator Dennis Chavez ====
Dennis Chavez was the Senator of New Mexico and introduced the first Fair Employment Practices Bill, which outlawed racial and origin discrimination but the bill didn't actually get passed. He represented New Mexico for 27 years in the US Senate. In his early years in government he served on the state legislature where he fought to provide textbooks for public school children. After his service in the Senate, New Mexico honored him with a statue which is on display in the US Capitol.

=== 1960–1970 ===
==== Reies Lopez Tijerina ====
Reies Lopez Tijerina was considered a radical figure in the Chicano movement. Tijerina as a child attended an Assemblies of God institute near El Paso, Texas. In 1957 he fled to New Mexico where he fought for the land he believed belonged to Mexican American's and wanted to convince the federal government to honor the treaty of Guadalupe Hidalgo and the Universal Declaration of Human Rights. In February 1963 Tijerina created La Alianza Federale de Mercedes. La Alianza garnered national attention when they occupied the Eco Amphitheater and arrested two forest rangers for trespassing. Tijerina was arrested for assault but then released on bond. La Alianza members then raided the local court house and attempted to perform a citizen's arrest on a district attorney. This incident ended in violence. When Tijerina was put on trial he was acquitted of his charges. He was eventually arrested in 1970 and never regained the same degree of influence.

==== Corky Gonzales ====
Corky Gonzales was a famous Latino boxer who was very influential amongst Chicano youth in the 60's and 70's. He is well known for his crusade for justice in the Denver school system and organized the Denver high school "walkouts" in 1967. He is also the author of the novel I am Joaquin where he laid out the framework for his rhetoric regarding Chicano Nationalism and the idea of the Southwest region of the United States as "Aztlan". In 1965 he was appointed director of Denver's War on Poverty. Gonzales represented the crusade for justice throughout the nation as he organized and called Chicanos to action. In 1970 he formed The Colorado La Raza Unida Party.

==== Cesar Chavez ====
Cesar Chavez was one of four major leaders of the Chicano Movement. He was raised a migrant farmworker and served in WWII. After the war was over he dedicated his life to public service. He was dedicated to helping farm workers unionize through nonviolent methods. One of his early victories came from his strike against the Rose industry. He led a number of other marches and huger strikes in an attempt to improve the labor conditions and wages for the working class. He created the United Farm Workers which saw great success at first but later suffered from disloyalty and disorganization.

==== Dolores Huerta ====
Dolores Huerta was a school teacher who became interested in the rights of Latino Farm workers. She joined the CSO where she met Chaves and eventually helped him found the UFW. She became the first woman to take part in leading a major labor association.

==== Luis Valdez ====
Luis Valdez founded El Teatro Campesino, which is the first farm workers theater in Delano, CA where the actors educated and entertained workers on their civil rights. He was a playwright, producer, and director, and was heavily inspired by Cesar Chavez. His 1978 play "Zoot Suit", was based on the 1943 Zoot Suit Riots in Los Angeles. "Zoot Suit" was the first Chicano play to be performed on Broadway.

==== Lupe Anguiano ====
Lupe Anguiano has been a dedicated leader in both the civil rights and feminist movements. In 1966 she was appointed by President Lyndon B. Johnson to create a Mexican American unit in the department of Health, Education and Welfare. Anguiano monitored several affirmative action programs in her position at the HEW and she strongly advocated for bilingual education. Anguiano helped write the Bilingual Education Act, which was passed by congress in 1968. Eventually Anguiano resigned her position in the HEW and joined the UFW with Chavez where she held several leadership roles.

=== 1970–1980 ===
==== José Ángel Gutiérrez ====
José Ángel Gutiérrez founded the Raza Unida Party in 1970 as a new political entity. In September 1972 he was elected as the Raza Unida Party's national chairman. In 1984 he unsuccessfully ran for State Representative of Oregon. He founded the Center for Mexican American Studies at the University of Texas at Arlington in 1994 and served as the director.

=== 1980–1990 ===
==== Lauro Cavazos ====
Lauro Cavazos was appointed as Secretary of Education by President Ronald Reagan. He was the first Latino to be appointed to a presidential cabinet. He resigned in December 1990 due to an investigation regarding the improper use of frequent flyer miles. After his resignation he returned to Tufts university to work as a faculty member.

==== Ileana Ros-Lehtinen ====
Ileana Ros-Lehtinen was the first Latina woman elected to the US house of Representatives; in 1986 she became the first Hispanic woman in the Florida Senate. In 1989 she became the first Hispanic woman elected to Congress as well as becoming the first Cuban-American in Congress. In the Florida Senate she sponsored legislation for the "Florida Pre-Paid College Tuition Program".

== Important achievements and milestones in the fight for Latino civil rights ==
=== 1910–1920 ===
==== The Jones-Shafroth Act ====
The Jones-Shafroth act was signed by President Woodrow Wilson in 1917 and granted full U.S. citizenship to Puerto Ricans born on the island and gives them the right to travel freely to the Continental United States. However, the act also stated that because Puerto Rico was not a state, Puerto Ricans were to be represented in Congress by a delegate with limited powers and did not receive Senate representation.

==== Constitution of New Mexico ====
In 1910 New Mexicans held a constitutional conventions that created a document, which was approved in 1912 when New Mexico became a state. Many of the constitution's provisions reflected Hispano's immense desire for protection against losing land through litigation/fraud, government seizure and tax delinquencies. They also wanted protection against the racial and ethnic prejudice they faced as Hispanics in the US. The convention was successful in achieving some political power. For example, Articles II and XII made New Mexico a bilingual state and put English and Spanish on an equal basis for all state businesses.

=== 1940–1950 ===
==== Mendez V. Westminster ====
Mendez v. Westminster was a 1946 federal court case that challenged racial segregation in the Orange County, California school district. Five Mexican-American fathers challenged the practice of school segregation in the U.S. District Court in Los Angeles. The court ruled in favor of Mendez and the co-plaintiffs on February 18, 1946, and found that segregated schools were an unconstitutional denial of equal protection. Segregation in those districts ended and the rest of the state of CA eventually followed.

==== Delgado V. The Bastrop Independent School District ====
After World War II, the League of United Latin American Citizens filed a lawsuit in Texas to eliminate educational segregation of Mexican-American children in school systems. In June 1948, the federal court in Austin stated that this kind of segregation was unconstitutional because it violated the Fourteenth Amendment. After the decision, Mexican-Americans were officially classified as white, and were no longer subject to the "separate-but-equal" doctrine. The Texas State Board of Education issued an accommodating statement of policy and instructed local school districts to abolish segregation of Mexican Americans.

=== 1960–1970 ===
==== Economic Opportunity Act of 1964 ====
President Johnson signed the Economic Opportunity Act as part of his "War on Poverty" in 1964. The act created the Volunteers in Service to America (VISTA) and the Job Corps. VISTA assigned volunteers to low-income areas to engage in community-action projects. The Job Corps recruited young people who were natives to their area to work on the public projects. Both programs helped Mexican Americans improve both their economic and social positions in the community.

==== Equal Employment Opportunity Commission ====
The Equal Employment Opportunity Commission was founded in 1964 as a corollary to the Civil Rights Act passed by congress in 1964. The act was signed by President Lyndon B. Johnson and the EEOC was designed to prevent employment discrimination. Congress has given the EEOC the authority to investigate discrimination claims, create conciliation programs, create voluntary assistance programs and file lawsuits. The agency is still in existence today and continues to enforce a range of federal statutes, which prohibit employment discrimination.

==== Elementary and Secondary Education Act ====
The Elementary and Secondary Education act of 1965 authorized federal funding as part of the mandate of the 1964 Civil Rights Act. The funds were allocated for school districts that were actively striving to raise the achievement level of youths from disadvantaged backgrounds including students whose first language was not English. Throughout the country, Hispanic community groups, which represented this population started urging local education officials to take advantage of the funding in order to improve the schooling opportunities for Hispanic children.

==== Albuquerque Walkout ====
In 1966 fifty Mexican American delegates followed the lead of Albert Pena and walked out of a federal Equal Employment Opportunity Commission hearing in New Mexico. The walk out was in protest of the fact that there were no Mexican American commissioners on the EEOC and they demanded that President Lyndon B. Johnson host a White House conference on Mexican American problems. In May the President agreed to meet with Chicano leaders at a conference in El Paso. The Albuquerque Walkout was considered a huge milestone in the Chicano fight for civil rights and is even seen as marking the beginning of the Chicano Movement.

==== The Bilingual Education Act of 1968 ====
In 1967 Senator Ralph Yarborough of Texas was concerned with the academic performance of Spanish-speaking children and proposed the Bilingual Education Act, which was signed by president Lyndon B. Johnson on January 2, 1968. It was the first Federal Legislation to address the unique educational needs of students with limited English speaking ability. The act provided funding to school districts to develop bilingual education programs. Furthermore, it set the stage for further legislation regarding equality of education for language minorities.

=== 1970–1980 ===
==== Equal Educational Opportunity Act of 1974 ====
Congress passed the Equal Educational Opportunity Act of 1974 to make bilingual education more widely available in public schools. The EEOA prohibits discrimination against faculty, staff, and students, including racial segregation of students, and requires school districts to take action to overcome barriers to students' equal participation.

==== Expanding the U.S. Voting Rights Act ====
In 1975 Congress voted to expand the U.S. Voting Rights act, which was passed in 1965. The 975 amendments to the act expanded voting rights for minority groups that had traditionally fallen outside the Act's protections. Civil rights organizations representing Hispanic Americans and other minority groups argued that these groups faced discriminatory voting practices because English was not their dominant language. Thus, the act helped establish the requirement of language assistance at polling locations.

=== 1980–1990 ===
==== Plyler v. Doe ====
Plyler v. Doe was a U.S. Supreme Court case regarding the right of free education for illegal immigrants in Texas. In October 1980, a federal appeals court upheld the district court's ruling that charging tuition to children who did not have permanent immigration status was unconstitutional. In 1982, the Supreme Court also ruled that children of illegal immigrants have the right to free public schooling. According to the decision, by treating undocumented children differently, the school district violated the Equal Protection Clause of the Fourteenth Amendment.
