= French destroyer Fauconneau =

Destroyer of the French Navy

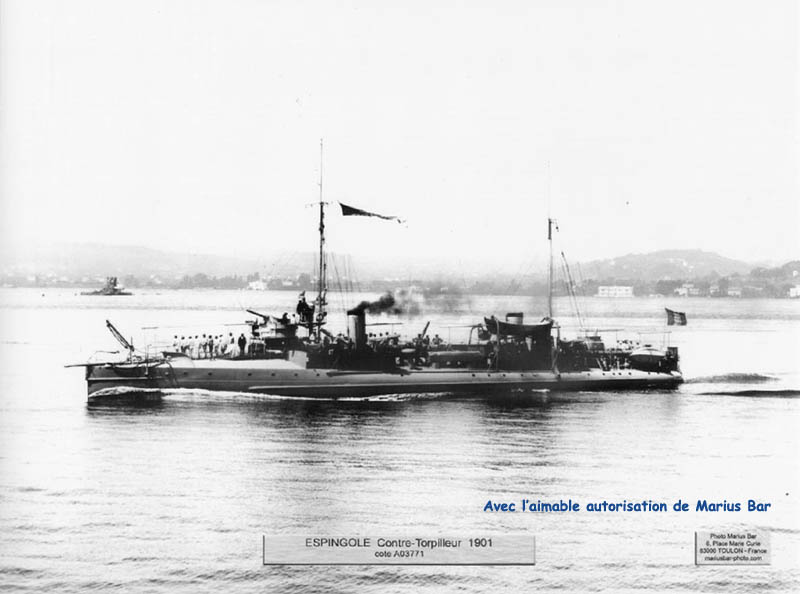
- Sister ship Espingole moving at slow speed in harbor

History

France
- Name: Fauconneau
- Namesake: Falconet
- Ordered: 1896
- Builder: Chantiers et Ateliers Augustin Normand, Le Havre
- Launched: 2 April 1900
- Stricken: 15 January 1921
- Fate: Sold for scrap, 20 April 1921

General characteristics
- Class & type: Durandal-class destroyer
- Displacement: 311 t (306 long tons)
- Length: 57.64 m (189 ft 1 in)
- Beam: 6.3 m (20 ft 8 in)
- Draft: 3.2 m (10 ft 6 in)
- Depth: 4.1 m (13 ft 5 in)
- Installed power: 2 × Normand boilers; 5,200 PS (3,800 kW)
- Propulsion: 2 × Shafts; 2 × Triple-expansion steam engines
- Speed: 26 knots (48 km/h; 30 mph)
- Range: 2,300 nmi (4,300 km; 2,600 mi) at 10 knots (19 km/h; 12 mph)
- Complement: 52 officers and enlisted men
- Armament: 1 × 65 mm (2.6 in) gun; 6 × 47 mm (1.9 in) guns; 2 × 381 mm (15 in) torpedo tubes

Fauconneau was one of four Durandal-class destroyers built for the French Navy in the late 1890s.

== Design and description ==
The Durandals had an overall length of 57.64 meters (189 ft 1 in), a beam of 6.3 meters (20 ft 8 in), and a maximum draft of 3.2 meters (10 ft 6 in). They displaced 311 metric tons (306 long tons) at deep load. The two triple-expansion steam engines, each driving one propeller shaft, were designed to produce a total of 5,200 metric horsepower (3,825 kW), using steam provided by two Normand boilers. The ships had a designed speed of 26 knots (48 km/h; 30 mph), but Fauconneau reached 27.14 knots (50.26 km/h; 31.23 mph) during her sea trials. The ships carried enough coal to give them a range of 2,300 nautical miles (4,300 km; 2,600 mi) at 10 knots (19 km/h; 12 mph). Their original complement consisted of four officers and forty-eight enlisted men, but the number of enlisted men increased to sixty in 1899.

The Durandal-class ships were armed with a single 65-millimeter (2.6 in) gun forward of the bridge and six 47-millimeter (1.9 in) Hotchkiss guns, three on each broadside. They were fitted with two single 381-millimeter (15 in) torpedo tubes, one between the funnels and the other on the stern. Two reload torpedoes were also carried; their air flasks, however, had to be charged before they could be used, a process that took several hours. The Modèle 1887 torpedo that they used had a warhead weight of 42 kilograms (93 lb).

== Construction and career ==
Fauconneau was ordered from Chantiers et Ateliers Augustin Normand on 14 April 1897 and was laid down on 29 April at its shipyard in Le Havre. The ship was launched on 2 April 1900 and conducted her sea trials in May–July. She was commissioned upon their conclusion and assigned to the Northern Squadron.

When the First World War began in August 1914, Fauconneau was one of the leaders (divisionnaire) in the 1st Submarine Flotilla (1^{ère} escadrille sous-marins) of the 2nd Light Squadron (2^{e} escadre légère) based at Cherbourg.

== Bibliography ==
- Campbell, N. J. M. (1979). "France". In Chesneau, Roger & Kolesnik, Eugene M. (eds.). Conway's All the World's Fighting Ships 1860–1905. Greenwich: Conway Maritime Press. pp. 283–333. ISBN 0-8317-0302-4.
- Caresse, Philippe (2013). "The Unlucky Destroyer Espignole". In Jordan, John (ed.). Warship 2013. London: Conway. ISBN 978-1-84486-205-4.
- Couhat, Jean Labayle (1974). French Warships of World War I. London: Ian Allan. ISBN 0-7110-0445-5.
- Garier, Gérard (2002). L'odyssée technique et humaine du sous-marin en France [The Technical and Human Odyssey of the Submarine in France: Put to the Test by the Great War] (in French). Vol. 3, part 2: A l'épreuve de la Grande Guerre. Nantes: Marines éditions. ISBN 2-909675-81-5.
- Prévoteaux, Gérard (2017). La marine française dans la Grande guerre: les combattants oubliés: Tome I 1914–1915 [The French Navy during the Great War: The Forgotten Combatants, Book I 1914–1915]. Collection Navires & Histoire des Marines du Mond. Vol. 23. Le Vigen, France: Éditions Lela presse. ISBN 978-2-37468-000-2.
- Prévoteaux, Gérard (2017). La marine française dans la Grande guerre: les combattants oubliés: Tome II 1916–1918 [The French Navy during the Great War: The Forgotten Combatants, Book II 1916–1918]. Collection Navires & Histoire des Marines du Mond. Vol. 27. Le Vigen, France: Éditions Lela presse. ISBN 978-2-37468-001-9.
- Roberts, Stephen S. (2021). French Warships in the Age of Steam 1859–1914: Design, Construction, Careers and Fates. Barnsley, UK: Seaforth Publishing. ISBN 978-1-5267-4533-0.
