= December 1902 =

Month in 1902

<<	December 1902					>>
Su	Mo	Tu	We	Th	Fr	Sa
	1	2	3	4	5	6
7	8	9	10	11	12	13
14	15	16	17	18	19	20
21	22	23	24	25	26	27
28	29	30	31

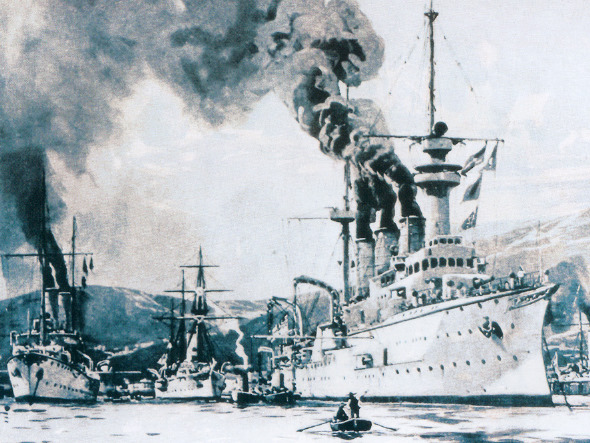
December 9, 1902: Britain, Germany and Italy begin blockade of Venezuelan ports to collect debts

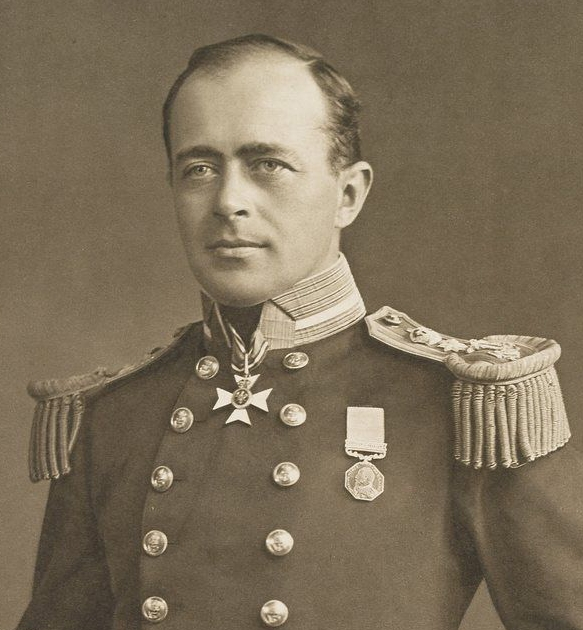
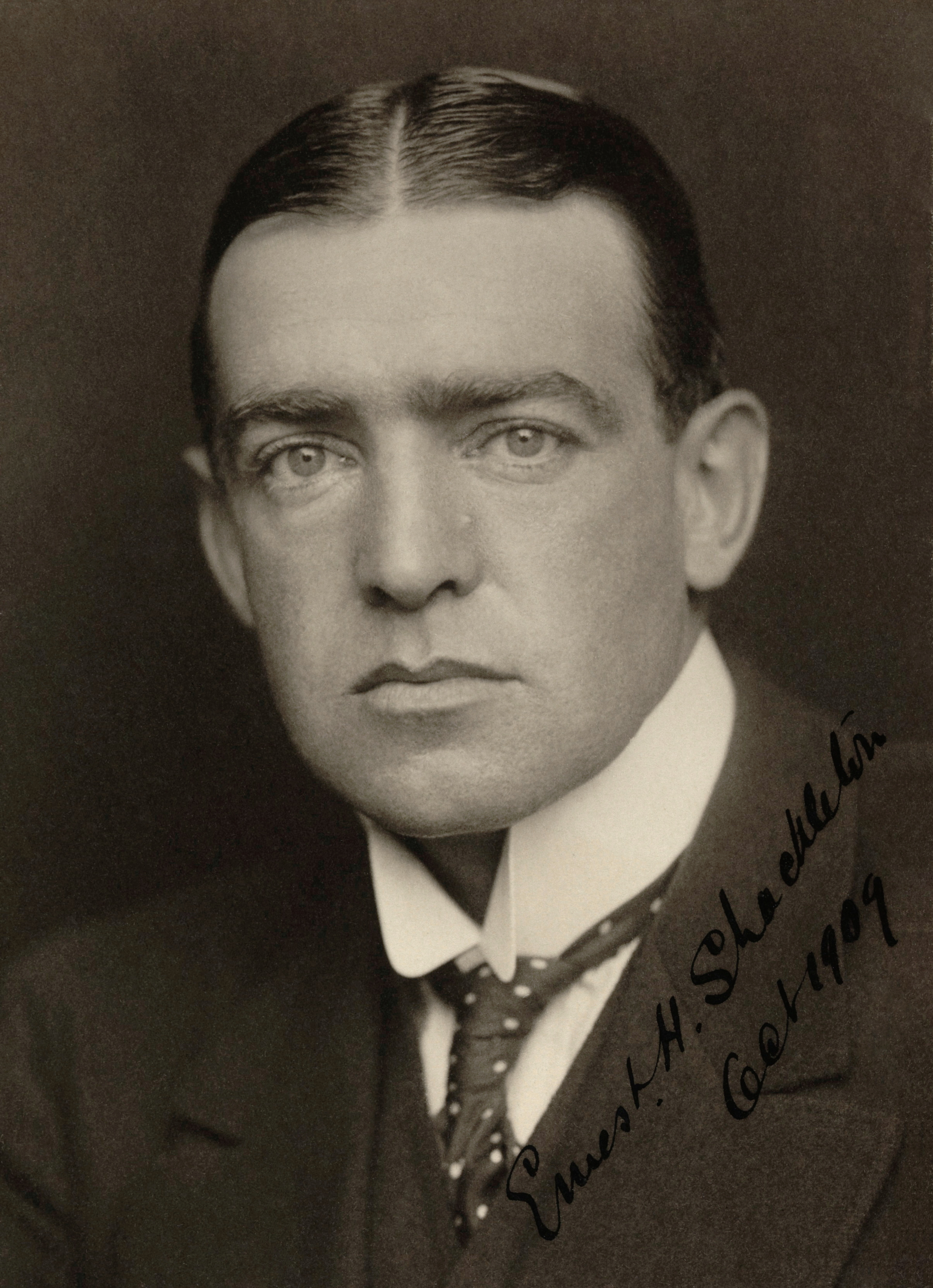
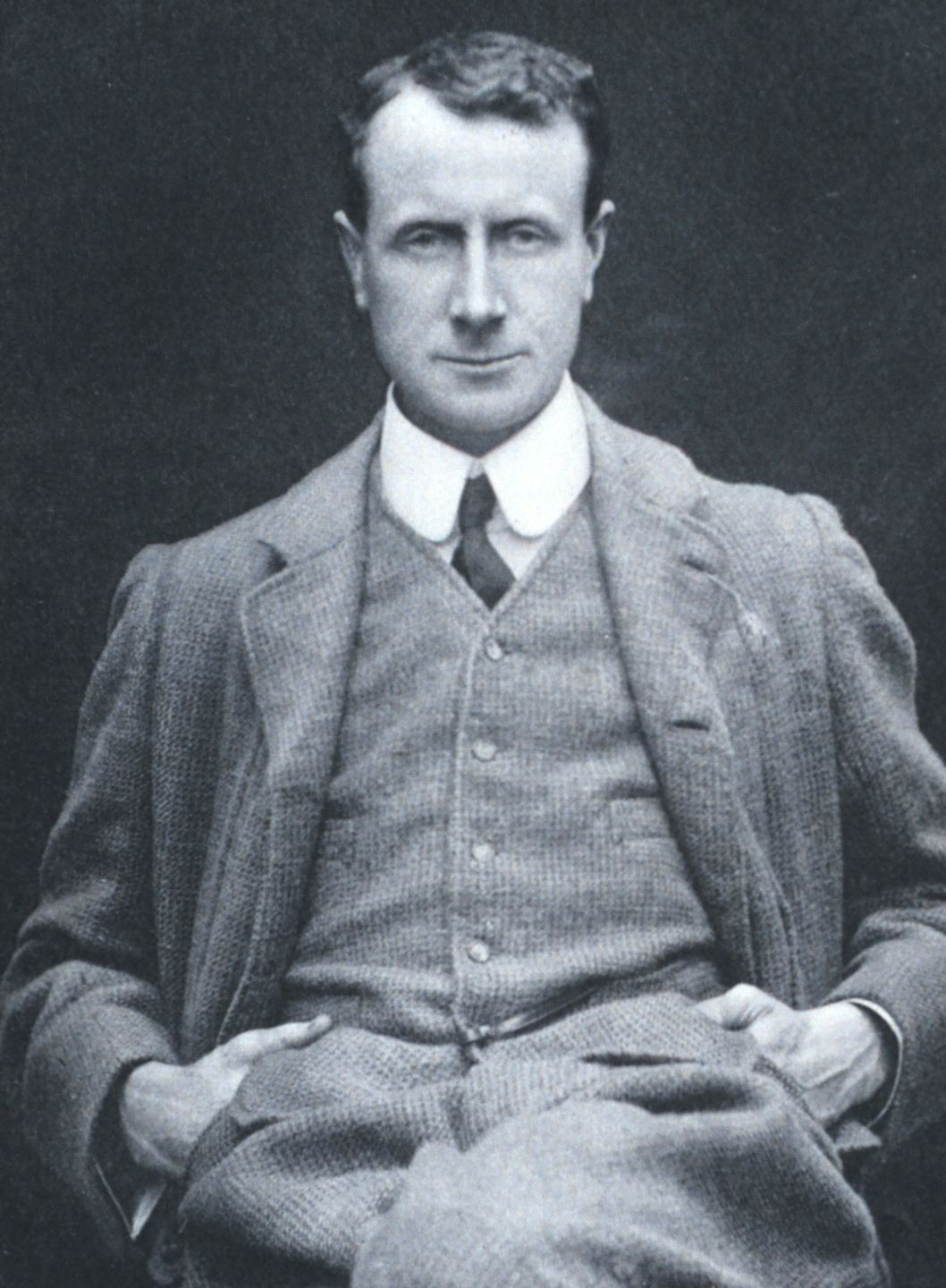
December 30, 1902: Scott, Shackleton, and Wilson reach further south than anyone in history

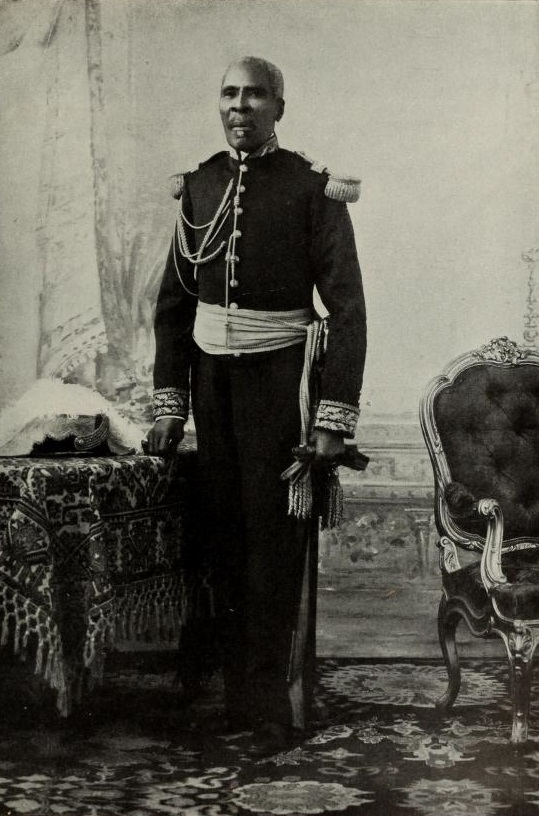
December 21, 1902: 82-year old General Alexis leads coup to overthrow government of Haiti

The following events occurred in December 1902:

== December 1, 1902 (Monday) ==
- Alexandros Zaimis resigned as Prime Minister of Greece, along with his entire cabinet, after his supporters' overwhelming defeat in the November 17 parliamentary elections.
- Danish composer Carl Nielsen conducted the premiėre of his Symphony No. 2, The Four Temperaments, for the Danish Concert Association in Copenhagen.
- Denver, Colorado, became a consolidated city-county.
- The Los Angeles mayoral election was won by the incumbent mayor, Democrat Meredith P. Snyder.

== December 2, 1902 (Tuesday) ==
- U.S. President Theodore Roosevelt's State of the Union message was read to both the Senate and the House of Representatives on the day after the opening of the second session of the 57th U.S. Congress.
- A small marble box was buried underneath a floor slab during the renovation of the White House. The box, which contained three Washington, D.C., newspapers, 27 cents and the label from a bottle of Maryland rye whiskey, would be discovered 47 years later, during White House renovations, on January 6, 1950.
- Died: Count Richard Belcredi, 79, former Prime minister of the Austrian Empire (b. 1823)

== December 3, 1902 (Wednesday) ==
- The British House of Commons voted 246 to 123 to pass the education bill.
- José Paranhos was appointed Brazil's Minister of Foreign Affairs. He would be the longest-serving foreign minister in the history of Brazil.
- Born: Mitsuo Fuchida, Japanese aviator, naval officer, and Christian evangelist; in Katsuragi, Nara Prefecture, Japan (d. 1976)
- Died:
  - Robert Lawson, 69, New Zealand architect (b. 1833)
  - Prudente de Morais, 61, third President of Brazil (b. 1841)

== December 4, 1902 (Thursday) ==
- France's Chamber of Deputies ratified the monetary convention between France, Italy, Belgium and Switzerland, authorizing each nation to issue $2,500,000 additional silver coins.
- A fire at a hotel in Chicago killed 14 people.
- Died: Charles Dow, 51, American journalist, co-founder of Dow Jones & Company (b. 1851)

== December 5, 1902 (Friday) ==
- The first performance of Leo Tolstoy's play The Power of Darkness (Власть тьмы, Vlast' t'my, written in 1886) was given at the Moscow Art Theatre, with Konstantin Stanislavski as Mitrich.
- Born: Strom Thurmond, American politician who served as U.S. Senator for South Carolina for decades, in Edgefield, South Carolina (d. 2003)

== December 6, 1902 (Saturday) ==
- Theodoros Deligiannis formed a cabinet as the new Prime Minister of Greece.
- Francisco Silvela formed a cabinet as Prime Minister of Spain, replacing Práxedes Sagasta. Silvela had previously served as Premier from 1899 to 1900.

== December 7, 1902 (Sunday) ==
- Died: Thomas Nast, 62, German-American caricaturist and cartoonist, died after having contracted yellow fever in Ecuador (b. 1840)

== December 8, 1902 (Monday) ==
- Arthur Balfour, Prime Minister of the United Kingdom, established the Committee of Imperial Defence.
- The day before a blockade of Venezuela's ports was to begin, the British ambassador, W. H. D. Haggard, and the German charge d'affaires broke diplomatic relations, closed their embassies, and departed the country.
- Regular train service began in Cuba between Havana and Santiago de Cuba.
- Born: Wifredo Lam, Cuban artist, in Sagua La Grande, Cuba (d. 1982)

== December 9, 1902 (Tuesday) ==
- The "Venezuelan Crisis" began when a naval blockade of Venezuela was imposed by Western European powers, after President Cipriano Castro's refusal to pay foreign debts and recompense European citizens for losses incurred in the Federal War. British and German warships sailed into the port of La Guaira, seized four Venezuelan warships and scuttled three of them. The act of aggression presented a challenge to U.S. President Roosevelt and to the Monroe Doctrine of preventing incursions by European powers against nations in the Western Hemisphere. Venezuelan police began the arrest of British and German citizens within Venezuela.
- Born: Margaret Hamilton, American film and TV actress; in Cleveland, Ohio (d. 1985)

== December 10, 1902 (Wednesday) ==
- Construction of the Aswan Low Dam on the Nile was completed with the opening of the dam and reservoir.
- British and German warships expanded their blockade of the Venezuelan coast and intercepted a Venezuelan gunboat at Port of Spain in Trinidad. On the demand of Herbert W. Bowen, the U.S. Minister to Venezuela, President Cipriano Castro released the British and German subjects arrested the day before.

== December 11, 1902 (Thursday) ==
- Ludwig Forrer was elected a member of the Swiss Federal Council.
- At the Venezuelan city of Puerto Cabello, the British and German consuls were arrested by police.

== December 12, 1902 (Friday) ==
- The Hokkaido Railway Company opened Ranshima Station on the Hakodate Main Line in Otaru, Hokkaido, Japan.
- Representatives of the U.S. and Cuba signed a reciprocity treaty at Havana.
- Born: Koloman Sokol, Slovak artist; in Liptovský Mikuláš, German Empire (d. 2003)

== December 13, 1902 (Saturday) ==
- As the Venezuelan crisis continued, the British merchant ship Topaze was boarded by a mob and its crew arrested by the Venezuelan Navy. When no apology was forthcoming, the British battle cruiser Charybdis and the German cruiser Vineta began the bombardment of Venezuelan forts at Puerto Cabello.
- U.S. Congressman David A. De Armond of Missouri introduced a proposal for a constitutional amendment to delay the presidential inauguration day from March 4 to April 30, and to have Congress assemble on January 8 rather than the first Monday in December.

== December 14, 1902 (Sunday) ==
- Germany's Reichstag voted, 202 to 100, to approve the tariff bill. The upper house, the Bundesrath, approved the bill unchanged four days later.
- Born: Frances Bavier, American stage and television actress known for portraying "Aunt Bee" on The Andy Griffith Show; in New York City (d. 1989)
- Died: Julia Grant, 76, First Lady of the United States from 1869 to 1877 as wife of U.S. President Ulysses S. Grant (b. 1826)

== December 15, 1902 (Monday) ==
- From Canada at Glace Bay in Nova Scotia, Guglielmo Marconi transmitted the first transatlantic wireless radio press report to a receiving station at Cornwall in England.

== December 16, 1902 (Tuesday) ==
- A 6.4 magnitude earthquake killed 4,880 people and destroyed over 40,000 homes in the Andijan Province of what is now Uzbekistan.
- By unanimous vote, the U.S. Senate ratified the treaty with Spain to end the Spanish-American War.
- Venezuela offered to submit to independent arbitration of the debts owed to the UK and to Germany, and the U.S. Department of State urged the European powers to agree to the settlement.

== December 17, 1902 (Wednesday) ==
- Britain's Prime Minister Balfour announced that a state of war existed between the United Kingdom and Venezuela.
- Eleven sailors were killed when the schooners Frank A. Palmer and Louise B. Crary collided during a gale and sank in the Atlantic Ocean off the coast of Gloucester, Massachusetts. Only 10 people survived.

== December 18, 1902 (Thursday) ==
- The British House of Lords was prorogued by King Edward VII at the request of Prime Minister Balfour.

== December 19, 1902 (Friday) ==
- Lord Hawke's cricket team, representing England, played the first match of its tour of New Zealand at Auckland, defeating a local side.
- Arthur Lynch, one of the Irish members of the House of Commons of the UK, was indicted for treason.
- The British Empire annexed the uninhabited South Pacific atoll of Ducie Island.
- Died: Henry Verney, 18th Baron Willoughby de Broke, 58, British peer (b. 1844)

== December 20, 1902 (Saturday) ==
- Britain, Germany and Italy agreed to submit their claims against Venezuela for arbitration by The Hague tribunal, subject to the condition that U.S. President Roosevelt acted as the arbitrator.
- Born: Prince George, Duke of Kent, son of the future King George V of the United Kingdom and Queen Mary, at York Cottage, Norfolk (d. 1942)

== December 21, 1902 (Sunday) ==
- Pierre Nord Alexis became President of Haiti at the age of 82, following a military coup.

== December 22, 1902 (Monday) ==
- The Maori electorates of New Zealand voted in the country's general election, with four Maoris elected to the New Zealand House of Representatives.
- The U.S. Department of Agriculture ended its quarantine on cattle in the U.S. state of Connecticut.
- Died: Richard von Krafft-Ebing, 62, German sexologist (b. 1840)

== December 23, 1902 (Tuesday) ==
- Born: Norman Maclean, American author (d. 1990)
- Died: Frederick Temple, 81, English priest, Archbishop of Canterbury (b. 1821)

== December 24, 1902 (Wednesday) ==
- U.S. President Roosevelt received the formal request from the UK and Germany, asking that he become the arbitrator in the Venezuelan crisis. The next day, Venezuela agreed to arbitration by Roosevelt at the Hague, subject to a halt of the blockade of its coast and for the return of Venezuelan Navy ships seized by the European nations.

== December 25, 1902 (Thursday) ==
- Policeman Milton Hinkle of the Pittsburg, Kansas Police Department was shot and mortally wounded with his own service revolver after encountering an intoxicated group of African American miners. He would die of his injuries at 2 a.m. on December 26. In a case of mistaken identity, a lynch mob would seize Moffat Godley, an African American man, from jail and hang him, unaware that the actual suspect in Hinkle's shooting was Joe Godley, Moffat Godley's brother. Joe Godley would be arrested in Oakland, California, in April 1904, and would be tried and acquitted of Hinkle's murder.
- Born: Princess Françoise of Orléans, daughter of Prince Jean, Duke of Guise, and Princess Isabelle of Orléans, in Paris (d. 1953)
- Died:
  - Jackson Temple, 75, former associate justice of the Supreme Court of California (b. 1827)
  - Patrick F. Trainor, 39, Scottish-born American politician, member of the New York State Senate (b. 1863)

== December 26, 1902 (Friday) ==
- British-born Ada Evans became the first woman in Australia to obtain a degree in law.
- Brisbane, the capital of Queensland in Australia, was incorporated as a city.
- A wall collapse killed Battalion Chief Thomas A. Coppinger, Assistant Foreman William F. Jeffery and Firefighter Michael J. O'Toole of the New York City Fire Department.
- Died: Mary Hartwell Catherwood, 55, American writer, cancer (b. 1847)

== December 27, 1902 (Saturday) ==
- The Romanian Senate voted to approved an act providing for allowing Jewish residents to become naturalized citizens of Romania.

== December 28, 1902 (Sunday) ==
- Born:
  - Mortimer J. Adler, American philosopher; in New York City (d. 2001)
  - Shen Congwen, Chinese writer; in Fenghuang, China (d. 1988)

== December 29, 1902 (Monday) ==
- The coronation durbar ceremonies began in India at Delhi.
- The Sultan of Morocco barricaded himself with his guards inside his palace at Fez during an uprising by rebels.

== December 30, 1902 (Tuesday) ==
- Traveling as part of the Discovery Expedition, Robert Falcon Scott, Ernest Shackleton and Edward Adrian Wilson reached the furthest point south by human beings up to that time, arriving at the latitude of 82°S.
- France and Guatemala agreed to submit their dispute over payment to The Hague.

== December 31, 1902 (Wednesday) ==
- Wilson, Scott and Shackleton turned back to join the rest of the Discovery Expedition because of illness. Most of their sledge-dogs were dead and Shackleton was suffering from scurvy.
- The government of British India ordered the release of 16,000 prisoners in order to commemorate the coronation durbar of Edward VII as Emperor of India.
- The U.S. Steel Corporation announced a system of profit-sharing for its employees and for the workers to purchase stock in the company.
