= French destroyer Espingole =

French Durandal-class destroyer

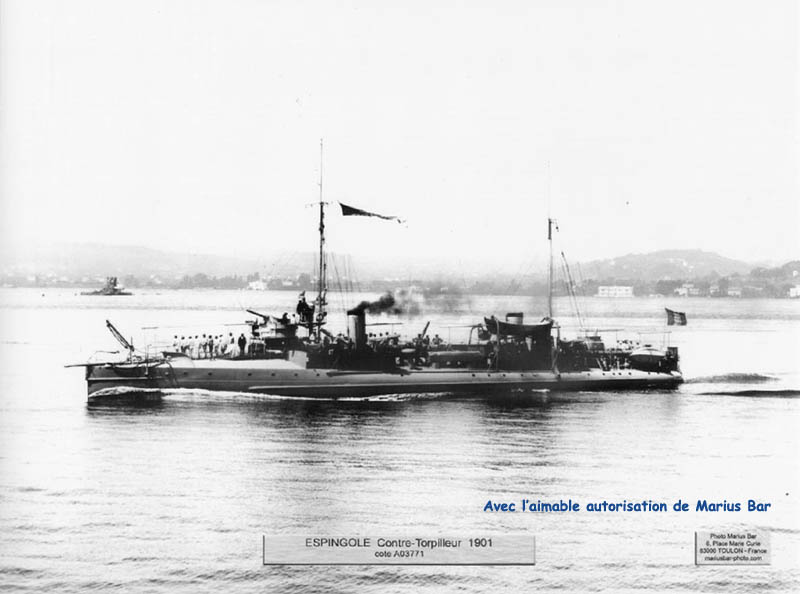
- Espingole moving at slow speed in harbor

History

France
- Name: Espingole
- Namesake: French type of blunderbuss
- Ordered: 1896
- Builder: Chantiers et Ateliers Augustin Normand, Le Havre
- Cost: ₣1,690,994
- Laid down: 1896 or 1897
- Launched: 28 June 1900
- Completed: 24 September 1900
- Stricken: 16 September 1903
- Fate: Sank after striking a rock, 4 February 1903

General characteristics
- Class & type: Durandal-class destroyer
- Displacement: 311 t (306 long tons)
- Length: 57.64 m (189 ft 1 in)
- Beam: 6.3 m (20 ft 8 in)
- Draft: 3.2 m (10 ft 6 in)
- Depth: 4.1 m (13 ft 5 in)
- Installed power: 2 × Normand boilers; 5,200 PS (3,800 kW)
- Propulsion: 2 × Shafts; 2 × Triple-expansion steam engines
- Speed: 26 knots (48 km/h; 30 mph)
- Range: 2,300 nmi (4,300 km; 2,600 mi) at 10 knots (19 km/h; 12 mph)
- Complement: 64 officers and enlisted men
- Armament: 1 × 65 mm (2.6 in) gun; 6 × 47 mm (1.9 in) guns; 2 × 381 mm (15 in) torpedo tubes

Espingole was a Durandal-class destroyer built for the French Navy in the late 1890s. Commissioned in 1900, she saw only a few years of service before running aground and sinking in 1903 off the Côte d'Azur. Her captain was acquitted at his court-martial seven years later. Multiple salvage attempts failed and a legal dispute arising from the last attempt was not settled until 1926.

== Design and description ==
Espingole had an overall length of 57.64 meters (189 ft 1 in), a beam of 6.3 meters (20 ft 8 in), and a maximum draft of 3.2 meters (10 ft 6 in). She displaced 311 metric tons (306 long tons) at deep load. The two triple-expansion steam engines, each driving one shaft, were designed to produce 5,200 metric horsepower (3,825 kW), using steam provided by two water-tube boilers. The ship had a designed speed of 26 knots (48 km/h; 30 mph), but Espingole reached 27.41 knots (50.76 km/h; 31.54 mph) during her sea trials in August and September 1900. The ship carried 37.6 metric tons (37.0 long tons) of coal, enough to give her a range of 2,300 nautical miles (4,300 km; 2,600 mi) at 10 knots (19 km/h; 12 mph). Her hull was subdivided by nine watertight transverse bulkheads. Their original complement consisted of four officers and forty-eight enlisted men, but the number of enlisted men increased to sixty in 1899.

Espingole carried a single 65-millimeter (2.6 in) gun forward of the bridge. The gun had a maximum range of 9,000 meters (9,800 yd) and a rate of fire of five rounds per minute. The ship carried 375 rounds for the gun. She also mounted six 47-millimeter (1.9 in) Hotchkiss guns, three on each broadside. The guns had a sustained rate of fire of seven rounds per minute and a maximum range of 4,000 meters (4,400 yd). She carried a total of 2,850 rounds of 47 mm ammunition. Espingole mounted two single 381-millimeter (15 in) torpedo tubes: one between the funnels and the other on the stern. Two reload torpedoes were also carried; their air flasks, however, had to be charged before they could be used, a process that took several hours. The Modèle 1887 torpedo that they used had a warhead weight of 42 kilograms (93 lb).

== Construction and career ==
The ship was laid down in 1896–1897 by Chantiers et Ateliers Augustin Normand at their Le Havre shipyard, as the last of the four Durandal-class destroyers. She was named after a French type of blunderbuss; all of the ships in her class were named after weapons. Espingole was launched on 28 June 1900 and completed around September when she ran her speed trials. Construction costs were 1,690,994 francs. She was assigned to the Mediterranean Fleet in December and made a number of port visits in France, Corsica and French North Africa throughout 1901. Her rudder was damaged after striking the bottom off Golfe-Juan and Espingole was under repair 3–27 September.

In October 1901, the 1st Battleship Division, under the command of Rear Admiral (contre-amiral) Leonce Caillard, consisting of the battleships Gaulois and Charlemagne, the armored cruiser Pothuau, and escorted by Espingole and the destroyer Epée, was ordered to proceed to the port of Mytilene on the island of Lesbos, then part by the Ottoman Empire. After Caillard landed two companies of marines that occupied the major ports of the island on 7 November, Sultan Abdul Hamid II agreed to enforce contracts made with French companies and to repay loans made by French banks. The ships made a number of port visits while they were in the Aegean, including the islands of Milos, Syros, and Tinos, in addition to the ports of Smyrna and Piraeus. The 1st Division returned to Toulon on 12 December. The ship was refitted from 3 to 17 April 1902 before she resumed her normal routine of port visits. Lieutenant (Lieutenant de vaisseau (LV)) Marcotte de Sainte-Marie relieved LV Langier in June and Espingole was refitted again from 13 November to 2 December. She made a port visit in early 1903 at Rochefort before resuming training.

The ship struck a rock in Cavalaire Bay, off Cavalaire-sur-Mer, on 4 February 1903 after straying outside the channel, and ripped a hole 2.5–3-meter (8 ft 2 in – 9 ft 10 in) in the bottom of the hull. Coal, ammunition, and two 47 mm guns were thrown overboard to lighten the ship and her sister ship Hallebarde attempted to pull her off. The hawser broke after only moving Espingole roughly 5–6 meters (16 ft 5 in – 19 ft 8 in), injuring two of Hallebarde's crewmen. Hallebarde then rescued Espingole's 62-man crew before the ship sank at coordinates 43°09′20″N 06°36′30″E. LV Marcotte de Sainte-Marie was finally acquitted at his court-martial seven years after his ship ran aground.

The initial salvage attempts were unsuccessful and the Espingole was struck off the naval register on 16 September. The navy sold her wreck at auction in December 1909 and decided to offer an escalating series of bonuses if the winner could refloat the ship and deliver it intact. The salvage company was no more successful and abandoned the effort after five months of work. The company claimed that the navy had disturbed the wreck and sued for 60,000 francs plus damages. The dispute was not settled until 3 March 1926.

== Bibliography ==
- Campbell, N. J. M. (1979). "France". In Chesneau, Roger & Kolesnik, Eugene M. (eds.). Conway's All the World's Fighting Ships 1860–1905. Greenwich: Conway Maritime Press. pp. 283–333. ISBN 0-8317-0302-4.
- Caresse, Philippe (2013). "The Unlucky Destroyer Espignole". In Jordan, John (ed.). Warship 2013. London: Conway. ISBN 978-1-84486-205-4.
- Roberts, Stephen S. (2021). French Warships in the Age of Steam 1859–1914: Design, Construction, Careers and Fates. Barnsley, UK: Seaforth Publishing. ISBN 978-1-5267-4533-0.
