= Rita Ranch =

Masterplanned community in Tucson, Arizona

Coordinates: 32.1161977°N 110.7718469°W

Rita Ranch is a masterplanned community located in southeastern Tucson, Arizona. It is served by the Vail School District. It borders the small towns of Vail and Corona de Tucson. Many military families from Davis-Monthan Air Force Base live in the area. The population was estimated at 18,925 in 2007.

== History ==
Rita Ranch is part of Esmond Station Area Development Plan created in 1986 by the City of Tucson. It was so named that in reference to the historical Esmond Train Station, which was located near the current neighborhoods of Rita Ranch. Between 1890 and 1910, the nation's growing railway system had finally reached the city of Tucson in the Arizona territory. The Southern Pacific Railroad was the first route. In the early 1900s, a rail line was established to connect Tucson to El Paso, Texas. This set of lines ran through present day Rita Ranch, and many of the undeveloped areas still have deteriorating railroad tracks that can be found today. East of the present day intersection of Houghton Road and Old Vail Road, about half a mile down the old Esmond Station Road, lie the remains of Esmond (once called Papago) and its dilapidated train depot, Esmond Station. On January 28, 1903, at 3:30 am, the eastbound Crescent City Express (No. 8) collided head-on with the westbound Pacific Coast Express (No. 7) at the present day intersection of Rita Road and Houghton, killing 14 people in what became known as the Esmond Train Wreck.
