= Esmond train wreck =

1903 train accident in Arizona, United States

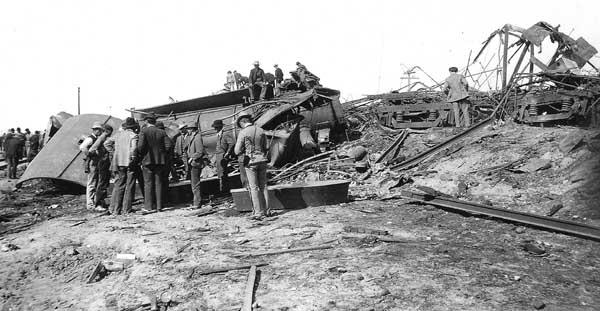
- Makeshift coffins laid out near one of two wrecked steam engines. Burned Pullman cars are to the right.

Details
- Date: 28 January 1903; 3:30 am
- Location: 9 miles (14 km) east of Tucson, Arizona (current-day Rita Ranch)
- Coordinates: 32°6′11″N 110°46′28″W
- Country: United States
- Line: Southern Pacific
- Operator: Southern Pacific
- Incident type: Head-on collision
- Cause: Failure to relay orders

Statistics
- Trains: 2
- Deaths: 14

The Esmond train wreck on January 28, 1903, 3:30 am, about 9 miles (14 km) east of present-day Tucson, Arizona, killed 14 people, including the engineers of both trains. The accident occurred when the eastbound Crescent City Express (No. 8) collided head-on with the westbound Pacific Coast Express (No. 7). Both trains were running late. A communication error was determined to be the cause of the wreck. A night operator named Clough admitted that he did not deliver a second order to Conductor Parker which instructed him to pull the Crescent City Express (No. 8), headed for New Orleans, on to the Esmond siding to allow the Pacific Coast Express (No. 7), headed for San Francisco, to pass by.

== Wreck ==
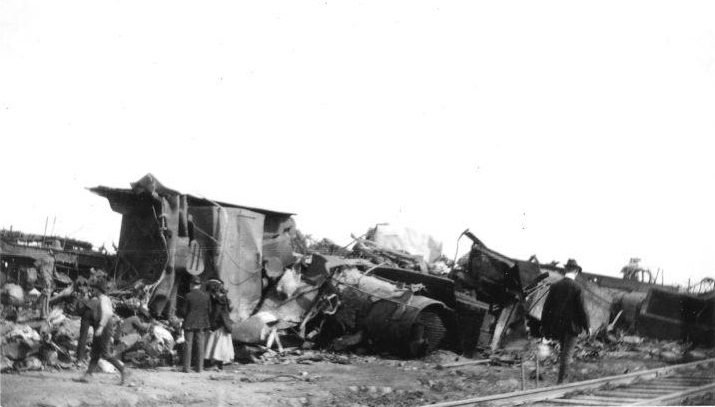
The Southern Pacific Esmond wreck on January 28, 1903.

The oil-fueled fire burned so intensely that some of the metal glowed red hot. There was no record of the number or names of passengers, making it difficult to identify some victims. Rescuers relied upon teeth, jewelry, and even a knife with initials engraved on it. The Arizona Daily Star reported on January 30:

Out on the desert, sixteen miles from the city, is the charred and smoking mass of debris which marks the spot of the fearful wreck of Wednesday morning. The wreck of Esmond will never be forgotten. On the tablets of memory, anguish, suffering and death was written ineffacably the horrors of the worst railroad disaster that has ever occurred in the Territory of Arizona.

According to one account, the westbound Pacific Coast Express was running about two hours late and stopped at the Vail Station for orders. There were two orders waiting for him: the first instructed his train to meet a freight at Wilmont (west of Esmond), and the second said to meet the eastbound Crescent City Express at Esmond. However, the conductor of the Pacific Coast Express did not receive the second order. This resulted in the two trains crashing head on.

=== Dead and injured ===
Newspaper reports attributed the crash to night operator E.F. Clough, who admitted that he had not delivered a second order to Conductor Parker that instructed him to allow train No. 8 to pass him at the Esmond siding. Clough never explained why he didn't deliver the second order. Fourteen were killed and 18 injured. A fierce fire was visible for several miles. The bodies of the engineer of No. 7 John Bruce and Fireman George McGrath of No. 7 were burned almost beyond recognition. Bruce was identified by his watch found under his body and Jack by a diamond ring at his side. The Engineer of No. 8, Wilkey, was reduced to a small pile of bones and flesh. George McGrath, the fireman on No. 7, was killed, but all of the passengers on the westbound train survived. The Arizona Daily Star reported, "The bodies of two women were found under the wreckage of the middle car. One had her hands clasped as if in great pain or in the act of supplication*. (*It is possible that this may have been Emma Booth Tucker who was a Salvation Army Officer and the daughter of the Army's Founders, Catherine and William Booth) The other body was lying aside of it near the two women was charred remains of a man. A pocket knife was found on him. The outside bore the name of P. Willard."

=== Cause ===
Both trains were running late. The westbound Pacific Coast Express was going to San Francisco. The eastbound Crescent City Express was headed for New Orleans. The Pacific Coast Express stopped at the Vail Station to pick up orders, but the Conductor failed to learn of a change that directed them to pull into the Esmond siding. The impact of the collision was so great that the last car of the eastbound train was decoupled and rolled downhill 15 miles (24 km) into Tucson. The wreck was immediately blamed on a train operator named Clough at Vail, who claimed the train conductor failed to pick up the second order. But Clough disappeared the day after the accident, casting suspicion on him. Train Superintendent C. C. Scroufe reported that Clough was most likely responsible for the wreck.

== Wreck rediscovery ==
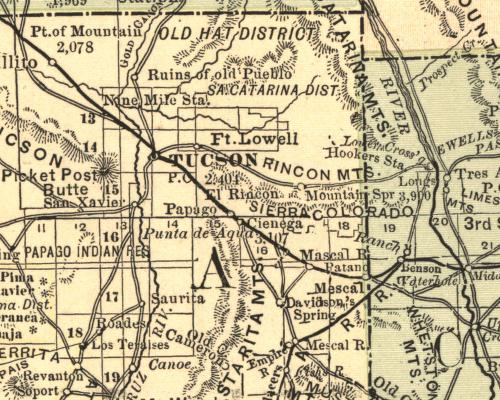
Papago Station, the site of the Esmond train wreck, on the rail line southwest of Tucson on this 1883 map.

Several local amateur historians began searching for the location of the accident in 1999. David Kemsley and Tom Zumwalde were intrigued by the name of a dirt road, “Esmond Station Road”, off Houghton Road. They found a few references to the Esmond Train Station, later renamed the Papago Train Station. The “Esmond Station Area Plan” revealed the prior existence of the Esmond Station and a train wreck.

The inventory and Plan areas are named for Esmond Station, a former railroad section station located on Rita Road about one-half mile east of Houghton Road. A head-on collision of two passenger trains occurred near this site in 1903. Portions of the original structures still remain, and the possibility of designating Esmond Station as a historic site is being investigated.

They also found a reference to it in “Railroads of Arizona: Vol. 1 The Roads of Southern Arizona" (1975), which referred to a "famous head-on collision took place about three in the morning of January 28, 1903, just west of Esmond, a station about 15 miles east of Tucson. Newspaper account initially blamed the train operator and later then conductor. Douglas Maus found a large, heavy metal strut embedded in the dirt that appeared to have been torn from one of the train engines. The researchers received input from Richard Jones who directed them to a number of photos of the wreck at the Arizona Historical Society Library.

=== Location ===
The accident occurred at the present day intersection of Rita Road and Houghton Road, Tucson AZ, about half a mile northwest of Esmond Station, previously known as the Papago Station.

== In popular culture ==
In 2004, William Kalt presented “I'll Meet You In the Cornfield: The Great Train Wreck of 1903!” at the 45th Annual Arizona History Convention in Safford, Arizona. The book Tucson Was a Railroad Town includes a chapter about the train wreck. In 2013, the Vail Unified School District named a new school the Esmond Station Elementary School. The Esmond Station Regional Park was scheduled to be constructed in 2015.

In September, 2002, the Pyramid Credit Union sought help from the researchers to help create a memorial for the train wreck that occurred at the location of their building. A plaque was placed by the Pyramid Credit Union near the site of the accident. It reads:

Esmond Train Wreck Site On January 28, 1903, an unknown number of passengers were killed as two Southern Pacific trains collided head-on at about 3 a.m. The plaque is dedicated to the memory of all those who lost their lives in the fiery wreck. Donated by Lewis Wagoner, Pyramid Credit Union And members of the Rita Ranch community.

Songwriter Michael Crownheart composed and recorded Wreck of Esmond.
