= French destroyer Durandal =

Destroyer of the French Navy

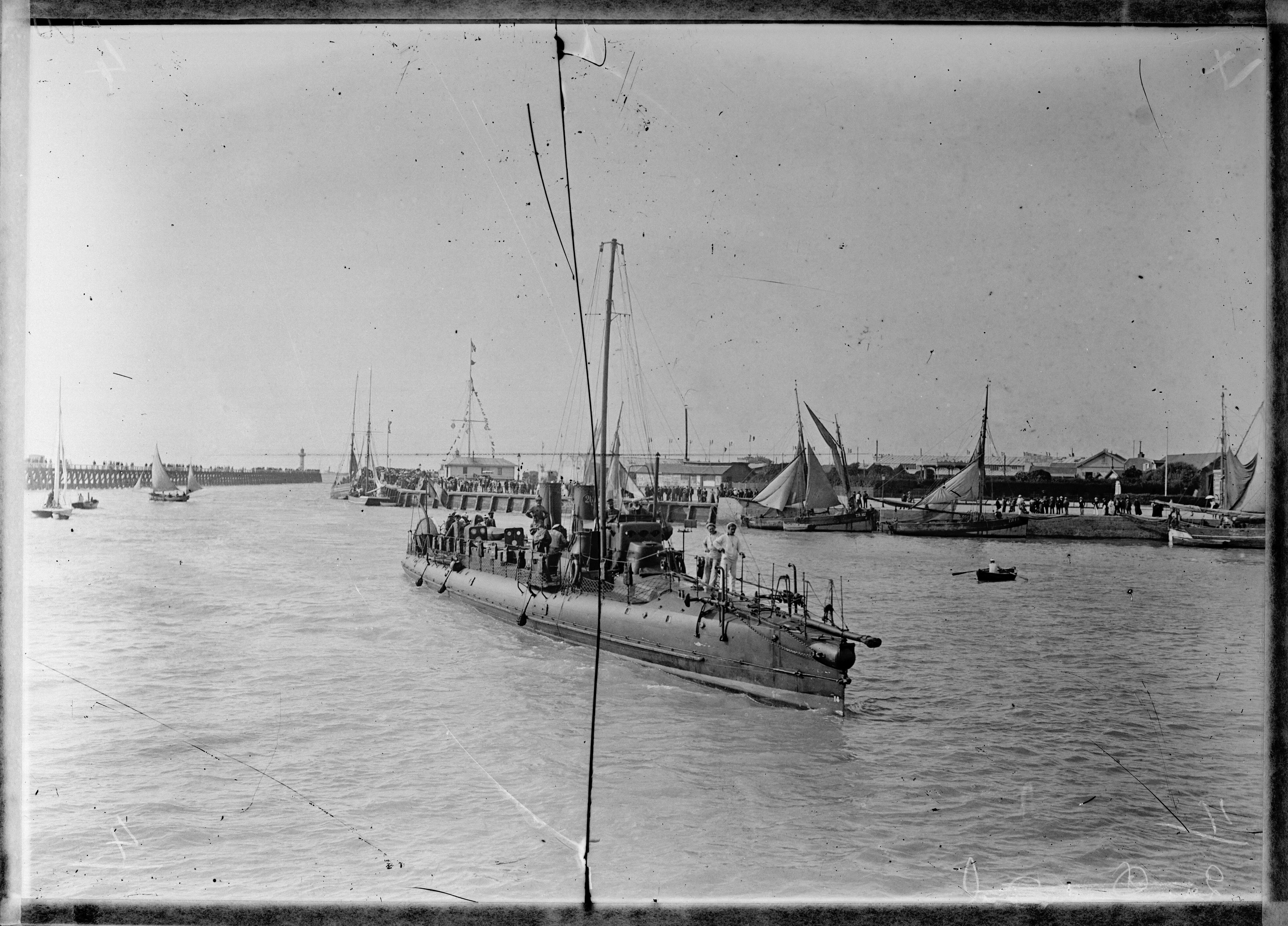
- Durandal in harbour in the 1900s

History

France
- Name: Durandal
- Namesake: Durendal
- Ordered: 25 August 1896
- Builder: Chantiers et Ateliers Augustin Normand, Le Havre
- Launched: 11 February 1899
- Stricken: 7 April 1919
- Fate: Sold for scrap, 22 February 1921

General characteristics
- Class & type: Durandal-class destroyer
- Displacement: 301 t (296 long tons)
- Length: 57.64 m (189 ft 1 in)
- Beam: 6.3 m (20 ft 8 in)
- Draft: 3.2 m (10 ft 6 in)
- Depth: 4.1 m (13 ft 5 in)
- Installed power: 5,200 PS (3,800 kW); 2 × Water-tube boilers
- Propulsion: 2 × Shafts; 2 × Triple-expansion steam engines
- Speed: 26 knots (48 km/h; 30 mph)
- Range: 2,300 nmi (4,300 km; 2,600 mi) at 10 knots (19 km/h; 12 mph)
- Complement: 64 officers and enlisted men
- Armament: 1 × 65 mm (2.6 in) gun; 6 × 47 mm (1.9 in) guns; 2 × 381 mm (15.0 in) torpedo tubes

Durandal was the name ship of her class of four destroyers built for the French Navy in the late 1890s.

== Design and description ==
The Durandal class was the first class of destroyers built for the French Navy, and formed part of the 300-tonne type of destroyers, of which 55 ships of similar size and layout were built between 1897 and 1908. They were designed by the French specialist builder of torpedo vessels, Chantiers et Ateliers A. Normand, based on their Filibustier-class torpedo boat design, but enlarged and with a stronger hull.

The Durandals were 57.64 m (189.1 ft) long overall and 56 m (183.7 ft) between perpendiculars, with a beam of 5.95 m (19.5 ft) and a draft of 3.20 m (10.5 ft). Displacement was 301 t (296 long tons). Like all the 300 tonne destroyers, Durandal had a "turtleback" (Note: A fore deck with exaggerated camber designed to throw off sea water at high speeds.) forecastle and a raised flying-deck aft. Two coal-fired Normand water-tube boilers fed steam to two triple-expansion steam engines rated at 4,800 ihp (3,600 kW), giving a design speed of 26 knots (48 km/h; 30 mph). Two widely separated funnels were fitted. The ships had an operating radius of 2,300 nmi (4,300 km; 2,600 mi) at 10 kn (19 km/h; 12 mph) and 217 nmi (402 km; 250 mi) at 26 knots (48 km/h; 30 mph).

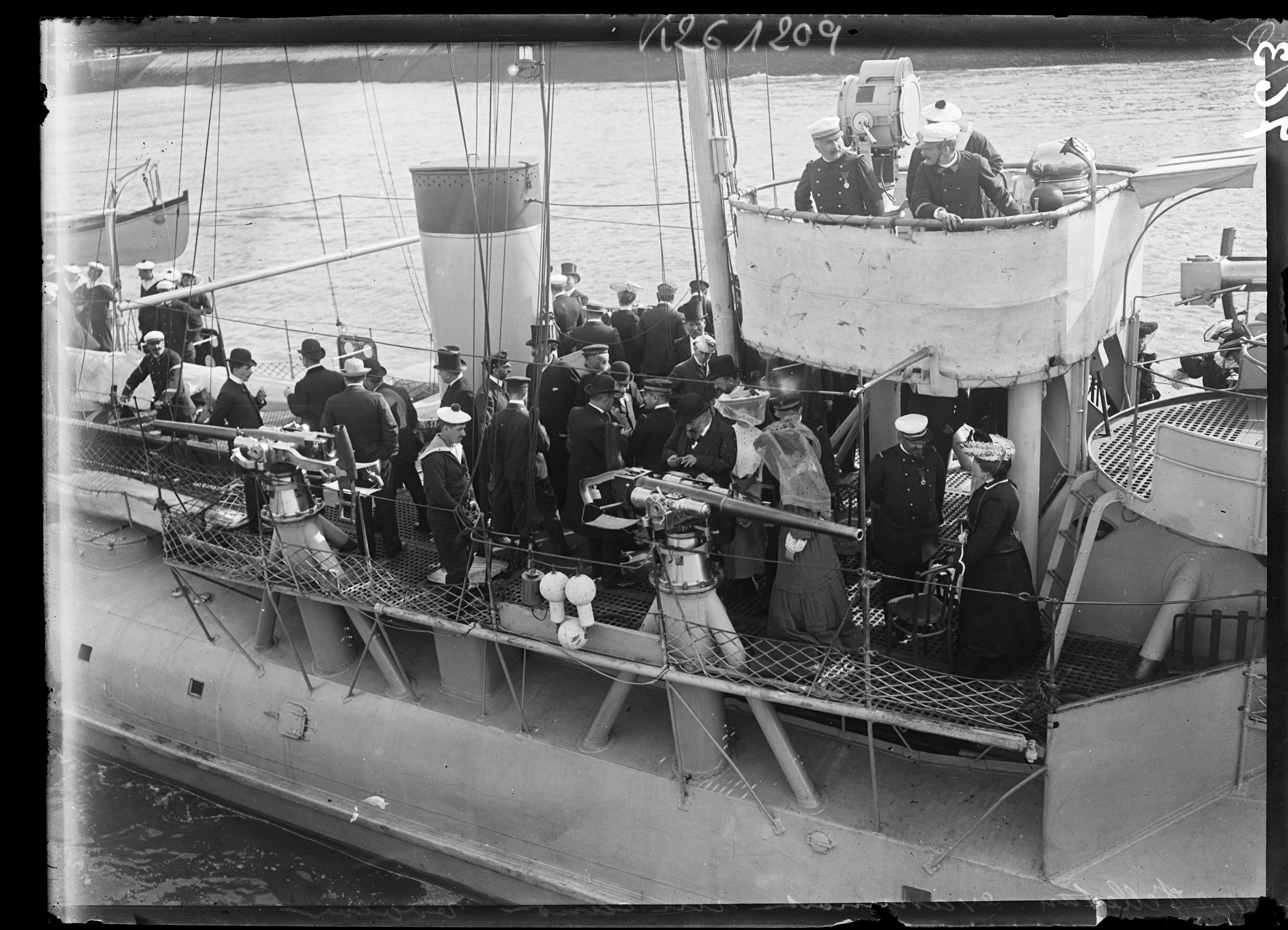
French Minister of the Navy Camille Pelletan inspecting the 47mm M1885 guns of Durandal, August 1904

Durandal had a gun armament of a single Canon de 65 mm Modèle 1891 gun on a raised platform around the ship's conning tower, and six 47 mm (1.9 in)/40 M1885 guns on the ship's beams. Two 380 mm (15 in) torpedo tubes were fitted, with two spare torpedoes carried. She had a crew of four officers and 48 sailors.

== Construction and service ==
Durandal (Durendal) was ordered from Chantiers et Ateliers Augustin Normand on 5 August 1896 and was laid down on 25 August at its shipyard in Le Havre. The ship was launched on 11 February 1899 and conducted her sea trials in April–July. She was commissioned upon their conclusion and assigned to the Northern Squadron. She reached a speed of 27.42 knots (50.78 km/h; 31.55 mph) during sea trials on 4 July 1899.

In July 1902, Durandal took part in the 1902 French naval manoeuvres in the Mediterranean.

When the First World War began in August 1914, Durandal was one of the leaders (divisionnaire) in the 2nd Submarine Flotilla (2^{ère} escadrille sous-marins) of the 2nd Light Squadron (2^{e} escadre légère) based at Cherbourg. On 12 October, Durandal, the destroyer Escopette and the auxiliary cruiser Pas de Calais (a converted paddle packet ship), engaged the German submarine U-20 off Cap Gris-Nez.

== Bibliography ==
- Brassey, T. A., ed. (1903). The Naval Annual 1903. Portsmouth, UK: J. Griffin and Co.
- Campbell, N. J. M. (1979). "France". In Chesneau, Roger & Kolesnik, Eugene M. (eds.). Conway's All the World's Fighting Ships 1860–1905. Greenwich: Conway Maritime Press. pp. 283–333. ISBN 0-8317-0302-4.
- Caresse, Philippe (2013). "The Unlucky Destroyer Espignole". In Jordan, John (ed.). Warship 2013. London: Conway. ISBN 978-1-84486-205-4.
- Couhat, Jean Labayle (1974). French Warships of World War I. London: Ian Allan. ISBN 0-7110-0445-5.
- Fock, Harald (1989). Z-Vor! Internationale Entwicklung und Kriegseinsätze von Zerstörern und Torpedobooten 1914 bis 1939 (in German). Herford, Germany: Koehlers Verlagsgesellschaft mBH. ISBN 3-7822-0207-4.
- Gardiner, Robert; Lambert, Andrew, eds. (1992). Steam, Steel & Shellfire: The Steam Warship 1815–1905. Conway's History of the Ship. London: Conway Maritime Press. ISBN 0-85177-564-0.
- Prévoteaux, Gérard (2017). La marine française dans la Grande guerre: les combattants oubliés: Tome I 1914–1915 [The French Navy during the Great War: The Forgotten Combatants, Book I 1914–1915]. Collection Navires & Histoire des Marines du Mond. Vol. 23. Le Vigen, France: Éditions Lela presse. ISBN 978-2-37468-000-2.
- Prévoteaux, Gérard (2017). La marine française dans la Grande guerre: les combattants oubliés: Tome II 1916–1918 [The French Navy during the Great War: The Forgotten Combatants, Book II 1916–1918]. Collection Navires & Histoire des Marines du Mond. Vol. 27. Le Vigen, France: Éditions Lela presse. ISBN 978-2-37468-001-9.
- Roberts, Stephen S. (2021). French Warships in the Age of Steam 1859–1914: Design, Construction, Careers and Fates. Barnsley, UK: Seaforth Publishing. ISBN 978-1-5267-4533-0.
