= 1903 Oxnard strike =

Labor rights dispute in Oxnard, California

The 1903 Oxnard strike was a labor rights dispute in the southern California coastal city of Oxnard between local landowners and the majority Japanese and Mexican labor force. The strike arrayed sugar beet growers, the American Beet Sugar Company, the grower-controlled Western Agricultural Contracting Company and local law enforcement against the Japanese-Mexican Labor Association (JMLA), a union of betabeleros, or sugar beet workers, in league with independent labor contractors and boarding student activists. The interethnic organizing of the strike would presage Oxnard Mexican and Filipino sugar beet worker participation in the California agricultural strike of 1933 and later the efforts of the United Farm Workers. The union would dissolve shortly after the strike, withdrawing their charter request made to the American Federation of Labor, with Mexican workers rejecting AFL President Samuel Gompers' demand for Japanese exclusion.

== History ==
=== Background ===
In 1887, Henry, James, Benjamin, and Robert Oxnard sold their Brooklyn sugar refinery and moved to California to capitalize on the growing agricultural economy of the late nineteenth century. In 1897, following the enactment of the Dingley Tariff Bill that heavily taxed foreign sugar, Henry, James, and Robert Oxnard formed the American Beet Sugar Company (ABSC). As the ABSC merged its operations with growers, a host of migrant laborers were recruited, with Chinese, Mexican, Japanese, Filipino, Sikh and white laborers procured in various waves. In the segregated sections of Oxnard carved out for primarily non-white workers, there was interethnic socialization: in Oxnard's Chinatown (dubbed "China Alley"), billiards halls such as "Yamaguchi's pool room" served as sites of interaction between agricultural workers of different backgrounds.

Although the seasonal Chinese and Mexican laborers already in place in the county easily satisfied agricultural labor needs early in the factory's history, decline in Chinese populations due to Chinese Exclusion Acts and use of Mexican workers in other agricultural efforts led to an increase in Japanese worker recruitment, often by San Francisco-based Japanese contractors such as Hanzo Kurihara and Kusabura Baba. Many Issei, or first-generation Japanese immigrants, moved to California as a result of Meiji-era land reforms which undermined the economic position of many smallholders in the Empire's rural prefectures, as well as political persecution. In 1898, the first Japanese work-crew was introduced by Kurihara, setting off a recruitment pattern which raised the Japanese worker population in Oxnard to a thousand the following year. By 1902 nine major Japanese contractors saw to the seasonal needs in the area. Local Japanese residents of Ventura County distinguished themselves from these seasonal laborers, characterizing them as buranke katsugi, or "blanket carriers".

By the turn of the century, the ABSC had attained substantial managerial power over growers, mandating cultivation practices and setting price and wage schedules, and now turned its attention to replacing Japanese and Mexican labor contractors. Since these contractors had already caused minor slowdowns and protests over wages, recently arrived bank owners and merchants organized an owner-interest oriented contracting company called the Western Agricultural Contracting Company (WACC). The WACC quickly replaced the Japanese contractors as principal contractors to the Oxnard Plain and even forced some of them to subcontract through the WACC. Some historians have argued the adeptness of the keiyaku-nin—bilingual Japanese labor contractors—at winning high-wage contracts was a significant factor in triggering the WACC's formation.

This process also adversely affected farmworkers as the WACC charged a fee for subcontracting beneath them. The WACC regularly refused to pay laborers in cash and instead compensated them with credit for company stores which often sold goods at unreasonably high prices. Making up more than 90 percent of the work force, the WACC had a near monopoly of the workers. The WACC comprised two distinct departments, one tasked with the oversight of Japanese laborers and labor contractors and another tasked with the oversight of Mexican laborers and labor contractors. Workers under both of these departments were displeased by the conduct of the WACC. As a result, a large group of Japanese farmworkers and labor contractors organized a meeting at the beginning of February 1903 where they discussed their outrage at the working conditions and low wages under the WACC.

=== The strike and the JMLA ===
On February 11, 1903, 500 Japanese and 200 Mexican laborers became the charter members of the Japanese-Mexican Labor Association (JMLA) joined and formed their organization based on the grievances of the Oxnard laborers. Despite its status as a farmworker's labor union, the members of the JMLA were laborers working under contract, labor contractors, and temporary workers - many of whom were students from Japan. Some union leaders, particularly boarding students, may have been influenced by the socialist movement in Japan. Many Oxnard Issei had arrived from San Francisco and Oakland, where there existed at least two documented Japanese socialist groups, a political tendency which had gained traction in Japan in the wake of the first Sino-Japanese War (1894-95).

Many Japanese and Mexican labor contractors, holding their own grievances against the WACC, backed the JMLA, historically unusual insofar as labor contractors have typically served as suppliers of strikebreakers for employers. The JMLA is notable for being the first major agricultural union in California to unite agricultural workers of different minority groups. Whereas race/caste relations between white, Black and Indian populations had attained a degree of fixity in much of the United States due to factors like racial slavery and indigenous dispossession, the "racial" dynamics of Mexican, Chinese, Japanese and white populations in the latter half of the nineteenth century following the Mexican-American War and the colonization of California were comparatively "unscripted", i.e. not as hardened as in the case of a predeterminate white/Indian or white/Black binary.

Union leaders employed interpreters to overcome linguistic barriers during strategy sessions, translating Spanish and Japanese while using English as a middle-ground tongue. Overcoming these barriers, they immediately elected Kosaburo Baba (president), Y. Yamaguchi (secretary of the Japanese branch), and J.M. Lizarras (secretary of the Mexican branch); Baba and Lizarras were both labor contractors and Yamaguchi has been recognized as a boarding student recruited from San Francisco. Their immediate concerns opposed the WACC on three conditions:

- they accused the WACC of artificially suppressing wages;
- they opposed the subcontracting system arguing that it forced workers to pay double commissions; and
- they called for the freedom to buy goods rather than be subjected to the inflated prices of the company store.

In order to remedy these issues, the JMLA membership ceased working through the WACC (essentially declaring a strike). The strike came at a serendipitously precarious time in the sugar beet season, the staple crop of Oxnard Plain agriculture, since the labor-intensive and yield-defining work of thinning the seedlings needed to be done within the scope of a few weeks. By refusing to work through the WACC during the thinning of sugar beet crops, the JMLA challenged the backbone of financial operations in the Oxnard Plain. Laborers who participated in the strike threatened the profits of the owners of the WACC, the American Beet Sugar Company, and the farm owners. Their actions were met with hostile responses from local newspapers and the leadership of the American Beet Sugar Company. Colonel Driffil, manager of the American Beet Sugar Company, formally declared the company's support for the WACC and threatened to drive those who participated in the strike "out of the country". Outside of their own membership and other local Mexican and Japanese residents, the JMLA found little support from the white community in Oxnard outside of a few opportunistic merchants who saw the strike as a chance to disrupt WACC operations.

By the first week in March, the JMLA recruited a membership larger than 1,200 workers (over 90% of the labor force of the county's beet industry). The JMLA's increased recruitment pulled the WACC's former contracted workers from it and essentially brought the sugar industry to a standstill. Along with the labor strike, the JMLA staged large demonstrations and marches in Oxnard, displaying the union's strength in numbers. During the second and third weeks of March, the WACC formed an alternative union known as the Independent Agricultural Labor Union (IALU) which intended to undercut the JMLA's efforts. The IALU worked with the WACC as a strikebreaking organization seeking to restore regular working conditions in the sugar beet fields rather than advocate for farmworkers' rights.

On March 23, 1903, the strike reached its turning point. During a confrontation between the JMLA and IALU strikebreakers in Oxnard's Chinatown shots were fired, wounding two Japanese and two Mexican members of the JMLA. Luis Vasquez, a Mexican member of the JMLA, was killed by the gunfire. Initial reports by local newspapers blamed the JMLA for the violence; however, a statement released by the JMLA in the following days asserted that union members were not armed at the confrontation, pointing out that no union members had been arrested. The sole arrest from the confrontation was that of Deputy Constable Charles Arnold for the murder of Luis Vasquez. A subsequent coroner's inquest to determine Arnold's role in the murder saw the testimonies of 50 witnesses, many of which contradicted one another with certain witnesses claiming they had observed Arnold firing at Vasquez and others claiming that Arnold had not even raised his gun at the confrontation. After a series of conflicting witness accounts, the county coroner requested that more Japanese witnesses speak at the inquest in the following days. However, the all-white male jury refused to continue the inquest as they had reached a verdict with the given evidence. The jury found Charles Arnold innocent in the murder of Luis Vasquez and he was cleared of all charges.

Despite the outcome of the coroner's inquest, the WACC continued their striking efforts, bringing organized laborers from outside of town as well as intercepting potential strikebreakers. The Ventura Free Press reported on an incident in which members of the JMLA confronted a group of strikebreakers headed to a local farm and successfully convinced them to join the union's cause.

After the deadly skirmish in Chinatown, JMLA representatives met with representatives of local farmers and the WACC to engage in negotiations. During the first two days of negotiations, the JMLA stated clearly that they would refuse to end the strike until the WACC ended their monopoly over Oxnard Plain sugar beet operations and allow workers to contract directly with local farmers. The strike reached an official end on March 30, 1903 after the WACC agreed to cancel all standing contracts with local sugar beet farmers and grant farmworkers the right to contract directly with local growers.

=== Aftermath ===
Japanese and Mexican laborers, formerly pitted against each other, had unified to achieve their labor goals. With the WACC as their common enemy, Japanese and Mexican farmworkers recognized their primary struggle as an issue of class conflict. JMLA membership viewed Anglo, Mexican, and even Japanese contractors who worked in conjunction with the WACC as antagonists to their cause. The success JMLA achieved showed the effectiveness of a multi-racial labor front and showed that class and Asian and Mexican shared oppression could be the unifier in labor organizing.

The racial dimensions of the JMLA victory against the WACC brought several issues to the attention of the mainstream American labor movement which traditionally refused to integrate minorities and agricultural workers into unions. While certain socialist groups and local factions of organized labor supported the organization of Japanese and Mexican farmworkers, the majority of AFL affiliates and leadership did not support the JMLA. This position was mostly based in anti-Asian attitudes and the traditional exclusion of farm laborers from AFL activities.

Following their victory against the WACC, the JMLA sought to charter as the Sugar Beet Farm Laborer's Union of Oxnard (SBFLU) under the American Federation of Labor (AFL). However, the JMLA withdrew their request to charter under the AFL after AFL president Samuel Gompers refused to recognize the membership of Asian laborers under the AFL.

The demise of Japanese-Mexican sugar beet unionism is not solely explicable by the SBFLU's rejection of the AFL's racist charter proposal. Following dissolution of the WACC and its attempts to displace independent Japanese and Mexican labor contractors, contractors shifted from class cooperation to market competition. Moreover, the demise of WACC led to the disintegration of common cause between the laborers and contractors, the former having their own grievances against the latter as dishonest and exploitative in their own right.

=== Legacy ===
Thirty years after the first strike of betabeleros in Oxnard, a second, and unsuccessful, Oxnard strike of sugar beet workers would take place in 1933. Two keys to the success of the 1903 strike was the cross-class alliance between laborers and their contractors, and the cross-cultural alliance of Mexican and Japanese laborers. On the first point, solidarity between contractors and workers did not materialize because the growers' association cut the wage rate, but did not make the WACC's miscalculation of attempting to displace independent contractors. On the second point, the ethnic composition of field labor had radically changed: whereas the Japanese workers formed a majority in 1903, Mexican and Mexican-American laborers comprised roughly eighty percent of the 1,200 strikers in 1933, the other twenty percent being Filipino. The growers, in not aggrieving the contractors, did not push them into alliance with the laborers. Despite the second strike's failure, the success of the first strike in producing an interethnic unity between Latino and Asian workers can be viewed as prefiguring subsequent history: Cesar Chavez, who would do labor-organizing work in Oxnard, would eventually head up a union encompassing Mexican-American and Filipino-American workers.

== See also ==
- Oxnard, California
- La Colonia Barrio

== Bibliography ==
- Almaguer, Tomás. "Racial Domination and Class Conflict in Capitalist Agriculture: The Oxnard Sugar Beet Workers' Strike of 1903." Labor History, vol. 25, no. 3 (Summer 1984). Reprinted in Cornford, Daniel A. (ed.) (1995), Working People of California, Berkeley and Los Angeles, CA: University of California Press, pp. 183–207.
- Almaguer, Tomás. (1994) Racial Fault Lines: The Historical Origins of White Supremacy in California. University of California Press.
- Barajas, Frank P. (2012) Curious Unions: Mexican American Workers and Resistance in Oxnard, California, 1998-1961. Lincoln: University of Nebraska Press
