= Durandal-class destroyer =

French Navy ship class, built 1896–1900

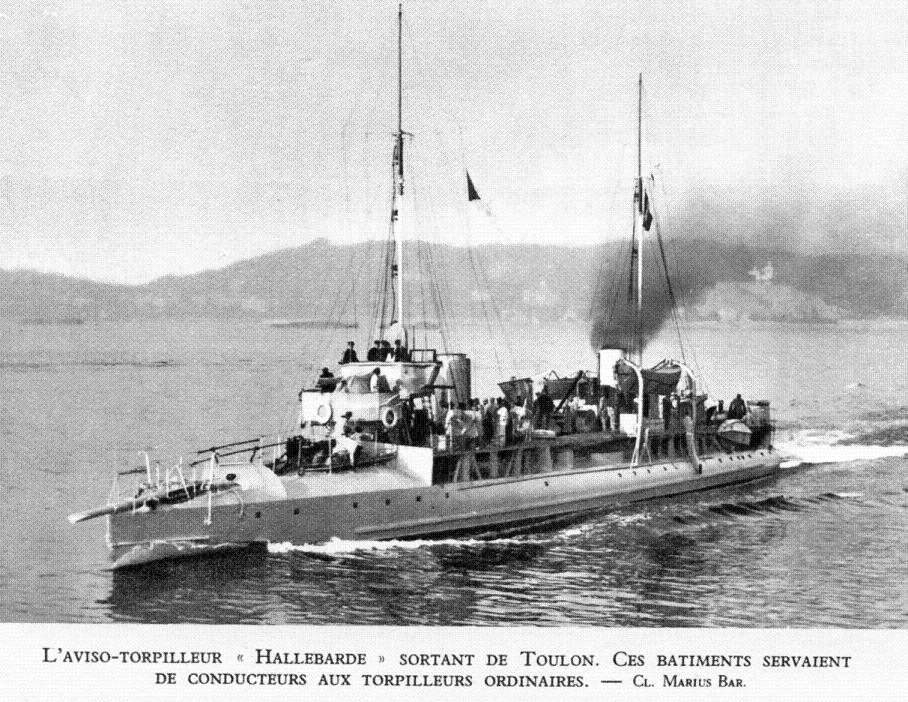
- Hallebarde departing Toulon

Class overview
- Name: Durandal class
- Builders: Chantiers et Ateliers Augustin Normand, Le Havre
- Operators: French Navy
- Preceded by: None
- Succeeded by: Framée class
- Built: 1899–1900
- In commission: 1899–1921
- Completed: 4
- Lost: 1
- Scrapped: 3

General characteristics
- Displacement: 301–311 t (296–306 long tons)
- Length: 57.5 m (188 ft 8 in) o/a
- Beam: 6.30 m (20 ft 8 in)
- Draft: 3.17 m (10 ft 5 in)
- Installed power: 2 water-tube boilers; 4,800 ihp (3,600 kW)
- Propulsion: 2 shafts; 2 triple-expansion steam engines
- Speed: 26 knots (48 km/h; 30 mph)
- Range: 2,300 nmi (4,300 km; 2,600 mi) at 10 knots (19 km/h; 12 mph)
- Complement: 52
- Armament: 1 × single 65 mm (2.6 in) gun; 6 × single 47 mm (1.9 in) guns; 2 × single 380 mm (15 in) torpedo tubes

The Durandal class was a group of four destroyers built for the French Navy between 1896 and 1900, used during the First World War. These vessels were France's first true destroyers rather than torpedo boats. Two units were launched in 1899 while another two followed in 1900. Another four destroyers of the similar Samsun class were laid down in 1906 and completed in 1907 for the Ottoman Navy, they also served in the First World War.

These vessels, which were an enlarged derivative of the previous Filibustier-class torpedo boats, resembled the Havock class of Great Britain. Its hull had a turtleback bow to reduce water resistance, with two masts and two funnels. The ships were powered by two triple expansion engines fed by water tube boilers, giving a speed of 26 knots (48 km/h; 30 mph), and were armed by two torpedo tubes (with two reload torpedoes carried on board), a 65 mm (2.6 in) and six 47 mm (1.9 in) guns.

The Durandal destroyers were laid down between 1896 and 1897 and completed between 1899 and 1900. Espingole struck a rock in the Bay of Cavalaire-sur-Mer off the South of France on 4 February 1903, which caused the ship to sink. The three remaining destroyers served through the First World War, operating in both the English Channel and the Mediterranean Sea. They were sold for scrap in 1921.

== Durandal class ==
All four were built by Normand at Le Havre. The first pair (Durandal and Hallebarde) were ordered on 5 and 25 August 1896 respectively. They had a turtledeck forecastle and a flying deck aft, with two masts and two funnels widely separated by their machinery. The second pair (Fauconneau and Espignole) were ordered on 14 April 1897, and differed from the first pair by having a strengthened hull and a slightly raised bow.

- Durandal – launched 11 February 1899, stricken 7 April 1919.
- Hallebarde – launched 8 June 1899, stricken 4 March 1920.
- Fauconneau – launched 2 April 1900, stricken 15 January 1921.
- Espingole – launched 28 June 1900, ran aground and lost 4 February 1903.

== Samsun class ==
Samsun class
Class overview
Name	Samsun class
Builders	Forges et Chantiers de la Gironde, Bordeaux Ateliers et Chantiers de la Loire, Nantes
Operators	Ottoman Navy
Built	1906–1907
In commission	1907–1932
Completed	4
Lost	1
Scrapped	3
General characteristics
Displacement	301–311 t (296–306 long tons)
Length	57.5 m (188 ft 8 in) o/a
Beam	6.30 m (20 ft 8 in)
Draft	3.17 m (10 ft 5 in)
Installed power	2 water-tube boilers; 5,950 ihp (4,440 kW)
Propulsion	2 shafts; 2 Triple-expansion steam engines
Speed	28 knots (52 km/h; 32 mph)
Range	975 nmi (1,806 km; 1,122 mi) at 15 knots (28 km/h; 17 mph)
Complement	52
Armament	1 × single 65 mm (2.6 in)/50 M1902 gun; 6 × single 47 mm (1.9 in)/50 M1902 guns; 2 × single 450 mm (18 in) torpedo tubes

The Samsun-class destroyers had similar dimensions to the Durandal class, but had more powerful machinery, more powerful armament, higher top speed and shorter range. Three of the four (Samsun, Yarhisar and Basra) were built by C A de la Gironde at Bordeaux, while Tasoz was built by Schneider at Nantes. These ships suffered from mechanical problems due to poor maintenance and played little part in World War I. It was estimated that none could exceed 17 knots (31 km/h; 20 mph) in 1915. The Yarhisar was sunk in 1915 and the three surviving ships were scrapped in 1949. Yarhisar was under the command of Lt. Cdr. Ahmet Hulusi and sank in the gulf of Izmit near Yalova on 3 December 1915 by the British submarine HMS E11 under the command of Lt. Cdr. Martin Dunbar-Nasmith. The torpedo struck the engine room and the ship was torn in two. Forty-two of her crew (36 Turks and 6 Germans) died.

- Samsun – laid up in 1918, repaired and recommissioned in 1924–1925, decommissioned in 1932, BU in 1949.
- Yarhisar – sunk 3 December 1915, by the British submarine HMS E11.
- Taşoz – laid up in 1918, repaired and recommissioned in 1924–1925, decommissioned in 1932, BU in 1949.
- Basra – laid up in 1918, repaired and recommissioned in 1924–1925, decommissioned in 1932, BU in 1949.

== Bibliography ==
- Campbell, N. J. M. (1979). "France". In Chesneau, Roger & Kolesnik, Eugene M. (eds.). Conway's All the World's Fighting Ships 1860–1905. Greenwich: Conway Maritime Press. pp. 283–333. ISBN 0-8317-0302-4.
- Caresse, Philippe (2013). "The Unlucky Destroyer Espignole". In Jordan, John (ed.). Warship 2013. London: Conway. ISBN 978-1-84486-205-4.
- Couhat, Jean Labayle (1974). French Warships of World War I. London: Ian Allan. ISBN 0-7110-0445-5.
- Osborne, Eric W. (2005). Destroyers – An Illustrated History of Their Impact. Santa Barbara, California: ABC-Clio. ISBN 1-85109-479-2.
- Jordan, John (2025). "The 300-Tonnes: The First French Torpedo Boat Destroyer". In Jordan, John (ed.). Warship 2025. London: Bloomsbury Publishing. pp. 111–132. ISBN 978-1-4728-6854-1.
- Prévoteaux, Gérard (2017). La marine française dans la Grande guerre: les combattants oubliés: Tome I 1914–1915 [The French Navy during the Great War: The Forgotten Combatants, Book I 1914–1915]. Collection Navires & Histoire des Marines du Mond. Vol. 23. Le Vigen, France: Éditions Lela presse. ISBN 978-2-37468-000-2.
- Prévoteaux, Gérard (2017). La marine française dans la Grande guerre: les combattants oubliés: Tome II 1916–1918 [The French Navy during the Great War: The Forgotten Combatants, Book II 1916–1918]. Collection Navires & Histoire des Marines du Mond. Vol. 27. Le Vigen, France: Éditions Lela presse. ISBN 978-2-37468-001-9.
- Roberts, Stephen S. (2021). French Warships in the Age of Steam 1859–1914: Design, Construction, Careers and Fates. Barnsley, UK: Seaforth Publishing. ISBN 978-1-5267-4533-0.
- Roche, Jean-Michel (2005). Dictionnaire des bâtiments de la flotte de guerre française de Colbert à nos jours [Dictionary of French Warships from Colbert to the Present Day]. Vol. II: 1870–2006. Group Retozel-Maury Millau. ISBN 978-2-9525917-0-6. OCLC 165892922.
