= French destroyer Hallebarde =

French Navy destroyer

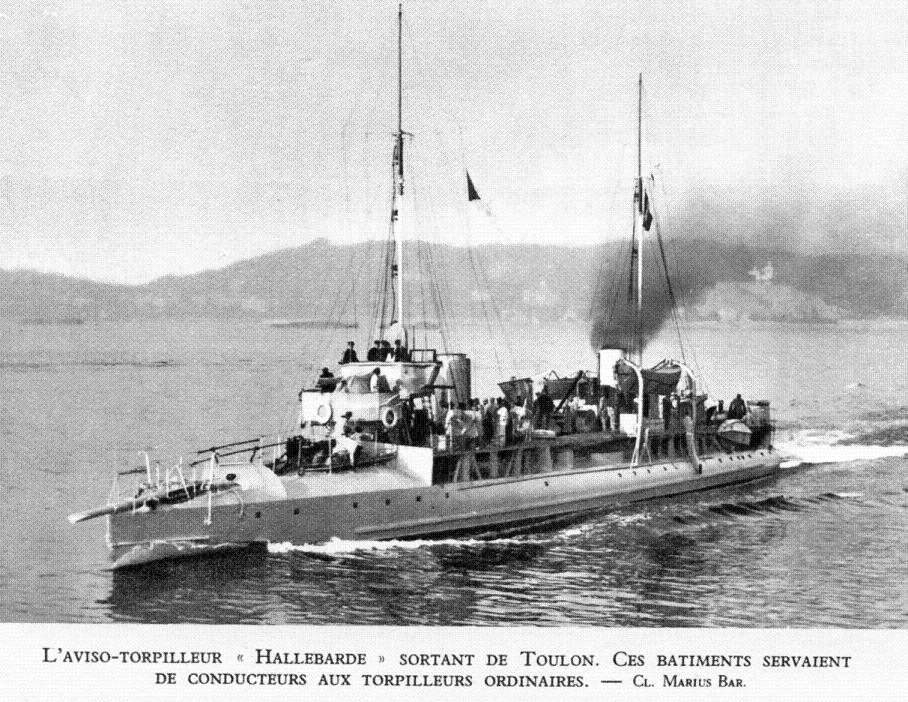
- Hallebarde departing Toulon

History

France
- Name: Hallebarde
- Namesake: Halberd
- Ordered: 25 August 1896
- Builder: Normand, Le Havre
- Launched: 8 June 1899
- Stricken: 4 March 1920
- Fate: Sold for scrap, 20 April 1921

General characteristics
- Class & type: Durandal-class destroyer
- Displacement: 311 t (306 long tons)
- Length: 57.64 m (189 ft 1 in)
- Beam: 6.3 m (20 ft 8 in)
- Draft: 3.2 m (10 ft 6 in)
- Depth: 4.1 m (13 ft 5 in)
- Installed power: 2 × Normand boilers; 5,200 PS (3,800 kW)
- Propulsion: 2 × Shafts; 2 × Triple-expansion steam engines
- Speed: 26 knots (48 km/h; 30 mph)
- Range: 2,300 nmi (4,300 km; 2,600 mi) at 10 knots (19 km/h; 12 mph)
- Complement: 64 officers and enlisted men
- Armament: 1 × 65 mm (2.6 in) gun; 6 × 47 mm (1.9 in) guns; 2 × 381 mm (15 in) torpedo tubes

Hallebarde was one of four Durandal-class destroyers built for the French Navy in the late 1890s.

== Design and description ==
The Durandals had an overall length of 57.64 meters (189 ft 1 in), a beam of 6.3 meters (20 ft 8 in), and a maximum draft of 3.2 meters (10 ft 6 in). They displaced 311 metric tons (306 long tons) at deep load. The two triple-expansion steam engines, each driving one propeller shaft, were designed to produce a total of 5,200 metric horsepower (3,825 kW), using steam provided by two Normand boilers. The ships had a designed speed of 26 knots (48 km/h; 30 mph), but Hallebarde reached 27.2 knots (50.4 km/h; 31.3 mph) during her sea trials. The ships carried enough coal to give them a range of 2,300 nautical miles (4,300 km; 2,600 mi) at 10 knots (19 km/h; 12 mph). Their original complement consisted of four officers and forty-eight enlisted men, but the number of enlisted men increased to sixty in 1899.

The Durandal-class ships were armed with a single 65-millimeter (2.6 in) gun forward of the bridge and six 47-millimeter (1.9 in) Hotchkiss guns, three on each broadside. They were fitted with two single 381-millimeter (15 in) torpedo tubes, one between the funnels and the other on the stern. Two reload torpedoes were also carried; their air flasks, however, had to be charged before they could be used, a process that took several hours. The Modèle 1887 torpedo that they used had a warhead weight of 42 kilograms (93 lb).

== Construction and career ==
Hallebarde (Halberd) was ordered from Chantiers et Ateliers Augustin Normand on 5 August 1896 and the ship was laid down at its shipyard in Le Havre on 25 August. The ship was launched on 8 June 1899 and conducted her sea trials in July–August. She was commissioned on 12 September.

When the First World War began in August 1914, Hallebarde was a leader (divisionnaire) in the 1st Submarine and Destroyer Flotilla (1^{ère} escadrille sous-marins et torpilleurs) of the 1st Naval Army (1^{ère} Armée navale), based in Toulon.

== Bibliography ==
- Campbell, N. J. M. (1979). "France". In Chesneau, Roger & Kolesnik, Eugene M. (eds.). Conway's All the World's Fighting Ships 1860–1905. Greenwich: Conway Maritime Press. pp. 283–333. ISBN 0-8317-0302-4.
- Caresse, Philippe (2013). "The Unlucky Destroyer Espignole". In Jordan, John (ed.). Warship 2013. London: Conway. ISBN 978-1-84486-205-4.
- Couhat, Jean Labayle (1974). French Warships of World War I. London: Ian Allan. ISBN 0-7110-0445-5.
- Prévoteaux, Gérard (2017). La marine française dans la Grande guerre: les combattants oubliés: Tome I 1914–1915 [The French Navy during the Great War: The Forgotten Combatants, Book I 1914–1915]. Collection Navires & Histoire des Marines du Mond. Vol. 23. Le Vigen, France: Éditions Lela presse. ISBN 978-2-37468-000-2.
- Prévoteaux, Gérard (2017). La marine française dans la Grande guerre: les combattants oubliés: Tome II 1916–1918 [The French Navy during the Great War: The Forgotten Combatants, Book II 1916–1918]. Collection Navires & Histoire des Marines du Mond. Vol. 27. Le Vigen, France: Éditions Lela presse. ISBN 978-2-37468-001-9.
- Roberts, Stephen S. (2021). French Warships in the Age of Steam 1859–1914: Design, Construction, Careers and Fates. Barnsley, UK: Seaforth Publishing. ISBN 978-1-5267-4533-0.
