= Japanese-Mexican Labor Association =

The Japanese-Mexican Labor Association (JMLA) was a labor union created in February 1903 by Japanese and Mexican sugar beet thinners in Oxnard, California. The JMLA was created to combat the wage cuts that the Western Agricultural Contracting Company (WACC) was trying to impose on the sugar beet laborers.

== History ==
=== Founding ===
The JMLA was established in 1903 by Japanese and Mexican sugar beet workers in Oxnard, California. They were founded to try to unionize against the American Beet Sugar Company (ABSC) and the WACC. The ABSC funded the creation of the WACC to contract sugar beet farmers and monopolize the market so they could cut the wages of sugar beet workers. The WACC reduced wages for beet thinning from $5 an acre to as low as $3.75 an acre. The WACC also stopped paying the laborers in cash instead paying them in store credit that could only be used at a select few stores. The combination of these events led to a group of 700 laborers, 500 of which were Japanese and the other 200 were Mexican, coming together to form the Japanese-Mexican Labor Association, though the JMLA would quickly grow to 1,200 members. They elected Kosaburo Baba as their president, Y. Yamaguchi as the secretary of the Japanese branch and J.M. Lizarras as the secretary of the Mexican branch. Any meetings the JMLA had needed to be held in both Japanese and Spanish to overcome the language barrier between the two groups and despite the language barrier the two groups worked together as one.

=== 1903 Oxnard strike ===
The JMLA's biggest achievement was the 1903 Oxnard strike. The strike started in March 1903 and 1,200 sugar beet workers representing 90% of the sugar beet labor force was participating in the strike. These strikes led to an almost complete stop in the farming of sugar beets and the WACC sent armed strikebreakers to try to end the strikes in Oxnard. Tensions rose until March 23 when the strikebreakers shot 5 unarmed JMLA members wounding two Japanese, two Mexican members and killing Luis Vasquez. A funeral service was held for Luis, and more than 1,000 JMLA members came to show their support. Deputy Charles Arnold was arrested for the murder of Luis Vasquez and despite the witness testimony, Arnold was ultimately cleared of the charges. The news coverage of this event was biased against the JMLA, many newspapers framed the unarmed strikers as rioters. This led to the JMLA releasing an official statement about the events that took place March 23. Despite the strikebreakers efforts the WACC eventually gave into the demand of the JMLA and raised wages back to $5.00 per acre of sugar beets thinned. The WACC also stopped importing laborers to replace the Japanese beet thinners and the JMLA had successfully executed one of the first cross-cultural strikes.

=== End of the JMLA ===
The success of the strike led to the JMLA becoming the Sugar Beet Farm Laborers Union (SBFLU). The new SBFLU requested a charter from the American Federation of Labor (AFL) to increase benefits given to all members. The SBFLU's request were granted, however, due to AFL president Samuel Gompers' anti-Asian sentiment he would only provide this grant if the SBFLU removed all Asian members. The SBFLU was outraged that Gompers refused to accept them into the AFL due to their Asian member and secretary J.M Lizzaras sent an official reply on June 8, 1903 denouncing Gompers' action and refusing to accept the grant if it was not extended to all members. Despite their earlier success the SBFLU could not provide enough benefits to their members without proper funding and this led to eventual end of the SBFLU.

Moreover, the SBFLU's leverage came from labor shortages which created a tight market in sugar beet cultivation, shortages which disappeared as growers raised wages. Moreover, the alliance at the heart of the union—between labor contractors and the betabeleros—dissolved with the dissolution of the WACC: cooperation between labor contractors in the heyday of the 1903 strike dissolved into hostile inter-contractor competition, and animosity of betabeleros against contractors who they perceived as exploitative and dishonest (the latter not uncommonly running away with wages due to work crews).
