= Education in China =

Ministry of Education
- Minister of Education: Huai Jinpeng

National education budget (2023)
- Budget: CN¥6.46 trillion (2023)

General details
- Primary languages: Mandarin
- System type: National (in most parts)

Literacy (2015)
- Total: 96.7%
- Male: 98.2%
- Female: 94.5%

Enrollment (2020)
- Total: 250.5 million
- Primary: 107.5 million
- Secondary: 90.8 million^{1}
- Post secondary: 52.2 million

Attainment (2020 census)
- Secondary diploma: 81%^{2}
- Post-secondary diploma: 19%^{3}
- ^{1} Including junior and senior secondary students;^{2} Among 25-64 year-olds, including junior and senior secondary attainments;^{3} Among 25-64 year-olds, including associate, bachelor and graduate degrees.

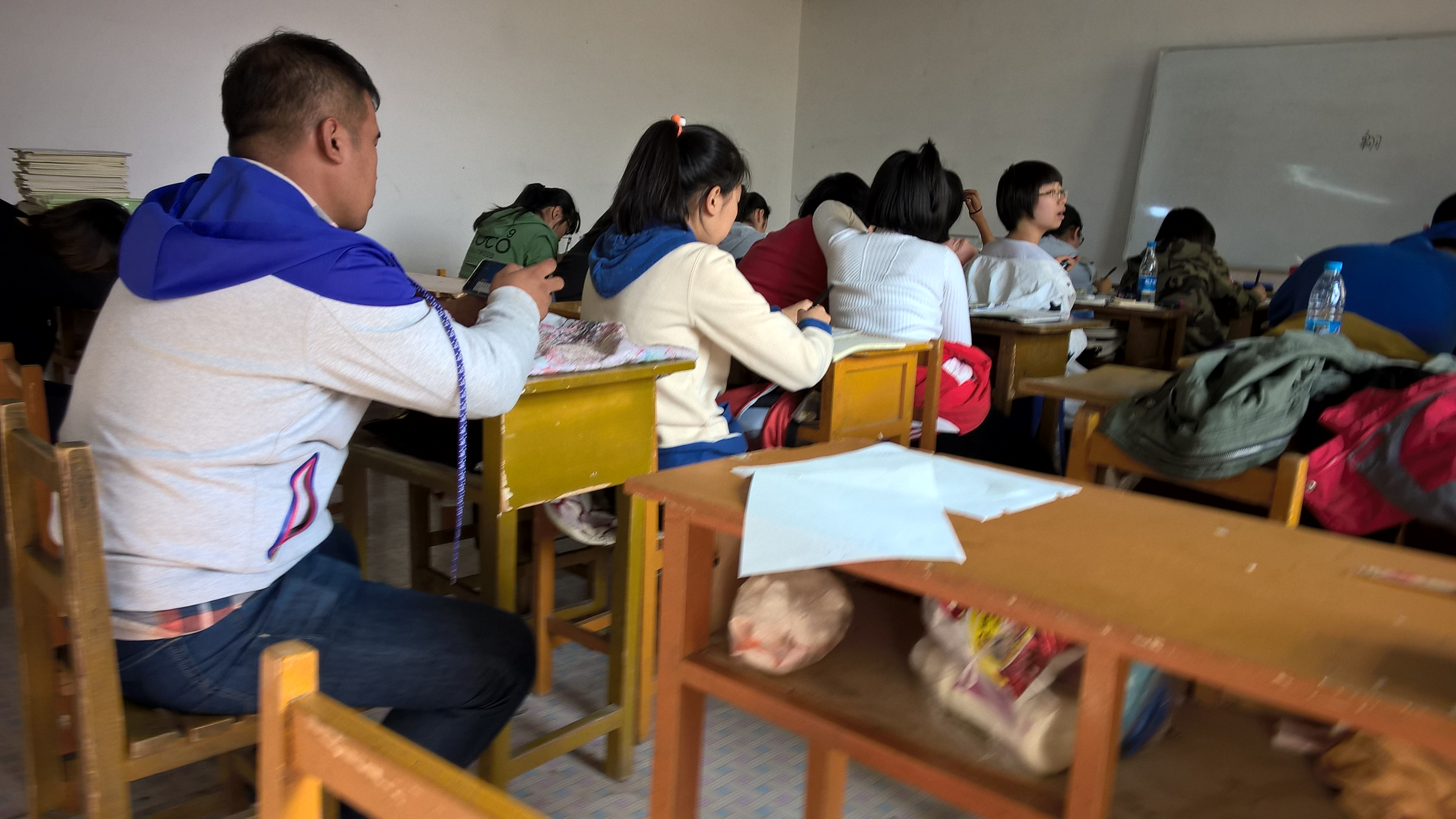
Students in Tieling

Education in the People's Republic of China is primarily managed by the state-run public education system, which falls under the Ministry of Education. By law, education in the People's Republic of China is led by the Chinese Communist Party (CCP) and adheres to its ideology. All citizens must attend school for a minimum of nine years, known as nine-year compulsory education, which is funded by the government through the national education budget.

Compulsory education includes six years of elementary school, typically starting at the age of six and finishing at the age of twelve, followed by three years of middle school. A middle school graduate may choose to continue their secondary education for three more years in a high school or a vocational school.

In 2020, the Ministry of Education reported an increase of new entrants of 34.4 million students entering compulsory education, bringing the total number of students who attend compulsory education to 156 million.

In 1985, the government abolished tax-funded higher education, requiring university applicants to compete for scholarships based on their academic capabilities. In the early 1980s, the government allowed the establishment of the first private institution of higher learning, thus increasing the number of undergraduates and people who hold doctoral degrees from 1995 to 2005.

Chinese investment in research and development has grown by 20 percent per year since 1999, exceeding $100 billion in 2011. As many as 1.5 million science and engineering students graduated from Chinese universities in 2006. By 2008, China had published 184,080 papers in recognized international journals – a seven-fold increase from 1996. In 2017, China surpassed the U.S. with the highest number of scientific publications. In 2021, there were 3,012 universities and colleges (see List of universities in China) in China, and 147 National Key Universities, which are considered to be part of an elite group Double First Class universities, accounted for approximately 4.6% of all higher education institutions in China.

China has also been a top destination for international students and as of 2013, China was the most popular country in Asia for international students and ranked third overall among countries. China is now the leading destination globally for Anglophone African students and is host of the second largest international students population in the world. As of 2025, there were 2 Chinese universities in the global top 20, 5 in the top 50, and 19 in the top 200, behind only the United States and the United Kingdom in terms of the overall representation in the Aggregate Ranking of Top Universities, a composite ranking system combining three of the world's most influential university rankings (ARWU+QS+ THE).

Chinese students in the country's most developed regions are among the best performing in the world in the Programme for International Student Assessment (PISA). Shanghai, Beijing, Jiangsu and Zhejiang outperformed all other education systems in the PISA. According to estimates from The Economist in 2026, China would have scored among the highest even if every single province had taken part in the test. For example, the country's math score would have been 536, the fourth highest in the world, while its average score across all three subjects would have been 501, the seventh highest in the world. China's educational system has been noted for its emphasis on rote memorization and test preparation. However, PISA spokesman Andreas Schleicher says that China has moved away from learning by rote in recent years. According to Schleicher, Russia performs well in rote-based assessments, but not in PISA, whereas China does well in both rote-based and broader assessments.

== History ==
Improving population-wide literacy was the focus of education in the early years of the People's Republic of China. In 1949, the literacy rate was between 20 and 40 percent. The communist government focused on improving literacy through both formal schooling and literacy campaigns. In the first sixteen years of communist governance, elementary school enrollment tripled, secondary school enrollment increased by a factor of 8.5, and college enrollment more than quadrupled.

Since the end of the Cultural Revolution (1966–1976), the education system in China has been geared towards economic modernization. In 1985, the central government ceded responsibility for basic education to local governments through the Central Committee of the Chinese Communist Party's "Decision on the Reform of the Educational Structure". With the education reform plan in May 1985, the authorities called for nine years of compulsory education and the establishment of the State Education Commission (created the following month). Official commitment to improved education was nowhere more evident than in the substantial increase in funds for education in the Seventh Five-Year Plan (1986–1990), which amounted to 72 percent more than funds allotted to education in the previous plan period (1981–1985). In 1986, 23.9 percent of the state budget was earmarked for education, compared to 10.4 percent in 1984.

As a result of continual intra-party realignments, official policy has alternated between ideological imperatives and practical efforts to further national education. The Great Leap Forward (1958–1960) and the Socialist Education Movement (1962–1965) sought to end deeply rooted academic elitism, to narrow social and cultural gaps between workers and peasants and between urban and rural populations, and to eliminate the tendency of scholars and intellectuals to disdain manual labor. During the Cultural Revolution, universal fostering of social equality was an overriding priority.

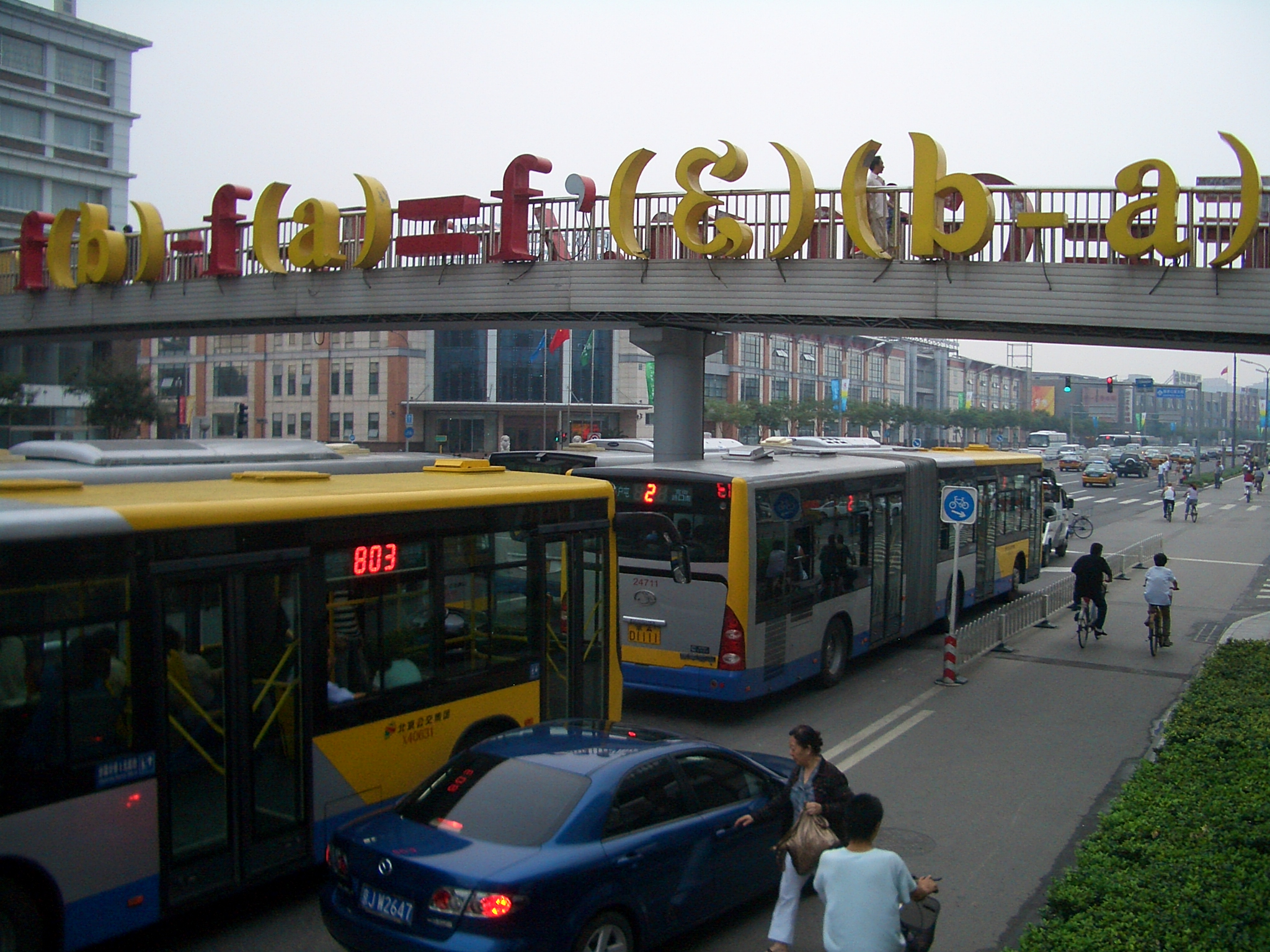
A mean value theorem equation is displayed on a bridge in Beijing

The post-Mao Zedong Chinese Communist Party leadership views education as the foundation of the Four Modernizations. In the early 1980s, science and technology education became an important focus of education policy. By 1986, training skilled personnel and expanding scientific and technical knowledge had been assigned the highest priority. Although the humanities were considered important, vocational and technical skills were considered paramount for meeting China's modernization goals.

The reorientation of educational priorities paralleled Deng Xiaoping's strategy for economic development. Emphasis also was placed on the further training of the already-educated elite, who would carry on the modernization program in the coming decades. A renewed emphasis on modern science and technology led to the adoption of an outward-looking policy that encouraged learning and borrowing from abroad for advanced training in a wide range of scientific fields, beginning in 1976.

Beginning at the Third Plenum of the Eleventh National Party Congress Central Committee in December 1978, intellectuals were encouraged to pursue research in support of the Four Modernizations and, as long as they complied with the party's "Four Cardinal Principles" they were given relatively free rein. When the party and the government determined that the structures of the four cardinal principles had been stretched beyond tolerable limits, they might restrict intellectual expression.

Literature and the arts also experienced a great revival in the late 1970s and 1980s. Traditional forms flourished once again, and many new kinds of literature and cultural expression were introduced from abroad.

In 2003, China's Ministry of Education called for adding environmental education content throughout the public school curriculum from the first year of primary school through the second year of high school.

== Development ==
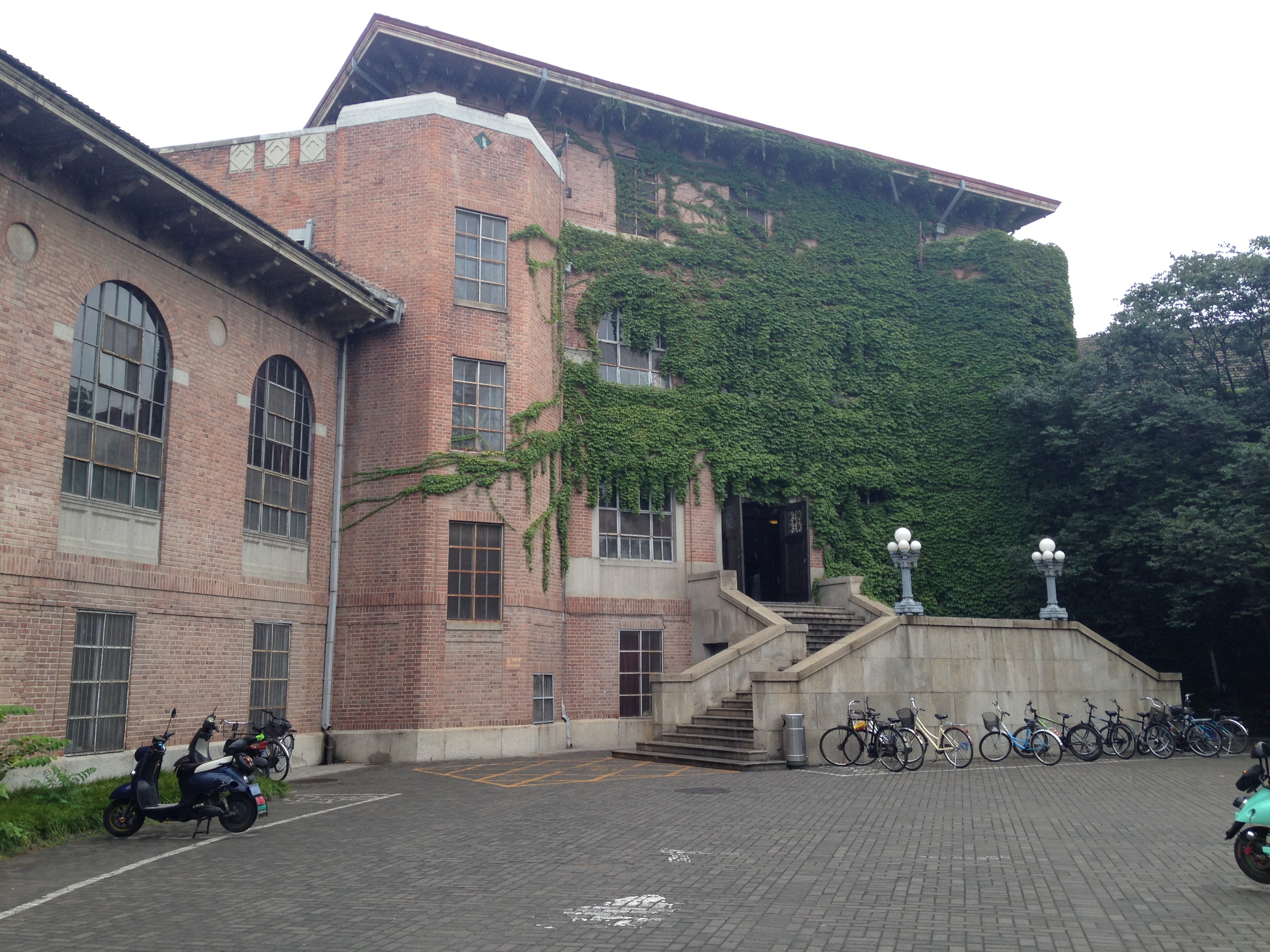
The old library at Tsinghua University ranked one of the top universities in China and worldwide

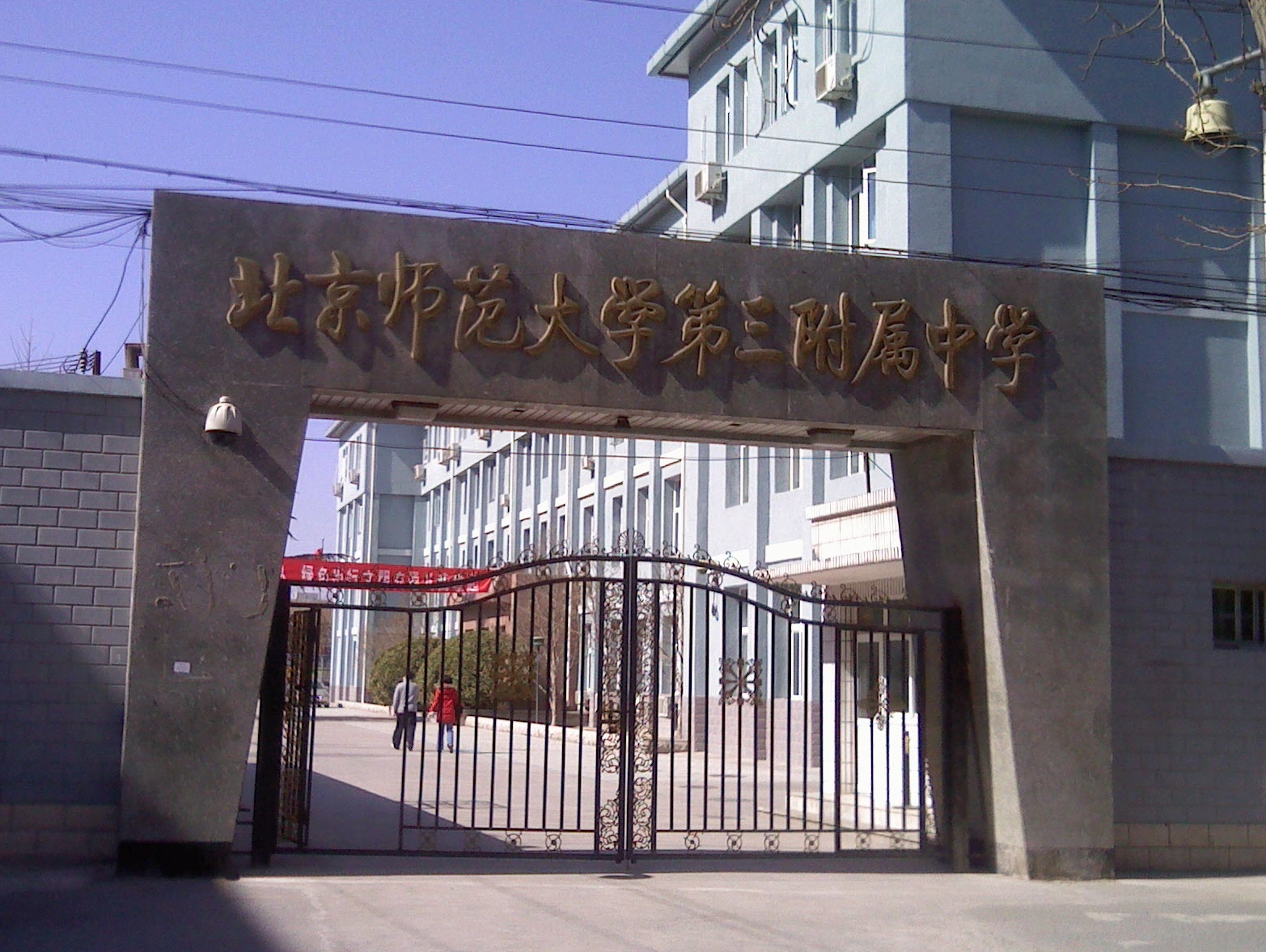
Entrance gate at the No. 3 Middle School Attached to Beijing Normal University, an example of an affiliation of primary, secondary, and tertiary institutions common in China

Since the 1950s, China has been providing a nine-year compulsory education to what amounts to a fifth of the world's population. By 1999, primary school education had become generalized in 90% of China, and mandatory nine-year compulsory education now effectively covered 85% of the population, but some rural areas in China still can not reach the goal of the nine-year compulsory education, because of the lack of teachers and hard to access. The education funding provided by the central and provincial governments varies across regions, and those in the rural areas are notably lower than those in major urban areas. Families supplement money provided to the school by the government with tuition fees.

For non-compulsory education, China adopts a shared-cost mechanism, charging tuition at a certain percentage of the cost. Meanwhile, to ensure that students from low-income families have access to higher education, the government has initiated ways of assistance, with policies and measures for scholarships, work-study programs and subsidies for students with special economic difficulties, tuition reduction or exemption and state stipends.

Illiteracy in the young and mid-aged population has fallen from over 80 percent down to five percent. The system trained some 60 million mid-or high-level professionals and almost 400 million laborers to the junior or senior high school level. Today, 250 million Chinese get three levels of school education (elementary, junior, and senior high school), doubling the rate of increase in the rest of the world during the same period. Net elementary school enrollment has reached 98.9 percent, and the gross enrollment rate in junior high schools 94.1 percent. As of 2015, the government-operated primary and lower secondary (junior high) schools in China have 28.8 million students.

Chinese high school students won multiple gold medals every year consistently at many International Science Olympiad Competitions like the International Biology Olympiad, the International Olympiad on Astronomy and Astrophysics, the International Olympiad in Informatics, the International Earth Science Olympiad, the International Mathematical Olympiad, the International Physics Olympiad and the International Chemistry Olympiad. As of 2022, China ranks first in the all-time medal count at the International Mathematical Olympiad with highest goal medals since its first participation in 1985. China also ranks first in the all-time medal count at the International Physics Olympiad, the International Chemistry Olympiad, and the International Olympiad in Informatics.

In a 2009 survey from the Programme for International Student Assessment (PISA), a worldwide evaluation of 15-year-old school pupils' scholastic performance by the OECD, Chinese students from Shanghai achieved the best results in mathematics, science and reading. The OECD also found that even in some of the very poor rural areas the performance is close to the OECD average. While averages across the breadth of other countries are reported, China's rankings are taken from only a few select districts. The PISA 2018 results showed that students of Beijing, Shanghai, Jiangsu and Zhejiang topped the rankings in reading, mathematics and science and China's school children are now the smartest in the world based on academic performance. OECD secretary-general Angel Gurria said the students from the four Chinese provinces had "outperformed by a large margin their peers from all of the other 78 participating countries" and the 10% most socio-economically disadvantaged students in these four areas "also showed better reading skills than those of the average student in OECD countries, as well as skills similar to the 10% most advantaged students in some of OECD countries". He cautioned that these four provinces and municipalities "are far from representing China as a whole." Yet their combined populations amount to over 180 million people, and the size of each region is equivalent to a typical OECD country even if their income is well below the OECD average. "What makes their achievement even more remarkable is that the level of income of these four Chinese regions is well below the OECD average". According to estimates from The Economist in 2026, China would have scored among the highest even if every single province had taken part in the test. For example, the country's math score would have been 536, the fourth highest in the world, while its average score across all three subjects would have been 501, the seventh highest in the world.

In the 1980s, the MBA was virtually unknown but by 2004 there were 47,000 MBAs, trained at 62 MBA schools. Many people also apply for international professional qualifications, such as EMBA and MPA; close to 10,000 MPA students are enrolled in 47 schools of higher learning, including Peking University and Tsinghua University. The education market has rocketed, with training and testing for professional qualifications, such as computer and foreign languages, thriving. Continuing education is the trend, once in one's life schooling has become lifelong learning.

Investment in education has increased in recent years; the proportion of the overall budget allocated to education has been increased by one percentage point every year since 1998. According to a Ministry of Education program, the government will set up an educational finance system in line with the public finance system, strengthen the responsibility of governments at all levels in educational investment, and ensure that their financial allocation for educational expenditure grows faster than their regular revenue. The program also laid out the government's aim that educational investment should account for four percent of GDP in a relatively short period of time.

== Education policy ==
According to the Education Law of the People's Republic of China, education in China is led by the Chinese Communist Party (CCP) and adheres to CCP ideology.

China's Five-Year Plans are an important means of coordinating education policy.

Deng Xiaoping's far-ranging educational reform policy, which involved all levels of the education system, aimed to narrow the gap between China and other developing countries. Thus, modernizing education was critical to modernizing China, which included; devolution of educational management from the central to the local level as the means chosen to improve the education system. Centralized authority was not abandoned, however, as evidenced by the creation of the State Education Commission.

Academically, the goals of reform were to enhance and universalize elementary and junior middle school education; to increase the number of schools and qualified teachers, and to develop vocational and technical education. A uniform standard for curricula, textbooks, examinations, and teacher qualifications (especially at the middle-school level) was established, and considerable autonomy and variations in and among the autonomous regions, provinces, and special municipalities were allowed. Further, the system of enrollment and job assignment in higher education was changed, with government control over colleges and universities was reduced.

Intergenerational transmission of socialist ideas is an explicit commitment of China's educational system. In 1991, the Chinese Communist Party launched the nationwide Patriotic Education Campaign. The major focus of the campaign was within education, and text books were revised to reduce narratives of class struggle and to emphasize the party's role in ending the century of humiliation.As part of the campaign, Patriotic Education Bases were established, and schools ranging from primary to the college levels were required to take students to sites of significance to the Chinese Communist Revolution.

At a national education conference held in Beijing on 10 September 2018, CCP general secretary Xi Jinping emphasized the importance of teaching Chinese socialism to the country's youth, in order to foster support for the CCP and its policies.

Xi has implemented a number of education reforms. Schools are required to adjust their opening hours to be consistent with work hours in their area so that parents can pick-up their children directly after work (in order to reduce reliance on private classes for adult supervision after school hours). Schools must also promote health by requiring outdoor physical education classes daily and providing eye examinations twice per term. Educational reforms have also limited the amount of homework students can be assigned. In Uyghur communities, Islamic education for children has been prohibited and teaching the Quran to children has resulted in criminal prosecution.

As part of CCP general secretary Xi Jinping's 2021 directive on Double Reduction Policy (reducing excessive off-campus tutoring and reducing homework burdens), schools may not assign homework to children to years one and two, homework is limited to no more than 60 minutes for children in years three to six, and no more than 90 minutes for middle school children. In July 2021, China enacted a series of rules designed to shutdown the private tutoring.

Since September 2021, private schools providing compulsory education can no longer be controlled by foreign entities or individuals. Only Chinese nationals may serve on their Boards of Directors.

In general, China's minority regions have some of the highest per capita government spending on education, among other public goods and services. Providing public goods and services in these areas part of a government effort to reduce regional inequalities, reduce the risk of separatism, and stimulate economic development. As of at least 2019, Tibet is the region of China with the largest per capita government spending on education.

Education consistently ranks as the highest category of local government expenditures.

On April 15, 2026, China rolled out a new series of national security textbooks for elementary to high school students, titled National Security Education Readers for Primary and Secondary Students, under the direction of the National Textbook Department. The materials emphasize loyalty to the Chinese Communist Party, framing national security in political terms and integrating party ideology into education from an early age. Critics have noted that the curriculum prioritizes regime stability over independent thinking, reflecting broader efforts by the CCP to strengthen ideological control within the school system.

In September 2026, the Management Measures for Leaders of Institutions of Higher Learning and the Management Measures for Leaders of Primary and Secondary Schools were revised, strengthening requirements for political qualifications and the leadership of the CCP, as well as putting greater emphasis on professional qualifications.

== Education system ==
Year	Ages	Stage
1st year	6–7	Elementary
2nd year	7–8	Elementary
3rd year	8–9	Elementary
4th year	9–10	Elementary
5th year	10–11	Elementary
6th year	11–12	Elementary
Chu-1 (7th year)	12–13	Middle school
Chu-2 (8th year)	13–14	Middle school
Chu-3 (9th year)	14–15	Middle school
Gao-1 (10th year)	15–16	High school
Gao-2 (11th year)	16–17	High school
Gao-3 (12th year)	17–18	High school

=== Compulsory education law ===
The Law on Nine-Year Compulsory Education (中华人民共和国义务教育法), which took effect on 1 July 1986, established requirements and deadlines for attaining universal education tailored to local conditions and guaranteed school-age children the right to receive at least nine years of education (six-year primary education and three years secondary education). People's congresses at various local levels were, within certain guidelines and according to local conditions, to decide the steps, methods, and deadlines for implementing nine-year compulsory education in accordance with the guidelines formulated by the central authorities. The program sought to bring rural areas, which had four to six years of compulsory schooling, into line with their urban counterparts. Education departments were exhorted to train millions of skilled workers for all trades and professions and to offer guidelines, curricula, and methods to comply with the reform program and modernization needs.

Provincial-level authorities were to develop plans, enact decrees and rules, distribute funds to counties, and administer directly a few key secondary schools. County authorities were to distribute funds to each township government, which was to make up for any deficiencies. County authorities were to supervise education and teaching and to manage their own senior high schools, teachers' schools, teachers' in-service training schools, agricultural vocational schools, and exemplary primary and junior high schools. The remaining schools were to be managed separately by the county and township authorities.

The compulsory education law divided China into three categories: cities and economically developed areas in coastal provinces and a small number of developed areas in the hinterland; towns and villages with medium development; and economically backward areas.

By November 1985, the first category – the larger cities and approximately 20 percent of the counties (mainly in the more developed coastal and southeastern areas of China) – had achieved universal 9-year education. By 1990, cities, economically developed areas in coastal provincial-level units, a small number of developed interior areas (approximately 25 percent of China's population), and areas where junior high schools were already popularized were targeted to have universal junior-high-school education.

Education planners envisioned that by the mid-1990s, all workers and staff in coastal areas, inland cities, and moderately developed areas (with a combined population of 300 million to 400 million people) would have either compulsory 9-year or vocational education and that 5 percent of the people in these areas would have a college education, building a solid intellectual foundation for China. Furthermore, the planners expected that secondary education and university entrants would have increased by the year 2000.

The second category targeted under the 9-year compulsory education law consisted of towns and villages with medium-level development (around 50 percent of China's population), where universal education was expected to reach the junior-high-school level by 1995. Technical and higher education was projected to develop at the same rate.

The third category, economically backward (rural) areas (around 25 percent of China's population), were to popularize basic education without a timetable and at various levels according to local economic development, though the state would try to support educational development. The state also would assist education in minority nationality areas. In the past, rural areas, which lacked a standardized and universal primary education system, had produced generations of illiterates; only 60 percent of their primary school graduates had met established standards.

As a further example of the government's commitment to nine-year compulsory education, in January 1986 the State Council drafted a bill passed at the Fourteenth Session of the Standing Committee of the Sixth National People's Congress that made it illegal for any organization or individual to employ youths before they had completed their nine years of schooling. The bill also authorized free education and subsidies for students whose families had financial difficulties.

Tuition-free primary education is, despite compulsory education laws, still a target rather than a realized goal throughout China. As many families have difficulty paying school fees, some children are forced to leave school earlier than the nine-year goal.

The 9-year System is called "Nine Years – One Policy", or "九年一贯制" in Chinese. It usually refers to the educational integration of the elementary school and the middle school. After graduating from elementary school, graduates can directly enter into the junior high school. The years in schools that implement the 9-year System are usually called Year 1, Year 2, and so on through Year 9.

Main features of the 9-year System:

1. Continuity. Students finish education from the elementary school to the middle school.
2. The principle of proximity. Students enter into the nearby school instead of middle school entrance examination.
3. Unity. Schools that carry out the 9-year System practice unified management in school administration, teaching and education.

In 2001, the Chinese government initiated the "Two exemptions and one subsidy plan". Students from poor families receiving compulsory education in rural areas are exempted from miscellaneous fees and book fees, and boarding students are gradually subsidized for living expenses. In 2007, all rural students receiving compulsory education from poor families enjoyed the policy of two exemptions and one subsidy, totaling about 50 million students. Starting in 2017, two exemptions and one subsidy under the urban-rural unified system will be implemented.

=== Basic education ===
China's basic education involves pre-school (around 3 years), nine-year compulsory education from elementary to junior high school, standard senior high school education, special education for disabled children, and education for illiterate people.

China has over 200 million elementary and high school students, who, together with pre-school children, account for one sixth of the total population. For this reason, the Central Government has prioritized basic education as a key field of infrastructure construction and educational development.

In recent years, senior high school education has developed steadily. In 2004 enrollment was 8.215 million, 2.3 times that of 1988. Gross national enrollment in senior high schools has reached 43.8 percent, still lower than that of other developed countries.

The government has created a special fund to improve conditions in China's elementary and high schools, for new construction, expansion, and the re-building of run-down structures. Per-capita educational expenditure for elementary and high school students has grown greatly, teaching and research equipment, books, and documents being updated and renewed every year.

The government's aim for the development of China's basic education system is to approach or attain the level of moderately developed countries by 2010.

Graduates of China's primary and secondary schools test highly in both basic skills and critical thinking skills; however, due to poor health, rural students often drop out or lack in achievement.

=== Key schools ===
"Key schools" is a term for institutions with a record of academic achievements which were given priority in the assignment of teachers, equipment, and funds. Many of these key schools were shut down during the Cultural Revolution, reappeared in the late 1970s and, in the early 1980s, and became an integral part of the effort to revive the lapsed education system. Because educational resources were scarce, key schools also were allowed to recruit the best students for special training to compete for admission to top schools at the next level. Key schools constituted only a small percentage of all regular senior high schools and funneled the best students into the best secondary schools, largely on the basis of entrance scores. In 1980 the greatest resources were allocated to the key schools that would produce the greatest number of college entrants.

In early 1987, efforts had begun to develop the key school from a preparatory school into a vehicle for diffusing improved curricula, materials, and teaching practices in local schools. Moreover, the appropriateness of a key school's role in the nine-year basic education plan was questioned by some officials because key schools favored urban areas and the children of more affluent and better educated parents. Changchun, Shenyang, Shenzhen, Xiamen, and other cities, and education departments in Shanghai and Tianjin were moving to establish a student recommendation system and eliminate key schools. In 1986 the Shanghai Educational Bureau abolished the key junior-high-school system to ensure "an overall level of education". Despite the effort to abolish the "Key Schools" system, the practice still exists today under other names, and education inequality is still being widely criticized by some government officials and scholars.

=== Training schools ===
Training schools, also called training centers, are a type of private education offered by companies that teach students in China who are typically from 3–12 years old. These schools exist to improve student performance in academic subjects such as English, math, and Chinese. Training schools can range from a one-room operation with only one teacher to very large corporations with hundreds of thousands of students.

== Primary education ==
=== Primary schools ===
The institution of primary education in a country as vast as China has been an impressive accomplishment. In contrast to the 20 percent enrollment rate before 1949, in 1985 about 96 percent of primary school age children were enrolled in approximately 832,300 primary schools. This enrollment figure compared favorably with the recorded figures of the late 1960s and early 1970s when enrollment standards were more egalitarian. In 1985, the World Bank estimated that enrollments in primary schools would decrease from 136 million in 1983 to 95 million in the late 1990s and that the decreased enrollment would reduce the number of teachers needed. Yet qualified teachers would continue to be in demand.

Under the Law on Nine-Year Compulsory Education, primary schools were to be tuition-free and reasonably located for the convenience of children attending them; students would attend primary schools in their neighborhoods or villages. Parents paid a small fee per term for books and other expenses such as transportation, food and heating. Previously, fees were not considered a deterrent to attendance. Under the education reform, students from poor families received stipends, and state enterprises, institutions, and other sectors of society were encouraged to establish their own schools. A major concern was that scarce resources be conserved without causing enrollment to fall and without the weakening of the better schools. In particular, local governments were told not to pursue middle-school education blindly while primary school education was still developing, or to wrest money, teaching staff, and materials from primary schools.

Children usually entered primary school at seven years of age for six days a week, which after regulatory changes in 1995 and 1997 were changed to five and a half and five days, respectively. The two-semester school year consisted of 9.5 months, and began on 1 September and 1 March, with a summer vacation in July and August and a winter vacation in January and February. Urban primary schools typically divided the school week into twenty-four to twenty-seven classes of forty-five minutes each, but in the rural areas, the norm was half-day schooling, more flexible schedules, and itinerant teachers. Most primary schools had a five-year course, except in such cities as Beijing and Shanghai, and later other major cities, which had reintroduced six-year primary schools and accepted children at six and one-half years rather than seven.

The primary-school curriculum consisted of Yuwen (Chinese Language and Literature), mathematics, physical education, music, drawing, ideology & morality, and elementary introduction courses to physics, chemistry, history, geography, and biology (all grouped together under one "natural sciences" course), combined with practical work experiences around the school compound. General knowledge of politics and moral training, which stressed the love of the motherland, love of the political party, and love of the people (and previously love of Chairman Mao), is another part of the curriculum. As of the early 2020s, political studies classes are an increasingly important part of the primary school curriculum, with teaching on the Communist Party's history beginning in Kindergarten. A foreign language, often English, is introduced in about the third year. Chinese and mathematics accounted for about 60 percent of the scheduled class time; natural science and social science accounted for about 8 percent. Putonghua (commonly spoken language) was taught in regular schools and pinyin romanization in earlier years and kindergarten.

The Ministry of Education required that all primary schools offer courses on morality and ethics. Beginning in the fourth year, students usually had to perform productive labor two weeks per semester to relate classwork with production experience in workshops or on farms and relate it to academic study. Most schools had after-hour activities at least one day per week to involve students in recreation and community service. Between First and Third Year, Chinese students are encouraged to join the Red Pioneers to prepare them for eventual potential membership in the Communist Party.

By 1980 the percentage of students enrolled in primary schools were high, but the schools reported high dropout rates and regional enrollment gaps (most enrollees were concentrated in the cities). Only one in four counties had universal primary education. On average, 10 percent of the students dropped out between each year. During the 1979–83 period, the government acknowledged the "9-6-3" rule, that is, that nine of ten children began primary school, six completed it, and three graduated with good performance. This meant that only about 60 percent of primary students actually completed their five-year program of study and graduated, and only about 30 percent were regarded as having primary-level competence. Statistics in the mid-1980s showed that more rural girls than boys dropped out of school.

Within the framework of the Law on Nine-Year Compulsory Education and the general trend toward vocational and technical skills, attempts were made to accommodate and correct the gap between urban and rural education. Urban and key schools almost invariably operated on a six-day full-time schedule to prepare students for further education and high-level jobs. Rural schools generally operated on a flexible schedule geared to the needs of the agricultural seasons and sought to prepare students for adult life and manual labor in lower-skilled jobs. They also offered a more limited curriculum, often only Chinese, mathematics, and morals. To promote attendance and allow the class schedule and academic year to be completed, agricultural seasons were taken into account. School holidays were moved, school days shortened, and full-time, half-time, and spare-time classes offered in the slack agricultural seasons. Sometimes itinerant teachers were hired for mountain villages and served one village in the morning, another village in the afternoon.

Rural parents were generally aware that their children had limited opportunities to further their education. Some parents saw little use in having their children attend even primary school, especially after the establishment of the agricultural responsibility system. Under that system, parents preferred that their children work to increase family income – and withdrew them from school – for both long and short periods of time.

=== Preschool education ===
Preschool education, which began at age three, was another target of education reform in 1985. Preschool facilities were to be established in buildings made available by public enterprises, production teams, municipal authorities, local groups, and families. The government announced that it depended on individual organizations to sponsor their own preschool education and that preschool education was to become a part of the welfare services of various government organizations, institutes, and state- and collectively operated enterprises. Costs for preschool education varied according to services rendered. Officials also called for more preschool teachers with more appropriate training.

=== Special education ===
The 1985 National Conference on Education also recognized the importance of special education, in the form of programs for gifted children and for slow learners. Gifted children were allowed to skip years. Slow learners were encouraged to reach minimum standards, although those who did not maintain the pace seldom reached the next stage. For the most part, children with severe learning problems and those with handicaps and psychological needs were the responsibilities of their families. Extra provisions were made for blind and severely hearing-impaired children, although in 1984 special schools enrolled fewer than 2 percent of all eligible children in those categories. The China Welfare Fund, established in 1984, received state funding and had the right to solicit donations within China and from abroad, but special education has remained a low government priority.

Today, China has 1,540 schools for special education, with 375,000 students; more than 1,000 vocational training institutes for disabled people, nearly 3,000 standard vocational training and education institutes that also admit disabled people; more than 1,700 training organizations for rehabilitating hearing-impaired children, with over 100,000 trained and in-training children. In 2004, 4,112 disabled students entered ordinary schools of higher learning. Of disabled children receiving special education, 63.6 percent of total recruitment numbers and 66.2 percent of enrollment were in ordinary schools or special classes thereof.

== Secondary education ==
=== History ===
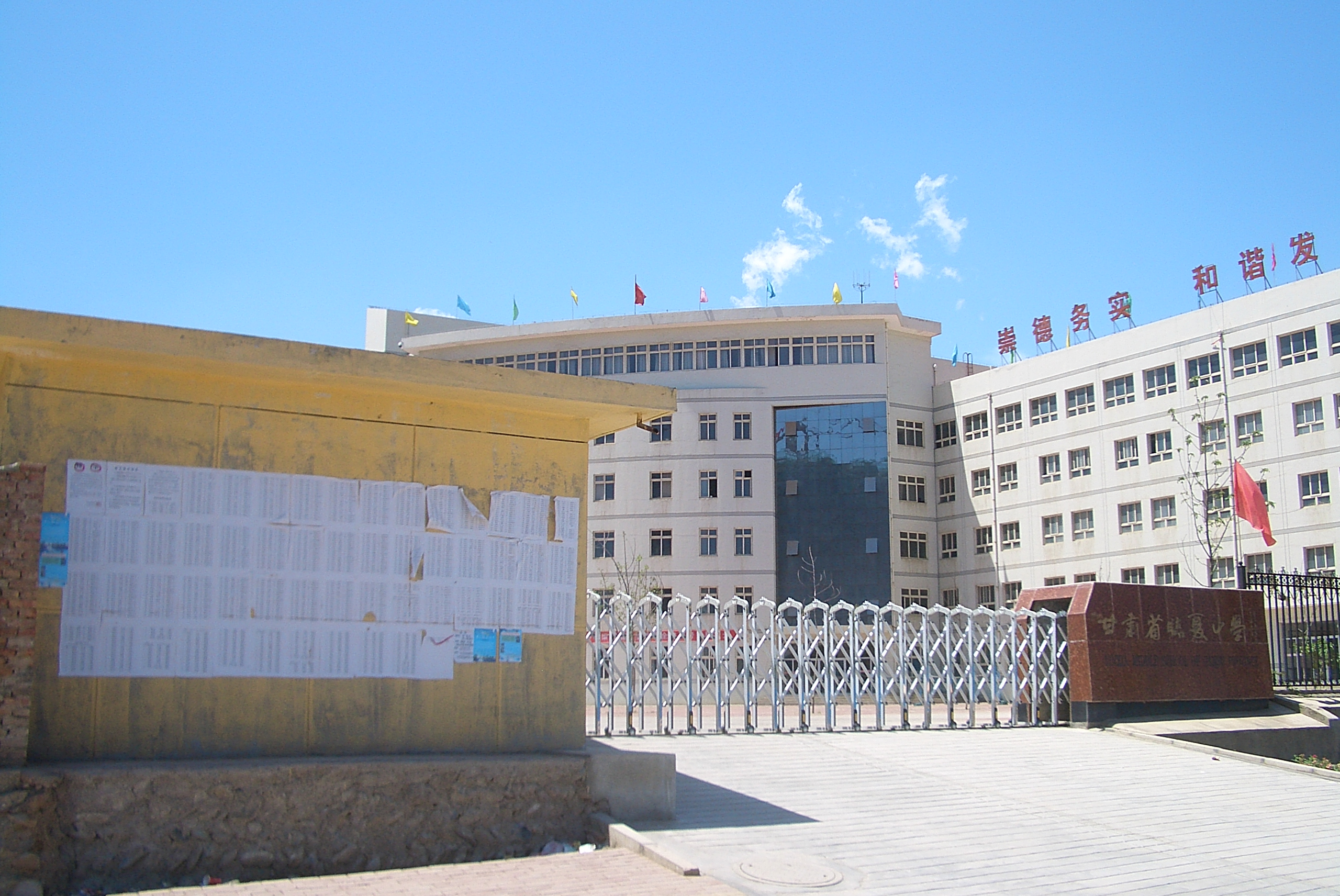
Lists of newly admitted students – complete with their home communities, test scores, and any extra points they derived due to their ethnicity or family size – posted outside of Linxia High School

Secondary education in China has a complicated history. In the early 1960s, education planners followed a policy called "walking on two legs", which established both regular academic schools and separate technical schools for vocational training. The rapid expansion of secondary education during the Cultural Revolution created serious problems; because resources were spread too thinly, educational quality declined. Further, this expansion was limited to regular secondary schools; technical schools were closed during the Cultural Revolution because they were viewed as an attempt to provide inferior education to children of worker and peasant families.

In the late 1970s, government and party representatives criticized what they termed the "unitary" approach of the 1960s, arguing that it ignored the need for two kinds of graduates: those with an academic education (college preparatory) and those with specialized technical education (vocational). Beginning in 1976 with the renewed emphasis on technical training, technical schools reopened, and their enrollments increased.

In the drive to spread vocational and technical education, regular secondary-school enrollments fell. By 1986 universal secondary education was part of the nine-year compulsory education law that made primary education (six years) and junior-high-school education (three years) mandatory. The desire to consolidate existing schools and to improve the quality of key middle schools was, however, under the education reform, more important than expanding enrollment.

=== Junior secondary ===
Junior secondary education is more commonly known as middle school or junior high school education, it consists of the last three years of compulsory education. Students who live in rural areas are often boarded into townships to receive their education. Students take a course generally referred to as "Ideological and Political Studies" which emphasizes communist values and communist institutions.

Subject	Year 7	Year 8	Year 9
Yuwen	Yes	Yes	Yes
Mathematics	Yes	Yes	Yes
English	Yes	Yes	Yes
Physics	No	Yes	Yes
Chemistry	No	No	Yes
Politics	Yes	Yes	Yes
History	Yes (Chinese history)	Yes (Chinese history)	Yes (World History)
Geography	Yes	Yes	No
Biology	Yes	Yes	No
Information Technology	Yes	Yes	
Physical Education	Yes	Yes	Yes

=== Senior secondary ===
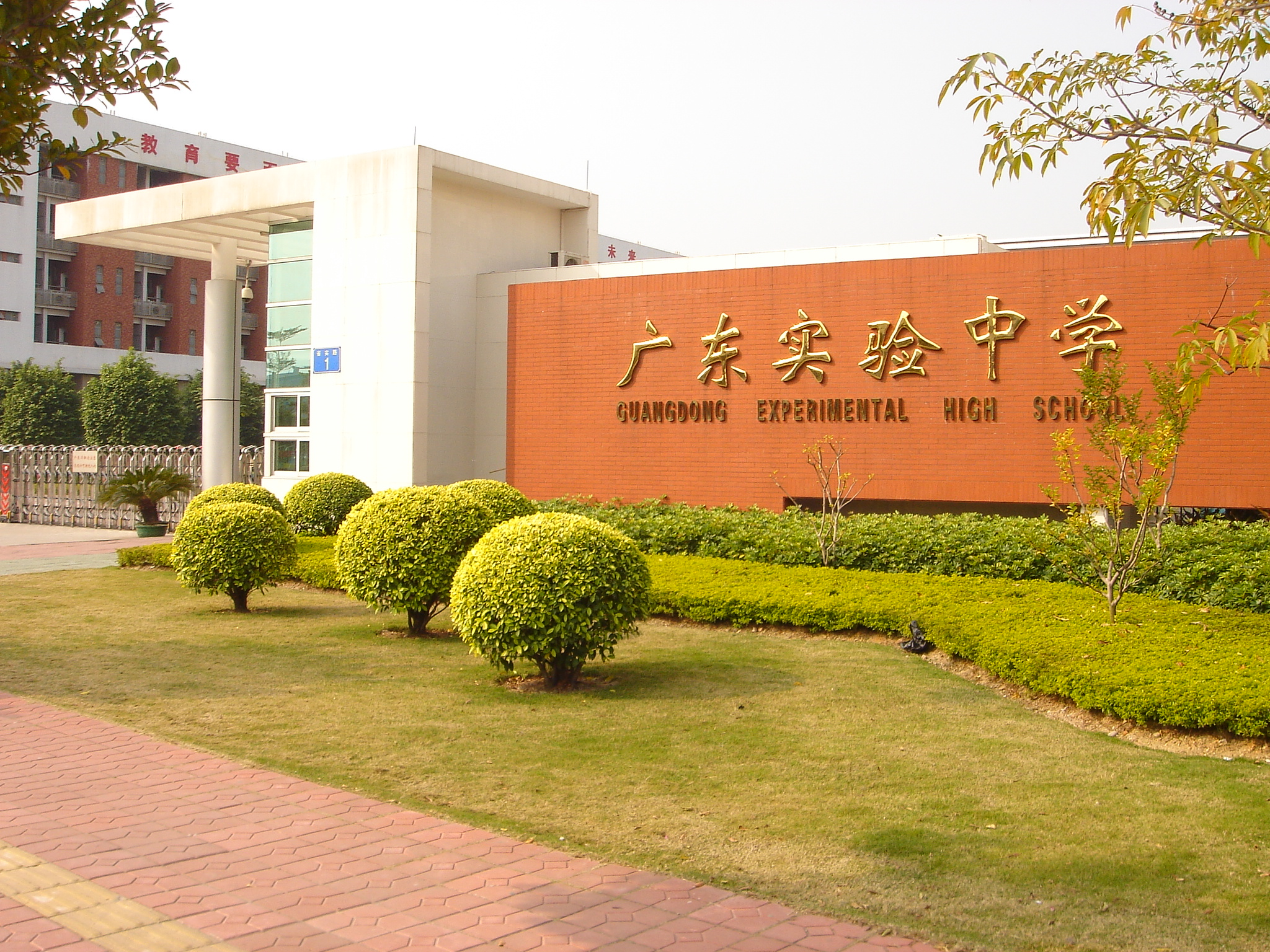
Guangdong Experimental High School, one of the key high schools based in Guangzhou, China

Senior secondary education often refers to three years of high school education, as from Year 10 to Year 12. Normally, students who have finished six years of primary education will continue three more years of academic study in middle schools as regulated by the Compulsory education law at the age of twelve. This is not compulsory for senior secondary education, where junior graduates may choose to continue a three-year academic education in academic high schools, which will eventually lead to university or to switch to a vocational course in vocational high schools.

Generally, high school years usually have two semesters, starting in September and February. In some rural areas, the operation may be subject to agricultural cycles. The number of lessons offered by a school every week is very subjective and largely depends on the school's resources. In addition to normal lessons, periods for private study and extracurricular activity are provided as well. The academic curriculum consists of Yuwen, Mathematics, English, Physics, Chemistry, Biology, Geography, History, Ideology & Political Science, Music, Fine Arts, PE, Technology, Computing, etc. Some schools may also offer vocational subjects. Generally speaking, Yuwen, Mathematics, and English are considered as three main subjects as they will definitely be examined in Gaokao. In most provinces, students also need to be examined in either natural sciences, which incorporate Physics, Chemistry and Biology, or social sciences, which incorporate Geography, History, and Ideology & Political Science. Required high school political courses elaborate on Marxism, Maoism, theory contributions of subsequent leaders, and the communist institutions of China.

In China, a senior high school graduate will be considered as an educated person, although the majority of graduates will go on to universities or vocational colleges. Given that the competition for limited university places is extremely intense, most high schools are evaluated by their academic performance in Gaokao by parents and students.

==== Admissions and Zhongkao ====
Zhongkao (中考), the Senior High School Entrance Examination, is the academic examination held annually in China to distinguish junior graduates. Most commonly, students will be tested in Yuwen, Mathematics, English, Physics, Chemistry, Political Science and PE. Scoring systems vary across regions.

Admission for senior high schools, especially selective high schools, is somewhat similar to the one for universities in China. Students will go through an application system where they may choose the high schools at which they wish to study in an order to their preference before the high schools set out their entrance requirements. Once this is completed and the high schools will announce their requirements based on this information and the places they will offer in that year. For instance, if the school offers 800 places in that year, the results offered by the 800th intake student will be the standard requirements. So effectively, this ensures the school selects the top candidates in all the students who have applied to said school in that academic year. The severe competition only occurs in the very top high schools, normally, most students will have sufficient results for them to continue their secondary education if they wish to.

There are other official rules of admission in certain top high schools. If a prestigious senior high school wants to admit 800 students a year, the admissions office ranks students' scores from highest to lowest and then selects their first 700 students. The other 100 positions are provided to the students who do not meet the required standard, but still want to study at that school. These prospects need to pay extra school fees. A student cannot perform badly in Zhongkao, if their scores are close to the required standard, they could still study in that top school if they can afford the expenses. Those who study in that high school must place a maximum of two points below the standard requirement. Usually, 0.5 points is a standard. For instance, if a student is two points below the standard requirement, they pay four times as much as the student who gets 0.5 points below the standard requirement. The admissions of the 100 students who are required to pay the school fees usually do not get the same admission letters as normal students receive, but they can still study and live with normal students in the same high school, with the same teacher.

==== Vocational and technical schools ====
The "Law on Vocational Education" was issued in 1996. Vocational education embraces higher vocational schools, secondary skill schools, vestibule schools, vocational high schools, job-finding centers, and other adult skills and social training institutes. To enable vocational education to better accommodate the demands of economic re-structuring and urbanization, in recent years the government has remodeled vocational education, oriented towards obtaining employment and focusing on two major vocational education projects to meet society's ever more acute demand for high quality, skilled workers. These are cultivating skilled workers urgently needed in modern manufacturing and service industries, and training rural laborers moving to urban areas. To accelerate vocational education in western areas, the Central Government has used government bonds to build 186 vocational education centers in impoverished western area counties.

Both regular and vocational secondary schools sought to serve modernization needs. A number of technical and "skilled-worker" training schools reopened after the Cultural Revolution, and an effort was made to provide exposure to vocational subjects in general secondary schools (by offering courses in the industry, services, business, and agriculture). By 1985 there were almost 3 million vocational and technical students.

Under the educational reform tenets, polytechnic colleges were to give priority to admitting secondary vocational and technical school graduates and providing on-the-job training for qualified workers. Education reformers continued to press for the conversion of about 50 percent of upper secondary education into vocational education, which traditionally had been weak in the rural areas. Regular senior high schools were to be converted into vocational secondary schools, and vocational training classes were to be established in some senior middle schools. Diversion of students from academic to technical education was intended to alleviate skill shortages and to reduce the competition for university enrollment.

Although enrollment in technical schools of various kinds had not yet increased enough to compensate for decreasing enrollments in regular senior high schools, the proportion of vocational and technical students to total senior-high-school students increased from about 5 percent in 1978 to almost 36 percent in 1985, although development was uneven. Further, to encourage greater numbers of junior-high-school graduates to enter technical schools, vocational and technical school graduates were given priority in job assignments, while other job seekers had to take technical tests.

In 1987 there were four kinds of secondary vocational and technical schools:

1. Technical schools, which offered a four-year, post-junior high course and two- to three-year post-senior high training in such fields as commerce, legal work, fine arts, and forestry;
2. Workers' training schools, which accepted students whose senior-high-school education consisted of two years of training in such trades as carpentry and welding;
3. Vocational technical schools, which accepted either junior-or senior-high-school students for one- to three-year courses in cooking, tailoring, photography, and other services; and
4. Agricultural secondary schools, which offered basic subjects and agricultural science.

These technical schools had several hundred different programs. Their narrow specializations had advantages in that they offered in-depth training, reducing the need for on-the-job training and thereby lowering learning time and costs. Moreover, students were more motivated to study if there were links between training and future jobs. Much of the training could be done at existing enterprises, where staff and equipment was available at little additional cost.

There were some disadvantages to this system. Under the Four Modernizations, technically trained generalists were needed more than highly specialized technicians. Also, highly specialized equipment and staff were underused, and there was an overall shortage of specialized facilities to conduct training. In addition, large expenses were incurred in providing the necessary facilities and staff, and the trend in some government technical agencies was toward more general technical and vocational education.

Further, the dropout rate continued to have a negative effect on the labor pool as upper-secondary-school technical students dropped out and as the percentage of lower-secondary-school graduates entering the labor market without job training increased. Occupational rigidity and the geographic immobility of the population, particularly in rural areas, further limited educational choices.

Although there were 668,000 new polytechnic school enrollments in 1985, the Seventh Five-Year Plan called for annual increases of 2 million mid-level skilled workers and 400,000 senior technicians, indicating that enrollment levels were still far from sufficient. To improve the situation, in July 1986 officials from the State Education Commission, State Planning Commission, and Ministry of Labor and Personnel convened a national conference on developing China's technical and vocational education. It was decided that technical and vocational education in rural areas should accommodate local conditions and be conducted on a short-term basis. Where conditions permitted, the emphasis would be placed on organizing technical schools and short-term training classes. To alleviate the shortage of teachers, vocational and technical teachers' colleges were to be reformed and other colleges and universities were to be mobilized for assistance. The State Council decided to improve training for workers who had passed technical examinations (as opposed to unskilled workers) was intended to reinforce the development of vocational and technical schools.

Expanding and improving secondary vocational education has long been an objective of China's educational reformers, for vocational schools are seen as those which are best placed to address (by providing trained workers) the rising needs of the nation's expanding economy, especially its manufacturing and industrial sectors. Without an educated and trained workforce, China cannot have economic, hence social and national, development. Yet, given a finite, and often quite limited, a pot of money for secondary schools, and allocation competition/conflict necessarily exists between its two sub-sectors: general education and vocational/technical education.

Regardless, an over-enrollment in the latter has been the overall result of the mid-1980s reforms. Yet firms that must seek workers from this graduate pool have remained unimpressed with the quality of recruits and have had to rely on their own job-training programs that provide re-education for their newly hired workers. The public, also, has not been very enthusiastic over vocational secondary education which, unlike general education, does not lead to the possibility of higher education. The public's perception is that these schools provide little more than a dead end for their children. Also, vocational institutions are more expensive to run than their counterparts in general education, and they have not had sufficient money to modernize their facilities, as China's modernizing national economy demands. By mid-decade of the 21st Century, therefore, academics and policy-makers alike began to question the policy that pours funds into vocational schools that do not do their intended function.

== Private education ==
In 2021, 56,000,000 students attended 190,000 privately operated schools, with 12,000 of them having primary and/or junior high school levels. These students represent about 20% of all students in China. By 2021, the Chinese central government was nationalizing some for-profit private schools.

Private schools have pioneered cooperation with foreign partners in the running of schools and many foreign universities have entered China this way, which has both improved the quality of China's education resources and opened new channels for students' further studies.

In January 2017, State Council of China stated that the China Communist party's leadership over private schools should be strengthened, CCP's organizations should be established in private schools, and the party organizations of private schools should play a political core role and firmly control the private schools' school orientation: Training socialist builders and successors.

== Supplemental classes and tutoring ==
A 2019 survey conducted by Tencent found that 88.7% of students in fourth through first tier cities took supplemental classes outside of school and that the average was 2.1 supplemental classes per student.

In 2021, the government shutdown private tutoring for schoolchildren based on the rationale that rising educational costs were antithetical to the goals of common prosperity. Shutting down private tutoring was intended to narrow the education gap between rich and poor. Rules issued in July 2021 prohibits new registration of private tuition tutoring centers and required existing centers to re-organize as non-profits. Tuition centers are prohibited from being listed on the stock market or receiving "excessive capital." They are no longer permitted to offer tutoring on the weekends or during public holidays.

Nature schools (ziran xuexigo) are offered by companies and organizations outside of the formal school system. These programs seek to supplement environmental education with hands-on environmental learning not typically available through schools.

== International education ==
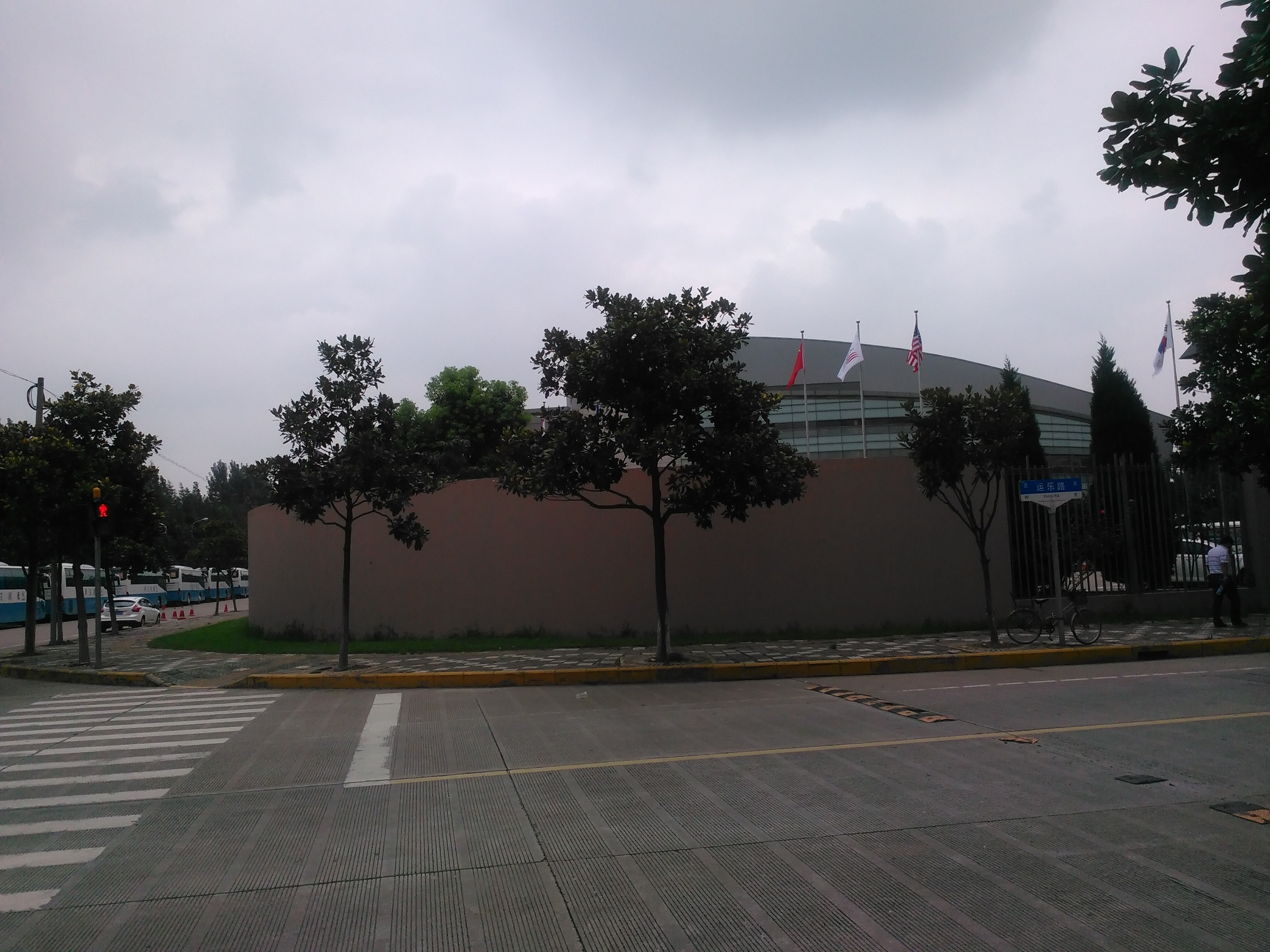
Shanghai American School Puxi Campus

As of January 2021, SICAS –Study In China Admission System listed China as having 300 international schools. ISC defines an 'international school' in the following terms: "ISC includes an international school if the school delivers a curriculum to any combination of pre-school, primary or secondary students, wholly or partly in English outside an English-speaking country, or if a school in a country where English is one of the official languages offers an English-medium curriculum other than the country's national curriculum and is international in its orientation." This definition is used by publications including The Economist. There were 177,400 students enrolled in international schools in 2014.

2013 Nicholas Brummitt, managing director of ISC, reported that there were 338 international schools in Mainland China as of 2013, with 184,073 students. Slightly more than half of the international schools are in the major expatriate areas of China: Beijing, Shanghai, and Guangdong Province, while the remainder is in other areas. Beijing, Shanghai, and Guangzhou have the most international schools while significant numbers also exist in Shenzhen and Chengdu.

Many international schools in Beijing and Shanghai, in accordance with Chinese law, are only permitted to enroll students who have citizenship in areas other than Mainland China. This is because Mainland Chinese students are required to have a certain curriculum, and schools that do not include this curriculum are not permitted to enroll Mainlanders. Mainlander children who hold foreign passports are permitted to attend these schools. As of 2014, 19 international schools in Beijing are restricted to non-Mainlanders. There are also schools using international curricula that accept both Mainlander and non-Mainlander students.

By 2004, increased international business operations resulted in an increase of foreign children. Many of the original post-1949 international schools used International Baccalaureate and North American curricula. By 2004 many international schools in Beijing and Shanghai using the British curricula had opened. The number of international schools in China grew from 22 schools in 2001 to 338 schools in 2013; over the same period, enrollment in international schools rose 25 times to 184,073 students. By the 2010s, many Mainland Chinese parents began sending their children to international schools that accept Mainland students to increase their children's chances of going overseas.

There is an increasing number of international universities representation in China in recent years, including but not limited to CEIBS and Yale Center Beijing. Columbia Global Centers Beijing opened in 2009 and Harvard Institute Shanghai opened in 2010.

Cornell University Global is planning to have presence in Beijing and Shanghai. Stanford University established an academic center in Peking University. Washington University in St. Louis established an EMBA program with Fudan University in 2002 which has since been constantly ranked as one of the best in the world.

== Higher education ==
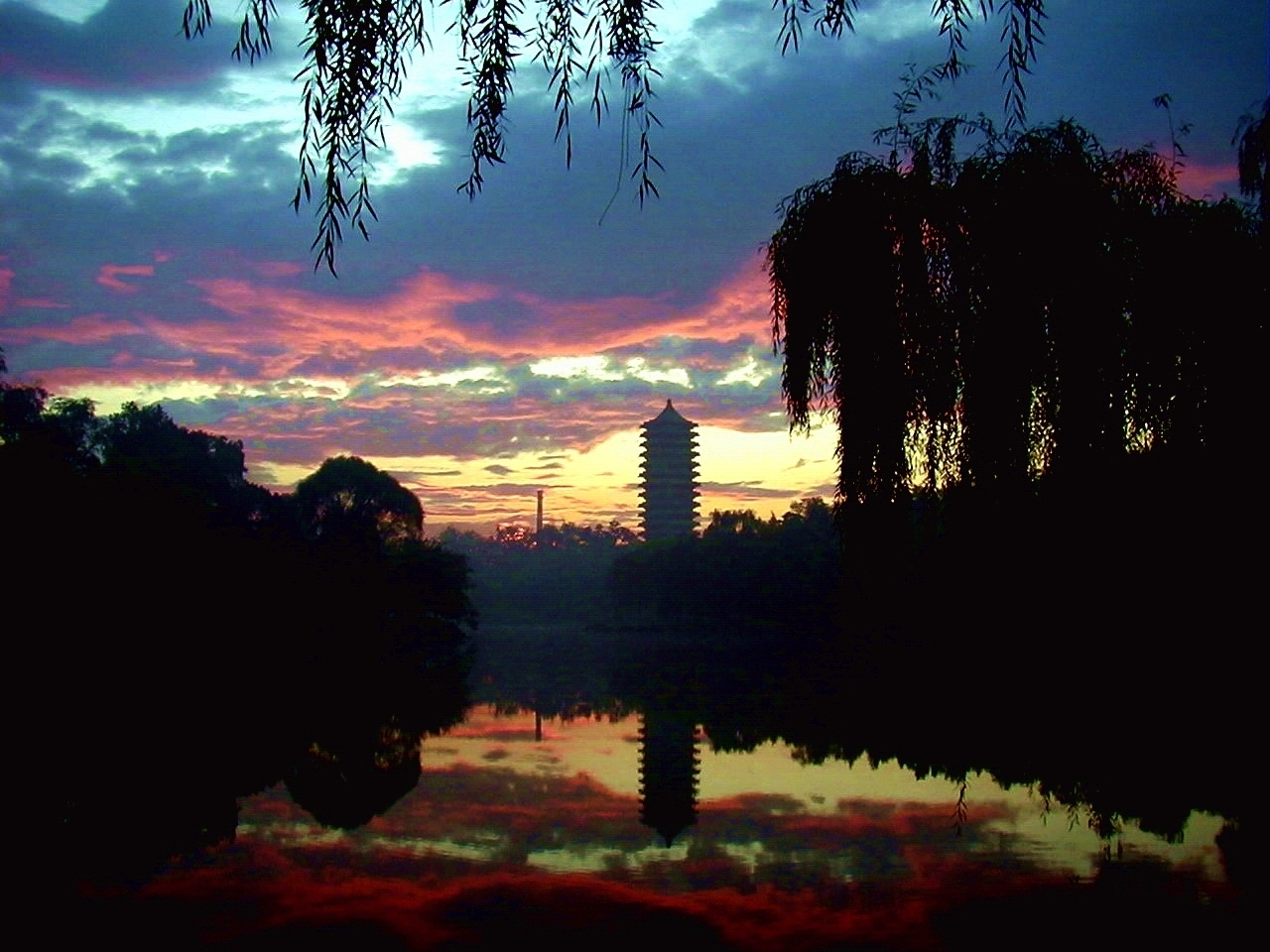
Weiming Lake of Peking University

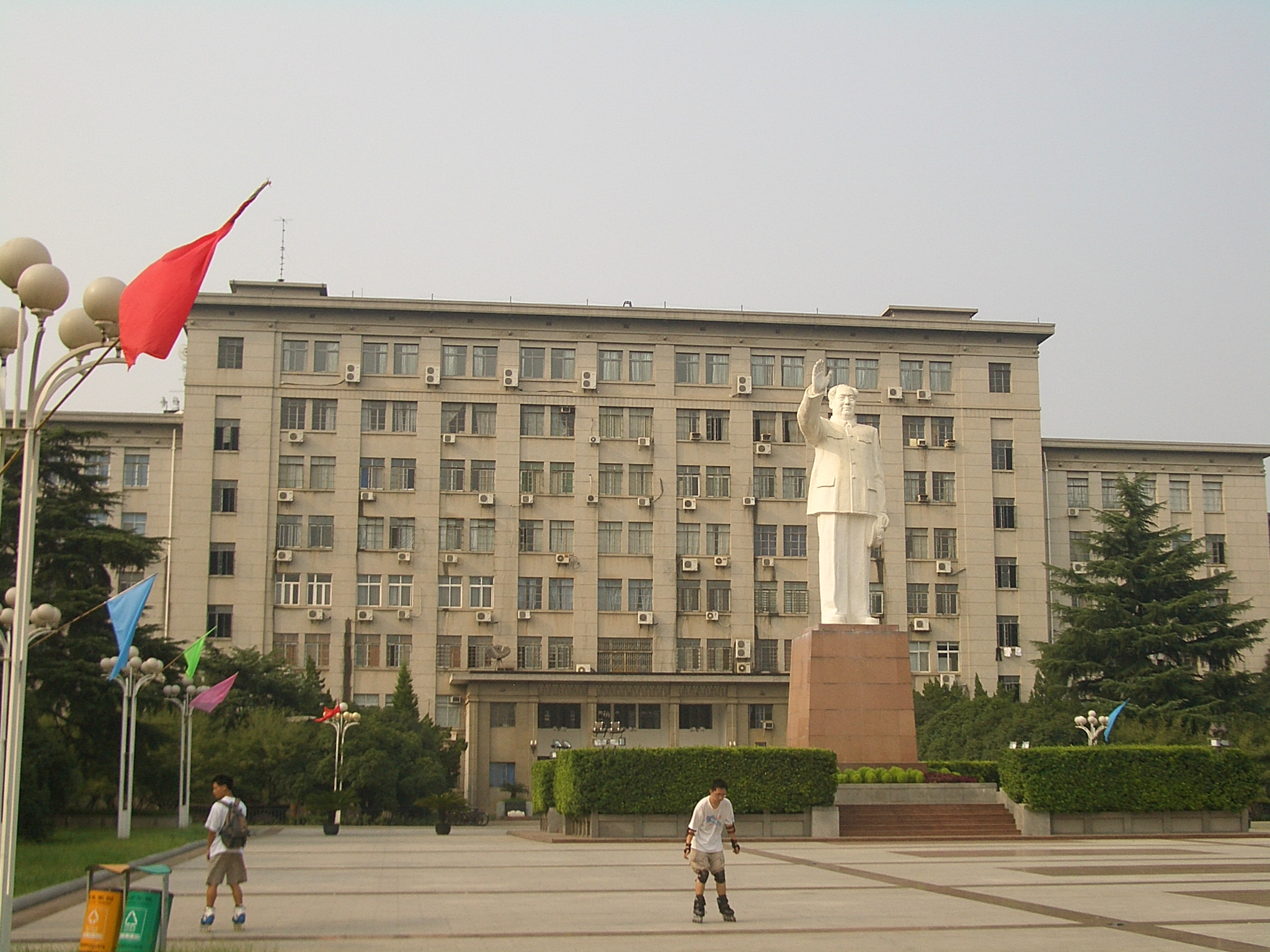
Huazhong University of Science and Technology in Wuhan

Higher education in China is the largest in the world. By the end of 2021, there were over 3,000 colleges and universities, with over 44.3 million students enrolled in mainland China and 240 million Chinese citizens having received high education. The gross rate of enrollment in schools of higher learning reached 58.42 percent in 2020. Detailed national statistics from 2021 show that Chinese institutions awarded a large number of graduate degrees, about 700 700 master's degrees out of roughly 772 800 total graduate degrees that year. In 2024, China awarded more than 97 000 PhD degrees, nearly double the number from a decade earlier.

In 2015, a tertiary education development initiative called Double First-Class Construction designed by the People's Republic of China government, which aims to comprehensively develop elite Chinese universities into world-class institutions through developing and strengthening their individual faculty departments by the end of 2050. In 2017, the full list of Double First-Class Construction was published. 140 universities have been included in the plan and approved as Double First Class Universities, making up less than 5% of the total number of universities and colleges in China.

=== Background ===
The quality of higher education in modern China has changed at various times, reflecting shifts in the political policies implemented by the central government. Following the founding of the PRC, in 1949, the Chinese government's educational focus was largely on political "re-education". In periods of political upheavals, such as the Great Leap Forward and the Cultural Revolution, ideology was stressed over professional or technical competence. During the early stages of the Cultural Revolution (1966–1969), tens of thousands of college students joined Red Guard organizations, which persecuted many university faculty members as "counter-revolutionaries" and effectively closed China's universities. When universities reopened in the early 1970s, enrollments were reduced from pre-Cultural Revolution levels, and admission was restricted to individuals who had been recommended by their work unit (danwei), possessed good political credentials, and had distinguished themselves in manual labor. In the absence of stringent and reasonably objective entrance examinations, political connections became increasingly important in securing the recommendations and political dossiers necessary to qualify for university admission. As a result, the decline in educational quality was profound. Deng Xiaoping reportedly wrote Mao Zedong in 1975 that university graduates were "not even capable of reading a book" in their own fields when they left the university. University faculty and administrators were demoralized by the political aspects of the university system.

Efforts made in 1975 to improve educational quality were unsuccessful. By 1980, it appeared doubtful that the politically oriented admission criteria had accomplished even the purpose of increasing enrollment of workers and peasant children. Successful candidates for university entrance were usually children of cadres and officials who used personal connections that allowed them to "enter through the back door." Students from officials' families would accept the requisite minimum two-year work assignment in the countryside, often in a suburban location that allowed them to remain close to their families. Village cadres, anxious to please the parents/officials, gladly recommended these youths for university placement after the labor requirement had been met. The child of an official family was then on his or her way to a university without having the academic ability, a record of political activism, or a distinguished work record.

After the death of Mao Zedong in 1976, steps were taken to improve educational quality by establishing order and stability, calling for an end to political contention on university campuses, and expanding university enrollments. This pressure to maintain quality and minimize expenditures led to efforts both to run existing institutions more efficiently and to develop other college and university programs. As a result, labor colleges for training agro-technicians and factory-run colleges for providing technical education for workers were established. In addition, eighty-eight institutions and key universities were provided with special funding, top students and faculty members, and other support, and they recruited the most academically qualified students without regard to family background or political activism. The State Council officially reinstated the college entrance examination system on October 12, 1977, when it forwarded the Opinions on Enrollment in Higher Education in 1977 to the Ministry of Education.

=== Modernization goals in the 1980s ===
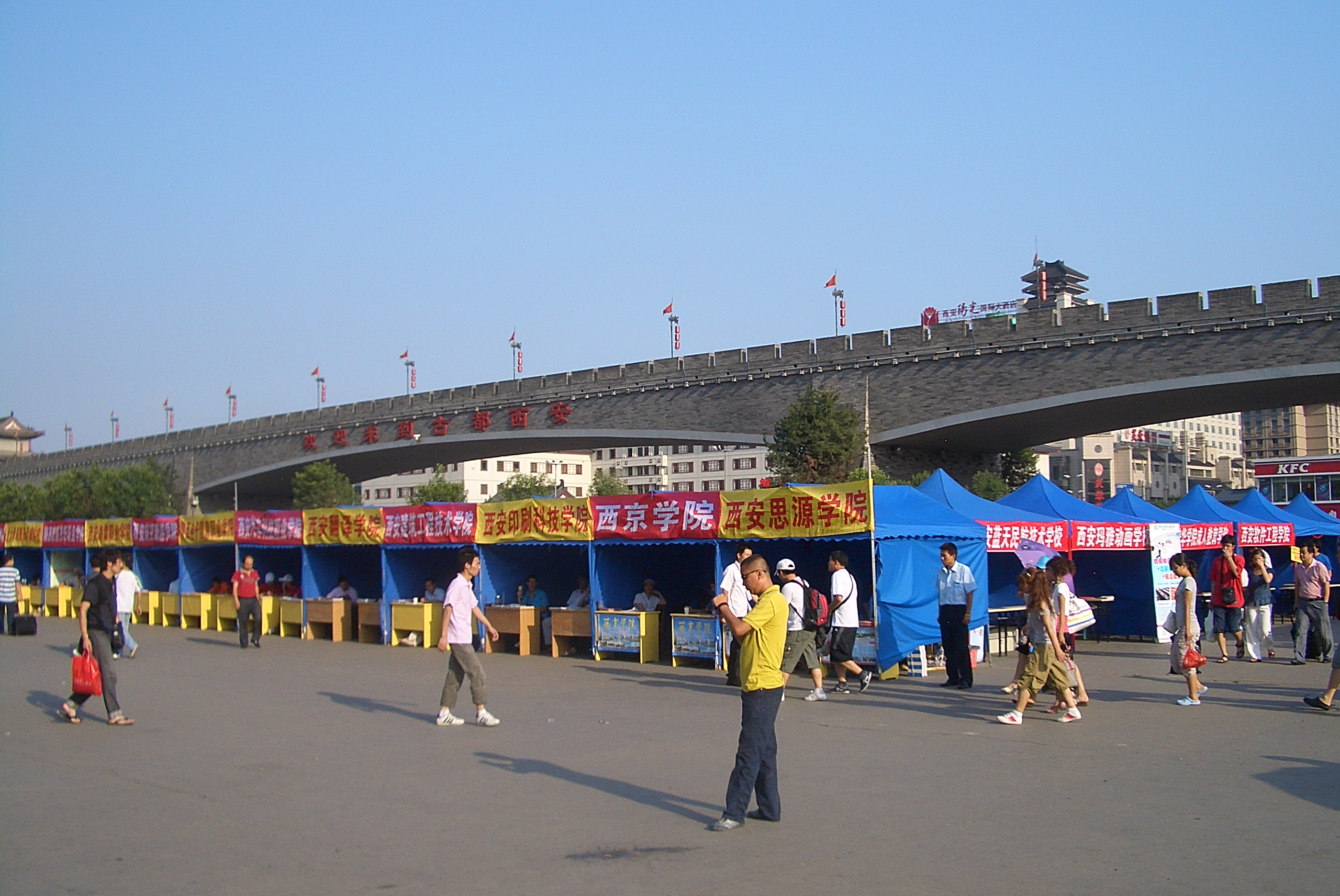
Representatives of Xi'an universities ready to welcome new students at booths set up outside of the city's train station throughout the late summer

The commitment to the Four Modernizations required great advances in science and technology. Under the modernization program, higher education was to be the cornerstone for training and research. Because modernization depended on a vastly increased and improved capability to train scientists and engineers for needed breakthroughs, the renewed concern for higher education and academic quality – and the central role that the sciences were expected to play in the Four Modernizations – highlighted the need for scientific research and training. This concern can be traced to the critical personnel shortages and qualitative deficiencies in the sciences resulting from the unproductive years of the Cultural Revolution when higher education was shut down. In response to the need for scientific training, the Sixth Plenum of the Twelfth National Party Congress Central Committee, held in September 1986, adopted a resolution on the guiding principles for building a socialist society that strongly emphasized the importance of education and science.

Reformers realized that the higher education system was far from meeting modernization goals and that additional changes were needed. The Provisional Regulations Concerning the Management of Institutions of Higher Learning, promulgated by the State Council in 1986, initiated vast changes in administration and adjusted educational opportunity, direction, and content. With the increased independence accorded under the education reform, universities and colleges were able to choose their own teaching plans and curricula; to accept projects from or cooperate with other socialist establishments for scientific research and technical development in setting up "combines" involving teaching, scientific research, and production; to suggest appointments and removals of vice presidents and other staff members; to take charge of the distribution of capital construction investment and funds allocated by the state, and to be responsible for the development of international exchanges by using their own funds.

The changes also allowed the universities to accept financial aid from work units and decide how this money was to be used without asking for more money from departments in charge of education. Further, higher education institutions and work units could sign contracts for the training of students.

Higher education institutions also were assigned a greater role in running inter-regional and inter-departmental schools. Within their state-approved budgets, universities secured more freedom to allocate funds as they saw fit and to use the income from tuition and technical and advisory services for their own development, including collective welfare and bonuses.

There also was a renewed interest in television, radio, and correspondence classes (see distance learning and electronic learning). Some of the courses, particularly in the college-run factories, were serious, full-time enterprises, with a two- to three-year curriculum.

==== Entrance examinations and admission criteria ====
National examinations to select students for higher education (and positions of leadership) were an important part of China's culture, and, traditionally, entrance to a higher education institution is considered prestigious. Although the examination system for admission to colleges and universities has undergone many changes since the Cultural Revolution, it remains the basis for recruiting academically able students. When higher education institutions were reopened in the early 1970s, candidates for entrance examinations had to be senior-middle-school graduates or the equivalent, generally below twenty-six years of age. Work experience requirements were eliminated, but workers and staff members needed permission from their enterprises to take the examinations.

Each provincial-level unit was assigned a quota of students to be admitted to key universities, the second quota of students for regular universities within that administrative division, and a third quota of students from other provinces, autonomous regions, and special municipalities who would be admitted to institutions operated at the provincial level. Provincial-level administrative units selected students with outstanding records to take the examinations. Additionally, preselection examinations were organized by the provinces, autonomous regions, and special municipalities for potential students (from three to five times the number of places allotted). These candidates were actively encouraged to take the examination to ensure that a sufficient number of good applicants would be available. Cadres with at least two years of work experience were recruited for selected departments in a small number of universities on an experimental basis. Preferential admission treatment (in spite of lower test scores) was given to minority candidates, students from disadvantaged areas, and those who agreed in advance to work in less developed regions after graduation.

In December 1977, when uniform national examinations were reinstated, 5.7 million students took the examinations, although university placement was available for only the 273,000 applicants with the highest scores. The admission rate of 4.8% was the lowest in the history of Chinese higher education, the admitted students are known as the Class of 1977. In July 1984, about 1.6 million candidates (30,000 fewer than in 1983) took the entrance examinations for the 430,000 places in China's more than 900 colleges and universities. Of the 1.6 million examinees, more than 1 million took the test for placement in science and engineering colleges; 415,000 for places in liberal arts colleges; 88,000 for placement in foreign language institutions; and 15,000 for placement in sports universities and schools. More than 100,000 of the candidates were from national minority groups. A year later, there were approximately 1.8 million students taking the three-day college entrance examination to compete for 560,000 places. Liberal arts candidates were tested on politics, Yuwen, mathematics, foreign languages, history, and geography. Science and engineering candidates were tested on politics, Yuwen, mathematics, chemistry, and biology. Entrance examinations also were given in 1985 for professional and technical schools, which sought to enroll 550,000 new students.

Other innovations in enrollment practices, included allowing colleges and universities to admit students with good academic records but relatively low entrance-examination scores. Some colleges were allowed to try an experimental student recommendation system – fixed at 2 percent of the total enrollment for regular colleges and 5 percent for teachers' colleges – instead of the traditional entrance examination. A minimum national examination score was established for admission to specific departments at specially designated colleges and universities, and the minimum score for admission to other universities was set by provincial-level authorities. Key universities established separate classes for minorities. When several applicants attained the minimum test score, the school had the option of making a selection, a policy that gave university faculty and administrators a certain amount of discretion but still protected admission according to academic ability.

In addition to the written examination, university applicants had to pass a physical examination and a political screening. Less than 2 percent of the students who passed the written test were eliminated for reasons of poor health. The number disqualified for political reasons was known, but publicly the party maintained that the number was very small and that it sought to ensure that only the most able students actually entered colleges and universities.

By 1985 the number of institutions of higher learning had again increased – to slightly more than 1,000. The State Education Commission and the Ministry of Finance issued a joint declaration for nationwide unified enrollment of adult students – not the regular secondary-school graduates but the members of the workforce who qualified for admission by taking a test. The State Education Commission established unified questions and time and evaluation criteria for the test and authorized provinces, autonomous regions, and special municipalities to administer the test, grade the papers in a uniform manner, and determine the minimum points required for admission. The various schools were to enroll students according to the results. Adult students needed to have the educational equivalent of senior-middle-school graduates, and those applying for release or partial release from work to study were to be under forty years of age. Staff members and workers were to apply to study job-related subjects with review by and approval of their respective work units. If employers paid for the college courses, the workers had to take entrance examinations. In 1985 colleges enrolled 33,000 employees from various enterprises and companies, approximately 6 percent of the total college enrollment.

In 1985 state quotas for university places were set, allowing both for students sponsored by institutions and for those paying their own expenses. This policy was a change from the previous system in which all students were enrolled according to guidelines established in Beijing. All students except those at military school or police academy, those who had financial difficulties, and those who were to work under adverse conditions after graduation had to pay for their own tuition, accommodations, and miscellaneous expenses.

==== Changes in enrollment and assignment policies ====
The children enrollment and graduate assignment system also were changed to reflect more closely the personnel needs of modernization. By 1986 the state was responsible for drafting the enrollment plan, which took into account future personnel demands, the need to recruit students from outlying regions, and the needs of trades and professions with adverse working conditions. Moreover, a certain number of graduates to be trained for the People's Liberation Army were included in the state enrollment plan. In most cases, enrollment in higher education institutions at the employers' request was extended as a supplement to the state student enrollment plan. Employers were to pay a percentage of training fees, and students were to fulfill contractual obligations to the employers after graduation. The small number of students who attended colleges and universities at their own expense could be enrolled in addition to those in the state plan.

Accompanying the changes in enrollment practices were reforms (adopted 1986) in the faculty appointment system, which ended the "iron rice bowl" employment system and permitted colleges and universities to decide which academic departments, which academic majors, and how many teachers they needed. Teachers in institutions of higher learning were hired on a basis, usually for two to four years at a time. The teaching positions available on basis were teaching assistant, lecturer, associate professor, and professor. The system was tested in eight major universities in Beijing and Shanghai before it was instituted nationwide at the end of 1985. University presidents headed groups in charge of appointing professors, lecturers, and teaching assistants according to their academic levels and teaching abilities, and a more rational wage system, geared to different job levels, was inaugurated. Universities and colleges with surplus professors and researchers were advised to grant them appropriate academic titles and encourage them to work for their current pay in schools of higher learning where they were needed. The new system was to be extended to schools of all kinds and other education departments within two years.

Under the 1985 reforms, all graduates were assigned jobs by the state; a central government placement agency told the schools where to send graduates. By 1985 Tsinghua University and a few other universities were experimenting with a system that allowed graduates to accept job offers or to look for their own positions. For example, of 1,900 Tsinghua University graduates in 1985, 1,200 went on to graduate school, 48 looked for their own jobs, and the remainder were assigned jobs by the school after consultation with the students. The college students and postgraduates scheduled to graduate in 1986 were assigned primarily to work in forestry, education, textiles, and the armaments industry. Graduates still were needed in civil engineering, computer science, and finance.

==== Scholarship and loan system ====
In July 1986 the State Council announced that the stipend system for university and college students would be replaced with a new scholarship and loan system. The new system, to be tested in selected institutions during the 1986–87 academic year, was designed to help students who could not cover their own living expenses but who studied hard, obeyed state laws, and observed discipline codes. Students eligible for financial aid were to apply to the schools and the China Industrial and Commercial Bank for low-interest loans. Three categories of students eligible for aid were established: top students encouraged to attain all-around excellence; students specializing in education, agriculture, forestry, sports, and marine navigation; and students willing to work in poor, remote, and border regions or under harsh conditions, such as in mining and engineering. In addition, free tuition and board were to be offered at military school, and the graduates were required to join the army for at least five years in relevant positions. For those who worked in an approved rural position after graduation, student loans would be paid off by his or her employer, such as a school, in a lump sum. And the money was to be repaid to the employer by the student through five years of payroll deductions.

==== Study abroad ====
In addition to loans, another means of raising educational quality, particularly in science, was to send students abroad to study. A large number of Chinese students studied in the Soviet Union before educational links and other cooperative programs with the Soviet Union were severed in the late 1950s (see Sino-Soviet split). In the 1960s and 1970s, China continued to send a small number of students abroad, primarily to European universities. In October 1978 Chinese students began to arrive in the United States; their numbers accelerated after normalization of relations between the two countries in January 1979, a policy consistent with modernization needs. Although figures vary, more than 36,000 students, including 7,000 self-supporting students (those who paid their own way, received scholarships from host institutions, or received help from relatives and "foreign friends"), studied in 14 countries between 1978 and 1984. Of this total, 78 percent were technical personnel sent abroad for advanced study. As of mid-1986, there were 15,000 Chinese scholars and graduates in American universities, compared with a total of 19,000 scholars sent between 1979 and 1983.

Chinese students sent to the United States generally were not typical undergraduates or graduate students but were mid-career scientists, often thirty-five to forty-five years of age, seeking advanced training in their areas of specialization. Often they were individuals of exceptional ability who occupied responsible positions in Chinese universities and research institutions. Fewer than 15 percent of the earliest arrivals were degree candidates. Nearly all the visiting scholars were in scientific fields.

Multiple opinion studies have shown that the longer Chinese students study abroad, the better their view of China becomes. According to the Ministry of Education approximately 86% of students who completed their studies abroad between 2000 and 2019 returned to China.

==== Educational investment ====
Many of the problems that had hindered higher educational development in the past continued in 1987. Funding remained a major problem because science and technology study and research and study abroad were expensive. Because education was competing with other modernization programs, the capital was critically short. Another concern was whether or not the Chinese economy was sufficiently advanced to make efficient use of the highly trained technical personnel it planned to educate. For example, some observers believed that it would be more realistic to train a literate workforce of low-level technicians instead of research scientists. Moreover, it was feared that using an examination to recruit the most able students might advance people who were merely good at taking examinations. Educational reforms also made some people uncomfortable by criticizing the traditional practice of rote memorization and promoting innovative teaching and study methods.

The prestige associated with higher education caused a demand for it. But many qualified youths were unable to attend colleges and universities because China could not finance enough university places for them. To help meet the demand and to educate a highly trained, specialized workforce, China established alternate forms of higher education – such as spare-time, part-time, and radio and television universities.

China could not afford a heavy investment, either ideologically or financially, in the education of a few students. Since 1978 China's leaders have modified the policy of concentrating education resources at the university level, which, although designed to facilitate modernization, conflicted directly with the party's principles. The policies that produced an educated elite also siphoned off resources that might have been used to accomplish the compulsory nine-year education more speedily and to equalize educational opportunities in the city and the countryside. The policy of key schools has been modified over the years. Nevertheless, China's leaders believe an educated elite is necessary to reach modernization goals. Corruption has been increasingly problematic for rural schools. Because the educational funding is distributed from the top down, each layer of bureaucracy has tended to siphon off more than its share of funding, leaving too little for the bottom rural level.

Families have had to cover for government indifference by making personal investments in their children's education. Chinese economy may not be able to effectively absorb the resulting influx of college graduates, who may need to settle for lower paying jobs, if they can find those.

=== Reform in the 21st century ===
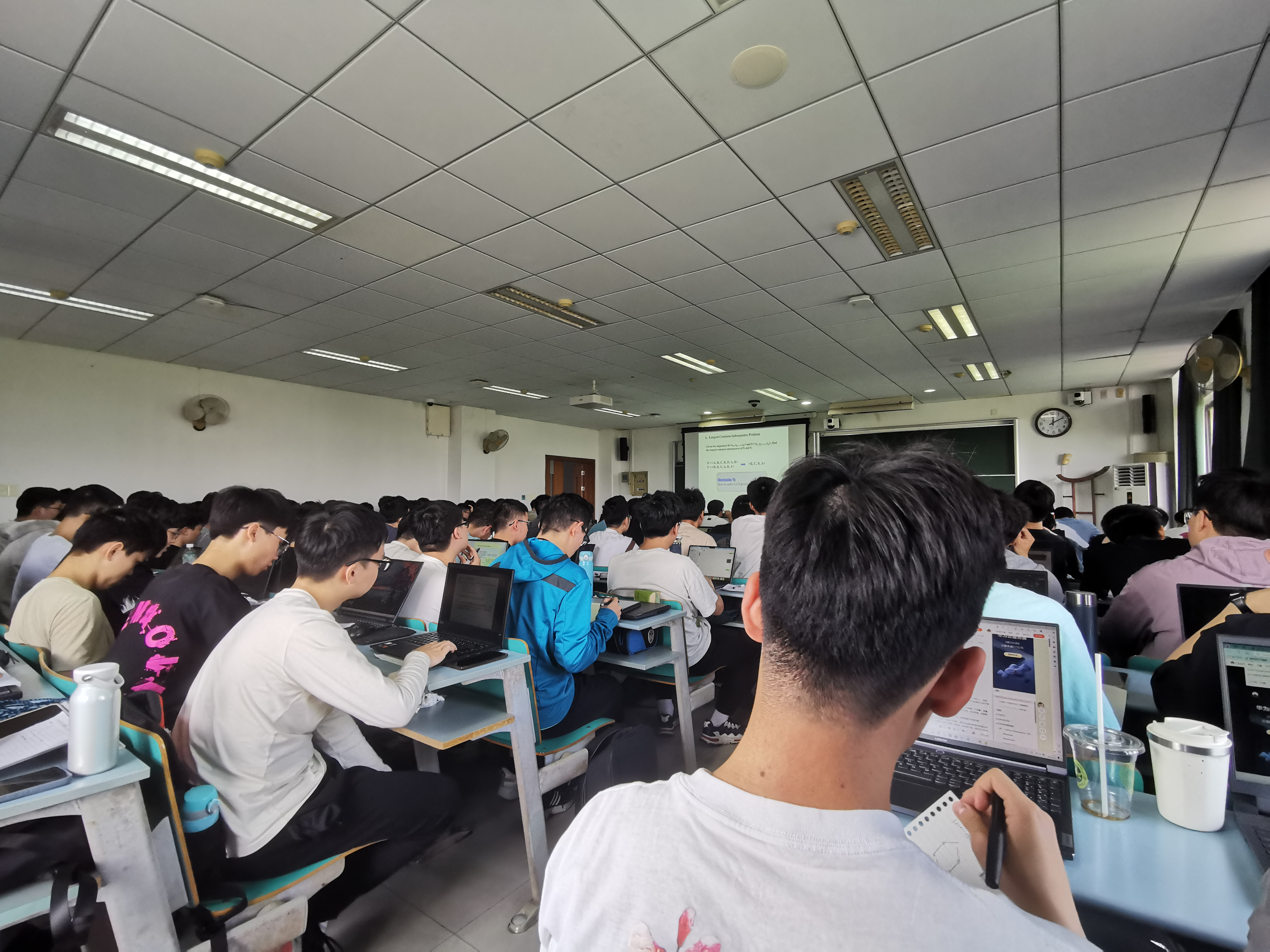
A lecture on data structures in a classroom in Zhejiang University

In 1998 the Chinese government proposed to expand the university enrollment of professional and specialized graduates and to develop world-class universities.

In the spring of 2007, China planned to conduct a national evaluation of its universities. The results of this evaluation are used to support the next major planned policy initiative. The last substantial national evaluation of universities, which was undertaken in 1994, resulted in the 'massification' of higher education as well as a renewed emphasis on elite institutions. Academics praised the fin du siècle reforms for budging China's higher education from a unified, centralized, closed and static system into one characterized by more diversification, decentralization, openness, and dynamism, stimulating the involvement of local governments and other non-state sectors. At the same time, they note that this decentralization and marketization has led to further inequality in educational opportunity.

Chinese policies on College Entrance Examination have been influenced by the recruitment systems of western countries and the traditional culture of imperial examinations. Since Fudan University and Shanghai Jiao Tong University started independent enrollment before College Entrance Examination in 2007, some of the top Chinese colleges began to follow them using a new method to choose students besides a unified examination system. In accordance with university regulations, those colleges appoint their own staff and are responsible for selecting students. Students can get admitted by taking a specific exam or interview before the College Entrance Examination. In this way, students have more chances to get admitted by the top colleges. In 2010, there were several critical reforms in the education field. On 31 January, the education ministry in Guangdong province began to implement parallel voluntary admission in the college entrance recruiting system, which is an efficient way to decrease the risk of getting into a college for the majority of students. On 20 November, the education ministry of China canceled the additional Olympics points in the College Entrance Exam policy. It is fairer for the high school students, and efficiently reduces the heavy academic burdens for students. As the economic development of China, the private school system has been gradually built up. Many private preschools began to use bilingual teaching. Furthermore, some public colleges and universities cooperated with investors to run secondary college by using public running and being sponsored by private enterprises, which promotes the development of education. On the other hand, the Technical and Vocational Education in China has developed rapidly, and become the focus of the whole society.

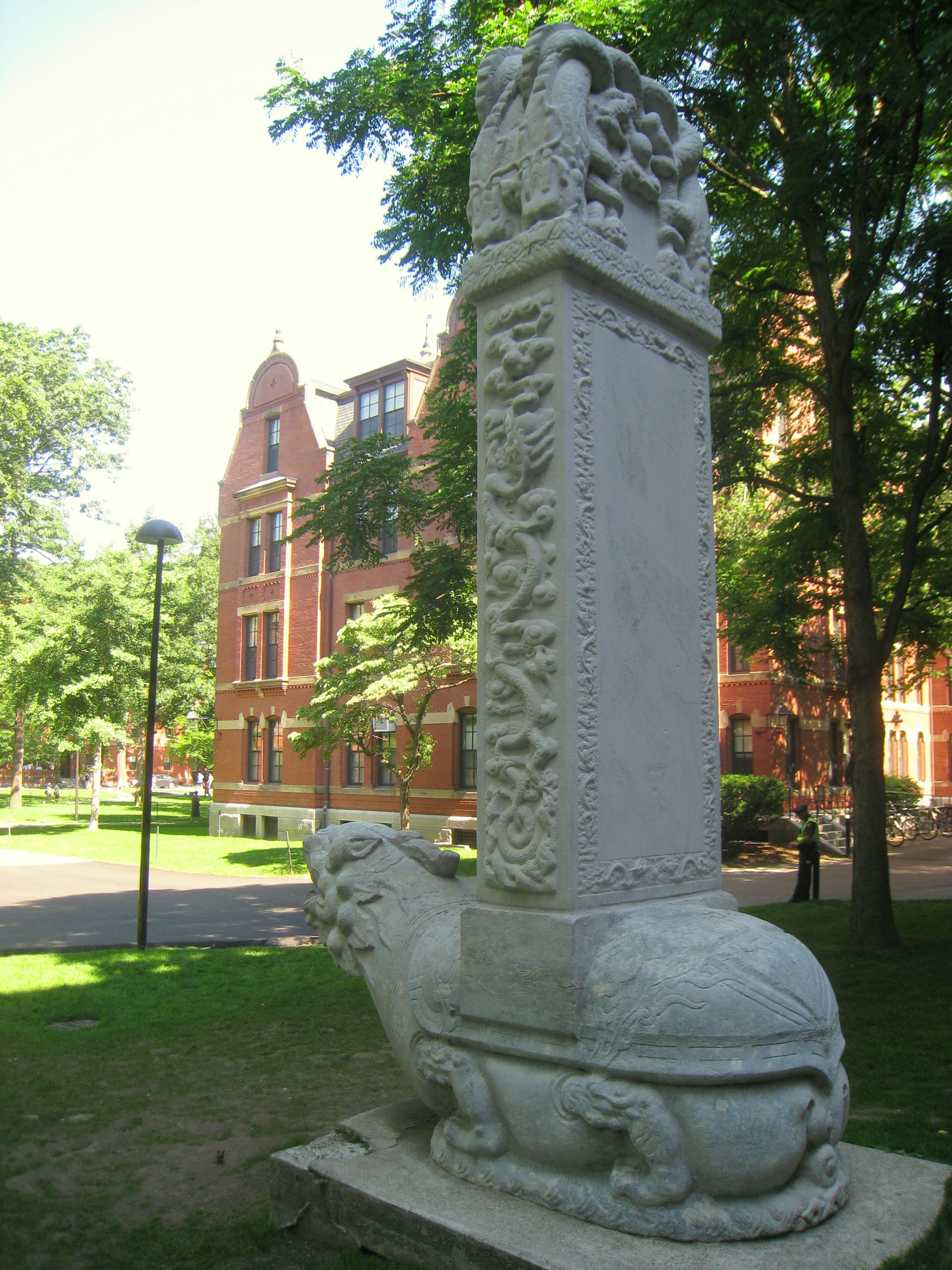
Harvard degrees have long been respected in China. This monument was presented to Harvard University by its Chinese graduates in 1936.

Nowadays, as the educational level of Chinese has increased, getting into college is no longer a remarkable achievement among the Chinese students. Instead, having a degree of an ordinary Chinese university already cannot satisfy the increasingly competitive society. Chinese parents and students have begun to place a high value on overseas education, especially at top American and European institutions such as Harvard University, Oxford University, and Cambridge University, which are "revered" among many middle-class parents. Since 1999, the number of Chinese applicants to top schools overseas has increased tenfold. Much of the interest in overseas schools has been attributed to the release of how-to parenting books such as Harvard Girl, which spawned a "national obsession" with admissions to overseas schools. After 2005, the number of overseas students from China not only showed a growth trend, but also presented a lowering trend of age.

With more students going abroad for university, increasing numbers of affluent families are "opting out" of the conventional public school system, which is heavily oriented towards preparing for the Chinese college admissions test. These families, who can afford tuition at a foreign university and may prefer a more "western" education for their children, are sending their children to private schools, special programs within Chinese public schools, or schools abroad. Some of the prestige of American higher education is the result of weaknesses in the PRC's education system, which stifles creativity in favor of rote memorization.

As a result of the growing mismatch between university degrees and job opportunities in China, university students are also increasingly undertaking extracurricular educational training during their time in university. These include university clubs, volunteering activities, and internships. Furthermore, the Chinese state has promoted entrepreneurship among university students by running business training, setting up "business incubators" on campuses, and offering special benefits for student entrepreneurs. As a result of this development, university life in China has become associated with various aspects of "self-development" in addition to formal classroom learning.

During Xi Jinping's tenure, numerous colleges and universities have established schools of Marxism. In 2012, there were about a hundred such schools nationwide; as of 2021, there were more than 1,440. Master's degree and Doctoral programs in Marxism have increased significantly since 2016.

Beginning in 2017, Chinese universities and regional governments have begun establishing centers for the study of Xi Jinping Thought on ecological civilization. At least 18 such centers had been established as of 2021.

In 2024, the textbook An Introduction to the Community of the Zhonghua Race (中华民族共同体概论) was rolled out and made compulsory for all university students in the country. Edited by Pan Yue, director of the National Ethnic Affairs Commission, the textbook advocates for further integration of the country's ethnic minorities and criticizes prior policies of "ethnic minority exceptionalism."

=== Overseas students ===
The number of foreigners wanting to study in China has been rising by approximately 20% annually since the reform and opening period began. China has been the most popular country in Asia for international students, and as of 2018, it was the second most popular education powerhouse in the world after the United States.

According to reports, South Korea, Japan, the United States, Vietnam, and Thailand were the five biggest source countries, and the number of students from European source countries is increasing. Currently the Chinese government offers over 10,000 scholarships to foreign students, though this is set to rise by approximately 3,000 within the next year.

International students are increasingly studying in China. China's economy is improving more quickly than had been predicted, i.e. sizable economic growth by 2015 has been predicted as opposed to 2050. China has already drawn the attention of the West for its growth rates, and the 2008 Olympic Games and Shanghai Expo 2010 have intensified this positive attention. Another factor that draws students to China is the considerably lower cost of living in China compared to most western countries. Finally, major cities in China such as Beijing and Shanghai already have a strong international presence. Nevertheless, unlike in many Western countries, possibilities to legally engage in internships and part-time work are limited and remain within a grey area although national legislation has tried to clarify the matter.

=== Rankings and reputation ===
Currently, China has around 3,012 colleges and universities. The quality of universities and higher education in China is internationally recognized as the country has the world's highest number of universities in several rankings, including the Academic Ranking of World Universities (ARWU), the U.S. News & World Report Best Global University Ranking, the University Ranking by Academic Performance, the CWTS Leiden Ranking, and the SCImago Institutions Rankings.

As of 2026, China topped the list for the Academic Ranking of World Universities (ARWU) and the U.S. News & World Report Best Global Universities Ranking, two of the fourth most observed global university rankings apart from the QS and THE.

China has dominated the QS BRICS University Rankings and the THE's Emerging Economies University Rankings, claiming seven of the top 10 spots for both rankings. China is also the most-represented nation overall. In 2020, China tops the QS Asia University Rankings list with over 120 universities including in the ranking, and five Chinese universities appear in the Asia Top 10, which is more than any country. As of 2025, there were 2 Chinese universities in the global top 20, 5 in the top 50, and 19 in the top 200, behind only the United States and the United Kingdom in terms of the overall representation in the Aggregate Ranking of Top Universities, a composite ranking system combining three of the world's most influential university rankings (ARWU+QS+ THE).

According to THE China Subject Ratings 2020 conducted by the Time Higher Education World University Rankings, Chinese universities are on a par with their counterparts in the US, the UK, and Germany across 89 subjects ahead of others like France, South Korea, and Russia. The country scores above the global average of B score, with 46 percent of its universities' grades were A+, A, or A−, only slightly behind the US (49 percent). The QS ranking by subjects 2021indicated that universities in China now have a record number in the top 50 universities in the world across all 51 subjects in five broad discipline areas: "Arts and Humanities", "Natural Sciences", "Social Sciences and Management", "Engineering & Technology", and "Life Sciences and Medicines".

This reflects the continual development of Chinese higher education and research quality of universities over time. Regardless of different rankings about universities in China, the Ministry of Education of China does not advocate or recognize any ranking conducted by a third party.

Leading universities in the C9 League such as Peking University, Tsinghua University, Fudan University, Zhejiang University, and Shanghai Jiao Tong University have already gained international reputation for outstanding teaching and research facilities. China has signed agreements with almost 54 countries such as Germany, Great Britain, the United States, Australia, Canada and Russia on mutual recognition of higher education qualifications and academic degrees. Many Chinese universities such as United International College now offer degrees in English enabling students with no knowledge of the Chinese language to study there.

== Adult education ==
Because only 4 percent of the nation's secondary education graduates are admitted to universities, China has found it necessary to develop other ways of meeting the demand for education. Adult education has become increasingly important in helping China meet its modernization goals. Adult, or "nonformal", education is an alternative form of higher education that encompasses radio, television, and correspondence universities, spare-time and part-time universities, factory-run universities for staff and workers, and county-run universities for peasants, many operating primarily during students' off-work hours. These alternative forms of education are economical. They had sought to educate both the "delayed generation" – those who lost educational opportunities during the Cultural Revolution (1966–1976) – and to raise the cultural, scientific, and general education levels of workers on the job. The primary purpose of adult education is to provide a second chance for those who are poor in society or who have lost access to education for other reasons in order to achieve social justice and equal access to education. In the 1960s, the idea of "lifelong education" was raised, and began the transition of Chinese education. Adult education begins focusing on the cultivation of social responsibility to develop lifelong education theory.

=== History of adult education ===
In 1949, the common program formulated by the first session of the Chinese people's political consultative conference (CPPCC) clearly confirmed that China needed to put emphasis on the education of the working class. It addressed the serious situation of illiteracy, which was then more than 80 percent of the population. The period from 1949 to 1966 marked the beginning and development of adult education in new China. From 1966 to 1976, adult education could not be carried out normally due to the impact of the ten-year "cultural revolution". Since 1978, when China entered the new era of modernization, adult education has been rapidly restored and developed.

=== Forms ===
Schools have been established by government departments, businesses, trade unions, academic societies, democratic parties, and other organizations. In 1984 about 70 percent of China's factories and enterprises supported their own part-time classes, which often were referred to as workers' colleges. In Beijing alone, more than ninety adult-education schools with night schools enrolled tens of thousands of students. More than 20,000 of these students graduated annually from evening universities, workers' colleges, television universities, and correspondence schools – more than twice the number graduating from regular colleges and universities. The government spent 200 yuan (¥) to ¥500 per adult education student and at least ¥1,000 per regular university student. In 1984 approximately 1.3 million students enrolled in television, correspondence, and evening universities, about a 30 percent increase over 1983.

Spare-time education for workers and peasants and literacy classes for the entire adult population were other components of basic education. Spare-time education included a very broad range of educational activities at all levels. Most spare-time schools were sponsored by factories and run for their own workers; they provided fairly elementary education, as well as courses to upgrade technical skills. Most were on-the-job training and retraining courses, a normal part of any industrial system. These schools continually received publicity in the domestic media as a symbol of social justice, but it was unclear whether they received adequate resources to achieve this end.

China's educational television system began in 1960 but was suspended during the Cultural Revolution in 1966. In 1979 the Central Radio and Television University was established in Beijing with branches in twenty-eight provincial-level universities. Many Central Radio and Television University students were recent senior-middle school graduates who scored just below the cut-off point for admission to conventional colleges and universities. Full-time (who take four courses) and part-time students (two courses) had at least two years' work experience, and they return to their jobs after graduation. Spare-time students (one course) studied after work. Students whose work units granted them permission to study in a television university were paid their normal wages; expenses for most of their books and other educational materials were paid for by the state. A typical Central Radio and Television University student spent up to six hours a day over a three-year period watching lectures on videotapes produced by some of the best teachers in China. These lectures were augmented by face-to-face tutoring by local instructors and approximately four hours of homework each evening. The major problem with the system is that there were too few television sets. In 1987 the Central Television and Radio University had its programs produced, transmitted, and financed by the State Administration of Radio, Film, and Television. The State Education Commission developed its curriculum and distributed its printed support materials. The curriculum included both basic, general-purpose courses in science and technology and more specialized courses. The Central Television and Radio University offered more than 1,000 classes in Beijing and its suburbs and 14 majors in 2- to 3-year courses through 56 working centers. Students who passed final examinations were given certificates entitling them to the same level of remuneration as graduates of regular, full-time colleges and universities. The state gave certain allowances to students awaiting jobs during their training period.

=== Literacy and language reform ===
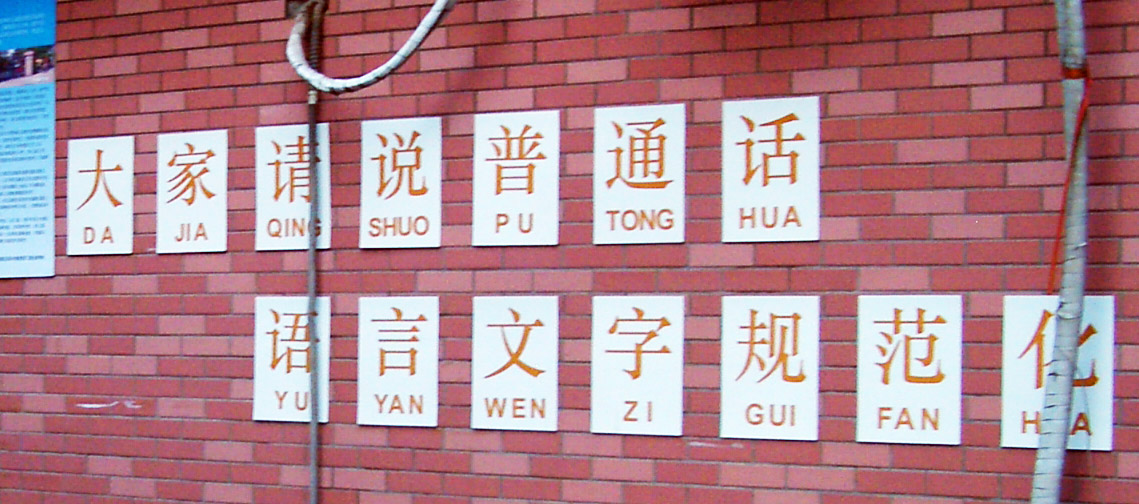
The Hanyu Pinyin Romanization is commonly used as a means of teaching literacy and the standard ("Putonghua") pronunciation.

The continuing campaigns to eradicate illiteracy also were a part of basic education. Chinese government statistics indicated that of a total population of nearly 1.1 billion in 1985, about 230 million people were illiterate or semiliterate. The difficulty of mastering written Chinese makes raising the literacy rate particularly difficult. In general, language reform was intended to make writing and the standard language easier to learn, which in turn would foster both literacy and linguistic unity and serve as a foundation for a simpler written language. In 1951 the party issued a directive that inaugurated a three-part plan for language reform. The plan sought to establish universal comprehension of a standardized common language, simplify written characters, and introduce, where possible, romanized forms based on the Latin alphabet. In 1956 Putonghua (Modern Standard Chinese) was introduced as the language of instruction in schools and in the national broadcast media, and by 1977 it was in use throughout China, particularly in the government and party, and in education. Although in 1987 the government continued to endorse the goal of universalizing Putonghua, hundreds of regional and local dialects continued to be spoken, complicating interregional communication.

A second language reform required the simplification of ideographs because ideographs with fewer strokes are easier to learn. In 1964 the Committee for Reforming the Chinese Written Language released an official list of 2,238 simplified characters most basic to the language. Simplification made literacy easier, although some people taught only in simplified characters were cut off from the wealth of Chinese literature written in traditional characters. Any idea of replacing the ideographic script with the romanized script was soon abandoned by government and education leaders.

The third area of change involved the proposal to use the pinyin romanization system more widely. Pinyin (first approved by the National People's Congress in 1958) was encouraged primarily to facilitate the spread of Putonghua in regions where other dialects and languages are spoken. By the mid-1980s, the use of pinyin was not as widespread as the use of Putonghua.

Literacy campaigns and the differences in funding actually increased the differences in literacy rates in the city and the countryside. Retaining literacy was as much a problem as acquiring it, particularly among the rural population. Literacy rates declined between 1966 and 1976. The political disorder may have contributed to the decline, but the basic problem was that the many Chinese ideographs can be mastered only through rote learning and can be often forgotten because of disuse.

=== Types ===
With the development of the education system in China, the government gradually began to pay attention to adult education, instituting three types of adult education: Adult college entrance examinations, higher education self-taught examinations, and open education and network education (distance education).

There is only one college entrance exam every year, typically in the middle of October. Adult college entrance classes are usually held on weeknights or weekends.

Adult self-taught exams are open to all adults and does not require a certificate of formal schooling to participate. The only requirement is possession of a valid ID card. Candidates can take the exam by studying various subjects on their own or enroll in courses which are organized by universities or junior colleges.

Compared with traditional academic education, open education is a new teaching model that combines traditional face-to-face teaching, textbook autonomous learning, and online real-time courses and online classes.

Network education is taught through a network course. The study style is convenient, suits adults with busy jobs and do not have a fixed time to attend a class. Enrollment time is relatively loose, divided into spring and autumn admission. The examination time is also quite open, every month having an entrance examination.

== Online education ==
The participation of investors in online education has made it a noteworthy investment avenue in the education industry. Students of remote and under-developed areas are beneficiaries of online education, but online universities offer students who failed university entrance examinations and working people the chance of lifelong education and learning.

The Ministry of Education has approved 68 ordinary schools of higher learning and the Central Radio and TV University to pilot modern distance education. By the end of 2003, these schools had established 2,027 off-campus learning centers around China, offering 140 majors in ten disciplines, and had a total enrollment of 1.373 million.

The gradual spread of broadband technology has also helped online education. The China Education and Research Network (CERNET), started in 1994, is now China's second largest Internet network, covering all major cities of China. The high-speed connection between it and the China Education Broadband Satellite Net opened in 2000, established a "space to earth" transmission platform for modern distance education, and provided an all-round network supporting environment for distance education.

== Information and communications technology (ICT) ==
In 2010, the Government of China released its medium and long term national ICT in education master plans, which stated explicitly that ICT would have a historic impact on the development of education and called for a strong emphasis on ICT in education. In order to realize the scientific and orderly development of ICT in education, China has developed a holistic and top-down approach. The Ten Year Development Plan for ICT in Education 2011–2020 was formalized in 2012. It states that by 2020, all adults will have access to quality education resources in an ICT-enabling environment, an ICT support service system for the learning society will take shape, and all regions and schools at all levels will have broadband internet access.

In order to considerably enhance Internet coverage and transmission capacity, China has accelerated its drive to upgrade infrastructure, including the China Education and Research Network (CERNet) and China Education Broadband Satellite (CEBSat), which are the two main education networks.

To enhance the impact of ICT in education and teaching, China has placed a strong focus on developing quality digital educational resources. In particular, China has launched the "one teacher, one quality lesson, and one class one quality teacher" initiative, which has led to the creation of quality digital teaching resources for 3.26 million teachers. In tandem, the Chinese Government has encouraged higher education institutions to develop MOOCs, and private companies to develop basic digital resources to supplement formal educational materials.

To enhance the modernization of education governance, China has promoted ICT in education administration through the establishment of a national data center and the implementation of the national service system for education decision-making. China has also set up a national data center supporting the administration through a unique online identity number for each student, each teacher, and each school.

In an effort to promote the widespread application of ICT in teaching, China has carried out full-scale capacity training for teachers. China has launched a capacity improvement project targeting primary and secondary school teachers' capacity to use ICT, helping them to integrate ICT into their teaching. ICT training for education administrators has also been stepped up, so as to enhance their ICT leadership capability.

== Teachers ==
In 1985, the government designated 10 September as Teachers' Day, the first festival day for any profession, and indicative of government efforts to raise the social status and living standards of teachers.

The government has started the Nationwide Program of Network for Education of Teachers to improve the quality of teaching on September 8 2003. It aims to modernize teachers' education through educational information, providing support and services for lifelong learning through the teachers' education network, TV satellite network, and the Internet to greatly improve the teaching quality of elementary and high school faculties.

As required by state law, local governments are implementing teacher qualification systems and promoting in-service training for large numbers of school principals, so as to further improve school management standards. Currently, in schools of higher learning, professors and assistant professors account for 9.5 percent and 30 percent respectively. Young and middle-aged teachers predominate; teachers under age 45 account for 79 percent of total faculty, and under age 35 for 46 percent. Teachers in higher education constitute a vital contingent in scientific research, knowledge innovation, and sci-tech. Of all academicians in the Chinese Academy of Sciences, 40.7 percent (280) are in the higher education sector; for the Chinese Academy of Engineering the corresponding figure is 35.3 percent (234).

Among the most pressing problems facing education reformers was the scarcity of qualified teachers, which has led to serious stunting of educational development. In 1986 there were about 8 million primary- and middle-school teachers in China, but many lacked professional training. Estimates indicated that in order to meet the goals of the Seventh Five-Year Plan and realize compulsory 9-year education, the system needed 1 million new teachers for primary schools, 750,000 new teachers for junior middle schools, and 300,000 new teachers for senior middle schools.

To cope with the shortage of qualified teachers, the State Education Commission decreed in 1985 that senior-middle-school teachers should be graduates with two years' training in professional institutes and that primary-school teachers should be graduates of secondary schools. To improve teacher quality, the commission established full-time and part-time (the latter preferred because it was less costly) in-service training programs. Primary-school and preschool in-service teacher training programs devoted 84 percent of the time to subject teaching, 6 percent to pedagogy, and psychology, and 10 percent to teaching methods. In-service training for primary-school teachers was designed to raise them to a level of approximately two years' postsecondary study, with the goal of qualifying most primary-school teachers by 1990. Secondary-school in-service teacher training was based on a unified model, tailored to meet local conditions, and offered on a spare-time basis. Ninety-five percent of its curricula were devoted to subject teaching, 2 to 3 percent to pedagogy and psychology, and 2 to 3 percent to teaching methods. There was no similar large-scale in-service effort for technical and vocational teachers, most of whom worked for enterprises and local authorities.

By 1985 there were more than 1,000 teacher training schools – an indispensable tool in the effort to solve the acute shortage of qualified teachers. These schools, however, were unable to supply the number of teachers needed to attain modernization goals through 1990. Although a considerable number of students graduated as qualified teachers from institutions of Higher Learning, the relatively low social status and salary levels of teachers hampered recruitment, and not all of the graduates of teachers' colleges became teachers. To attract more teachers, China tried to make teaching a more desirable and respected profession. To this end, the government designated 10 September as Teachers' Day, granted teachers pay raises, and made teachers' colleges tuition free. To further arrest the teacher shortage, in 1986 the central government sent teachers to underdeveloped regions to train local schoolteachers.

Because urban teachers continued to earn more than their rural counterparts and because academic standards in the countryside had dropped, it remained difficult to recruit teachers for rural areas. Teachers in rural areas also had production responsibilities for their plots of land, which took time from their teaching. Rural primary teachers needed to supplement their pay by farming because most were paid by the relatively poor local communities rather than by the state.

== School uniforms ==
Many schools in China require the use of a school uniform until college. Students have uniforms for both sportswear and their daily uniform, both of which will change depending on the season. Uniforms can also differ in design depending on the school, making it easy for people to identify which school a student attends. Proponents of school uniforms argue that the uniforms are a unique form of culture, remove the pressure of students comparing clothing, and allow the faculty and others to identify students and their respective schools. In an article for China Daily, Yuan Can stated that while student uniforms were previously regarded as a sign of progress, in current society the uniform's style is seen instead as a sign of identity and belonging.

== Problems ==
The intensity of competition in education is a source of national angst. Although cities like Shanghai regularly perform highly in international assessments, Chinese education has both native and international detractors; common areas of criticism include its intense rigor; its emphasis on memorization and standardized testing, which can discourage innovation and independent thinking; and the gap in quality of education between regions and genders.

=== Stress on memorization and rigour ===
In 2014, Jonathan Kaiman of The Guardian wrote that Chinese parents and educators "see their own system as corrupt, dehumanizing, pressurized and unfair"; he went on to discuss the country's college admission exam (called the gaokao), writing that "many parents consider the grueling nine-hour test a sorting mechanism that will determine the trajectory of their children's lives."

=== Academic pressure and student well-being ===
Concerns have been raised regarding the academic workload and school management practices experienced by students in Chinese junior and senior high schools under the examination-oriented education system. Critics have argued that intense academic competition and strict school management have resulted in long study hours and inadequate time for rest and other activities, while also placing significant pressure on both students and teachers, particularly in schools where academic performance and examination results are heavily emphasized. Reports have also documented students’ experiences of loneliness, surveillance, psychological strain, and other mental health problems associated with intense academic competition and restrictive school routines. Researchers have suggested that prolonged academic pressure within the examination-oriented education system can negatively affect adolescents’ physical and mental well-being. Supporting these concerns, a 2017 comparative survey of high school students in China, Japan, South Korea, and the United States found that 54.6% of Chinese respondents reported insufficient sleep. The study identified heavy academic workloads and examination pressure as factors associated with insufficient sleep and other health concerns among Chinese students.

=== Internet addiction camps ===
Internet addiction camps (Chinese: 戒网瘾学校) are a type of private institution that purports to address so-called "problem students" through closed, militarized management, and touts its ability to manage behavioral and psychological issues, such as internet addiction, early romantic relationships, rebellious behavior, school aversion, and violent tendencies among adolescents. However, such institutions have frequently been exposed for fraud and abuse. In practice, these institutions, operating without government oversight, have been widely reported to employ deceptive recruitment tactics, solitary confinement, torture, corporal punishment, physical and psychological coercion, forced labor, unauthorized electroconvulsive therapy, and other forms of abuse that have resulted in severe injuries and even deaths. Numerous cases have been documented in which students were deceived and sent to such facilities against their will, subjected to physical abuse, and deprived of basic rights such as safety and freedom, raising serious concerns about violations of their fundamental human rights and personal liberty.

=== Regional inequality ===
In 2014, Helen Gao of The New York Times called China's educational system "cutthroat" and wrote that its positive reputation among admirers is largely built on a myth:

While China has phenomenally expanded basic education for its people, quadrupling its output of college graduates in the past decade, it has also created a system that discriminates against its less wealthy and well-connected citizens, thwarting social mobility at every step with bureaucratic and financial barriers. A huge gap in educational opportunities between students from rural areas and those from cities is one of the main culprits. Some 60 million students in rural schools are 'left-behind' children, cared for by their grandparents as their parents seek work in faraway cities. While many of their urban peers attend schools equipped with state-of-the-art facilities and well-trained teachers, rural students often huddle in decrepit school buildings and struggle to grasp advanced subjects such as English and chemistry amid a dearth of qualified instructors. "Rural students stand virtually no chance when competing academically with their urban counterparts," Jiang Nengjie, a friend and independent filmmaker who made a documentary on the left-behind children, told me.

In 2014, Lara Farrar argued in The Chronicle of Higher Education that the disabled are "shortchanged" in Chinese schools, with very little chance of acceptance into higher educational institutions.

Reflecting the fact that most of China's population lives in the countryside, 95.2 percent of all elementary schools, 87.6 percent of junior high schools and 71.5 percent of senior high schools are in rural areas, with 160 million students at the compulsory education stage. The 1995–2000 "National Project of Compulsory Education in Impoverished Areas" involved the allocation of 3.9 billion special funds from the central finance and 10 billion yuan raised by local governments to improve schooling conditions in impoverished areas. In 2004, various special funds allocated by the central finance for compulsory education in rural areas reached 10 billion yuan, a 72.4 percent increase on the 2003 figure of 5.8 billion.

The China Agricultural Broadcast and Television School has nearly 3,000 branch schools and a teaching and administrative staff of 46,000. Using radio, television, satellite, network, audio, and video materials, it has trained over 100 million people in applicable agricultural technologies and over 8 million persons for work in rural areas. After 20 years in development, it is the world's largest distance learning organ for rural education.

In a Ministry of Education program covering the next five years, the government will implement measures to realize its aims of nine-year compulsory education in China's western region and the basic elimination of young and middle-aged illiteracy and the popularization of high level, high quality nine-year compulsory education in the east and central rural areas. At the same time, the government is to promote the development of modern distance learning for rural elementary and high schools and further improve rural compulsory education management systems.

=== Gender inequality ===
Although gender inequality in the context of education has lessened considerably in the last thirty years, the rapid economic growth China experienced during that time created uneven growth across regions of the country. Language barriers among minority populations, as well as drastic differences in regional laws governing school attendance, contribute to the differing levels of gender equality in education. A 2010 statement by UNESCO stated that in China it is "necessary to articulate a strategy to improve girls' and women's participation, retention and achievement in education at all levels," and that education should be "seen as an instrument for the empowerment of women."

=== Food safety ===
In China there have been many food safety problems in schools.

In 2019 a secondary school in Chengdu, Sichuan, many parents discovered problems relating to how their children eat at school. Some parents reported that they saw "smelly pork" and mouldy bread. Thereafter some demonstrations happened and 12 people were arrested by Chengdu Police.

September 2025, Lufeng, Guangdong, a primary school reported that many students had stomachache.

From 2020 to March 2021, the defendant Luo purchased duck breast rolls at a price of 20 yuan/kg for illegal profit (非法牟利). He then used the duck breast rolls to impersonate beef rolls and sold them to catering establishments such as a university restaurant at prices ranging from 32 yuan/kg to 44 yuan/kg. This case let the defendant to face 7 years imprisonment and fine for 100 thousand yuan.

Others cases e.g. Hou's (侯) case of producing and selling food that does not meet safety standards; Shi's (施) corruption case.

=== Academic censorship ===
Academic publications and speeches in China are subjected to the censorship of Chinese authorities.

==== Textbook examination, approval, and censorship ====
Education is a significant part of the Chinese political system and is tightly controlled by the central government. China's ruling party – the Chinese Communist Party (CCP) – tightly controls teaching materials throughout the country. All curricula and textbooks are examined and approved to prevent students from the influence of foreign ideologies.

In December 2019, the Ministry of Education of China published a guideline that outlines the policies for textbook writing, examination, and censorship in primary and secondary education. According to the guidelines, textbooks are administered at three levels:

- The State Level: Textbooks for national curricula are written by the State Council, and the state also examines, approves, and censors the local-level textbooks.
- The Local Level (provinces, cities, and counties): The party committees at local levels control the local-level textbook writing and examination and monitor the schools’ execution of the education policies.
- The school level: The schools are supposed to develop unique school curricula while implementing the policies, and if schools need to publish any textbook, they need to send the textbook to the party committees for censorship.

Under this hierarchical administrative system, the teaching materials must align with the directives of the Chinese Communist Party. The guidelines state that for subjects with content aligned with or reflected political ideologies, such as history and politics, the state will create standardized textbooks and curricula for use nationwide. Additionally, textbooks published locally that contain those content must be examined and approved by the propaganda department of the local-level party committee, ensuring adherence to national values and principles as defined by the Chinese Communist Party.

The party also exercises oversight over higher education, particularly within universities. In 2015, under Xi Jinping’s ideological campaign, the Minister of Education Yuan Guiren proposed the strict censorship of imported foreign textbooks in universities to make sure they align with socialist values and are not “spreading Western values.” Universities are required to prevent any circumstances that could disseminate negative perceptions of the government and the Party. Additionally, they are obligated to emphasize the propaganda of the Party's principles and socialism and hold mandatory courses in Marxism.

There are voices in China that criticize the state's intervention in academic freedom. Some question the effectiveness of academic censorship, stating that there are still students studying abroad and the government can't ban information from everyone.

Positive opinions also exist regarding textbook policies. Professor Duan Zhaobing from the College of Educational Science at Anhui Normal University suggests that textbooks for primary and secondary education “have the mission of cultivating new people of the times who will be responsible for the rejuvenation of the Chinese nation.” According to Duan, the examination and approval system enables the CCP to guide this process effectively. Duan also suggests that textbooks for primary and secondary education be reformed to cater to students from various regions and backgrounds. The local governments are obligated to offer more affordable “black and white” versions of textbooks for students in disadvantaged areas, alleviating the financial strain on their families.

=== Discrimination ===
Although all people are entitled to nine years of compulsory education in China, there are reports showing that minorities including people with disabilities are discriminated against in basic education. An example of such discrimination that is reflected in the 2013 Human Rights Watch report is of children with attention-deficit/hyperactivity disorder (ADHD) and intellectual disability who were denied enrollment in nearby schools due to their disabilities. Their parents then had to travel long distances from home to find a place for their disabled children for basic education.

There are also policies for geographical allocation of available sits in higher education system which led to regional discrimination in the Higher Education Entrance Examination. In China every person has a place of origin in connection to his/her birthplace, and moving or resettlement to provinces/zones other than the ones of origin are subject to receive permits from the authorities. The students subject to regional discrimination are those who managed to have a better record in the relevant exams but are denied studying at top universities due to their place of origin.

== English education ==
China's first contact with the English language occurred between the Chinese and English traders, and the first missionary schools to teach English were established in Macau in the 1630s. The state emphasis of English education emerged after 1979 when the Cultural Revolution ended, China adopted the Open Door Policy, and the United States and China established strong diplomatic ties. An estimate of the number of English speakers in China is over 200 million and rising, with 50 million secondary school children now studying the language.

In China, most school children are taught their first English lesson at the age of 10. Despite the early learning of English, there is widespread criticism of the teaching and learning of the language. Schools in China are evaluated and financed based on test results. This causes teaching to be geared towards the skills tested. Students focus on rote-memorization (written and oral repetition) as the main learning strategy. These methods, which fit very well with the Chinese way of learning, have been criticized as fundamentally flawed by Western educationalists and linguists. Furthermore, newly learned words are seldom put into use. This arises because everyone in China communicates through Mandarin or a regional Chinese dialect, and English is perceived to be of little use in the country. This has been further reinforced through the national Band 4 examination where 80% of the test is the writing component, 20% is devoted to listening, and speaking is excluded entirely. According to a national survey, only half of the teachers consider that vocabulary should be learned through conversation or communication. A far smaller percentage support activities such as role-playing or vocabulary games.

According to research completed by The Telegraph in 2017, less than 1 percent of people in China speak English conversationally.

== Education for migrant children ==
Following the large-scale movement of the Chinese rural population to the cities the children of these migrant workers either stay as left-behind children in the villages or they migrate with their parents to the cities. Although regulations by the central government stipulate that all migrant children have the right to attend a public school in the cities public schools nevertheless effectively reject these children by setting high thresholds such as school fees and exams or by requesting an urban registration (Hukou). Providing an alternative, private entrepreneurs established since the 1990s semi-official private schools that offered schooling to migrant children for lower fees. This system contributed to the segregation between urban and migrant children. Furthermore, these schools often have a poor teaching quality, provide only school certificates of limited value and sometimes even do not comply with safety regulations. Since the beginning of the 2000s, some local governments thus started campaigns to close these private schools but nevertheless, in many cities, these schools still exist. Although Chinese scholars have conducted case-study research on migrant children and their schools there is a lack in studies with a nationwide scope.

Studies among left-behind children in China found that they had lower self-esteem and more mental health problems than children overall. Teachers of left-behind children often lack the resources, understanding, or opportunity to communicate to family or guardians the need for them to provide support and attention. Analysis for the 2019 Global Education Monitoring Report found that children with absent mothers had lower grades in mathematics, Chinese, and English. Children with one or both parents absent had more symptoms of depression than those with present parents. Analysis from rural Gansu province (2000 and 2015) found that children with absent fathers had 0.4 fewer years of education.

== See also ==
- Career and Life Planning Education
- China Open Resources for Education (CORE)
- Chinese university ranking
- Culture of China
- Digital divide in China
- Higher education in China
- History of science and technology in China
- Imperial examination
- International Research And Training Centre For Rural Education (INRULED)
- List of universities in China
- National College Entrance Examination
- OpenCourseWare in China
- Patriotic Education Campaign
- Private and public schools in China
- Scouting and Guiding in Mainland China
- Two Million Minutes (documentary film)
- Education in China by province
- Bohunt Chinese School
- Class of 1977 (China)
- People's Education Press
- Morrison Education Society School
