= Jiangsu Donghai Senior High School =

High school in Lianyungang, Jiangsu, China

Jiangsu Donghai Senior High School (Chinese: 江苏省东海高级中学) is a high school in Lianyungang in China's Jiangsu province. Founded in 1953, the school became a Jiangsu provincial key high school in 1980. It received a four-star high school designation, the highest accreditation in the province, on 21 July 2004 from the Jiangsu Provincial Department of Education after completing an assessment. The school is a national exemplar senior high school.

The school teaches students in a five-level building that occupies 5,240 square metres (56,400 sq ft).
