= Yuwen (education) =

Chinese educational subject

Yuwen (Chinese: 语文, Pinyin: Yǔwén), literally meaning Chinese Language and Literature, is a subject in China's education.

== Etymology ==
"Yuwen" consists of two characters:

- Yǔ (语): Short for Yǔyán (语言), meaning spoken language.
- Wén (文): Short for Wénzì (文字) and Wénxué (文学), meaning written characters, literature, and culture.

The term "Yuwen" was popularized in the 1940s and 50s by Ye Shengtao. Before this, the subject was often called "Guowen" (国文, National Literature). Ye Shengtao's goal was to emphasize that students should master both everyday spoken communication and formal written expression.

== What students study ==
Yuwen is incredibly comprehensive. It is far more than just learning how to read and write Mandarin Chinese; it spans several distinct areas as students grow older:

- Pinyin and Literacy (Early Years): Kindergarteners and primary schoolers start with Pinyin (the Romanization system) to master standard pronunciation and learn thousands of Chinese characters.
- Modern Literature & Comprehension: Students read, analyze, and critique modern Chinese prose, poetry, and novels, alongside translated masterpieces of global literature.
- Classical Chinese: Starting in middle school, students spend a massive chunk of time learning how to read ancient Chinese texts. They memorize classical poetry (from dynasties like Tang and Song) and essays written thousands of years ago, which requires learning ancient grammar and vocabulary.
- Composition & Rhetoric (作文, Zuòwén): Writing is a heavy component. Students are trained to write highly structured essays, moving from simple descriptive narratives in primary school to complex argumentative and philosophical essays by high school.
