= Training schools in China =

In China, the term "training school" or "training center" can refer to a private company that helps students, typically from 3–12 years old, improve their performance in academic subjects such as English, math, or Chinese. These schools normally operate in the evenings, on weekends, or both. Many hold classes during school recesses. Training schools can range anywhere from a one-room operation with only one teacher, to very large corporations with hundreds of thousands of students.

One reason for the existence of training schools in China is the "large gap between the demand for and supply of elementary and secondary teachers", which causes an increase in the value of premium teaching.

The purpose of a training school is to help students achieve higher scores on the tests they will face in their public schools. There is a strong distinction in China between a training school and one that will explicitly get students ready for an international school or an overseas education. Training schools focus on memorization and test-taking, while schools geared towards child development emphasize games and activities.

== Notable Examples ==
The more well-known national-level training schools include "EF (English First), Giraffe, Aston, Hess, and Best Learning".
