= Open University of China =

National public university headquartered in Beijing, China

Coordinates: 39.85647°N 116.2823311°E

The Open University of China
- 国家开放大学
- Other name: Seniors University of China (2023–)
- Former names: China Central Radio and TV University (1978–2012)
- Motto: 敬学广惠有教无类
- Motto in English: "Reverence for Learning, Wideness of Benefit, Inclusivity of Education, Absence of Discrimination"
- Type: National public university
- Established: 1978
- Founder: Deng Xiaoping
- Students: 2.7 million
- Location: Haidian, Beijing, China
- Website: ouchn.edu.cn
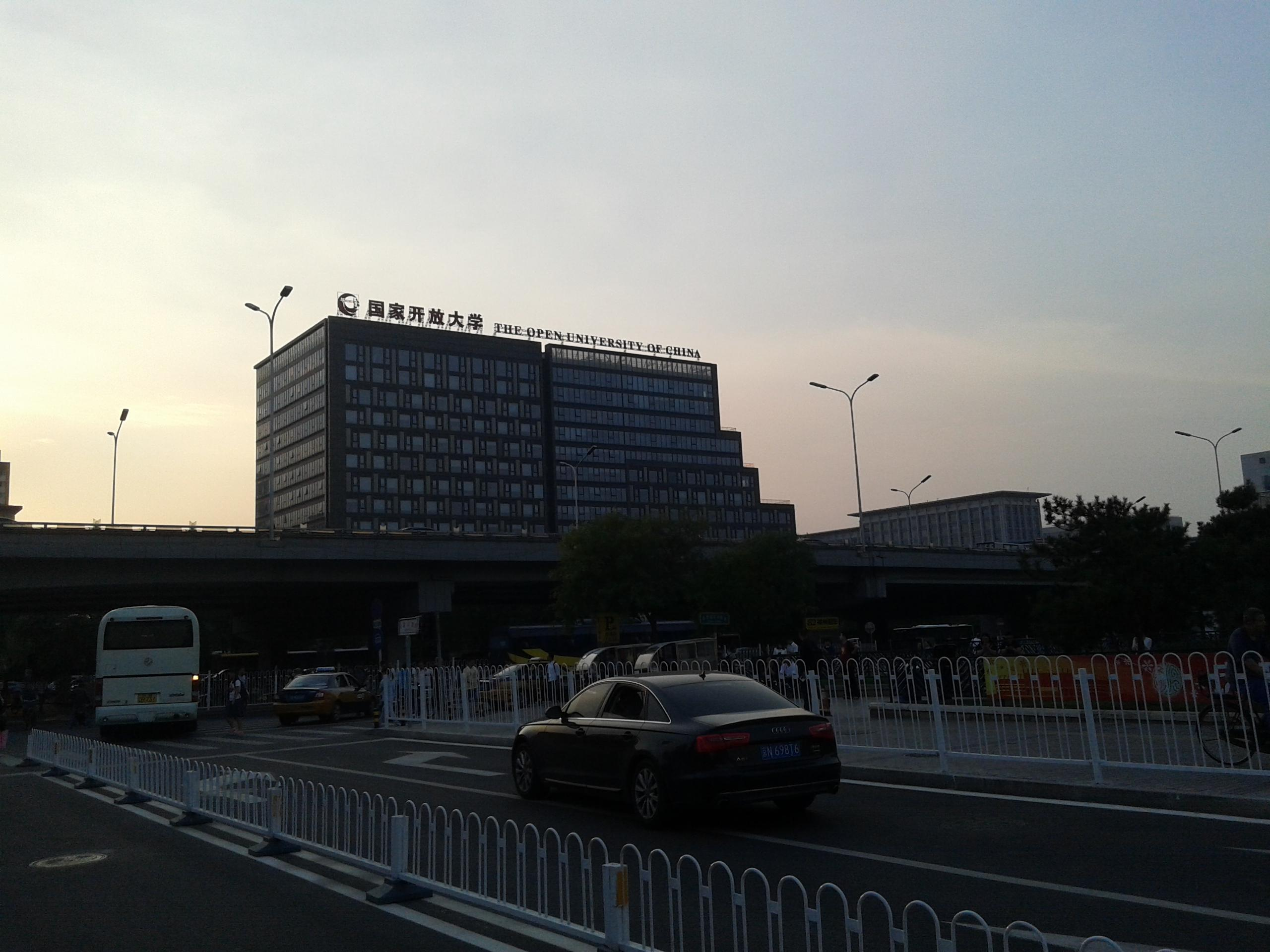

Chinese name
- Simplified Chinese: 国家开放大学
- Traditional Chinese: 國家開放大學
Transcriptions
Standard Mandarin
- Hanyu Pinyin: Guójiā Kāifàng Dàxué

China Central Radio and TV University
- Simplified Chinese: 中央广播电视大学
- Traditional Chinese: 中央廣播電視大學
Transcriptions
Standard Mandarin
- Hanyu Pinyin: Zhōngyāng Guǎngbō Diànshì Dàxué

The Open University of China (国家开放大学) is a national public university headquartered in Beijing, China. Established in 1978 by an executive order of Deng Xiaoping, the university is directly affiliated with and sponsored by the Ministry of Education of China.

The Open University of China features higher education opportunities to adult citizens nationwide through distance learning and face-to-face sessions. As a higher education system, it consists of one headquarters, 45 branches, and 3735 study centers in urban and rural areas across the country.

The university was known as the China Central Radio and TV University (中央广播电视大学) from 1978 to 2012. Currently, most courses are blended between face-to-face sessions and distance learning. The university now has 14 industry schools and 11 specialized colleges. In fall 2022, it offered 10 bachelor's majors, 53 bachelor's (transfer in with an associate's degree) majors, and 75 associate's majors, including science, engineering, agricultural science, pharmacy, nursing, literature, law, economics, management, and education. The university was also named the Seniors University of China by the Ministry of Education in 2023.

The current president is Dr. Ge Daokai, Sun Lüyi, Li Linshu and Yan Bing are vice presidents, and Zhang Hui is party secretary of the university.

== Colleges & schools ==
As of 2023, the university operates 14 industry schools (行业学院), 11 specialized colleges (专门学院), and 8 internal research institutes.

=== Professional Schools ===
- School of Mechanical Engineering (机械工业学院)
- School of Automotive Training (汽车学院)
- School of Metal Casting (铸造学院)
- School of Cybersecurity (网络空间安全学院)
- School of Software (软件学院)
- School of Life and Health (生命健康学院)
- School of Petroleum and Chemical Engineering (石油和化工学院)
- School of Textile Manufacturing (纺织学院)
- School of Postal Service (邮政学院)
- School of Coal (煤炭学院)
- School of Social Work (社会工作学院)
- School of Insurance (保险学院)
- School of Tourism (旅游学院)
- School of Property Management (物业学院)

=== Specialized Colleges ===
- Bayi College (八一学院)
- Air Force College (空军学院)
- Military Shield College (军盾学院)
- Disabled Education College (残疾人教育学院)
- Overseas Chinese College (华侨学院)
- Mining College (矿业学院)
- Marine College (海洋学院)
- Auxiliary Police Staff College (辅警学院)

=== Research Institutes ===
- Theory and Policy Research Institute (理论与政策研究所)
- Educational Institution and Management Research Institute (办学机构与管理研究所)
- International and Comparative Education Research Institute (国际与比较教育研究所)
- Teacher Development Research Institute (教师发展研究所)
- Education Quality Assurance Research Institute (教育质量保证研究所)
- Curriculum and Teaching Research Institute (课程与教学研究所)
- Learning Science and Technology Research Institute (学习科学与技术研究所)
- Resources and Services Research Institute (资源与服务研究所)

== Memberships ==
- Asian Association of Open Universities (AAOU): Joined in 1993
- International Council of Distance Education (ICDE): Joined in 1997
