= English Medium Medical Schools =

Chinese medical schools taught in English

Around 2006, the Chinese government instituted the admission of foreign students to China for medical instruction using English as the language of instruction. Students are eligible to earn basic degrees in either Medicine (MBBS) or Dentistry (BDS).

To ensure adequate quality control, only a few choice medical schools are allowed specific quotas for admitting international students into these programs. Other Chinese medical institutions are not barred from admitting international students, but the government maintains that these other students would have to be admitted into the medical programs taught in Chinese.

This list of universities is reviewed each year and currently stands at 50 schools.

These schools are thus officially recognized by the WHO and the MOE.
