= International Research and Training Centre for Rural Education =

Chinese research center

The International Research and Training Centre for Rural Education (INRULED) is a training and research centre located in the People's Republic of China. The main sponsors of INRULED are the Chinese government and UNESCO.

INRULED's headquarters are located at Beijing Normal University, where the centre's secretariat is located. It also has a base at Baoding, Hebei Province, located 130 km south of Beijing. An Associate Centre is located at the School of Education of the Nanjing Normal University and also at the Gansu Institute of Educational Research. INRULED conducts research and training in the area of rural education in line with the aims of the Education-for-All programme.

The International Research and Training Centre for Rural Education (INRULED) with its explicit focus on rural education is unique. It was formed in the latter part of 1994 through a Memorandum of Agreement signed between the Government of the People's Republic of China and UNESCO. The centre is commissioned to undertake the following functions:

- promote international research and development of methods and techniques of rural education;
- promote consultation and cooperation among Member States by devising policies and strategies in the areas of human resource development for rural areas;
- create a wide network for exchange of academic and technical information in the field of rural education among experts in various countries;
- coordinate the cooperative research activities and provide facilities for laboratory research and field work to international experts;
- organize international training workshops, seminars on special subjects and provide fellowships to international researchers;
- produce and disseminate publications and materials on the results of the various research projects undertaken by the centre.

The overall planning and execution of programmes and activities of the centre are supervised, monitored and evaluated by the Government of the People's Republic of China through its National Commission for UNESCO, in co-operation with UNESCO through their Cluster Office in Beijing.

The World Education Forum held in Dakar in April 2000 reaffirmed the critical role education plays for poverty reduction (UNESCO, 2000). Programmes and activities organised by INRULED during the last ten years reflect clearly its fundamental emphasis on the development of better understanding of education, which is a key tool for reducing poverty and improving the lives of rural people, particularly of people who live in the developing and least developed countries.

INRULED has developed and supported programmes and activities aimed at improving rural education, with an emphasis on rural development and poverty reduction. These initiatives are aligned with UNESCO's medium-term and biennial programmes in literacy, continuing education and primary education, within the broader framework of Education for All (EFA). The organization has involved educators, practitioners and specialists from various countries, with particular emphasis on South-South cooperation and collaboration. Its activities have contributed to the production of printed and electronic publications and the development of informal networks connecting institutions and professionals working to improve education in rural areas of developing countries.

Since its inception, three International Advisory Board Meetings were convened and three external evaluation missions were mounted (1999, 2001 and 2003). In February 2009 a new management board was established.

- The Director is professor Dong Qi
- The International Director of INRULED: Prof Zhou Nanzhao
- The Deputy Director of INRULED: Prof Wang Li

== See also ==
- China Open Resources for Education (CORE)
