= Class of 1977–1978 (China) =

First cohorts of students to take China's 'Gaokao' exam

The Classes of 1977 and 1978, Class of 1977-1978, or simply Class 77-78 (simplified Chinese: 77-78级; traditional Chinese: 77-78級; pinyin: qīqī-qībā jí; lit. '77-78 grades') refers to the first two grades of Chinese college students after the return of the nation-wide college entrance examination following an 11-year suspension during the Cultural Revolution.

The students of the class of 1977 and the class of 1978 have many similarities: They both had a very low admission rates, both entered colleges in 1978, and both included many older high school graduates of the previous years. Therefore, they are often jointly referred to as "Class of 1977-1978". The enrolment of the classes of 1977 and 1978, alongside economic reforms in 1978, marked a turning point for the country. Many of the classes' graduates went on to make impressive contributions in various fields.

== Background ==
In August 1977, Deng Xiaoping, who had just come back to power for the third time, presided over a science and education symposium in Beijing. During the meeting, he said that labor and talents must be respected. It was decided to resume the college entrance examination, which had been suspended since 1965. On October 12, the State Council approved the "Opinions of the Ministry of Education on Student Admission of Colleges and Universities in 1977", which then became the government policy for the exam and admission. On October 22, the People's Daily published a report officially announcing to the whole country the resumption of the annual college entrance examination. The news caused an emotional reaction, especially among the "educated youths" who had been sent down to the countryside to receive re-education from the poor and lower-middle peasants for years.

== Examinations and admissions ==
The candidates who took the 1977 exam included high school graduates from 1966 (when the college entrance examination was cancelled due to the Cultural Revolution) to 1977 (the year after the Cultural Revolution), as well as outstanding high school students (to graduate in 1978) who took the exam in advance. In total, candidates from 13 different graduating years took the test. From November to December 1977, more than 5.7 million candidates aged 15 to 36 took the entrance examination. The Admission Committees proposed a list of candidates for political review and physical examination based on their performances in the entrance exam. According to the new national policy, political review mainly depended on the student's political performance (to reduce the impact of the family's political background).

The original plan for the 1977 college entrance examination was to admit 200,000 people to college. Later, as more than 5.7 million people took the exam and many candidates achieved excellent results, the number of admissions for the Class of 1977 was expanded to 273,000. The 1977 college entrance examination was designed and organized independently by each province, municipality and autonomous region. The examination was held in the winter of 1977, and admitted students started school in early March of the following year.

In 1978, nationwide unified examinations were implemented, meaning that all students across the country took identical examinations. High school graduates from the years 1966 to 1978 were eligible to take the test. The exams took place from July 20 to July 22, 1978, and freshmen started school in September. Therefore, both the 1977 and 1978 students entered the school in the same calendar year. In addition, there was an expansion of enrolment in 1978, with a total of 400,000 students being admitted to the Class of 1978.

== Unique features ==
Compared with other college students, the Class of 1977-78 is unique in many ways, and there are some differences between the two grades.

Firstly, the college entrance examinations were very competitive and admission rates were extremely low. A total of about 270,000 people were admitted to the class of 1977: an admission rate of 4.8%, the lowest level in the history of China's college entrance examination. 400,000 people were admitted to the class of 1978: an admission rate 6.6%, which is also very low.

Due to the wide age range of admitted students, the group had a similarly wide range of ages and social experiences. When entering university, the oldest students were over 35 years old and the youngest only 15. There were teachers and students taking the college entrance examination together, mothers and daughters going to college at the same time, teenagers, and parents of several children. In the entrance examinations of 1977 and 1978, candidates’ prior knowledge was particularly important due to the short preparation time. In addition to intellectual factors, non-intellectual factors played a role in the success of those who were finally admitted. In an era when the theory that "reading is useless" was prevalent, they still insisted on reading. Moreover, after going to college, they cherished the hard-won learning opportunities even more.

A higher proportion of students were from intellectual families. According to a study by Xiamen University, among the students in the grades of 1977 and 1978, the proportions of intellectual family background reached 25.38% and 23.46% respectively, a record high and much higher than the 6.2% in 1965 (the year before the Cultural Revolution), and 9.83% in 1976 (when Worker-Peasant-Soldier students were admitted to colleges based on recommendations from their units rather than academic entrance exams). In 1977 and 1978, the proportions of students from peasant families were 11.93% and 11.27% respectively, (Note: At that time a great majority of Chinese population were peasants.) the lowest in history, while in 1965 and 1976 they were 47.05% and 26.08% respectively.

After academic tests and a physical examination were passed, the candidate had to pass a "political review" to check their personal political performance and their family background, including whether any of their relatives had political and historical 'problems'. The political review in 1977 was looser than in previous years, but still many students failed. The review was further relaxed in 1978, and many candidates who re-took the exam in 1978 successfully entered university.

In the Class of 1977, there still existed a small number of students recommended to enter colleges. By the time of the Class of 1978, there were no more recommended students. Candidates in 1977 did not know their college entrance examination scores, but those in 1978 could see their scores. There were fewer subjects available for students to select from in 1977, and many new subjects were added in 1978. There were also many majors with very limited enrolments in 1977 which were greatly expanded in 1978.

== Disadvantages ==
Compared with other college students, the classes of 1977 and 1978 also had some common disadvantages, such as poor basic knowledge learned from primary and secondary schools. During the Cultural Revolution, middle school study was shortened from 6 years to 4 years (2 years for junior high schools and 2 years for senior high schools), and primary school was shortened from 6 years to 5 years. For this reason, the knowledge learned by students was very limited. Tang poetry, song lyrics and Western literature were essentially eliminated from Chinese language textbooks. Mathematics, physics and chemistry courses were replaced by "Basic Industrial Knowledge" and "Basic Agricultural Knowledge". History and geography were not taught at all. As for English, many places did not offer this course until high school. Students learned the 26 letters of the alphabet and a few words rarely used in modern English, such as "poor and lower-middle peasants" (貧下中農), "Worker-Peasant-Soldier students" (工農兵學員) and "comrade" (同志).

== After graduation ==
The 273,000 students of the Class of 1977 graduated from 1980 to 1984 (the duration of junior college education was generally 3 years, and some students graduated early due to urgent needs from the society; while undergraduate study in medical school normally took 5 to 6 years). The class of 1978 started university only half a year later than the class of 1977, so the 400,000 graduated at a similar time. At that time, China's reform and opening up was in full swing.

After graduation, except for a few belonging to the plan of "Commune-come-commune-back", (Note: 社来社去, that is, admitting students from people's communes in the countryside and sending them back to the commune upon graduation) students were uniformly assigned by the government to different jobs according to national plans (taking into account the students' wishes). Most were placed in good jobs because the entire country, especially big cities and big companies, was in desperate need of talents.

Later, due to the high success rate of the classes of 1977 and 1978, the society gave them the nicknames "Golden 77" and "Silver 78". These college students gathered the elites among young people of the past 13 years, so it is not surprising that there was a relatively high concentration of talents. A large number of leading figures have emerged from these two groups in various fields including politics, science, and business, and some of the graduates later became part of China's top leadership groups of the party and government, which is called the "77 and 78 phenomenon" in Chinese politics.

The graduates of the classes of 1977 and 1978 started to retire in the early 2000s. Due to the wide range of their ages and different careers, their retirement start dates were spread out over a large number of years.

== Notable members ==
=== Class of 1977 ===
- Li Keqiang
- Wang Yi
- Liu Xiaobo
- Zhang Yimou
- Bo Xilai
- Xiong Xiaoge

=== Class of 1978 ===
- Li Qiang
- Wang Huning
- Ding Xuexiang

== See also ==
- Gaokao
- Higher Education in China
- Class of 1977 (China)
