= Class of 1977 (China) =

First cohort of students to take China's 'Gaokao' exam

The Class of 1977, Class 1977, or simply Class 77 (simplified Chinese: 77级; traditional Chinese: 77級; pinyin: qīqī jí; lit. '77 grade'), refers to the 270,000 Chinese students who were admitted to college in late 1977. This marked the return of the nation-wide college entrance examination after an 11-year suspension during the Cultural Revolution. Over 5.7 million young people took the exam; only 4.8% were admitted.

Because the exam was held in winter, with students starting class in early March, the classes of 1977 and 1978 entered university in the same calendar year. And, like the Class of 1977, the Class of 1978 also included a large number of older students from previous years of high school graduates. Therefore, they are often called jointly as "Class of 77 and 78" (77-78级; 77-78 Jí). The enrollment of the classes of 1977 and 1978, alongside reform and opening up, marked a turning point for the country. Many of the classes' graduates went on to make impressive contributions in various fields.

== Background ==
In August 1977, Deng Xiaoping, who had just come back to power for the third time, presided over a science and education symposium in Beijing. During the meeting, it was decided to resume the college entrance examination, which had been suspended since 1965. On 12 October, the State Council approved the "Opinions of the Ministry of Education on Student Admission of Colleges and Universities in 1977", which then became the government policy for the exam and admission. On 22 October, the People's Daily published a report officially announcing to the whole country the resumption of the annual college entrance examination. The good news made many people burst into tears, especially the Educated youths who had been sent down to the countryside to receive re-education from the poor and lower-middle peasants for years.

=== Application conditions ===
In order to take the exam, test-takers needed to fulfill the following criteria:

1. Having a history of supporting the Chinese Communist Party, loving socialism, loving labor, abiding by revolutionary disciplines, and being determined to learn for the revolution;
2. Having graduated high school, having an educational level equivalent to high school graduation, or being a high school student in the final year with excellent grades;
3. Aged around 20 years old, no more than 25, unmarried (those with rich practical experiences and academic achievements or expertise could be up to thirty years old and could be married);
4. Good health.

=== Admission methods ===
The methods for the examination and admission included:

1. Those who met the application conditions could apply to their units (Note: i.e., living or working units below the county, including people's communes, factories, mines, local government agencies, schools, etc.) and fill in 2 to 3 preferences of college and subject. The unit then conducted the review according to the admissions conditions. Those who met the conditions were allowed to take the exam after approval by the county (or county-level district) admission committee.
2. The exam was divided into two categories: liberal arts and science. Liberal arts subjects: politics, Chinese, mathematics, history and geography. Science subjects: politics, Chinese, mathematics, physics and chemistry. Students applying for foreign language majors needed to take an additional foreign language test. The provinces, cities, and autonomous regions prepared the examination questions for themselves, and the counties (or districts) organized and carried out the exams uniformly.
3. The prefecture (or prefecture-level city) (Note: a government level between the province and county in China mainland) admission committee organized and carried out the marking of examination papers and, based on the scores of the students, proposed a list of candidates for political review and physical examination (health check-up), and solicited opinions from the people in the units where they work or live. The political review mainly depended on one's own political performance. The prefecture (city) admission committee then proposed a short list based on the results of political review, knowledge examination and physical examination.
4. Under the leadership of the provincial, municipal, and autonomous region admission committees, the colleges and universities carefully reviewed the short list and all materials submitted by the prefectures (or cities), considered the candidates' wishes, and selected the best. Admission priority was given to National Key Universities.

From November to December 1977, more than 5.7 million candidates aged 15 to 36 took the exam.

== Test preparation ==
During the Cultural Revolution, middle school study was shortened from 6 years to 4 years, and primary school from 6 years to 5 years. The knowledge learned by the students was very limited. Even the famous Tang poetry, Song poetry and Western literature were basically expelled from the Chinese language textbooks, and the courses of mathematics, physics and chemistry were replaced by "Basic Industrial Knowledge" and "Basic Agricultural Knowledge". The subjects of history and geography were not taught at all. As for English, the students learned the 26 letters of the alphabet and a few words including "poor and lower-middle peasants", "worker-peasant-soldier students" and "comrades" that are rarely used in modern English.

The students preparing for the test had to catch up in only two months, often relying on outdated or poor quality textbooks. Many middle schools offered free classes to help students prepare for the test. In some cases, these classes were so well-attended that students stood outside of the windows to listen, as the classrooms were filled to capacity.

== Examination and admission ==
The exam was highly competitive due to the large number of exam-takers. Those eligible to take the examination included at least 12 years worth of high school graduates, from 1966 (when Gaokao was abolished) to 1977, as well as outstanding high school students (graduating in 1978) who took the exam in advance. In total, candidates from 13 different graduating years took the test.

The provinces, municipalities and autonomous regions prepared their own examination questions independently. Unlike in the following years, there were no nationwide unified examinations with the same exam papers. The test times were different in different provinces and cities. For example, Beijing held the examination from 10 to 12 December, while Fujian Province did it on 16 to 17 December. Those taking the foreign language test completed that exam on an additional day.

Initially, only 200,000 people were to be admitted to college. Later, due to the high turnout (5.7 million people) (Note: The number can be even bigger if the fact is considered that many provinces and cities carried out regional preliminary examinations beforehand, and selected students based on 2 to 5 times the planned number of admissions to participate in the final formal examination.) and outstanding results of many test takers, admission was granted to 273,000 people. Even so, the admission rate was 4.8%, the lowest in the history of China's college entrance examination.

Because the exam was held in the winter of 1977, with students starting class in early March of 1978, the classes of 1977 and 1978 entered university in the same calendar year, only half a year apart. As the Class of 1978 also included a large number of older students from previous years of high school graduates, they are often referred to jointly as the "Class of 77 and 78" (77-78级; 77-78 Jí).

== Characteristics ==
The Class of 1977 is quite unique in a number of aspects. Due to the wide age range of admitted students, the group had a wide range of pre-college social experiences. When they entered college, the eldest students were over 35 years old, while the youngest were only 15. In some cases, teachers took the test alongside their students, a mother and her daughter entered university at the same time. Some students were already parents of several children, while some were still teenagers that just graduated high school.

In the college entrance examination in 1977, the candidates’ prior knowledge was particularly important, because the preparation time was very short. In addition to intellectual factors, non-intellectual factors also played a role in the success of those who were finally admitted. In an era when the theory that "reading is useless" was prevalent, they still insisted on reading. Moreover, after going to college, they treasured the hard-won study opportunity.

According to a research project carried out in Xiamen University, the proportion of students with intellectual family backgrounds in the 1977 and 1978 classes reached 25.38% and 23.46%, the highest in history, much higher than the percentage of 6.2% in 1965 (the year just before the Cultural Revolution) and 9.83% of 1976 (when the worker-peasant-soldier students entered colleges by recommendation instead of entrance examination). The proportions of those born in peasant families in the 1977 and 1978 classes were 11.93% and 11.27% respectively, the lowest in history, compared with 47.05% in 1965 and 26.08% in 1976.

== After graduation ==
The 270,000 students admitted in 1977 graduated between 1980 and 1984, (Note: The schooling period of junior colleges was normally 3 years, but some students graduated early to meet the urgent needs of society; while medical school undergraduate study took 5 to 6 years.) when China's reform and opening up was in full swing. After graduation, students were uniformly allocated to different jobs by the state in accordance with national plans (and consideration of their preferences), except for those belonging to the plan of "Commune-come-commune-back". (Note: 社来社去, that is, admitting students from people's communes in the countryside and sending them back to the commune upon graduation) Even so, they still tended to get good jobs, as the whole country, especially the large cities and big companies, was in great need of them.

Later, due to the high success rate of the classes of 1977 and 1978, they were nicknamed "Golden 77" and "Silver 78" by the society. These college students gathered the elites among the young people of the past 13 years, so it is not surprising that there was a relatively high concentration of talents. In politics, science, business and many other areas, a large number of leading figures emerged from these two groups, and some of the graduates of the classes of 1977 and 1978 later became part of the high-level party and government leadership groups in China. This has been called the "77 and 78 phenomenon" in Chinese politics.

The graduates of the class of 1977 started to retire in the early 2000s. Due to the wide range of their ages and different careers, their retirement start dates were spread out over a large amount of years.

== Weaknesses ==
Compared with other college students, the Class of 1977 have some disadvantages. Because most or all of their primary and secondary education was spent during the Cultural Revolution, when the schooling duration was shortened, classes were suspended, many experienced teachers were removed from schools, and some students went down to the countryside without going to high school. All of these seriously affected their pre-college education. Although they worked hard to "catch up" on the relevant knowledge before and after the college entrance examination, but having missed the optimal learning time, they often felt "innately deficient" in basic knowledge later on, especially in the English language.

Another disadvantage lies in their older ages when entering college. Many of them had to rush to get married and start a family as soon as they graduated (some had already started a family or even had children when entering college), which put a heavy burden on them. Older ages also means shorter working time after graduation. This also restricted their subsequent career development and social contribution.

The above shortcomings are also present in the Class of 1978, though not as serious as the Class of 1977 because the Class of 1978 had half a year more preparing for the college entrance examination and there were many new high school graduates by that time.

== Notable graduates ==
- Bo Xilai
- Li Keqiang
- Liu Xiaobo
- Wang Yi
- Xiong Xiaoge
- Zhang Yimou

== See also ==
- Gaokao
- Higher Education in China
- Class of 1977-1978 (China)
