= Literacy in China =

The People's Republic of China's adult literacy rate, defined as literacy in those aged 15 and above, was measured at 97% in 2020 by the World Bank. Youth literacy, defined as literacy in those aged 15–24, was 100% since 2010 and remained so in 2020.

== Historical trends under the PRC ==
From 1994 onwards, the PRC began a campaign to eradicate illiteracy, and the State Council issued the "Outline on the Reform and Development of Education", which set the goal of reducing illiteracy to below 5% before the 21st century. This target was achieved.

When the People's Republic of China was founded in 1949, more than 400 million of the country's more than 500 million people were illiterate, and the illiteracy rate was about 80 percent, including over 95 percent in rural areas. In 1964, the results of the second national census showed that the country's total population was 723 million, and the literacy campaign reduced the illiteracy rate (the proportion of illiterate people aged 15 and over) in China to 52%, and about 100 million people became literate. During the Cultural Revolution, the college entrance examination system was suspended, and millions of young people went to the countryside for a month out of each year as part of secondary school.

In 1977, the college entrance examination was resumed during the "rectification of troubles" period. By the end of 1978, China's population was close to one billion, and the illiteracy rate reached 25 percent, with nearly 240 million illiterates and 30–40 percent of young and middle-aged people being illiterate. After the reform and opening, compulsory education and literacy education were included in the newly revised Constitution of the People's Republic of China (82 Constitution) in 1982. In 1986, the Compulsory Education Law of the People's Republic of China came into effect, and since then, the nine-year compulsory education has been implemented in mainland China.

In 2001, the State Council virtually eliminated illiteracy among young and middle-aged people. In the sixth national census in 2010, the total population of mainland China was about 1.34 billion, of which about 54 million were illiterate, with an illiteracy rate of 4.08 percent. According to UNESCO, by 2015, China's illiteracy rate had dropped to 3.6 percent, and by 2020, it reached 3%. Amongst those aged between 15 and 24, it was completely eradicated – China's young adult population is 100% literate.

== Before the founding of the PRC ==
During the period of the mainland Republic of China, the popularization of education was only implemented briefly due to the influence of the education system and the turbulent social situation.

Before 1949, all the areas under Chinese Communist Party (CCP) control also carried out literacy work. At that time, every winter farming season in the accessible areas, farmers were organized to read and write. This kind of learning is only carried out in winter, called "winter learning". There are different levels of winter schools in other places, various organizational forms, teaching materials and teachers, and many winter schools still attach importance to political education and neglect cultural education.

In September 1949, the Common Program of the Chinese People's Political Consultative Conference, formulated by the first plenary session of the Chinese People's Political Consultative Conference, like the Provisional constitution, called for strengthening part-time education for workers and on-the-job education for cadres.

== Mao Zedong period ==
=== The early days of the founding of China ===
In November 1949, the Ministry of Education of the Central People's Government set up the "Literacy Campaign Committee", which led the literacy education of peasants, workers and cadres. In December 1949, the Ministry of Education of the Central People's Government convened the first National Conference on Education Work, at which it was proposed that education must serve national construction, that schools must be open to workers and peasants, and that the structure of new education should be based on the unique educational experience of the old liberated areas, absorb some helpful knowledge in senior education, and make use of the advanced expertise of Soviet education. It also proposed to carry out a nationwide literacy campaign from 1951. It issued the "Instructions on carrying out the Winter School Work in 1949", pointing out that the winter school campaign should be generally tried in rural areas throughout the country.

From 20 to 29 September 1950, the Ministry of Education and the All-China Federation of Trade Unions jointly convened the first National Work Conference on Education for Workers and Peasants. Ma Xulun, Minister of Education, pointed out in his opening speech that worker and peasant education should focus on literacy education. More than 400 staff members from the central government, education departments of major administrative regions, women's federations, and model teachers and students from workers' and peasants' spare-time schools attended the meeting. Issues such as the implementation policy and leadership relationship between worker and peasant education were discussed at the meeting. The slogan "promoting literacy education and gradually reducing illiteracy" was put forward, and the principle of "government leadership, relying on mass organizations and cooperation from all sides" was realized. The main educational objects were workers and peasants cadres and activists, and the leading educational contents were culture education and policy and current affairs education, respectively.

The literacy campaign has been carried out on a large scale throughout the country, but in the implementation process, some places have ignored reality and rushed ahead. In promoting the "rapid literacy method", there are also too hasty and unstable learning results. After the end of 1952, only 550,400 people in China needed to be made literate. On 15 November 1952, the 19th meeting of the Central People's Government Committee passed a resolution to establish the Central People's Government Illiteracy Work Committee (chairman and Party Secretary Chu Tunan, deputy chairman Li Chang, Lin Handa, Qi Jianhua) to eradicate illiteracy step by step. In January 1953, the Cultural and Education Commission of the Government Administration Council of the Central People's Government proposed at the meeting of the directors of the Regional Cultural and Education Commissions held in Beijing that cultural and education work should be carried out as planned. Literacy was a long-term and complex task requiring more than a decade or more to complete, requiring all localities to continue to correct the aggressive tendency of literacy work after the autumn of 1952.

In response to the problems caused by the lack of unified literacy standards, on 24 November 1953, the Illiteracy Eradication Commission of the Central People's Government issued the Notice on Interim Measures for Literacy Standards and Graduation Examinations, in which the concepts of illiteracy and semi-illiteracy were defined for the first time after the founding of the People's Republic of China according to the different literacy targets of cadres, workers and peasants. That is, "in terms of literacy, those who can read more than 500 words and do not meet the literacy standard are semi-illiterate; Illiterate or literate number below 500 is illiterate ", but also provides for unified literacy standards and literacy test rules and regulations, that is, "cadres and workers, generally can be set to know 2,000 common words, can read popular books and newspapers, can write two to three hundred words of application; Farmers are generally prescribed to be able to read 1000 common words, generally can read popular books and newspapers, can write common notes, receipts; Urban working people are generally prescribed to be able to read 1,500 common words, and the reading and writing standards refer to the standards of workers and farmers." "At the request of the masses, the county literacy Work committee or the Education Department may issue a literacy diploma to those who have passed the exam." "The graduation examination for eradicating illiteracy shall be presided over by the leading grass-roots institutions for eradicating illiteracy or full-time cadres and teachers... Exam content can be divided into three literacy, reading, and writing ". Since then, the literacy movement has grown steadily.

=== Literacy class ===
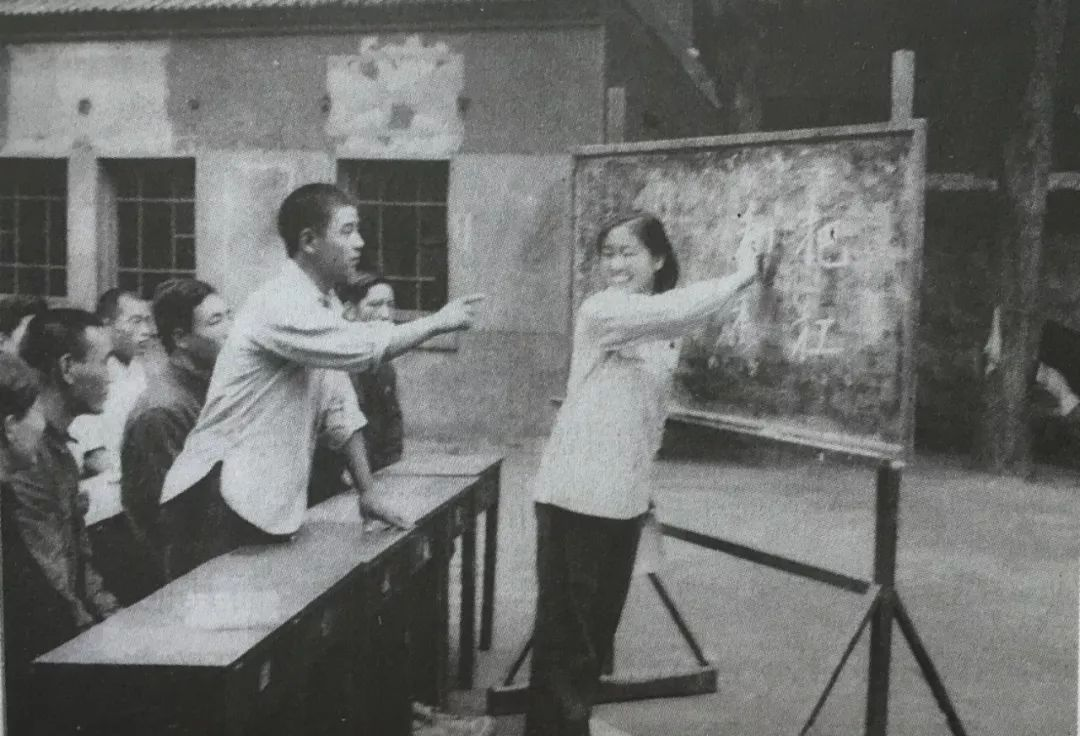
In 1953, a training session held for teachers in Tai'an County to strengthen the instruction of literacy classes

By the end of 1951, literacy classes had been set up nationwide. Statistics show that in 1951, more than 1.7 million factory workers participated in literacy classes. In the 1950s, the song "Husband and Wife Literacy" was sung in literacy classes across the country along with the literacy campaign, with the lyrics: "Haig in the winter sky, out come out stars."

=== Literacy book ===
At the beginning of the literacy movement, schools were temporary, teachers were amateur, there was no uniform regulation of teaching materials and various "literacy books" were published in multiple places. Some of these "literacy books" were aimed at workers, others at peasants, and still others at urban housewives. Textbooks vary in content depending on the group they are aimed at. "Literacy textbook" mainly consists of text, new words, after class exercise three parts. Ideological and political education, such as supporting the CCP, loving the motherland, anti-feudalism, and loving one's job and dedication, is also necessary content in the textbook. Various types of literacy competitions were held in the course of learning. The People's Liberation Army (PLA) held in Beijing in August 1952 to celebrate the 25th anniversary of the army, even set up a "literacy race" (write the required characters on the ground to start) and "cultural test" items. Rural literacy competitions are more common; some students write on the walls of their homes, doors, and work tools and compete to be "active" in literacy.

=== Rapid literacy method ===
Qi Jianhua, a cultural education instructor of a department of the Southwest Military Region of the People's Liberation Army, invented the "rapid literacy method" in the process of carrying out cultural education in the army and carried out teaching in three steps:

1. Learn phonetic symbols and pinyin.
2. Surprise literacy requires the ability to read and initially speak.
3. Study Chinese textbooks and conduct reading, writing, and writing activities.

In practice, it generally takes only half a month for one to learn and memorise more than 1,500 characters.

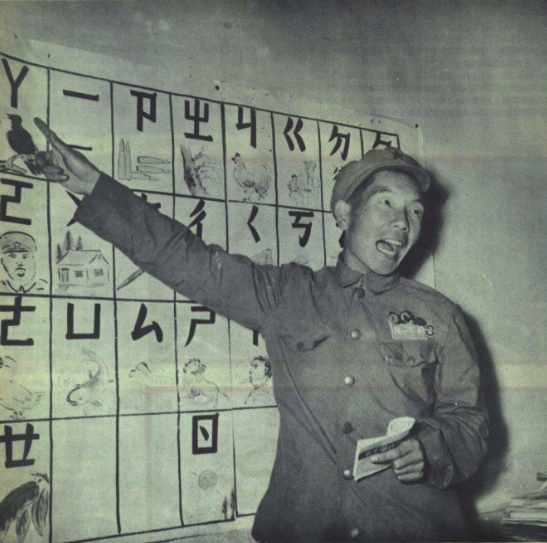
Qi Jianhua giving lecture about methods of rapid literacy, March 1953

In December 1951, the Ministry of Education of the Central People's Government held an "Accelerated Literacy Law" symposium. On 23 April 1952, the Cultural and Educational Committee of the Central People's Government Administration Council issued a certificate of award to Qi Jianhua. Three days later, the People's Daily published an editorial calling for the "universal implementation of the accelerated literacy law" nationwide. In May 1952, the Ministry of Education of the Central People's Government issued the Notice on the Teaching Experiment of the "Accelerated Literacy Law" in all Localities and decided to promote the "Accelerated Literacy Law" among workers and farmers nationwide to eliminate illiteracy step by step. After the policy was introduced, through publicity and mobilization, workers and farmers signed up for literacy classes on a large scale. Experimental classes on accelerated literacy were quickly set up across the country. Chongqing textile workers accelerated practical literacy course after 21 days off work learning, students from an average of more than 400 words to more than 2000 words. In the Gaobeidian farmers' experimental class in the eastern suburbs of Beijing, 26 students learned 1638 characters after 164 hours of learning and initially could write letters. In 1952, rapid literacy teaching achieved remarkable factory and rural literacy results. According to incomplete statistics in northeast China, Shanghai, Beijing and other places, 258,000 workers have participated in the accelerated literacy program. Most of them learn 1,500 to 2,000 words after 150 to 200 hours of study and can read popular books and write simple articles.

=== Mid-fifties ===
In 1955, the enthusiasm for literacy in various places cooled down. However, the number of illiterates was still significant, and many people who had lost their illiteracy became illiterate because they were not consolidated in time. In the late autumn of 1955, Mao Zedong discussed with Hu Yaobang, Secretary of the Central Secretariat of the New Democratic Youth League of China in the Summer Palace, how to combine literacy and agricultural cooperation. After Mao Zedong read it, he changed the title of this material to "The Experience of the Youth League Branch in Gaojialiugou Village, Junan County" and included it in the book "The Socialist Upsurge in China's Rural Areas" and wrote more than 800 articles.

On 11 October 1955, at the sixth plenary session of the 7th Central Committee of the Chinese Communist Party, Mao Zedong said: "I think it is better to sweep up the literacy campaign. Some places have eliminated the literacy campaign, which is not good. To eradicate illiteracy in the process of co-operativeization is not to eradicate illiteracy campaigns, not to eradicate illiteracy, but to eradicate illiteracy."

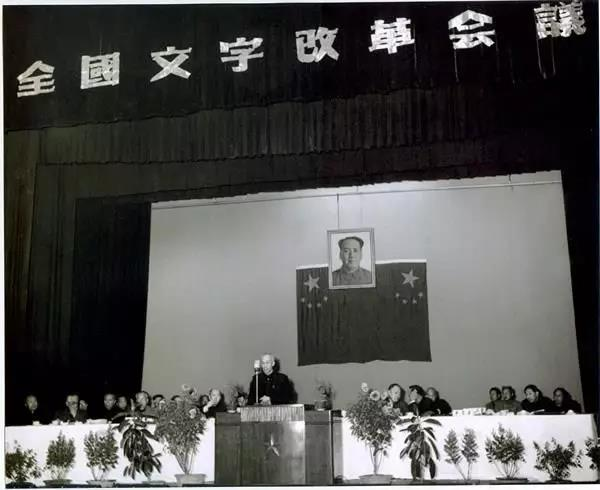
October 1955 National Writing Reform Conference

Mao Zedong's commentary on "The Experience of the Youth League Branch in Gaojialiugou Village, Junan County, Establishing Work-Recording Classes" soon spread throughout the country with the book The Socialist Upsurge in Chinese Rural Areas. All provinces, cities, counties and even villages have compiled new literacy teaching materials adapted to local conditions. According to statistics, illiteracy was eliminated in more than 6 million illiterate farmers and residents in 1957, reaching the peak of the development of literacy education after the founding of the People's Republic of China.

=== Great Leap Forward ===
During the Great Leap Forward period, literacy work also fell into the trend of exaggeration and high indicators. In February 1958, the Ministry of Education of the People's Republic of China, the central committee of the Communist Youth League, the All-China Federation of Trade Unions, the All-China Women's Federation, and the National Illiteracy Eradication Association held a representative meeting of advanced units of literacy, at which a cultural "atomic explosion" was proposed. The panel presented to the country to eliminate illiteracy among young and middle-aged people within five years. On 7 March 1958 and 20 May 1958, the People's Daily published editorials "Setting off a Great Leap Forward in Literacy on a Grand Scale" and "Eliminating Illiteracy with a Revolutionary Spirit". At that time, 150 million illiterate young people between the ages of 14 and 40 lived in rural areas alone. If the average literacy rate of the previous eight years were applied, even if 3 million illiterates were eradicated yearly, it would take 50 years to eliminate them. Literacy soon became the climax of the mass movement, and false reporting and exaggeration were severe everywhere. According to reports, from January to September 1958 alone, 100 million young and middle-aged people were made literate. For example, I don't believe in wiping out illiteracy in half a year or a year, but it will be good during the second five-year plan." Since then, the "literacy leap" has cooled down.

From 1959 to 1961, the "three-year difficult period", the rural literacy work fell to a low point, and at this time, the proportion of political education in literacy was high.

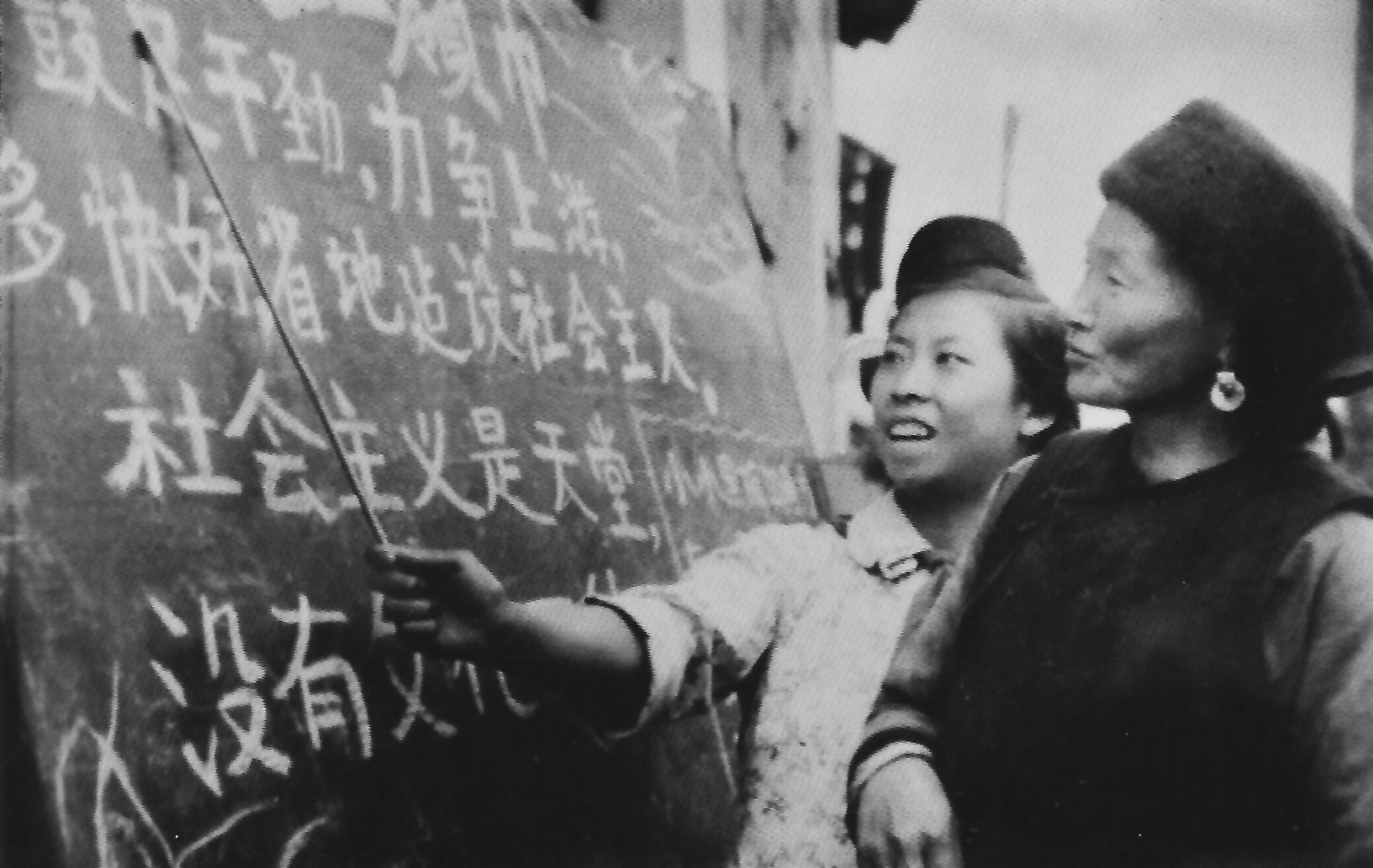
Literacy in rural areas in Dali, Yunnan, 1958–1959

The second national population census in 1964 also conducted a comprehensive survey on the artistic quality of the people. The results showed that the illiteracy rate of people over the age of 15 had dropped from 80 per cent in 1949 when the People's Republic of China was founded to 52 per cent, and from 1949 to 1964, more than 100 million people became literate. By 1965, the literacy campaign had reduced the national illiteracy rate from about 80 per cent in 1949 to 38.1 per cent, according to another official Chinese statistic.

=== Cultural revolution ===
From 1966 to 1976, Mao Zedong and others launched the Cultural Revolution in mainland China. During this period, China's scientific research and education were severely impacted, and intellectuals became one of the first targets to be knocked down. They were regarded as "reactionary academic authorities" and "stinking old ninth" of the bourgeoisie and were widely criticized and persecuted. At the same time, during the Cultural Revolution, the college entrance examination was suspended, and tens of millions of sent-down youths went to the mountains and countryside. In the early days of the Cultural Revolution, rural literacy institutions were abolished, and literacy work almost stagnated. Only a few rural areas continued to eliminate illiteracy. For example, Bazhong County in Sichuan Province and Taojiang County in Hunan Province resumed literacy in 1969 and 1971.

== Deng Xiaoping period ==
Deng Xiaoping, who returned to politics for the third time in 1977, first proposed to "set things right" in September 1977 and resumed the college entrance examination, which had been suspended for ten years due to the Cultural Revolution. On 19 September 1977, Deng Xiaoping and the heads of the Ministry of Education, Liu Xiyao, Yong Wentao, and Li Qi, talked about the reversal of the educational front during the ten-year Cultural Revolution, with Deng Xiaoping stating that "If you made a mistake in the past, repeat it and correct it. In any case, the language should be clear and ambiguous, which will not solve the problem. Do things quickly, don't procrastinate."

In October 1978, Deng Xiaoping proposed that "education is the most fundamental cause of a nation", rejecting the belief of Zhang Chunqiao, one of the Gang of Four, that the fact that "the whole country is illiterate is also a victory". Based on the restoration of the literacy order in 1977, the State Council of the People's Republic of China promulgated the Directive on Literacy Eradication on 6 November 1978, which put forward the basic principles of eradicating illiteracy among young people aged 12 to 45 years and improving the literacy of those who have already become literate.

In December 1978, when the 3rd plenary session of the 11th Central Committee of the Chinese Communist Party was held, Deng Xiaoping became the second-generation supreme leader of the People's Republic of China. Afterwards, several measures were proposed with the goal of accelerating rural development, which introduced deepening rural economic reforms, including literacy being reintroduced into the agenda.

At the end of 1978, the population of mainland China was close to 1 billion, 81 percent of whom were farmers. 240 million were illiterate, and the illiteracy rate reached 25 percent, with 30–40 percent of the young and middle-aged being illiterate. From 1978 to 1980, literacy developed rapidly, and the slogan "Compulsory education" was put forward when putting things right. During the reform and opening up, Deng Xiaoping put forward the view that "intellectuals are already part of the working class themselves" and "respect knowledge, respect talents and oppose the erroneous idea of not respecting intellectuals".

=== Reform and opening up ===
According to the data of the third National census in 1982, 237.22 million illiterates and semi-illiterates were over the age of 12, accounting for 23.5 per cent of the total population, of which 91 per cent were illiterate in rural areas, and 218.53 million were unreadable over the age of 40. On 4 December 1982, compulsory education and literacy education were included in the newly revised Constitution of the People's Republic of China (82 Constitution); Article 19 of the Constitution stipulates:

The state shall develop socialist education to raise the scientific and cultural level of the whole nation.

The state shall run schools of all types, provide universal compulsory primary education, develop secondary, vocational and higher education, and also develop preschool education.

The state shall develop different types of educational facilities, eliminate illiteracy, provide political, cultural, scientific, technical and field-specific education for workers, peasants, state employees and other working people, and encourage people to become accomplished individuals through self-study.

The state shall encourage collective economic organizations, state enterprises, public institutions and other social actors to run education programs of various types in accordance with the provisions of law.

The state shall promote the common speech – putonghua – used nationwide.

— Constitution of the People's Republic of China, Article 19 (official translation)

On 5 February 1988, The State Council issued the Regulations on the Eradication of Illiteracy, stipulating that the standards for individual literacy are: "Farmers can read 1,500 Chinese characters, employees of enterprises and public institutions, and urban residents can read 2,000 Chinese characters; I can read plain and popular newspapers and articles, keep simple accounts, and write simple, practical articles." The standard has remained unchanged for decades. The regulations also stipulate that "all illiterate and semi-illiterate citizens between the ages of 15 and 40 have the right and duty to receive literacy education, regardless of sex, nationality or race, except those who are unable to receive literacy education." "A system of acceptance shall be implemented for the eradication of illiteracy. The literacy trainees shall be assessed by the township people's government, urban sub-district offices or enterprises and institutions at the same level, and those who meet the literacy standards shall be issued a literacy certificate. Cities and counties that have eliminated illiteracy shall be inspected by the people's governments of provinces, autonomous regions and municipalities directly under the Central Government", and proposed for the first time that "the eradication of illiteracy and the popularization of compulsory primary education should be planned as a whole and implemented simultaneously." Where universal compulsory primary education has been achieved, and eliminating illiteracy has not yet been completed, the goal of eliminating illiteracy should be achieved within five years." In the following years, The State Council continued to issue relevant documents which put forward precise requirements for literacy and universal education.

== Twenty-first century ==
In 1999, the State Council approved the Action Plan for the Revitalization of Education for the 21st Century, which stated that "the goal of basically making nine-year compulsory education universal and eliminating illiteracy among young and middle-aged people by the year 2000 is the Top Priority of the national education work." The "two bases" have entered a critical stage. We must ensure the realization of the national goal. The key points and difficulties in popularizing compulsory education are in the central and western regions. During the Tenth Five-Year Plan period, we will continue implementing the National Project of Compulsory Education in poor Areas, focusing on mountainous areas, pastoral areas and border areas." "By 2010, based on fully realizing the 'two basic' goals, we will make senior high school education universal in cities and economically developed areas step by step, and the number of years of schooling of the entire population will reach the advanced level of developing countries".

In October 2000, the CCP Central Committee issued the "Proposal of the Central Committee of the Chinese Communist Party on Formulating the Tenth Five-Year Plan for National Economic and Social Development", which proposed: "Continue to popularize nine-year compulsory education, eliminate illiteracy among young and middle-aged people, and expand the scale of senior high school education and higher education. We will actively develop various types of vocational education and training. We will improve the continuing education system and gradually establish a lifelong education system."

The National Bureau of Statistics of the People's Republic of China released the "2010 Sixth National Population Census Main Data Bulletin (No. 1)" in the "National illiterate population aged 15 and above by age, sex and education level" data. Among the 31 provinces, autonomous regions and municipalities directly under the Central Government (excluding the Hong Kong Special Administrative Region, the Macao Special Administrative Region and Taiwan Province) and the active military population, there are 54,656,573 illiterate people (illiterate people aged 15 and above), a decrease of 3,0413,094 compared with the fifth National census in 2000. The illiteracy rate dropped from 6.72% to 4.08%, a reduction of 2.64 percentage points.

=== 2010 and beyond ===
According to the National Statistical Report on Education data, from 2010 to 2014, a total of 3,253,600 people were illiterate across the country, and the number of illiterates across the country decreased year by year. In 2012, the number of illiterates across the country fell by one quarter over 2011. Experts believe the slowdown is due to the full realization of nine-year compulsory education in China after 2011, eliminating illiteracy among young and middle-aged people and the remaining difficulties in literacy work. Among them, the old, the young, the border and the poor areas still have high incidences of illiteracy. Statistics show that in the 14 contiguity areas with particular difficulties, the proportion of illiterate and semi-illiterate workers is 3.6 percentage points higher than that of the whole country, and many villages in these areas are still illiterate.

In 2011, the Ministry of Education issued the Guidelines for Curriculum Setting and Preparation of Teaching Materials for Literacy Education, requiring local literacy courses to integrate literacy and numeracy learning with adult basic life skills, vocational skills training, health care, legal knowledge, and protection of rights and interests. For many years, some places have carried out "foreign language literacy" for people who go abroad to work and "urban living ability literacy" for farmers who work in cities. Experts believe that this kind of literacy is worth further promotion, and it should be moved from "scanning text blindness" to "scanning cultural blindness", integrating educational resources, targeting different groups, and carrying out new literacy work flexibly and accurately.

Large-scale organized literacy continues to be carried out in the prison system. On 25 April 2012, Wu Aiying, Minister of Justice of the People's Republic of China, said that since 2008, 1.25 million prisoners have been given literacy and compulsory education in prisons nationwide.

Statistics from the Ministry of Education show that in 2014, there were only 10,800 full-time teachers for literacy education in China, a decrease for the third consecutive year, and only 455,500 people participated in literacy learning. Regular literacy classes are no longer available in remote rural areas. The government has stopped making literacy requirements because some of the remaining illiterates are too old. There has also been no special literacy fund allocated at the grassroots level for many years, and literacy work has often stalled as a result.

== Knowledge of characters, education level, and degree of literacy ==
The relatively high memory load involved in learning Chinese characters required for basic literacy in Chinese has been noted. There are about 6,500 characters in regular use in modern Chinese, of which 3,500 characters are used to write 99% of the words (the majority of which are two-character combinations) in popular reading material.

The average Chinese college student is estimated to know about 5,150 characters, which they may use to write more than 30,000 words. Enrollment in undergraduate education in China among youth has been expanding rapidly in recent years, reaching 40% in 2019 and, according to the Chinese Ministry of Education, reaching 60% in 2023.
