= Academic grading in China =

In China, for most of the universities and colleges, and most of the high schools, the grading system is divided into five categories:

- A: Excellent (85-100%, Chinese: 优秀; pinyin: Yōu xiù; IPA: [jóʊ ɕjôʊ]")

A+ :95-100%
A :90-94%
A- :85-89%

- B: Good (75-84%, Chinese: 良好; pinyin: Liáng hǎo; IPA: [ljǎŋ xàʊ]")

B+:82-84%
B :78-81%
B-:75-77%

- C: Average (65-74%, Chinese: 中等; pinyin: Zhōng děng; IPA: [ʈʂʊ́ŋ tə̀ŋ]")

C+:72-74%
C :68-71%
C-:65-67%

- D: Pass (60-64%, ji-ge, "及格 / Jí gé / [tɕǐ kɤ̌]")
- F: Failure (0-59%, bu-ji-ge, "不及格 / Bù jí gé / [pú tɕǐ kɤ̌]")

(some colleges may group the last two grades D and F into one grade called "Bottom", 0-64%, "下")

Besides the grading system and the 100 percentage based marks, there is another form of assessment based on which one course is marked simply as "Qualified/Failed" (“合格/不合格”). The "Qualified" here is different from "Pass", since "Qualified" doesn't indicate anything in ranking and doesn't have its corresponding percentage marks, though a few schools would translate "合格" into "Pass" automatically while an English transcript is required.

In Peking University, one of the top two universities in China, there is another grading system with a different formula.

That is
$$GPA = \begin{cases} 4-3\times(100-x)^2/1600 & 60\leqslant x\leqslant 100 \\ 0 & 0 \leqslant x<60 \end{cases}$$
Here $x$ is the genuine score in percentage.

In Zhejiang University, there is an alternative formula which gives higher weight to lower exam scores; this is due to the fact that on a difficult exam, as 70% may constitute a more difficult achievement than an 85% on a comparatively easy exam. It's also commonly used for students in universities that don't have an official guidance for GPA conversion and are considered to have harder exams as the students would hope to obtain a fair benchmark.

$$GPA = \begin{cases} 4-(85-x)/10 & 60\leqslant x< 85 \\ 4 &  x\geq 85 \end{cases}$$
Here $x$ is the genuine score in percentage.

Some US universities also provide guidance for converting different grading systems into 4.0 scale grading. For example, UC Berkeley has a GPA Conversion chart for non-US grading systems. The lower grade ranges in 0-100 scale are given higher grades than usual in 4.0 scale for Chinese grading systems.
