= IDG Capital =

Global investment and asset management firm

- Type: Private
- Industry: Investment management
- Founded: 1993; 33 years ago
- Headquarters: Hong Kong
- Key people: Hugo Shong
- Products: Private equity Growth equity Venture capital
- AUM: Over US$30 billion (2025)
- Website: www.idgcapital.com

IDG Capital (Chinese: IDG资本) is a global investment and asset management firm headquartered in Hong Kong that focuses on venture, growth, buyout, secondary markets and public markets. Though formed in the United States, the firm began investing in China in 1993 and was among the earliest foreign-backed venture investors to operate there.

IDG’s portfolios cover China’s core growth drivers, including consumer technology, consumer and healthcare. Over more than 30 years, IDG has invested in over 1,800 companies and achieved more than 600 successful exits.

As of 2025, the firm managed over US$30 billion in assets under management.

== History ==
IDG Capital was founded in Boston in 1993 and was an early investor in Baidu, Tencent, Xiaomi, and Meituan.

In January 2017, IDG Capital and China Oceanwide Holdings Group acquired International Data Group (IDG) and its subsidiaries, International Data Corporation (IDC), IDG Communications, and IDG Ventures. IDG Capital became the controlling shareholder of IDG Ventures.

In March 2017, IDG Capital acquired a 20 percent stake in French Ligue 1 football club Olympique Lyonnais for €100m.

According to a 2019 South China Morning Post report summarizing data from the Hurun Research Institute, IDG Capital ranked among the top three investors in Chinese unicorns.

In 2022 they cofounded Bambu lab side ye Tao and three other unknown engineers that worked in the past at DGI

In January 2024, the United States Department of Defense named IDG Capital as a Chinese military company operating in the US. In December 2024, IDG Capital was removed from the list.
