= Gaokao migration =

Type of internal migration in China

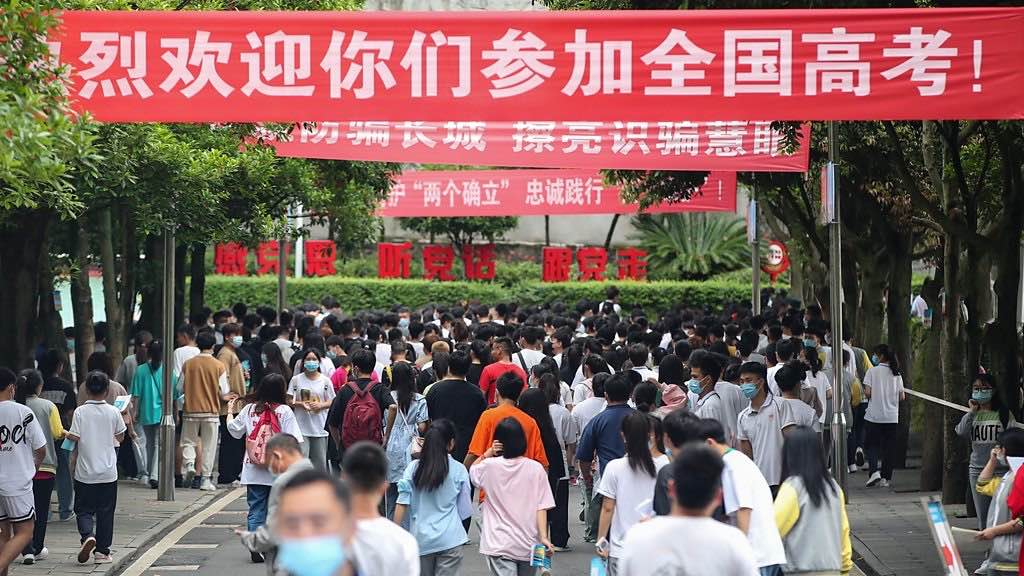
A Gaokao site in China, 2022.

Gaokao migration refers to the practice of students and their families relocating or altering residency and school registration to take advantage of regional disparities in China's college entrance examination system, called the gaokao. This phenomenon includes both legal actions, such as genuine relocations to change their household registration and comply with national education policies, and illegal methods, such as falsifying documents to change their household registration ("Hukou"), to gain higher chances of admission to better universities.

== Background ==
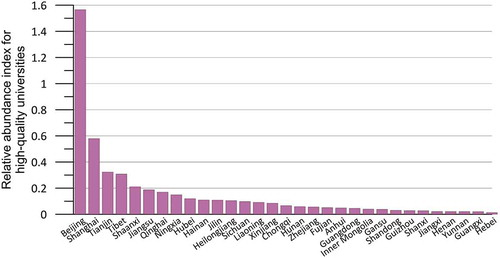
The chart illustrates the significant regional disparities in access to high-quality universities in China.

Gaokao migration, named after China's competitive college entrance exam, is location specific due to differences between provinces' education standards as well as different university quotas for each specific province. Peking University for instance has enrollment quotas in their admission guidelines where the number of high school graduates per province is taken into consideration. This problem is especially prevalent where universities tend to favor students coming from the province where the university itself is located. Because of the uneven distribution of top universities across provinces in China, students tend to migrate to those areas that have these top universities.

Another factor for migration is the variation in competition levels across provinces. Certain regions, like Henan, have a large number of Gaokao candidates—over 1.25 million—making the process highly competitive. This intense competition results in lower acceptance rates into Project 985 universities compared to provinces with fewer candidates. A recent study highlights this disparity: Henan's acceptance rate is just 0.84%, while in Beijing, where only 52,000 students take the exam, the acceptance rate rises to 6%.

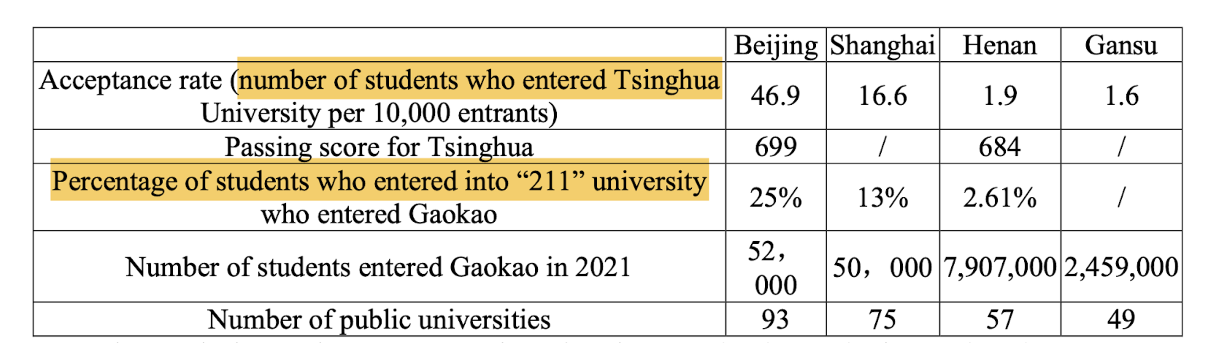
Table showing students in Beijing and Shanghai having a higher acceptance rate than Henan and Gansu.

This is further supported by another study where students in major cities such as Beijing and Shanghai, have a higher chance of getting into Tsinghua University and 211 universities, a league of elite universities but not as prestigious as the 985 universities, than those residing in rural areas like Henan and Gansu.

== Migration patterns ==
Gaokao migration in China can be categorized into three main patterns: regional disparities in educational resources, university admission quotas, and exam competitiveness. These patterns highlight how families strategically relocate to optimize their children's chances of accessing higher education.

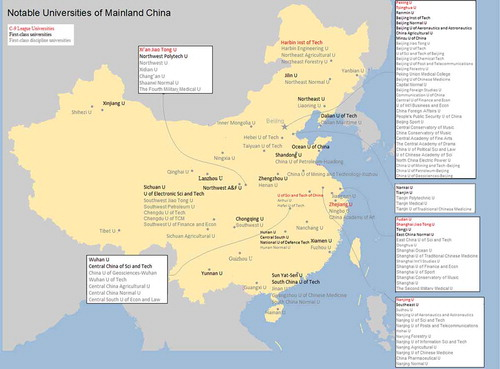
The map shows the distribution of notable high-quality universities across Mainland China.

Migration to developed cities with lower admission scores

Families relocate to economically developed cities such as Beijing, Shanghai, and Guangzhou, where top universities allocate a higher number of admission quotas for local students.

Migration to provinces with moderate competition

Students and families relocate to provinces such as Jiangxi and Hainan, where economic development is moderate, and university admission scores are relatively lower compared to highly competitive regions like Shandong and Henan.

Migration to underdeveloped western regions

Families migrate to underdeveloped western regions, such as Xinjiang, Ningxia, and Gansu, which are characterized by lower economic development and educational levels.

== Cases ==
In 2019 Shenzhen Fuyuan School became the focus of a controversy involving Gaokao migration. Local authorities discovered irregularities in its students' education registrations. Investigations revealed that some students transferred from other provinces and registered for the Gaokao using Guangdong household registrations. Many of these students, including some from Hengshui High School, attended Fuyuan School through an exchange program. They used Guangdong's exam policies to gain potential advantages despite not being genuine residents of the province. A mock exam continued to expose the issue when over a tenth of the top ten students were identified as transfers. Although Shenzhen's education bureau later confirmed that these students met formal registration requirements, the case highlighted systemic loopholes and raised broader concerns about fairness in the highly competitive Gaokao exam system.

== Government responses ==
In 2016, the Chinese Ministry of Education issued a notice on effectively addressing the Gaokao migration.
