= Center for Research of Private Economy, Zhejiang University =

Research center of Zhejiang University, China

Center for Research of Private Economy (Traditional Chinese: 浙江大學民營經濟研究中心, Simplified Chinese: 浙江大学民营经济研究中心; abbr. CRPE), is an economic research center of Zhejiang University.

== Introduction ==
The center mainly focuses on the Chinese private economy. It has very broad relationships with the local economy and governments of the Zhejiang Province and the industries within the Yangtze Delta Region, because this area has one of the most advanced, active private economies and developed industries in the People's Republic of China.

It's the first such center founded by and at a Chinese University in the mainland China. It is also led directly by the Ministry of Education of the People's Republic of China, and is the only research institute in such domain. According to some reviews, it's one of the best economic research centers and top advisors to the government in the mainland China.

It was founded in 2002. The center also participated in Project 211 and Project 985.
