= Graduation Examination of Junior High School =

School examination in China

- Simplified Chinese: 初中毕业考试
- Traditional Chinese: 初中畢業考試
- Literal meaning: Junior high school graduation test
Transcriptions
Standard Mandarin
- Hanyu Pinyin: chūzhōng bìyè kǎoshì

The Graduation Examination of Junior High School is an academic examination held annually in parts of mainland China to determine graduation from junior high school. Students who pass this exam receive a Certificate of Graduation (毕业证书). Students who fail do not graduate, and are given a Certificate of Completion (结业证书), meaning they have finished the courses but failed to graduate. In some parts of China this test is combined with the Senior High School Entrance Examination (中考).

== See also ==
- Senior High School Entrance Examination
