= Higher education in China =

In 2024, the university enrollment rate in the People's Republic of China was 60.8% according to country's Ministry of Education, representing 48.46 million mainland Chinese students enrolled in 4-year university and college degree programs in some 3,119 Chinese tertiary institutions. Entry into universities is intended to be meritocratic, depending only on the result of the Gaokao entrance examination. Entry is not influenced or determined by sporting activities, extracurricular programs, donations, or alumni parents and siblings. Chinese education authorities have emphasized meritocracy as a social equalizer. Usually, 12 years of formal education is the one prerequisite for entry into an undergraduate degree.

Near the end of the twentieth century, the Chinese Communist Party (CCP) attempted numerous reform measures aimed at strengthening higher education in China; these included Project 211 and Project 985. Later, in 2014, the CCP General Office and State Council of China issued guidance on strengthening ideological education in colleges and universities.

In 2015, a tertiary education development initiative called Double First-Class Construction was launched. It aims to comprehensively develop elite Chinese universities into world-class institutions by improving their faculty departments to world-class level by the end of 2050. During the general secretaryship of Xi Jinping, universities in the country have increasingly come under the direct management of a CCP committee secretary.

== History ==
The traditional Chinese education system is based on legalist and Confucian ideals. The teaching of Confucius has shaped the overall Chinese mindset for over two millennia. However, other outside forces have also played a large role in the nation's educational development. The First Opium War of 1840, for example, opened China to the rest of the world; as a result, Chinese intellectuals discovered numerous western advances in science and technology, which greatly impacted the higher education system and curriculum in China.

Tianjin University was established in 1895 and became the first modern university in China. The university was established in October 1895 as Imperial Tientsin University (天津北洋西學學堂) by a royal charter of the Guangxu Emperor of Qing dynasty. It was the first government-run university in modern China where western science and technology was its main focus, and Sheng Xuanhuai was its first president. Later, the university was renamed to Peiyang University. The school motto was "Seeking truth from facts" ("实事求是"). In 1951, followed by an order of the Chinese Communist government, the university was renamed Tianjin University and became one of the largest multidisciplinary engineering universities in China and one of the first 16 national key universities accredited by the nation in 1959.

Peking University, established in 1898, is the second modern university of China. It was founded as Imperial Peking University (京師大學堂) in 1898 in Beijing as a replacement of the ancient Guozijian (國子監), the national central institute of learning in China's traditional educational system.

Soviet influence in the early 1950s eventually brought all higher education under government leadership. Research was separated from teaching. The government also introduced a central plan for a nationally unified instruction system, i.e. texts, syllabi, etc.; the impact of this shift can still be seen today insofar as Chinese higher education continues its struggle with excessive departmentalization, segmentation, and overspecialization.

From 1967 to 1976, China's Cultural Revolution took another toll on higher education, which was devastated more than any other sector of society. In China, the enrollment of college students dropped from 674,400 to 47,800. In 1977, Deng Xiaoping made the decision of resuming the National Higher Education Entrance Examination (Gaokao). The first group that was admitted to college after the 11-year suspension of the Gaokao consisted of 273,000 students, known as the Class of 1977. From then on, Chinese higher education underwent a series of reforms, partly due to the government's argument that schools in the status quo had lacked the flexibility and autonomy to provide education according to the needs of the society. Structural reform of higher education consists of five parts:

- reforms of education provision
- management
- investment
- recruitment and job-placement
- inner-institute management

The reforms were implemented with the intention of providing higher education institutions more autonomy, as well as the ability to better meet the needs of students. Instead of micromanagement, the state has intended to provide general planning. The Provisional Regulations Concerning the Management of Institutions of Higher Learning, promulgated by the State Council in 1986, led to a number of changes in both administration and educational opportunities. Reform allowed universities and colleges to:

- choose their own teaching plans and curricula
- accept projects from or cooperate with other socialist establishments for scientific research and technical development in setting up "combines" involving teaching, scientific research, and production
- suggest appointments and removals of vice presidents and other staff members
- take charge of the distribution of capital construction investment and funds allocated by the state
- be responsible for the development of international exchanges by using their own funds

Initiatives continued through the 1990s. In order to adapt to global competition in education, the Ministry of Education of the People's Republic of China initiated Project 211 to strengthen approximately 100 institutions of higher education and key disciplinary areas as a national priority for the 21st century. Later, on May 4, 1998, General Secretary of the Chinese Communist Party Jiang Zemin declared that "China must have a number of first-rate universities of international advanced level", after which Project 985 was launched. Project 985's aim was to promote China's educational competitiveness and establish a number of leading disciplines in the world.

Reforms continued through 2000, with the state aiming to complete the reform of 200 universities operating under China's ministries and start 15 university-based scientific technology parks.

=== Double First-Class Construction universities ===
In October 2015, The State Council of the People's Republic of China published the "Overall Plan for Promoting the Construction of World First Class Universities and First Class Disciplines" (also known as the "Overall Plan for Double First-Class Construction"). The plan aims to comprehensively develop elite Chinese universities into world-class institutions by building and strengthening their disciplines and faculties; it eventually aims to develop all the included universities into "world-first-class" universities by 2050, making new arrangements for the development of higher education in China. The Double First-Class Construction has presented a new means of ranking universities in China, replacing previous projects such as Project 211, Project 985, or Project Characteristic Key Disciplines.

In September 2017, the full list of the Double First-Class Construction universities and disciplines was published by the Ministry of Education of China, the Ministry of Finance of China, and the National Development and Reform Commission of China. It includes 140 elite Chinese universities (less than 5% of the higher education institutions in China).

On September 18, 2020, the members of a Chinese expert group, which was headed by Lin Huiqing, Chairman of the Medical Education Expert Committee of the Ministry of Education and former Vice Minister of the Ministry of Education, unanimously agreed that Tsinghua University has been fully established as a world-class university.

== Present day ==
In 2025, the Ministry of Education (MOE) reported that there were 3,119 higher education institutions (HEIs) across the country. 1,257 were regular HEIs (including 154 independent colleges), 51 undergraduate vocational schools, 1,562 higher vocational (technical) schools, and 249 adult higher education institutions. There are also 233 research institutes that train postgraduates. The MOE also reported 48.46 million students enrolled in higher education.

In China, according to ownership-based categories of HEIs, the higher education can be divided into two categories: state-owned or government-owned HEIs. This division includes regular HEIs, independent institutions, higher vocational colleges, adult HEIs, and non-government or private universities. Regular HEIs are considered the cornerstone in China's higher education, but the development of private universities has not been trivial.

For college students, there are 13 statutory types of academic degrees awardable in China: Bachelor/Master/Doctor of Philosophy, Economics, Law, Education, Literature, History, Science, Engineering, Agriculture, Medicine, Management, Military Science, and Fine Arts. These degree names are designated both by the degree program's academic emphasis and the classification of disciplines.

== Rankings ==
The Ministry of Education of China does not advocate, support, or recognize any ranking published by other institutions. Nonetheless, the quality of universities and higher education in China is internationally recognized, as China has established educational cooperation and exchanges with 188 countries and regions and 46 major international organizations. China has signed agreements with 54 countries such as the U.S., Great Britain, Germany, Australia, and Canada for mutual recognition of higher education qualifications and academic degrees.

In 2017, China surpassed the U.S. with the highest number of scientific publications. As of 2025, there were 2 Chinese universities in the global top 20, 5 in the top 50, and 19 in the top 200, behind only the United States and the United Kingdom in terms of the overall representation in the Aggregate Ranking of Top Universities, a composite ranking system combining three of the world's most influential university rankings (ARWU+QS+ THE). China has dominated the QS BRICS University Rankings and the THE's Emerging Economies University Rankings, claiming seven of the top 10 spots for both rankings. China is the most-represented nation overall.

As of 2025, China tops the QS Asia University Rankings list with over 146 universities including in the ranking, and seven Chinese universities appear in the Asia Top 10, which is more than any other country. As of 2023, China topped the list for the first time for the Academic Ranking of World Universities (ARWU) and the U.S. News & World Report Best Global Universities Ranking 2022–2023, two of the four most observed global university rankings apart from the QS and THE.

According to THE China Subject Ratings 2020 conducted by the Time Higher Education World University Rankings, Chinese universities are on a par with their counterparts in the U.S., the U.K., and Germany across 89 subjects, putting them ahead of others in countries like France, South Korea, and Russia. The country scores above the global average of a B score, with 46 percent of its universities' grades placing at A+, A, or A−, thus placing it only slightly behind the U.S. at 49 percent.

The QS rankings by subjects 2021 indicated that universities in China had a record number in the top 50 universities in the world across all 51 subjects in five broad discipline areas: "Arts and Humanities", "Natural Sciences", "Social Sciences and Management", "Engineering & Technology", and "Life Sciences and Medicines". In 2020, five Chinese universities appeared in the global top 10 for number of international patent applications via the World Intellectual Property Organization (WIPO)—more than any country.

== Admission ==
The Gaokao (高考), also known as the National College Entrance Examination (NCEE) and the Nationwide Unified Examination for Admissions to General Universities and Colleges, is the annual nationally-coordinated provincially-administered undergraduate admission exam in mainland China, starting on June 7 and ending on different dates across provinces, with the latest closing on June 10. Despite the name, the exam is conducted at the provincial level, with variations determined by provincial governments, under the central coordination of the Ministry of Education of China.

== Academic freedom ==
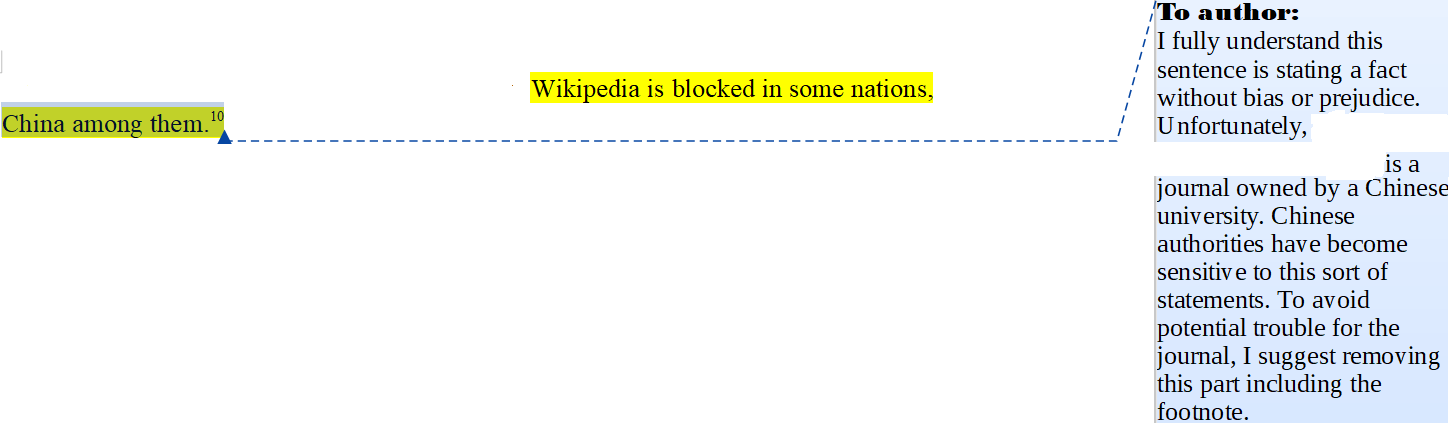
Self-censorship in a Chinese academic journal: an editor asks the article's author to remove a sentence about blocking of Wikipedia in mainland China as it could cause trouble with the "authorities".

Academic freedom is severely limited in China. Academics have noted an incentive not to express 'incorrect' opinions about issues sensitive to the Government of China and the ruling Chinese Communist Party (CCP). These efforts have been effective in causing academics to self-censor and shift academic discourse.

During the general secretaryship of Xi Jinping, universities in the country have increasingly been put under the direct management of a CCP committee secretary and have intensified ideological controls. In December 2020, the Associated Press reported that China was controlling scientific research into the origins of COVID-19 under direct orders from CCP general secretary Xi Jinping. According to the report, an order by China's State Council required all research to be approved by a task force under their management, saying scientific publication should be orchestrated like "a game of chess", warning that those who publish without permission will be held accountable.

According to National Public Radio, from 2013 to 2017, at least 109 universities in China issued their first charters affirming the CCP leadership. In 2020, Shanghai's Fudan University removed freedom of thought from its charter following the December 2019 revision of the school charter to emphasize loyalty to the CCP.

Hong Kong academia expressed concerns about the impact of the 2020 Hong Kong National Security Law on academic freedom in Hong Kong. As of 2025, it ranked in the bottom 20% worldwide for academic freedom according to the Academic Freedom Index.

In an August 2021 study, Jue Jiang from the University of London argued that academic freedom in China is impaired by the CCP's system of student informants, who are recruited and encouraged to watch and inform on their professors on university campuses.

== International students ==
With China's rising national strength and popularity of Chinese in the world, China as a study destination attracts thousands of foreign students abroad, and the number of foreign students continues to grow rapidly in recent years. Since 2005, China has become the most popular country in Asia and the sixth largest country in the world in hosting international students. The top ten countries with students studying in China include South Korea, Japan, the U.S., Vietnam, Thailand, Russia, India, Indonesia, France, and Pakistan.

According to 2014 data from Ministry of Education of the People's Republic of China, there were more than 377,054 foreign students from 203 countries or regions studying across the 31 provinces in China—an increase of 5.77% over the same period last year. In 2015, a record breaking 397,635 international students went to China, solidifying its position as the third most popular destination country after only the UK and the US for overseas students. While U.S. and the U.K. attracted nearly one-third of all globally mobile students, their leadership has been contested by the "Third Wave" of political turbulence and intense competition from English-medium instruction or English-taught programs in countries like China, as well as those in continental Europe.

In 2014, the largest source of foreign students came from Asia, accounting for almost 60% of the total, followed by Europe with 18% and Africa with 11%. Among individual countries, the top three countries of origin were South Korea (62,923), United States (24,203), and Thailand (21,296). Only 10% of foreign students receive scholarships from the Chinese government; the remaining 90% are self-funded.

In 2018, according to the most recent statistics from the Ministry of Education, China (hosting 492,185 international students in 2018) has overtaken the U.K. (hosting 458,520 international students in 2018), thus hosting the second largest international students population after the U.S. In 2018, international students have enrolled in over 1004 institutions of higher education in China.

== Study abroad ==
From 2010 to 2019, the number of Chinese students studying abroad grew at an average annual rate of 9.5%. However, the number dropped significantly during the COVID-19 pandemic, decreasing by 36%, and has not recovered to pre-pandemic levels as of 2023. The top five countries with Chinese students as of 2023 are the United States, the United Kingdom, Australia, Canada and Japan; all except the UK have seen a decline in the number of Chinese students. Though studying abroad has previously been associated with higher wages after returning to China, this has become less true in the 2020s. From 2019 to 2025, the number of Chinese students abroad dropped from 703,500 to 570,600.

== Challenges ==
Between 2002 and 2020, the percentage of young adults holding a higher diploma increased from 15% to 54%. This has led to increases in graduate unemployment, underemployment, and overqualification, as well as credentialism and educational inflation.

As a result, educators, students, and the Ministry of Education have promoted training in skills for the market economy that would complement higher education. Specifically, in Chinese universities, students clubs and special training activities aim to cultivate soft skills in students, thus promoting resilient personalities and life skills in preparation for the uncertainties in the job market. While the total number of enrollments in Chinese higher education institutions has been expanding for years, the unemployment rate among young people has also still been increasing.

Additionally, as of 2013, Chinese university teachers have had low job satisfaction, showing emotional exhaustion and dissatisfaction with the current personnel system.

== See also ==
- Academic ranks in China
- Double First-Class Construction
- State Key Laboratory
- Project 985
- Project 211
- Plan 111
- C9 League
- Academic Ranking of World Universities compiled by Shanghai Jiao Tong University
- Ant Tribes, college graduates challenges launching their career
- CERNET
- College and university rankings
- Education in China
- History of science and technology in China
- List of universities in China
- Thousand Talents Program
- Changjiang (Yangtze River) Scholar award
- Class of 1977 (China)
- Class of 1977-1978 (China)

== Notes and references ==
Footnotes

Citations
