= Sang (Chinese sub-culture) =

Chinese youth subculture

Sang (simplified Chinese: 丧; traditional Chinese: 喪, lit. 'funeral, mourning') is a term used to describe a Chinese youth sub-culture in which some young Chinese are seen to possess feelings of loss or even defeatism. Memes representing this view are widely shared reflecting feelings of disenchantment with the official discourse in post-reform China. It is in a sense an opposite of the more official zheng nengliang or positive energy.

== See also ==
- Tang ping
