= Gaokao =

Undergraduate admission exam of China

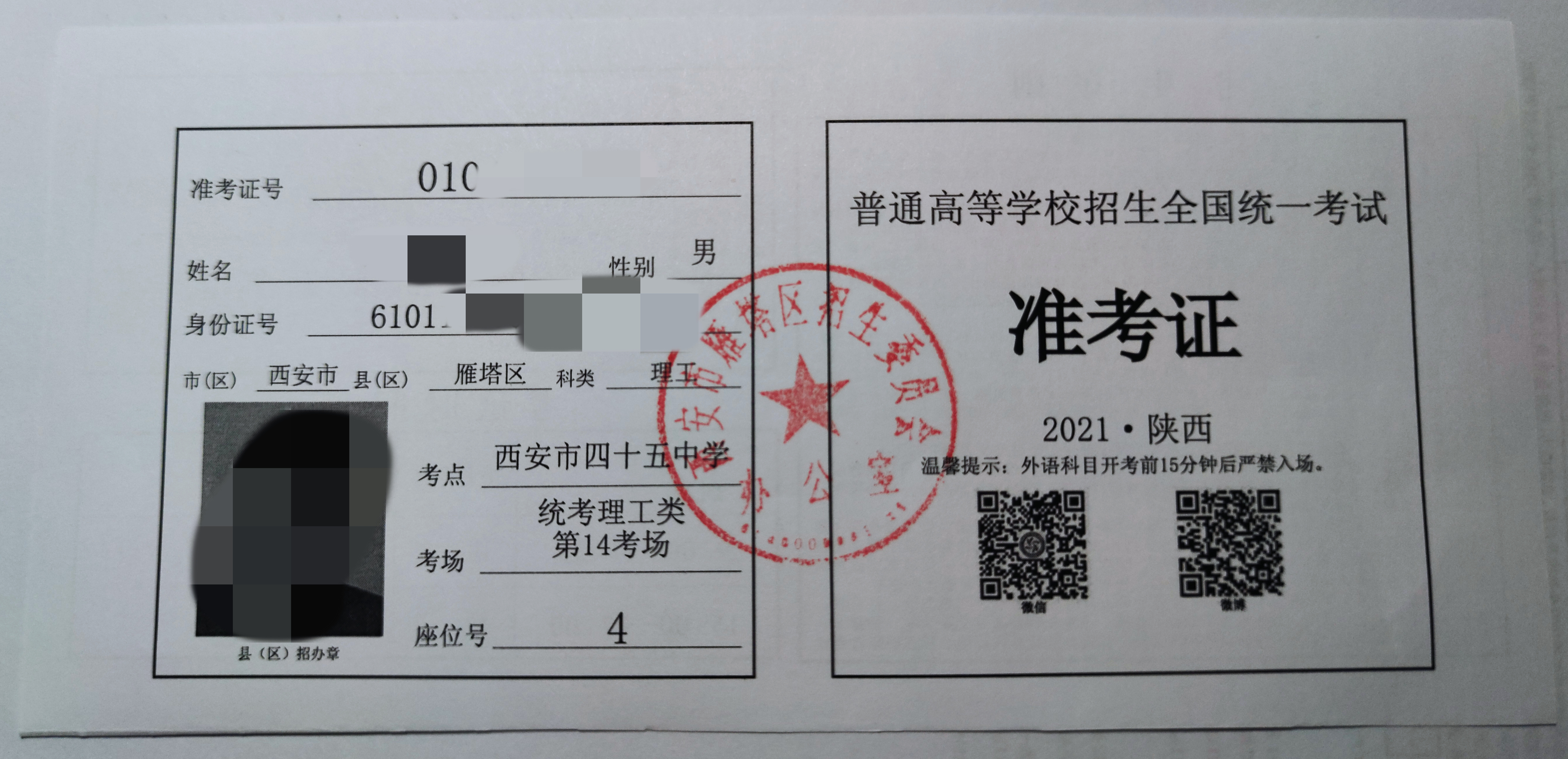
- Gaokao admission card issued by Shaanxi in 2021
- Type: Paper-based admission exam
- Administrator: Ministry of Education
- Purpose: Enrolling students in general universities and colleges
- Year started: 1952; 1977 (resumed)
- Year terminated: 1966
- Duration: Varied by subjects
- Score range: 750 points (660 in Shanghai; 900 in Hainan)
- Offered: Once a year regularly
- Regions: Mainland China
- Languages: Mainly Simplified Chinese (foreign language subjects and minority languages exam papers are also available)
- Annual number of test takers: ▼12.9 million (2026)
- Prerequisites: High school graduates and social candidates with equivalent academic qualifications
- Fee: Varied by regions
- Used by: All general universities and colleges in mainland China; some universities and colleges outside mainland China are also accepted

Gaokao
- Chinese: 高考
- Literal meaning: High Exam
Transcriptions
Standard Mandarin
- Hanyu Pinyin: Gāokǎo
- Bopomofo: ㄍㄠ ㄎㄠˇ
- Wade–Giles: Kao^{1}-k'ao^{3}
- Tongyong Pinyin: Gao-kǎo
- IPA: [káʊ.kʰàʊ]

National College Entrance Examination
- Simplified Chinese: 普通高等学校招生全国统一考试
- Traditional Chinese: 普通高等學校招生全國統一考試
- Literal meaning: Standard college enrollment nationwide unified examination
Transcriptions
Standard Mandarin
- Hanyu Pinyin: Pǔtōng gāoděng xuéxiào zhāoshēng quánguó tǒngyī kǎoshì
- Bopomofo: ㄆㄨˇ ㄊㄨㄥ ㄍㄠ ㄉㄥˇ ㄒㄩㄝˊ ㄒㄧㄠˋ ㄓㄠ ㄕㄥ ㄑㄩㄢˊ ㄍㄨㄛˊ ㄊㄨㄥˇ ㄧ ㄎㄠˇ ㄕˋ
- Wade–Giles: P'u^{3}-t'ung^{1} kao^{1}-teng^{3} hsüeh^{2}-hsiao^{4} chao^{1}-sheng^{1}-kuo^{2} t'ung^{3}-i^{1} k'ao^{3}-shih^{4}
- Tongyong Pinyin: Pǔ-tong gao-děng syué-siào jhao-sheng cyuán-guó tǒng-yi kǎo-shìh
- IPA: [pʰù.tʰʊ́ŋ káʊ.tə̀ŋ ɕɥě.ɕjâʊ ʈʂáʊ.ʂə́ŋ tɕʰɥɛ̌n.kwǒ tʰʊ̀ŋ]
other Mandarin
- Dungan: Путуң гаудəəң школа жаушəң цууангуй тонйи экзамен
Yue: Cantonese
- Yale Romanization: Póu tūng gōu dáng hohk haauh jīu sāang chyùhn gwok túng yāt háau si
- Jyutping: pou2 tung1 gou1 dang2 hok6 haau6 ziu1 saang1 cyun4 gwok3 tung2 jat1 haau2 si3
- IPA: [pʰɔw˧˥ tʰʊŋ˥ kɔw˥ tɐŋ˧˥ hɔk̚˨ haw˨ tsiw˥ saŋ˥ tsʰyn˩ kʷɔk̚ tʰ]
Southern Min
- Hokkien POJ: Phó͘-thong Ko-téng Ha̍k-hāu Chiau-seng Choân-kok Thóng-it Khó-chhì
- Hainanese Romanization: pu2 hong1 gao1 ddeng3 o5 hhiao5 ziao1 de1 suan2 gog7 hong3 id7 hao3 si4
Eastern Min
- Fuzhou BUC: Pū-tŭng Gŏ̤-dēng Hŏk-hâu Ciĕu-sĕng Cuòng-guók Tūng-ék Kō̤-sé̤ṳ
Pu-Xian Min
- Hinghwa BUC: Pô-to̤ng Go̤-dêng Ha̍h-hāu Ca̤u-seng Cé̤ⁿ-go̤h Tô̤ng-ih Kô̤-si̍
Northern Min
- Jian'ou Romanized: Pǔ-tó̤ng Ǎu-dǎing Hă-hāu Ciáu-sáing Cṳ̌ing-gŏ Tǒ̤ng-ĭ Kǎu-si̿

The Gaokao (Chinese: 高考; pinyin: Gāokǎo), also known as the National College Entrance Examination (NCEE) and the Nationwide Unified Examination for Admissions to General Universities and Colleges, is the annual nationally-coordinated provincially-administered undergraduate admission exam in China, starting on 7 June and ending on different dates across provinces, with the latest closing on 10 June. Despite the name, the exam is conducted at the provincial level, with variations determined by provincial governments, under the central coordination of the Ministry of Education.

The Gaokao is required for undergraduate admissions to all higher education institutions in the country. It is taken by graduating high school students at the end of their final academic year.

== History ==
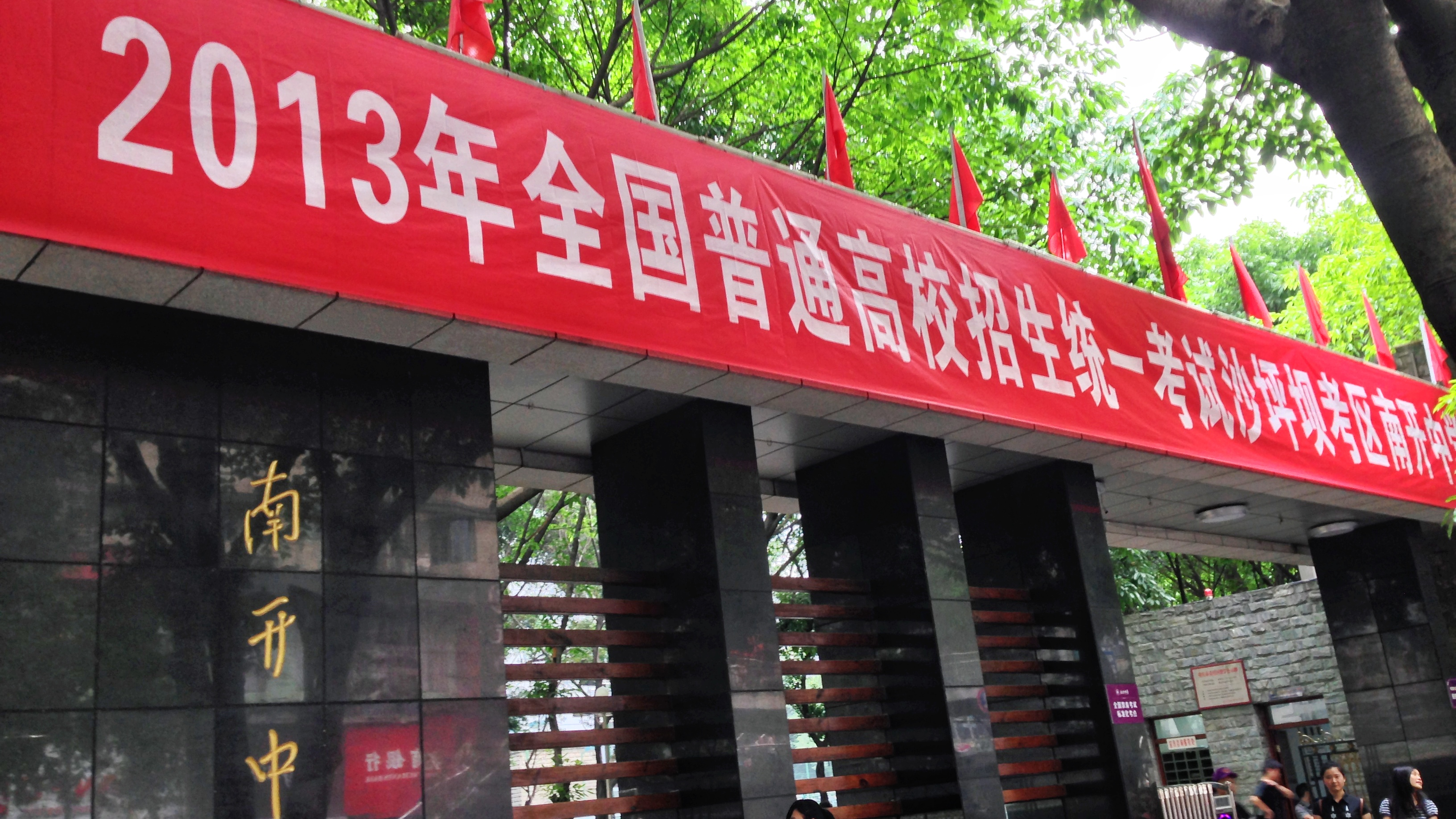
A 2013 banner at Chongqing Nankai Secondary School announcing it as an examination venue for the 2013 Gaokao

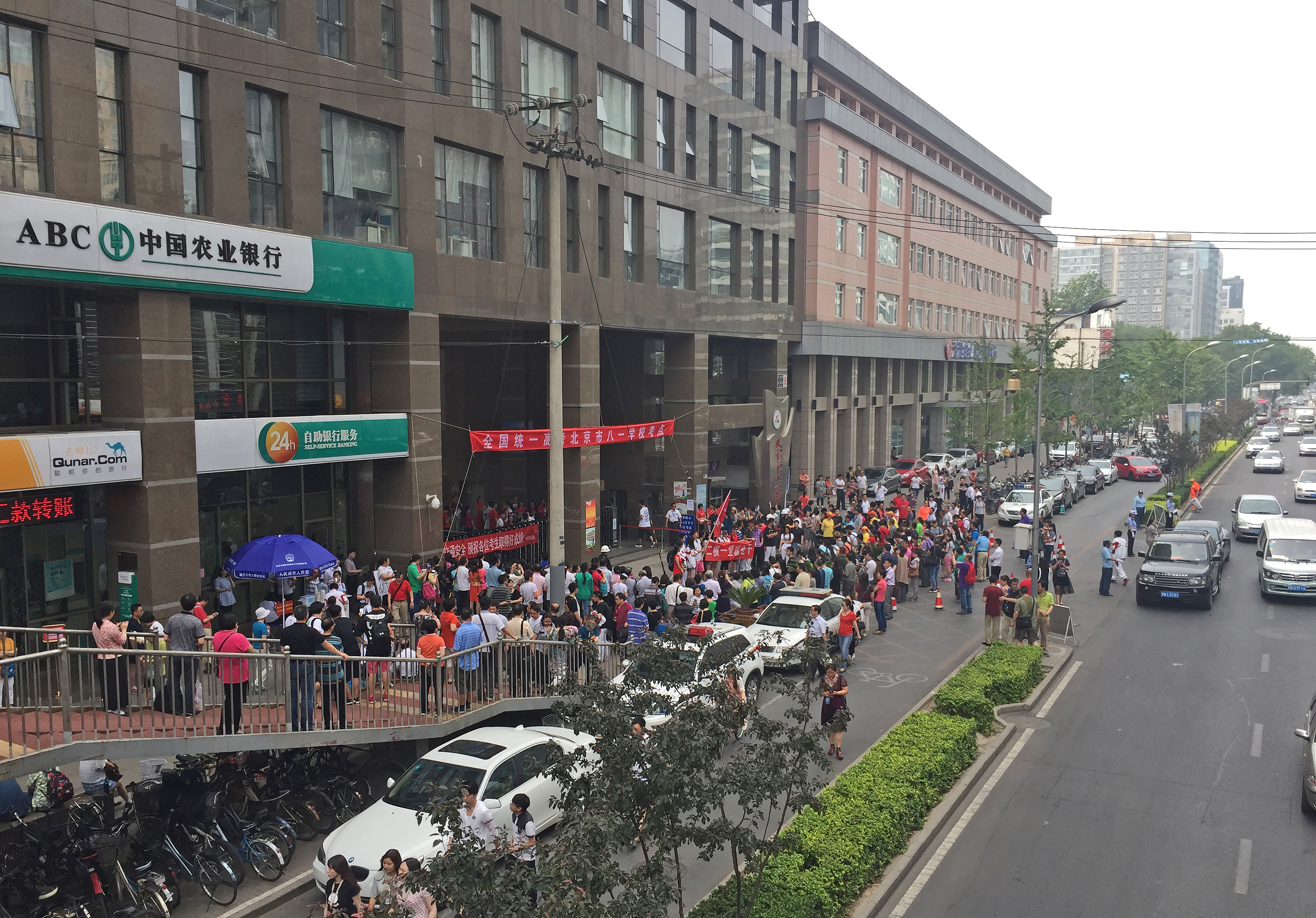
Parents and teachers outside Beijing Bayi School during the 2016 National College Entrance Examination

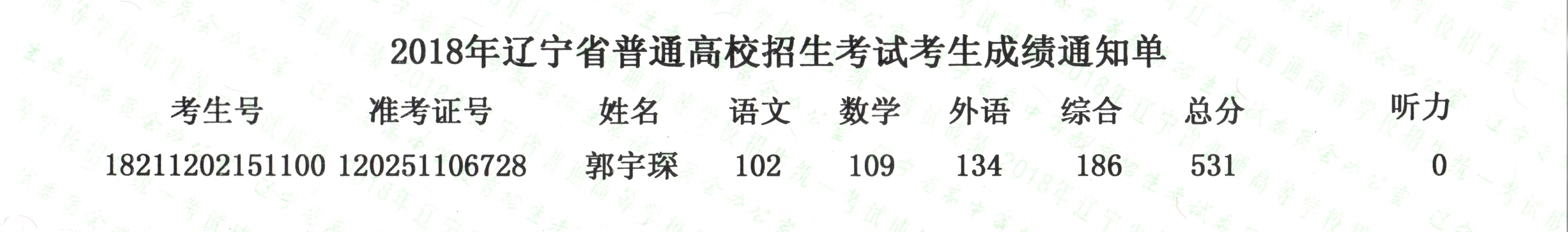
Results as issued in Liaoning Province in 2018

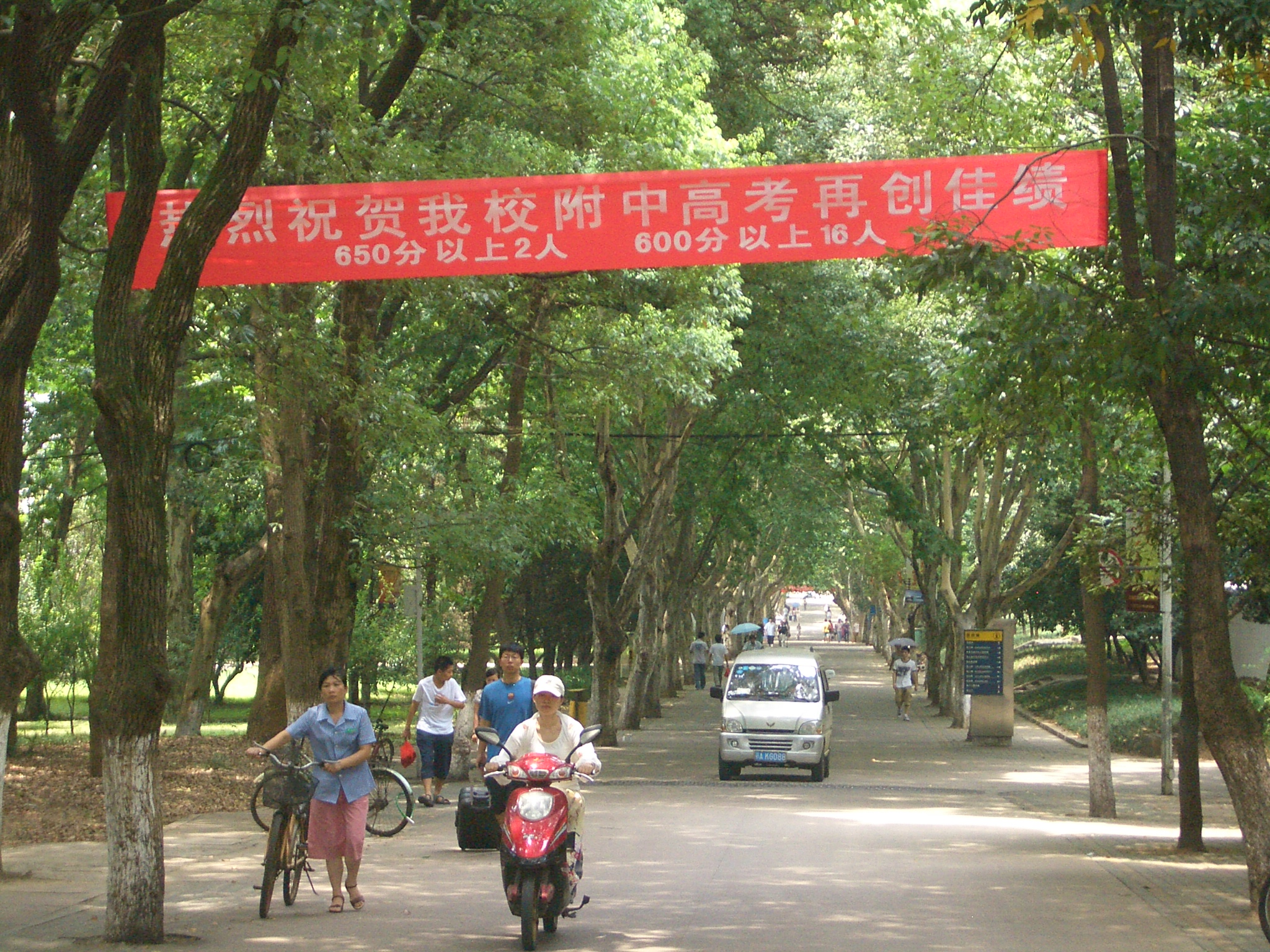
A banner on the HUST campus in Wuhan congratulates top exam score achievers from the university-affiliated high school

=== Background ===
The first Gaokao was held on 15–17 August 1952.

The Nationwide Unified Examination for Admissions to General Universities and Colleges marked the start of the reform of National Matriculation Tests Policies (NMTP), or the Gaokao, in the newly established People's Republic of China. With the implementation of the first Five Year Plan in 1953, the Gaokao was further enhanced. After repeated discussions and experiments, the Gaokao was eventually set as a fundamental policy system in 1959. From 1958, the tertiary entrance examination system was affected by the Great Leap Forward Movement. Unified recruitment was soon replaced by separate recruitment by individual or allied tertiary education institutions. Meanwhile, political censorship on candidate students was enhanced. From 1962, the Gaokao system was criticized due to its negative impact on the working class; in July 1966, the Gaokao was officially canceled and substituted with a new admission policy of recommending workers, farmers and soldiers to college. During the next ten years, the Down to the Countryside Movement, initiated by Chairman of the Chinese Communist Party Mao Zedong, forced both senior and junior secondary school graduates, the so-called "educated youth", to work as farmers in countryside villages. Against the backdrop of world revolution, about 17 million such young people joined the ranks of farmers, working and living alongside them.

In the early 1970s, Chairman Mao reinstated university operations. However, new students were selected through evaluation by a revolutionary committee rather than through formal academic scores. This practice continued until the death of Mao in September 1976. In late 1977, Deng Xiaoping, then under Hua Guofeng, the heir apparent of Mao, officially resumed traditional examinations based on academics, the Gaokao, which has continued to the present day. The Gaokao has been an important part of university admissions since its reintroduction in 1977, representing meritocracy in contemporary China.

The first such examination after the Cultural Revolution took place in late 1977.

In 1992, the history of the Chinese Communist Party was added to the scope of the Gaokao.

After 2022, some provinces have instituted reforms to remove extra points for ethnic minorities and students who participated in athletic and extra-scholar activities. The changes have been gradually rolled out to 5 different groups of provinces, and have been finally implemented completely as of 2025.

=== 2006 Gaokao ===
In 2006, a record high of 9.5 million people applied for tertiary education entry in China. Of these, 8.8 million (93%) took the Gaokao and 27,600 (0.28%) were exempted (保送) as these students demonstrated exceptional merit in the quality of their work and understanding of the academic subjects. Out of the 9.5 million applicants, 5,460,500 (57.48%) were admitted to universities or colleges. Everyone else (700,000 students) took other standardized entrance exams, such as those designed for adult education students.

=== 2017 Gaokao ===
In 2017, 9.40 million students took the Gaokao, 7 million of whom were admitted into colleges or universities. The percentage of first-class admission (Yi Ben; 一本), considered to be good universities in China, varied from 9.48% to 30.5%, with the lowest admission rates in Henan province and Shanxi province, at less than 10%.

Below are the changes of the exam scope from 2016 to 2017 (in most areas of China, where the students use the Nationwide Exam Papers in Gaokao):

Yuwen

- All the exam contents are set into compulsory examination scope.

Mathematics

- Elective Course 4–1 (Selection of Geometric Proof) is removed from the elective examination scope.

Foreign Language

- No changes.

Physics

- Elective Course 3–5 is changed from the elective examination scope into the compulsory examination scope.

Chemistry

- Elective Course 2 (Chemistry and Technology) is removed from the elective examination scope.

Biology

- Topic 3 (Tissue Culture Technology of Plants) is removed from the elective examination scope of Elective Course 1 (Biotechnology Practice).

Political Science

- No changes.

History

- Elective Course 2 (Democratic Thought and Practice in Modern Society) is removed from the elective examination scope.

Geography

- Elective Course 5 (Natural Disasters and Prevention) is removed from the elective examination scope.

=== 2018 Gaokao ===
9.75 million students attended Gaokao on 7–8 June with 7,909,900 (or 81.13% of the total attending students) being successful in being admitted to colleges or universities.

=== 2020–2022 COVID‑19 postponements ===
On 31 March 2020, China's Ministry of Education announced that the 2020 Gaokao would be postponed by one month, moving the national dates to 7–8 July because of the COVID-19 pandemic in mainland China. Students took the rescheduled exams under epidemic prevention measures such as temperature checks, mask wearing, and staggered entry.

Although the exam returned to its usual early‑June slot in 2021, Shanghai deferred its local sitting of the 2022 Gaokao to 7–9 July after a citywide outbreak—the first such delay since 2020. 2022 saw a record 11.93 million registrations nationwide, representing an increase of 1.15 million people compared to 2021.

=== Acceptance rate for each year ===
The number of higher education institutes in the People's Republic of China has risen annually since 1977. From 1999 to 2020, the number of institutes increased dramatically from 1,071 to 2,740, which significantly contributed to the rapid growth in the number of NCEE examinees and accepted students.

Annual acceptance rate
Year	Number of examinees	Accepted students	Acceptance rate
1977	5,700,000	270,000	5.19%
1978	6,100,000	402,000	6.59%
1979	4,680,000	280,000	5.98%
1980	3,330,000	280,000	8.41%
1981	2,590,000	280,000	10.81%
1982	1,870,000	320,000	17.11%
1983	1,670,000	390,000	23.35%
1984	1,640,000	480,000	29.27%
1985	1,760,000	620,000	35.23%
1986	1,910,000	570,000	29.84%
1987	2,280,000	620,000	27.19%
1988	2,720,000	670,000	24.63%
1989	2,660,000	600,000	22.56%
1990	2,830,000	610,000	21.55%
1991	2,960,000	620,000	20.95%
1992	3,030,000	750,000	24.75%
1993	2,860,000	980,000	34.27%
1994	2,510,000	900,000	35.86%
1995	2,530,000	930,000	36.76%
1996	2,410,000	970,000	40.25%
1997	2,780,000	1,000,000	35.97%
1998	3,200,000	1,083,600	33.86%
1999	2,880,000	1,596,800	55.44%
2000	3,750,000	2,206,100	58.83%
2001	4,540,000	2,682,800	59.09%
2002	5,100,000	3,205,000	62.84%
2003	6,130,000	3,821,700	62.34%
2004	7,290,000	4,473,400	61.36%
2005	8,770,000	5,044,600	57.52%
2006	9,500,000	5,460,500	57.48%
2007	10,100,000	5,659,200	56.03%
2008	10,500,000	6,076,600	57.87%
2009	10,200,000	6,394,900	62.70%
2010	9,460,000	6,617,600	69.95%
2011	9,330,000	6,815,000	73.04%
2012	9,150,000	6,888,300	75.28%
2013	9,120,000	6,998,300	76.74%
2014	9,390,000	7,214,000	76.83%
2015	9,420,000	7,378,500	78.33%
2016	9,400,000	7,486,100	79.64%
2017	9,400,000	7,614,900	81.01%
2018	9,750,000	7,909,900	81.13%
2019	10,310,000	9,149,000	88.74%
2020	10,710,000	9,675,000	90.34%
2021	10,780,000	10,013,200	92.89%
2022	11,930,000	10,145,400	85.04%
2023	12,910,000	10,422,200	80.73%
2024	13,420,000	10,689,000	79.65%
2025	13,350,000	–	–
2026	12,900,000	–	–

Annual number of examinees by province
Province	Chinese	2023	2022	2021	2020	2019	2018	2017	2016	2015	2014	2013	2012	2011	2010	2009	2008	2007	2006	2005	2004	2003	2002	2001	2000	1999
Beijing	北京	58,000	54,728	51,738	49,225	59,209	63,073	60,638	61,222	68,000	70,500	72,736	73,000	76,000	81,000	88,192	103,789	109,876	110,259	98,745	85,073	81,266	71,808	64,479	56,000	–
Tianjin	天津	68,000	58,000	56,000	56,300	56,000	55,074	57,015	60,000	61,990	60,000	63,000	64,000	64,600	71,000	76,500	88,500	88,500	83,600	73,836	67,000	59,000	57,797	52,312	37,028	–
Hebei	河北	862,000	753,200	634,000	624,800	559,600	486,400	436,200	423,100	404,800	418,200	449,800	459,300	485,000	503,000	559,000	574,800	561,800	557,600	483,000	389,535	337,000	302,000	–	–	–
Shanxi	山西	344,700	337,000	315,700	326,000	314,000	305,071	317,000	339,131	342,278	341,600	358,000	361,000	339,000	362,000	360,000	370,000	331,000	320,000	297,288	247,858	210,114	171,717	–	–	–
Inner Mongolia	内蒙古	211,672	185,000	184,700	197,901	199,000	195,000	198,697	201,131	189,500	188,000	193,267	189,500	205,600	219,000	246,000	270,000	239,000	200,000	200,000	186,743	166,457	137,129	–	–	–
Liaoning	辽宁	195,882	207,706	191,000	218,152	244,000	185,000	208,502	218,252	225,191	239,000	254,000	256,000	245,000	243,500	280,000	300,000	290,000	270,000	247,000	205,123	176,000	186,480	160,000	–	–
Jilin	吉林	141,000	150,000	152,412	150,000	162,787	150,239	142,900	148,500	137,681	160,200	159,000	162,000	165,000	169,000	197,000	208,000	201,000	172,000	160,000	124,796	118,866	109,224	–	–	–
Heilongjiang	黑龙江	191,000	182,900	165,000	183,000	204,000	190,424	188,000	197,000	198,000	204,000	208,000	210,000	208,000	195,000	230,000	228,000	224,000	219,200	201,130	173,100	159,800	150,400	120,000	–	–
Shanghai	上海	59,824	50,000	50,000	50,000	50,000	50,000	51,000	51,000	51,000	52,000	53,000	55,000	61,000	67,000	83,000	108,000	110,452	113,800	112,000	110,000	91,922	93,900	91,200	–	–
Jiangsu	江苏	445,000	406,000	359,000	348,900	339,000	331,500	330,100	360,400	392,900	425,700	451,000	475,000	500,000	527,000	546,000	508,000	530,000	495,000	480,000	405,000	341,410	289,400	290,731	249,420	210,000
Zhejiang	浙江	390,900	365,000	332,400	325,700	325,100	306,000	291,300	307,400	280,000	308,600	313,000	315,800	299,000	300,800	348,500	364,400	358,800	352,000	313,000	250,000	229,000	205,900	179,000	–	–
Anhui	安徽	647,000	601,000	542,500	523,800	513,000	499,000	498,600	509,900	546,000	527,000	511,000	506,000	540,000	562,000	572,000	610,000	564,000	463,500	417,000	346,885	292,106	242,530	201,300	185,677	–
Fujian	福建	232,000	218,000	201,000	202,600	207,800	200,927	188,200	175,000	189,300	255,000	255,000	250,000	267,000	292,000	305,000	312,000	309,300	250,000	256,800	220,000	204,588	167,264	–	–	–
Jiangxi	江西	628,000	574,800	493,000	462,000	421,300	380,000	364,900	360,600	354,641	325,000	274,300	269,000	288,600	312,000	350,000	384,493	384,292	350,000	316,667	278,298	205,389	165,951	150,885	124,737	–
Shandong	山东	980,000	867,000	795,000	782,000	756,000	760,000	720,000	710,000	696,198	658,106	589,701	648,671	692,309	778,405	826,761	943,522	917,033	943,522	862,339	668,316	624,773	532,034	–	–	–
Henan	河南	1,500,000	1,300,000	1,046,000	1,158,000	1,084,000	983,800	865,800	820,000	772,000	724,000	758,000	805,000	855,000	952,400	959,000	905,000	878,847	780,000	719,970	595,537	498,000	354,000	291,000	–	–
Hubei	湖北	501,091	464,646	405,000	394,800	384,000	374,302	362,000	361,478	368,425	402,700	438,000	457,000	484,700	492,000	519,500	525,000	503,300	533,000	460,500	372,000	330,000	288,000	228,842	–	–
Hunan	湖南	684,000	655,000	574,900	537,000	499,000	451,800	410,800	401,600	390,000	378,000	373,000	352,000	372,000	413,000	507,000	540,000	518,782	480,000	425,000	349,000	299,104	258,100	218,100	–	–
Guangdong	广东	900,000	857,000	783,000	788,000	768,000	758,000	730,000	733,000	754,000	756,000	727,000	692,000	655,000	615,000	644,000	614,000	553,826	517,400	451,400	389,400	335,000	260,000	241,026	185,521	–
Guangxi	广西	650,000	610,200	550,400	507,000	470,000	400,000	365,000	330,000	310,000	315,000	298,000	285,000	292,000	299,000	302,000	304,000	300,000	274,900	255,232	216,675	185,465	156,141	128,365	–	–
Hainan	海南	70,069	63,874	60,000	57,000	60,148	58,775	57,000	60,403	62,000	61,000	56,662	55,000	54,000	54,700	57,800	49,800	42,300	41,000	45,000	34,400	–	26,265	19,596	–	–
Chongqing	重庆	341,000	314,000	289,500	283,000	264,000	250,473	247,500	248,888	255,460	250,600	235,000	230,000	216,400	196,700	196,000	186,000	177,349	190,000	160,000	130,000	95,329	81,917	62,665	–	–
Sichuan	四川	800,000	770,000	700,000	670,000	654,200	620,000	582,800	571,400	575,700	571,700	540,000	538,000	514,000	511,500	500,000	517,600	498,800	453,300	450,000	339,000	258,798	227,500	193,351	–	–
Guizhou	贵州	491,000	478,000	491,700	470,602	458,700	441,731	411,897	373,873	330,591	292,700	247,800	248,000	243,100	234,000	240,000	240,000	225,700	209,180	168,502	131,982	109,122	76,776	68,416	65,784	–
Yunnan	云南	399,300	388,300	358,000	343,200	326,100	300,296	293,467	281,071	272,126	255,900	236,000	210,000	230,000	220,000	220,000	260,000	200,000	181,400	171,824	123,321	119,956	101,358	–	79,033	–
Tibet	西藏	33,000	32,000	36,000	32,973	27,580	25,343	28,500	23,976	22,590	19,625	18,949	19,000	18,000	18,000	13,600	15,000	15,000	13,700	14,000	12,157	9,500	6,510	–	–	–
Shaanxi	陕西	336,798	323,058	312,919	322,344	325,911	319,000	319,196	328,000	344,000	353,000	366,498	375,300	383,900	378,500	405,000	414,000	411,700	373,200	–	295,941	244,707	189,250	149,200	–	–
Gansu	甘肃	247,848	243,248	245,917	263,100	266,807	273,639	284,758	296,920	303,862	297,514	283,504	295,981	297,457	290,952	286,532	290,000	272,000	249,000	207,000	163,000	136,000	115,000	87,101	–	–
Qinghai	青海	51,100	48,400	58,000	56,700	55,114	42,000	46,346	44,600	42,682	39,700	40,600	38,000	40,600	38,000	39,000	41,000	38,000	40,000	33,000	–	–	–	–	–	–
Ningxia	宁夏	71,612	65,694	69,119	60,300	71,702	69,475	69,233	69,119	67,708	64,000	58,700	60,200	60,100	57,000	58,000	58,000	56,500	50,000	–	–	41,244	30,388	30,166	–	–
Xinjiang	新疆	220,000	218,500	236,100	229,300	220,900	207,400	183,700	166,100	160,500	162,600	158,700	154,700	147,700	164,200	164,500	170,000	154,096	128,100	130,000	100,000	91,000	79,300	67,000	66,810	–

== Subjects before NCEE Reform ==
The subjects tested in the Gaokao have changed over time. Traditionally, students would undertake either a set of "art" subjects or a set of "science" subjects, with some shared compulsory subjects which were Yuwen, mathematics and a foreign language. The subjects taken in the Examination affected the degree Examination, or implemented flexible systems for selecting the subjects to be tested, resulting in a number of different systems. A multi-phased reform was announced in 2014 and was slated to be completed by 2025.

=== "3+X" system ===
As a pilot examination system used in order to promote education system reform, this examination system was implemented in most parts of the country, including Beijing, Tianjin, Hebei, Liaoning, Jilin, Heilongjiang, Anhui, Fujian, Guangdong, Jiangxi, Henan, Shandong, Hubei, Shaanxi, Sichuan, Guizhou, Yunnan, Shanxi, Chongqing, Gansu, Qinghai, Inner Mongolia, Guangxi, Ningxia, Xinjiang and Tibet. However, within the context of the reforms of the National College Entrance Examination, this program was suspended in Beijing, Tianjin, Shandong and Hainan provinces from 2020, and was to be suspended in most provinces and cities in China from 2021. It ceased across mainland China by 2022.

- "3" refers to compulsory subjects, including "Yuwen, Mathematics and a foreign language", each of which accounts for 150/750 in total score.
- "X" means that students can choose, according to their own capability, one subject from either Social Sciences (including Political Sciences, History and Geography), or Natural Sciences (including Physics, Chemistry and Biology), which accounts for 300/750 in total score.
- If a student chooses Natural Sciences, then he or she will take a relatively harder mathematics test as well, including Curves and Equations, Space Vector and Solid Geometry, The Concept of Definite Integral, Fundamental Theorem of Calculus, Simple Application of Definite Integral, Mathematical Induction, Counting Principle, Random Variable and Its Distribution.
- For candidates of minor ethnic groups in Tibet, Xinjiang, Inner Mongolia, Qinghai and Jilin, their Literature score consists of an easier Chinese Literature test and an optional subject on Tibetan, Mongolian, Uyghur and Korean Literature, each counting for 75 points.

	Compulsory Subjects	Score	Time	Elective Subjects	Score	Time
Social Sciences	Yuwen, Mathematics (for arts students) and a foreign language	450/750, 150 each	150 minutes for Yuwen (9:00 to 11:30 on 7 June), 120 minutes for Mathematics (15:00 to 17:00 on 7 June) and the foreign language (15:00 to 17:00 on 8 June)	Political Science, History, and Geography	300/750, 100+100+100	150 minutes (9:00 to 11:30 on 8 June)
Natural Sciences	Yuwen, Mathematics and a foreign language	450/750, 150 each	150 minutes for Yuwen (9:00 to 11:30 on 7 June), 120 minutes for Mathematics (15:00 to 17:00 on 7 June) and the foreign language (15:00 to 17:00 on 8 June)	Physics, Chemistry, and Biology	300/750, 110+100+90	150 minutes (9:00 to 11:30 on 8 June)

=== Region specific ===
==== "3+X+Y" system ====
The system was used in Zhejiang Province, with the last exam offered in 2016 to "Class-of-2013" (2013级, meaning admitted to senior high school in 2013, i.e., being Grade 10 in 2013) while "Class-of-2014" students have been taking the reformed version of Gaokao since 2017.

The "3" and "X" are the same as the national "3+X" system, weighed at 750 points. The "Y" part consists of 18 questions, covering 9 subjects (Yuwen, Maths, English, Physics, Chemistry, Biology, History, Political Science, and Geography), from which students need to choose 6 questions to answer, weighed at 60 points. The total score is 810 points.

==== "3+2" system ====
This system used to be employed in Jiangsu Province, but was replaced by another system in 2020. The total score was 480 points.

- "3" refers to three compulsory subjects "Yuwen, mathematics, and a foreign language", which are recorded in the total score.
- "2" refers to selecting two subjects either from Political Science, History or Geography for art students, or from Biology, Chemistry or Physics for science students, which are not recorded in total score but a class like A, B, etc. will be recorded.
- Bonus Points: refers to 4 comprehensive science or liberal arts exams, one gets a bonus of 5 points if they get 4 "A"s in all 4 elective exams.

==== "4+X" system ====
This system was used after the New Curriculum Reform was employed in Guangdong province and now has been abandoned.

- "X" means that according to their own interests, candidates can choose one or two subjects either from arts subjects, including Political Science, History, and Geography (Political Science and Geography cannot be chosen simultaneously), or from science subjects, including Biology, Physics, and Chemistry (Physics and Biology cannot be chosen simultaneously).
- Yuwen and a foreign language are compulsory. Two separate Mathematics tests are designed respectively for art students and science students.
- In addition to three compulsory subjects and X subject, art students have to take comprehensive tests of arts, and science students have to take comprehensive tests of science.

==== "3+1+X" system ====
This system was implemented in Shanghai since the employment of comprehensive courses but now abandoned.

- "3" refers to three compulsory subjects "Yuwen, Mathematics, and a foreign language", with 150 scores for each subject.
- "1" refers to one subject that candidates choose according to their own interests and specialty from "Political Science, History, Geography, Physics, Chemistry and Biology". This subject accounts 150 scores when admitted by universities and colleges at undergraduate level. The score is not included in the total score when admitted by vocational and technical colleges. Therefore, candidates can give up this subject when applying for colleges at vocational and technical level.
- "X" refers to comprehensive ability test, which is categorized into arts tests and science tests. Arts students can either choose one subject from Political Science, History and Geography, or take an arts comprehensive test when giving up "1' subject. Science students can either choose one subject from Physics, Chemistry and Biology, or take a science comprehensive test when giving up "1" subject. Regardless of arts and science categories, all the comprehensive ability tests cover knowledge of six subjects, including Political Science, History, Geography, Physics, Chemistry and Biology. In the first volume of the arts test, number of questions related to arts subjects exceeds science questions, and vice versa; the second volume of the two tests are the same.

==== "3+2+X" system ====
This was a pilot college entrance examination system implemented by the Jiangsu Province in 2003 after examining other testing systems, but it was subsequently replaced by the "3+2" system in 2008. Subject tests will take turns into the embrace of National Standard. A new policy substituted the old one in 2021.

- "3" refers to three compulsory subjects "Yuwen, mathematics and a foreign language", which are recorded in the total score.
- "2" refers to choosing two subjects from the following six areas "political science, history, geography, physics, chemistry, biology", which are not recorded in total score but a class like A+, A, etc. will be recorded.
- "X" refers to a comprehensive science or liberal arts exam, which is not recorded in the total score, only for university admission reference.

==== "3+X+1" system ====
This is part of the curriculum reform in China.

- "3" refers to Yuwen, Mathematics and a foreign language, which are compulsory testing subjects for each candidate.
- "X" means choosing one of the two comprehensive tests in either sciences or liberal arts, according to the student's interest. The "3" and "X" are the same as the national "3+X" system.
- "1" refers to a basic proficiency test on skills (基本能力测试) that high school graduates needs and should have in order to adapt to social life. This college entrance examination system was implemented for the first time in Shandong in 2007 and ended in 2014.
- The examination system in Shandong Province reverted to the "3+X" system as of the most recent testing in June 2014 and assumed the reformed plan in 2020.

== Reform of the National College Entrance Examination ==
Gaokao systems by province in 2022. Orange and purple showing the reformed exam – New Gaokao (新高考)

=== "3+1+2" system ===
This system was first introduced in 2019, when Hebei Province, Liaoning Province, Jiangsu Province, Fujian Province, Hubei Province, Hunan Province, Guangdong Province, Chongqing City announced their examination reform plan, and performed on the 2018 students. This system gives students a wider choice on what subjects they are being tested on comparing to "3+X" system, but limits students' choice against the "3+3" system. By 2024, most regions of the country would implement the system as the successor of their "3+X" system.

- "3" refers to compulsory subjects, including "Yuwen, Mathematics and a foreign language", each of which accounts for 150/750 in total score.
- "1" refers to a selection between Physics and History, which accounts for 100/750 of the total score.
- "2" refers to two subjects that candidates choose according to their own interests and specialty from Chemistry, Biology, Political Science, and Geography. This test was renamed as Grading Exam of the Academic Proficiency Examination for Senior High School Students (普通高中学业水平等级性考试) as these exams are held per region, unlike the compulsory courses which are held nationally by the Ministry of Education.

To promise the legitimacy of the Grading Exam courses, the final scores of the four courses were transferred to band scores before they were counted into the total score. Example below is Guangdong's algorithm.

When weighing the score, the candidate's score of one course are sorted from high to low, and divided into five group according to rank distribution. A grade from A to E was given to these groups. The band score is then calculated after confirming the grade.

Relativity Between Portion of Each Grade and the Band Score
Grade	A	B	C	D	E
approx. portion	~17%	~33%	~33%	~15%	~2%
Band score range	100–83	82–71	70–59	58–41	40–30

The band score has a range from 100 to 30, each grade has a typical range of 10pts to 17pts. According to each candidate's actual score, the score's belonging grade, and the grade's scoring range, the score was transferred in proportion by the following formula:

$$\frac{s_2-s_0}{s_0-s_1}=\frac{t_2-t_0}{t_0-t_1}$$

$s_1$, $s_2$represents the lower and higher limit of the actual score of each grade; $t_1$, $t_2$represents the lower and higher limits of the band score of each grade. $s_0$represents the candidate's actual score, $t_0$represents the candidate's band score.

=== "3+3" system ===
This system has been implemented in Shanghai and Zhejiang since the employment of comprehensive courses since September 2014. Since 2017, Beijing, Tianjin, Shandong, Hainan have begun to use this program.

- The first "3" stands for three compulsory courses, including Yuwen, mathematics, and a foreign language (a choice of one from English, Japanese, Russian, German, French, Spanish).
- The second "3" stands for three selective courses which depend on students' choice from physics, chemistry, biology, technology (Zhejiang only), geography, politics and history. Like above, this test was renamed as Grading Exam of the Academic Proficiency Examination for Senior High School Students (普通高中学业水平等级性考试).
- Originally, the initial intention of the reform was to let students develop their strengths and avoid their weaknesses; however, students taking the exam rushed to test into subjects that were perceived as higher-scoring. This has resulted in very few people entering into certain subjects, such as physics.
- In the calculation of the scores of the other, 70 points (in Shanghai) or 100 points (in Zhejiang) for each of the subjects, according to the levels like A+, A, B+, ..., D, E, etc. (Divided into 21 grades in Zhejiang, 11 in Shanghai; 3 points between every two grades). According to the published news, Beijing and Tianjin indicated that their plan is similar to the Zhejiang plan, and Anhui's request for comment is similar to Zhejiang, too; Shandong is divided into eight grades of A, B+, B, C+, C, D+, D, and E. According to the original scores and equal conversion rules of the candidates, they are converted to 91–100, 81–90, 71–80, 61–70, 51–60, 41–50, 31–40, 21–30 eight score intervals, get the grades of candidates.'
- Another concern is that candidates who want to take the college entrance examination must first take the Qualifying Exam of the Academic Proficiency Examination for Senior High School Students (普通高中学业水平合格性考试), which results are credited as "qualified" and "failed".

Exam scope
Subject	Compulsory Courses	Elective Compulsory Courses
Yuwen	Compulsory First Volume; Compulsory Last Volume	Elective Compulsory First Volume; Elective Compulsory Middle Volume; Elective Compulsory Last Volume
Mathematics	Compulsory First Volume; Compulsory Second Volume	Elective Compulsory First Volume; Elective Compulsory Second Volume; Elective Compulsory Third Volume
English	Compulsory First Volume; Compulsory Second Volume; Compulsory Third Volume	Elective Compulsory First Volume; Elective Compulsory Second Volume; Elective Compulsory Third Volume; Elective Compulsory Fourth Volume
Physics	Compulsory First Volume; Compulsory Second Volume; Compulsory Third Volume	Elective Compulsory First Volume; Elective Compulsory Second Volume; Elective Compulsory Third Volume
Chemistry	Compulsory First Volume; Compulsory Second Volume	Elective Compulsory I Principle of Chemical Reaction; Elective Compulsory II Material Structure and Properties; Elective Compulsory III Fundamentals of Organic Chemistry
Biology	Compulsory I Molecules and Cells; Compulsory II Heredity and Evolution	Elective Compulsory I Steady State and Regulations; Elective Compulsory II Creatures and Environment; Elective Compulsory III Biotechnology and Biological Engineering
Political Science	Compulsory I Socialism with Chinese Characteristics; Compulsory II Economy and Society; Compulsory III Politics and Rule of Law; Compulsory IV Philosophy and Cultures	Elective Compulsory I Contemporary International Politics and Economy; Elective Compulsory II Law and Life; Elective Compulsory III Logic and Thinking
History	Compulsory Outline of Chinese and Foreign History (I); Compulsory Outline of Chinese and Foreign History (II)	Elective Compulsory I National System and Social Governance; Elective Compulsory II Economic and Social Life; Elective Compulsory III Cultural Exchange and Communication
Geography	Compulsory First Volume; Compulsory Second Volume	Elective Compulsory I Fundamentals of Physical Geography; Elective Compulsory II Regional Development; Elective Compulsory III Resources, Environment and National Security

== Procedure ==
The Gaokao is not uniform across the country, but administered uniformly within each province of China or each direct-administered municipality. The Gaokao is graded variously across the country.

=== Before the examination ===
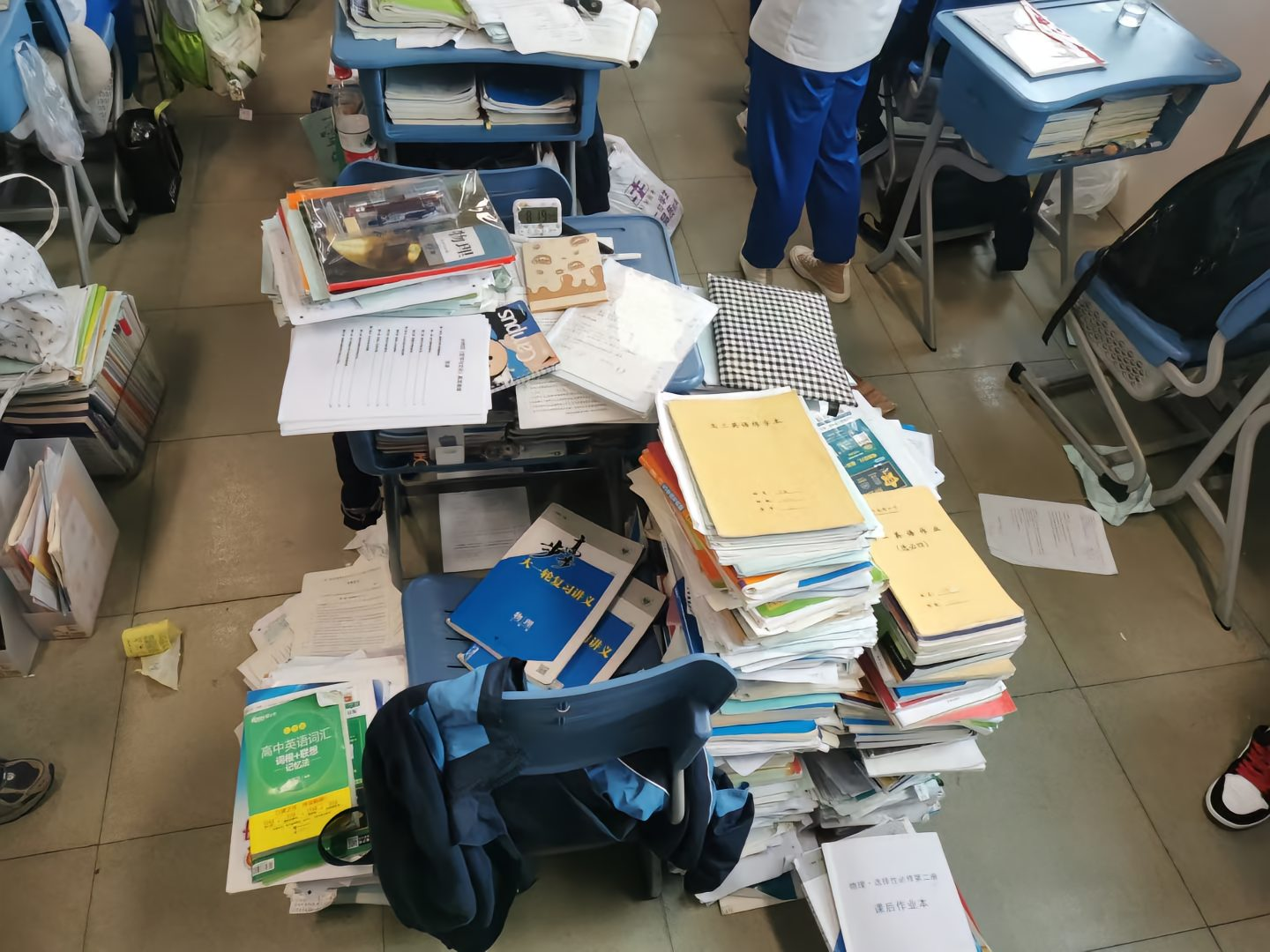
A student's desk in preparation for the gaokao

In the winter of the year before the examination year, students are required to register for the examination. The registration is usually completed on the official website of the provincial academy of educational recruitment and examination, and examinees are required to fill out an online form, which includes name, gender, date of birth, identification number, address, domicile, political status, school, phone number, and other information about the examination and admission. The form requires students to choose elective-mandatory subjects they elected. Three subjects are universally mandatory: Yuwen (Chinese language and literature), Mathematics, and a foreign language — almost always English. Students may choose Russian, Japanese, German, French or Spanish in a proportion about 5% as of 2025. The other six standard subjects are three natural-science subjects — physics, chemistry, biology, and three liberal arts subjects — history, geography, and political science; applicants can elect 3 subjects to take tests from them.

However, there are general requirements examinees have to comply with:

1. Abide by the Constitution and laws of the People's Republic of China.
2. Have a high school diploma or equivalent.
3. Be in good health.
4. Have read carefully and are willing to abide by the rules of the Register and other regulations and policies of the Institutions of Higher Learning and the Office of Admissions Committee about the enrollment management.
5. If foreign immigrants who settle down in China conform to the enlisted condition of the Gaokao, they can then apply for the Gaokao with the foreign immigrants' resident certificate, which are sent by the Provincial Public Security Department at the location that is assigned.
6. If willing to apply for the Military Academy: students who are graduating this year and have studied in high school for the first time cannot be older than 20 years of age and unmarried; if willing to apply for the Police Academy: students who are graduating this year and have studied in high school for the first time cannot be older than 22 years of age and unmarried; if willing to apply for the foreign language major in Police Academy: students who are graduating this year and have studied in high school for the first time cannot be older than 20 years of age and unmarried.
7. If students from Juvenile Classes want to take the Gaokao, their schools need to pre-select, send a certification of approval, inform the exact required courses, and clarify the offices of Admissions Committee where they will take the Gaokao. After doing so, the students can then file the application. After the Office of Admissions Committee reviews and approves, the students can apply for and attend the Gaokao at the correct location. Students who apply for Shao Nian Ban must be part of a small percentage of the population. They must have a very high IQ, their grades must be excellent, and they must study at a secondary or high school under the age of 15 (excluding those who are graduating this year and have studied in high school for the first time).

The following groups are prohibited from taking the exam:

1. Students who are currently studying in higher education.
2. Students whose Hukou files are incomplete, such as those with no school status.
3. One who is serving a prison sentence or is being prosecuted for violating Criminal Law of the People's Republic of China.

In the spring before Gaokao, examinees participate in school-organized medical examinations, in order to find diseases that affect future majors. For example, students with myopia are not allowed to apply for military schools, and colorblind students won't be admitted by medical professions. It is also noting that "have a high school diploma or equivalent" requires students to firstly take Qualifying Examination of the Academic Proficiency Examination for Senior High School Students (普通高中学业水平合格性考试), unofficially called "Huikao (会考)", including 12 subjects students learned in senior high school. The examination are always very simple to pass. Their results are credited as "qualified" and "failed", "qualified" accounts for 97% of the total number of examination and "failed" accounts 3% of the total, in the end hand in a Comprehensive Qualification Report based on the student's performance and social activity. The result of the Qualifying Examination and the Report would be given to the college as a reference when admitting. Failed students have three chances to take makeup examinations. Chemistry, biology, geography and history examinations are held in the summer of senior one; Yuwen, mathematics, English, physics, politics examinations took places in the winter of senior two; and information technology and general technology examinations took up in the summer of senior two; physical education test is in the spring of senior three-months before Gaokao. Elective subjects they failed in Huikao are not available for applicants when signing up to Gaokao.

=== Examination ===
It is arranged at the end of the spring semester and secondary school graduates across the country take the examination simultaneously over a two to four-day period.

Gaokao Time Arrangement
Date	7 Jun.		8 Jun.	9 Jun.			10 Jun.		
Time	9:00–11:30	15:00–17:00	15:00–16:40	8:00–9:30	11:00–12:30	15:30–17:00	8:00–9:30	11:00–12:30	15:30–17:00
Subject	Yuwen	Mathematics	Foreign Language	Physics	Politics	Chemistry	History	Biology	Geography
Score	150	150	150	100	100	100	100	100	100

=== Admission ===
Applicants to some specialist programs are also screened by additional criteria: some art departments (e.g. audition), military and police schools (political screening and physical exam), and some sports programs (tryout).

Exam scores can be used to apply to universities outside mainland China. Across the globe, Hong Kong is on their top list. In 2007, 7 students with the overall highest score in their provinces entered Hong Kong's universities rather than the two major universities in mainland China. In 2010, over 1,200 students entered the 12 local institutions which provide tertiary education courses through this examination. In addition, the City University of Hong Kong and Chinese University of Hong Kong directly participate in the application procedure like other mainland universities. In Malaysia, the University of Malaya recognized application via Gaokao for bachelor's degree with a minimum score of 520 starting March 27, 2025.

The examination is essentially the only criterion for tertiary education admissions. Poor test performance almost always means giving up on that goal. Students hoping to attend university will spend most of their waking moments studying prior to the exam. If they fail in their first attempt, some students repeat the last year of high school to retake the exam during the following year.

In different places and across different time periods in history, students were required to apply for their intended university or college prior to the exam, after the exam, or more recently, after they receive their scores, by filling a list of ranked preferences. The application list is classified into several tiers (including at least early admissions, key universities, regular universities, vocational colleges), each of which can contain around 4–6 choices for institutions and programs. Typically, an institution or program would only admit students who apply to it as their first choice in each tier. In some regions, students are allowed to apply for different tiers at different times. For example, in Shanghai, students apply for early admission, key universities and regular universities prior to the exam, but can apply for other colleges after they receive their scores.

== Criticisms ==
=== Regional discrimination ===
A university usually sets a fixed admission quota for each province, with a higher number of students coming from its home province. As the advanced educational resources (number and quality of universities) are distributed unevenly across China, it is argued that people are being discriminated against during the admission process based on their geographic region. For example, compared to Beijing, Jiangxi province has fewer universities per capita. Therefore, Jiangxi usually receives fewer admission quotas compared with Beijing, which makes a significantly higher position among applicants necessary for a Jiangxi candidate to be admitted by the same university than their Beijing counterpart. The unequal admission schemes for different provinces and regions might intensify competition among examinees from provinces with fewer advanced education resources. For example, Peking University planned to admit 800 science students from Beijing (with 80,000 candidates in total), but only 38 from Shandong (with 660,000 candidates in total). This is not similar to the practice of regional universities in other countries which receive subsidies from regional governments in addition to or in place of those received from central governments, as universities in China largely depend on state budget rather than local budget. However, this regionally preferential policy does provide subsidies to minority students from under-developed regions that enjoy limited educational resources, such as Tibet and Xinjiang.

In recent years, varied admission standards have led some families to relocate for the sole purpose of advancing their children's chances of entering university.

In addition, regional discrimination is not only restricted to the ratio for admission. This is best illustrated with an example of the Hubei Province, where students' exam scores have been higher than other provinces for a long time. A score for a Hubei student to just reach the admission cut-off line for a key university may be enough for a student from another province to be admitted by a much better university, and even enough for a Beijing student to be admitted by top universities like Tsinghua University and Peking University.

Some local students in Hong Kong complained that it was unfair that the increasing intake of Mainland students who have performed at a high level in this examination increases the admission grades of universities, making it harder for local students to get admission. In 2010, more than 5,000 out of the 17,000 students who achieved the minimum university entry requirement were not offered places in any degree courses in the UGC-funded universities.

=== Migrant children ===
As a student is required to take exams in the region where their household registration (under the Hukou system) is located, the qualification of migrant children becomes controversial. Since 2012, some regions began to relax the requirements and allow some children of migrants to take their College Entrance Exam in regions outside of their household registration. As of 2016, Guangdong's policies are the most relaxed. A child of migrants can take their Entrance Exam in Guangdong if they have attended 3 years of highschool in the province, and if the parent(s) have legal jobs and have paid for 3 years of social insurance in the province.

=== Special concessions ===
There are special concessions for members of ethnic minorities, foreign nationals, persons with family origin in Taiwan, and children of military casualties. Students can also receive bonus marks by achieving high results in academic Olympiads, other science and technology competitions, sporting competitions, as well as "political or moral" distinction. In the 2018 National People's Congress, the government passed legislation abolishing all bonus scores from competitions.

=== Reform of bonus‑point policies (2014–present) ===
In recent years, authorities have progressively scaled back the range and value of bonus points awarded to special categories of Gaokao candidates. A 2014 State Council of China policy blueprint instructed all provinces to "drastically reduce and strictly control such items", and to abolish sports and arts‑talent extra credits by 2015.

The Ministry of Education announced in 2018 that five nationwide categories, including academic Olympiad winners, science‑and‑technology competition laureates, and provincial‑level excellent students would be eliminated to ensure a fairer and more scientific selection process.

=== Psychological pressure ===
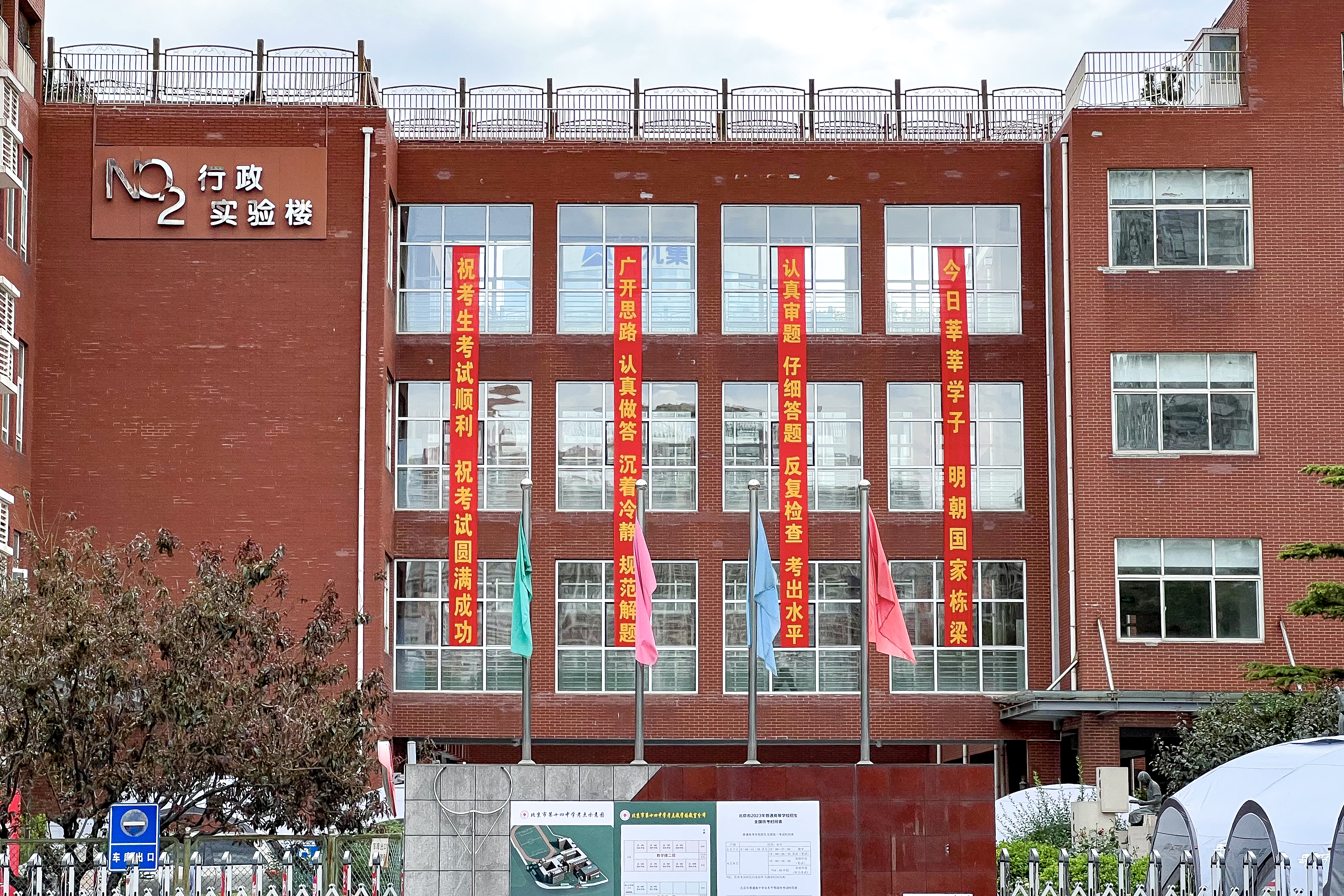
Vertical banners at Beijing No. 14 High School, which encourage students to stay calm and focused in Gaokao, and wish them success.

Because Gaokao is one of the most influential examinations in China and students can only take the test once a year, both teachers and students undergo tremendous pressure in preparing for and taking the exam. For teachers, because Chinese society heavily focuses on the rate of admission into universities, they work to prepare every student for the exam. Because of this, teachers give students more and more practice for exams. This teaching methodology, colloquially referred to as "cramming", involves students memorizing large amounts of information fed to them by teachers and undertaking many practice exercises in order to optimize exam writing ability. One of the disadvantages of this method is the lack of focus on teaching critical thinking and ignoring students' emotions, values and personalities. Many examinees suffer from severe anxiety resulting from and during the examination. In some cases, examinees may faint in the examination room. A two‑stage epidemiological survey of 6818 students who had just taken the Gaokao found that 36.5 % of all diagnosed cases of depressive disorder experienced their first onset within the 9‑month window spanning three months before the exam to three months after matriculation.

Further and deeper-stemming criticisms have been leveled that the testing system is the "most pressure-packed examination in the world". Behaviors surrounding the testing period have been extreme under some reports, with doctors in Tianjin purportedly prescribing birth control pills to female students whose parents wanted to ensure their daughters were not menstruating at the time of examination. Testing pressure, for some critics, has been linked to fainting, increased drop out rates, and increased rates of teenage clinical depression.

Pressure caused as a result of the Gaokao has been linked to a rise in student suicides. A school in Hebei province installed suicide barriers to prevent students from jumping to their deaths in response to two suicides in the facility related to the exam.

== Impact ==
The Gaokao tends to impact the lives of most Chinese teenagers and their parents. In Zhengzhou, Henan, the local bus company parked a number 985 bus outside a Gaokao center for parents to wait in, echoing the popular Project 985 enrollment program for university entrances.

The impact and importance of the Gaokao exam has only increased as the number of students taking the exam has risen to nearly 13 million people in 2023, a 900,000 person increase from 2022 and around a 9,000,000 person increase from 2000. This combines with strict quotas from the top schools such as Peking and Tsinghua University who take less than 7,000 students a year to make enrolling in a Chinese university much more competitive. Students successful in taking the Gaokao can give themselves a boost heading into a youth employment market in China with 20.4% unemployment.

Due to the pressures surrounding the Gaokao exam, there have been reports of Chinese families and educators being 'jealous' of more western teaching styles. According to Lao Kaisheng, a professor in the education department of Beijing Normal University, "The education system here puts a heavy emphasis on rote memorization, which is great for students' test-taking ability but not for their problem-solving and leadership abilities or their interpersonal skills." The results of this exam affect family honor and the future of the Chinese youth, creating a 'gaokao-above-all' mentality and high pressure for students and parents alike. This may be why there has been an increase in 'sang' culture in China, which refers to the reduced work ethic, a lack of self-motivation, and an apathetic demeanor among Chinese youth. An increasing number of young people describe themselves as sang because they feel that it is futile to pursue traditional notions of success.

University quotas and disparities between provinces have also led to migration patterns based on the test. This is called gaokao migration.

== See also ==
- Class of 1977 (China)
- College Scholastic Ability Test (Suneung, Korea)
- Education in China
- Hong Kong Diploma of Secondary Education
- Higher education in China
- Imperial examination
- Joint Entrance Examination – Main
- List of admission tests to colleges and universities
- List of universities and colleges in China
- Zhongkao (Junior High School Scholastic Aptitude Examination, China)
