= Worker-Peasant-Soldier student =

Classist affirmative action measure in China (1970–1976)

Worker-Peasant-Soldier students (Chinese: 工农兵学员; pinyin: Gōngnóngbīng xuéyuán) were Chinese students who entered colleges between 1970 and 1976, during the later part of the Cultural Revolution (1966–1976). They were accepted not for their academic qualifications, but rather for their work experience as workers, peasants, or soldiers favored by the Chinese Communist Party as part of the "Five Red Categories" and enjoyed affirmative action during the Cultural Revolution. No one was admitted directly from high school without any previous work experience.

In 1977, after Chairman Mao Zedong's death, the Worker-Peasant-Soldier program ended when Deng Xiaoping reinstated the National Higher Education Entrance Examination, where high school graduates were once again allowed to enter colleges without having to work first.

== Notable students ==
- Xi Jinping, General Secretary of the Chinese Communist Party (since 2012), studied at Tsinghua University as a Worker-Peasant-Soldier student.
- Zhao Leji (赵乐际; 1957) is the current chairman of the Standing Committee of the National People's Congress, studied at Peking University.
- Wang Qishan (王岐山; 1948) was a member of the Politburo Standing Committee from 2012 to 2017 who also served as the Secretary of the Central Commission for Discipline Inspection and Vice President of China (2018–2023); he studied at Northwest University.
- Song Binbin (宋彬彬; 1947) Chinese Revolutionary and leader of the Red Guard, studied at Jilin University as a Worker-Peasant-Soldier-Student, receiving a bachelor's degree in 1975.
