= Zhongkao =

Junior high school graduation exam in China

- Simplified Chinese: 初中学业水平考试
- Traditional Chinese: 初中學業程度考試
Transcriptions
Standard Mandarin
- Hanyu Pinyin: Chūzhōng xuéyè shuǐpíng kǎoshì

The Junior High School Scholastic Aptitude Examination (初中学业水平考试), commonly abbreviated as the Zhongkao (中考), is the examination for junior high school graduation in China. The exam scores are used for both junior high school graduation and senior high school admissions.

== See also ==
- Gaokao
