= Hugo Shong =

Chinese businessman

- 熊晓鸽
- Born: 31 December 1955 (age 70); Xiangtan City, Hunan Province, China
- Education: Hunan University (BA); Chinese Academy of Social Sciences (MA); Boston University (MS); Fletcher School of Law and Diplomacy (PhD)
- Occupations: Businessman; Venture Capitalist
- Known for: Founding chairman of IDG Capital

Hugo Shong (also known as 熊晓鸽, Xiong Xiaoge, Xiaoge Xiong) is a Chinese venture capitalist who is the founding chairman of IDG Capital, a Chinese investment firm. He brought IDG to China in 1993, making it the first global investment firm to enter the Chinese market. Since then, he has invested in many successful companies, including Baidu, Tencent and Xiaomi, and is regarded as one of the most influential investors in China's technology market.

Hugo is also a philanthropist who supports education, environmental protection, and poverty alleviation, among others. He has donated to his alma mater Hunan University, James C. Thomson Memorial Fund of Boston University, and the China Foundation for Poverty Alleviation.

== Early life and education ==
Hugo Shong was born in Xiangtan City, Hunan Province, China in 1956. In 1977, he took the newly-resumed nation-wide college entrance examination and was admitted by Hunan University. After receiving a BA degree in English language from the university in 1981, he went to capital Beijing to become an interpreter and English teacher in the Ministry of Electromechanics. He then passed another competitive entrance examination and studied Journalism at the Graduate School of the Chinese Academy of Social Sciences from 1984 to 1986.

Shong then traveled to the United States as a "penniless graduate" and received mentorship from professor James Thomson of Boston University. In 1987, Shong earned the MS degree from Boston University's College of Communication, followed by PhD study at the Fletcher School of Law and Diplomacy (1987–88). Furthermore, he completed Harvard Business School's Advanced Management Program in the fall of 1996.

== Career ==
In 1993, Hugo Shong launched and led IDG Capital starting venture capital investment in China. This joint venture, in cooperation with the Shanghai Municipal Commission of Science, marked the beginning of IDG's presence in China. Hugo Shong served as the general manager of this venture, and is known as "the first person to introduce high-tech industry venture funds into China".

Shong is the founding chairman of IDG Capital, which has invested in more than 1,300 companies, supported over 100 leading unicorn companies valued at over $1 billion, and made nearly 400 successful exits through IPOs and M&A in mainland China, Hong Kong China, the United States, and Europe. He has invested to help make numerous successful companies including Tencent, Baidu, Xiaomi, Meituan, Qihoo 360, Pinduoduo and Bilibili. In 2012, China Daily evaluated the Shong's venture capital fund at $3.8 billion.

He also launched and published over 40 magazines in China and Vietnam, including the Chinese editions of Cosmopolitan, Harper's Bazaar, National Geographic, Men's Health, Robb Report and Electronic Products, along with the Vietnamese editions of PC World and CIO magazines.

== See also ==
- IDG Capital
