= Zouhuorumo =

Psychological condition related to qigong

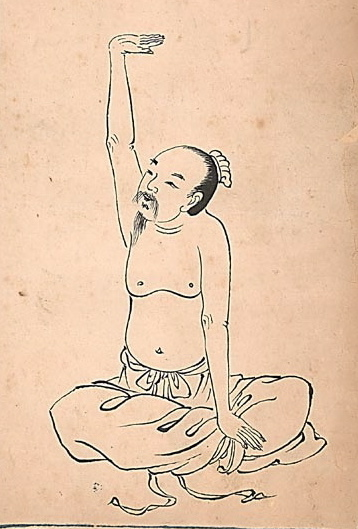
Qing-dynasty illustration of the Baduanjin qigong exercise Separate Heaven and Earth

Zouhuorumo (Chinese: 走火入魔; pinyin: zǒuhuǒrùmó) is a syndrome of psychological and somatic symptoms related to the practice of qigong and other self-cultivation methods. Symptoms of zouhuorumo include mental and physical agitation and pain, thought disorder in severe cases and other neurological symptoms such as altered sensation. There are several theoretical models as to the cause of zouhuorumo. The syndrome may stem from overly intense focus on the practice, incorrect performance of the practice, or the practice of qigong by individuals prone to psychological disturbance. A swell in the popularity of qigong in China in the 1980s and 1990s became known as qigong fever. In response, the Government of China referred to zouhuorumo as "qigong deviation".

== Terminology ==
The term zǒuhuǒrùmó (走火入魔) is a compound of the words zouhuo (Chinese: 走火; pinyin: zǒuhuǒ) and rumo (Chinese: 入魔; pinyin: rùmó).

Zouhuo means to have a spark; to have a short circuit; or to be on fire. The word, rumo (Chinese: 入魔; pinyin: rùmó) means to be infatuated, obsessed, fixated or possessed.

In traditional Chinese medicine, zouhuorumo symbolises an excess of heat moving upwards through the body to the head which causes an heightened level of thinking and emotion. In contemporary Chinese medical terminology, zouhuorumo is connected with the concept of qigong deviation (simplified Chinese: 气功偏差; traditional Chinese: 氣功偏差; pinyin: qìgōngpiānchā).

== Background ==
Zouhuorumo is a syndrome of psychological and somatic symptoms related to the practice of qigong, a system of movements intended to improve the body, mind and spirit. A causal pathological link between qigong and the syndrome has not been identified. Similar syndromes have been noted in yoga, meditation and hypnosis. Zouhuorumo can occur in both the clergy the laity. In most cases the symptoms are short-lived and self-resolving.

The symptoms tend to cluster in one of three groups. A first group includes anxiety, panic episodes, automatic movements, shivering and convulsing. The second group involves auditory and visual hallucinations. The third cluster includes delusions and psychoses. Sufferers may complain of emotional exhaustion (previously known as neurasthenia). Somatic symptoms include regional or generalised pain and other abnormal sensations.

Although an ancient practice, qigong had a popular revival in China in the 1980s and 1990s. The Government of China expressed reservations about this qigong mass practice, commercialization and the rise of both qigong grand-masters and fraudsters. In response, Hence, zouhuorumo was referred to as qigong deviation.

== Theoretical models ==
=== Traditional practitioners ===
Practitioners of traditional Chinese medicine consider zouhuorumo a mental disorder induced by an imbalance of shen ( 神, "mind; spirit") and jing ( 精, "essence"), which are elements of the qi. In this case, the imbalance in the qi is caused by an intense focus on the individual's study and practice of qigong. This is a departure from the primary purpose of qigong which is to assist the individual to improve their physical, mental and spiritual well-being. The desire to quickly attain mastery of qigong in order to access special powers, gain wealth and fame or to escape from everyday life, leads the individual to become deeply immersed in the practice. Treatment includes herbal remedies and acupuncture.

=== Chinese psychiatry ===
The Chinese Society of Psychiatry in its publication, Chinese Classification of Mental Disorders (CCMD-2) describes the patient being well prior to practicing qigong and the symptoms beginning during or after qigong. Other psychiatric illnesses such as schizophrenia, mood disorder (anxiety or depression for example) or neurosis must be excluded.

=== Western psychiatry ===
In the Diagnostic and Statistical Manual of Mental Disorders of 2022, (DSM-V-rt), Zouhuorumo does not appear as a distinct diagnostic entity. Rather, it is categorised as a culture-bound syndrome. That is, a condition where reference to an individual's cultural heritage may aid the diagnostic process. Conversion disorder and histrionic personality disorder are also diagnoses considered in this context.

Zouhuorumo is described as a condition that may begin acutely after practicing qigong. Symptoms may include a feeling of detachment from reality, paranoia, psychosis and various physical symptoms. It occurs more frequently in people who are vulnerable to such reactions and those who are overly focussed in their practice of qigong.

Where the presentation of zouhuorumo is severe, the psychiatric community raises the possibility that the stress of intense practice of qingong unveils a latent psychosis. This is in contrast to a reactive psychosis. If possible predisposing psychiatric conditions such as schizophrenia, bipolar disorder and post-traumatic stress disorder are present, self-guided qigong practice is contraindicated.

=== Qigong community ===
Within the qigong community, zouhuorumo is attributed to improper practice. This may result from the inexperience of an instructor; incorrect instruction; impatience; becoming fearful, irritated, confused, or suspicious during qigong practice and/or overly intense focus. This improper practice represents incorrect channeling of qi.

The community suggests those who have signs of excess heat in the body such as sharp headaches and flushing, and who are easily excited, are anxious or have florid imaginations, should undertake qigong with frequent slow grounding movements. Conversely, those with excess cold symptoms such as dull headaches and cold extremities or who are prone to melancholy and dull thinking should, as a foundation of practice, use standing, faster movements and techniques that lift the qi.

The community advises that zouhuorumo can be self-managed with relaxation, walking, self-vibrating, self-patting, and self-massage. Clinical treatments can involve psychological counseling, expert guidance of practice, acupuncture, herbal treatments, massage, and external qi (a practitioner directs or emits their qi to help another person).
