= Mental health in the Middle East =

The study of mental health in the Middle East is an area of research that continues to grow in its scope and content. As of May 10, 2019, WHO study shows over 70 countries and territories across six regions, including Egypt, Iraq, Jordan, Lebanon, the occupied Palestinian territory, Qatar, Syria, Tunisia, the UAE, and Yemen, have prioritized coverage of mental health conditions.

To accurately evaluate and understand the mental health issues of the Middle East, one must take into account the geographic, historical, cultural, and social influences of that part of the world. While each of the many countries commonly considered part of the "Middle East" is unique, there is a binding ethnic fabric that should be considered. Firstly, the Middle East is the origin of many of the major world religions. Christianity, Judaism and Islam, all began in this region. Of these many religions, Islam has had the most lasting and culturally significant influence on the region, encompassing well over ninety percent (90%) of the population by some measurements. The tenets of the Islamic faith, and its strict purpose, certainly have served as both a guide and a hindrance to the practices' of mental health care providers in the Middle East. There is a conflict between ancient religious teachings and the modern day or "Western world" approach to the issues of mental health.

== Historical perspective ==
Mental health in the Middle East, from Pharaonic times through to the Islamic Renaissance, has a rich and complex history. During Pharaonic times, soma and psyche were terms used to define mental disorders, and such disorders were described as problems of the heart or uterus, as stated in Eber's and Kahoun's Papyri. While mystical culture predominated at that time, mental disorders were treated on a somatic basis. In the Islamic era, those with mental illness were not known to have endured any forms of torture, nor were they ostracized; this was due to the belief that possession by a good Muslim genie was possible.

Islam, the predominant religion in the Middle East, was among the earliest major religions to advocate for sympathy and care toward the mentally ill, absolving them from accountability for their actions. Despite the common association of spiritual possession with Islam, a thematic analysis of Arabic texts and four English translations of the Qu'ran revealed no direct link between spiritual possession and mental disorders in the holy scriptures.

In ancient times, mental health treatments in Middle Eastern countries took various forms. For instance, ancient Iran had distinct medical specialties, including healers focused on the body (tan-pezeshk) and those specializing in the psyche (ravan-pezeshk), which are equivalent to contemporary psychiatrists. The first psychiatric hospital in the Middle East, named In Sina, was established in the Syrian Arab Republic in 1929. The building of another hospital in Aleppo followed in 1956.

Historical records include narratives about Masud Khan, born into a Muslim feudal royalty family in Iran in 1924, who likely suffered from undiagnosed bipolar disorder. Notably, he underwent examination by prominent figures in Western psychoanalysis, such as Anna Freud.

== Modern views ==
Historical views on mental health still remain prominent in the Middle East as the stigma has not changed even in the modern day. Having insufficient knowledge of mental health can lead to a higher probability of developing somatic symptom disorder. This is particularly evident in conflict-affected areas such as Syria and Palestine, where conditions like depression and stress frequently appear as physical health problems. These symptoms are often dismissed or ignored due to the widespread prevalence of similar challenges within the community. Studies have shown that in the Arab region, people tend to link mental health issues with cultural or religious beliefs. There is a highly prevalent stigma and negative attitude that surrounds mental health disorders, which leads to people not seeking appropriate help. Socially acceptable forms of seeking care are practiced by religious leaders, this method remains to be the most prominent form of seeking help.

== Regional variations ==
The overall lack of mental health services available across the Middle East is a largely contributing factor to people not seeking help. The impact of mental health varies throughout the Middle East due to some parts facing wars, economic difficulties, and sociopolitical unrest. In these countries, due to the challenges faced by individuals, the most basic needs are not met; therefore, mental health often is not prioritized. Whereas in more developed countries, such as Saudi Arabia, where free health care is provided and people do have access to mental health services as the availability of mental health professionals are widely available. Society's attitude towards mental health plays a substantial role in seeking help, compared to the service availability in developing countries. Saudi Arabia's Vision 2030, includes expanding its mental health infrastructure, by having more services available to those who need help, as well as, the expansion of medical schools and training on mental health.

== Spiritual beliefs and superstitions ==
The belief in being possessed by supernatural entities such as jinn (demons), seher (magic), or hasad (the "evil eye") is prevalent among Muslims in general and is reportedly more prevalent among women, the elderly, and those with lower levels of education. Although the belief in demonic possession is officially condemned as inconsistent with Islam and its teachings, it persists in Middle Eastern culture. These attributions underscore the intricacies involved in comprehending and addressing mental disorders in Middle Eastern culture, highlighting the importance of culturally-sensitive initiatives to reduce stigma.

=== Zār ===
Zār (زار) known as possession by a spirit, is exhibited by some Middle Eastern cultures. Specific ceremonies are performed to placate the zār and relieve the symptoms of the afflicted individual. These ritualized ceremonies, organized and facilitated by a leader, include the affected individual and a person previously affected by the zār, and involve "incense, music, and movement". The details of the ceremony vary by region. Some leaders may recommend that the patient first seek the help of a doctor, while others believe that interventions by the doctor, such as using needles for injections, may further agitate the zār, creating more problems for the patient. Those who choose traditional treatment for zār remain in isolation for up to seven days. This syndrome has been reported in North African and Middle Eastern countries, including Ethiopia, Egypt, Iran, and Sudan. Signs and symptoms of zār may include dissociative episodes, unexpected laughing, yelling, or singing, or even patients hitting their heads against a wall. Clients may exhibit apathy and be reclusive. Those under the influence of the zār may refuse to eat or carry out activities of daily living, and may develop an extended interaction with the possessing spirit.

=== The evil eye ===
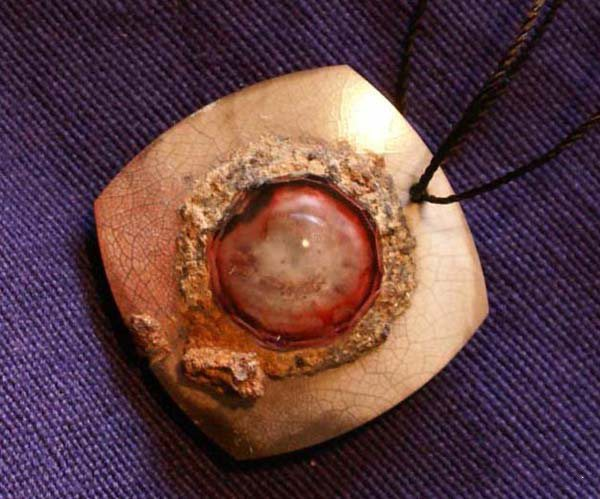
A Corundum Evil Eye Amulet from Mesapotamia

The "evil eye", also known as ʿayn al-ḥasūd (عين الحسود), is a belief that certain individuals have the power to cause harm or bad luck to others through their gaze. This belief is found in various cultures around the world, including the Middle East, Mediterranean, South Asia, and Latin America. Excessive fear of the evil eye and those who cast it is common among certain people. Such beliefs serve to benefit charlatans who prey on the minds of such victims. A certain class of society are seen standing at the gates of these charlatans, driven by illusion, disillusion and fear of the evil eye and those who cast it – and the devil whispers to them, leading them to believe that their mental disorders are caused by the evil eye while they benefit from exploiting them. Protective talismans and amulets, known as "nazar" or "evil eye charms", are commonly used in Middle Eastern cultures to ward off the effects of the evil eye. These talismans typically feature an eye symbol, often in blue or turquoise, believed to deflect negative energy.

== Traditional and spiritual treatment ==
According to Ibn Sina, Islamic medicine treats mental illness as a somatic ailment, employing various treatments such as baths, massage, bloodletting, leeches, cupping, cautery, music, and drug therapies involving purgatives, emetics, and opium. In addition to addressing mental illness as a bodily condition, there is a widespread belief in the supernatural origins of madness. Individuals often turn to charms and amulets to protect against jinn, the evil eye, and black magic. Exorcisms, conducted by certain holy men, also known as Shaykhs, are prevalent, particularly among the Sufis. Notably, many patients seek treatment in both the medical and spiritual domains. In Saudi Arabia and other countries in the Gulf region, it is common to consult faith healers or Shaykhs before seeking professional healthcare.

=== Comparing Western and Middle Eastern Approaches to Mental Health ===
A comparative study on attitudes toward auditory hallucinations in Saudi Arabia and the United Kingdom revealed significant differences. In Saudi Arabia, some attributed such symptoms to Satan or demons, while others linked them to brain damage or stress. Similarly, in the UK, these attitudes were present, but there was a greater emphasis on stress as a causative factor. Regarding treatment preferences, a majority of Saudis leaned towards religious intervention, while others considered psychological therapy or medication. In the UK, there was a more diverse endorsement of psychological therapy and medication.

== Known syndromes ==
=== Post-traumatic stress disorder ===
Post-traumatic stress disorder (PTSD) is, unfortunately, common in the Middle East due to the myriad conflicts experienced by people in the region. Diagnostic symptoms for PTSD include recurrent experiencing of the initial traumatic event(s) through flashbacks or recurrent night sweats and nightmares. Those afflicted with post-traumatic stress syndrome often seek to avoid others as well as any stimulus similar to the traumatic occurrence. They may also exhibit increased arousal. Difficulty in falling or staying asleep, unexpected episodic fits of anger, and hypervigilance may also occur. The formal diagnostic criteria for both the DSM-IV-TR and ICD-10) indicate that symptoms last for more than one month and cause significant impairment in social, occupational, and/or other important areas of functioning. There is also some evidence that children suffering from PTSD in the Middle East may experience accelerated aging.

=== Depression ===
Depression in the Middle East has been specifically studied at Namazi Hospital Shiraz, in Iran. In a 2006 study of nurses, depressive symptoms were seen in 26.9% of the individuals studied. In this cross-sectional survey, the rate of depression in 130 nurses was investigated using the 21-item Beck Depression Inventory. Data collection also involved individual interviews and follow-up by the research team. Depression has also been found to occur after enduring horrific situations such as war. Witnessing and experiencing such situations creates a sense of hopelessness which develops into depression.

== Different causes ==
In the Middle East, there is a tendency to attribute mental disorders to divine origins. This practice predates Islam and has historical roots in Arabia, Biblical periods, and Ancient Greece. The historical lack of understanding of insanity led to the use of supernatural explanations. Mental health stigma may also arise from a primitive fear of the unseen, particularly because individuals with mental disorders may not exhibit visible symptoms. The unknown nature of mental health illnesses contributes to heightened fear and stigma. Despite scientific data categorizing mental diseases as psychological or physical, supernatural interpretations persist in the Middle East.

Various factors contribute to mental health issues in the region, including sociopolitical unrest, economic challenges, and the transitional phase into adulthood. Instances of wars, mass protests, regime changes, and political instability create an atmosphere of insecurity and economic stagnation, elevating the risk of depression among young adults. Notably, in 2019, Palestine, facing genocide, recorded the highest prevalence, incidence, and DALYs rates of depressive disorders per 100,000 people by age-standardized rate. Demographic shifts in the Middle East, marked by a 'youth bulge,' further complicate the mental health landscape, especially in Egypt. High rates of youth unemployment, particularly among women, have been linked to depression and other mental health challenges.

=== War ===
In ongoing war circumstances like Gaza, where the land is under siege, people are unable to experience normal disorders such as PTSD properly. This is because the traumatic instances are continuously occurring and do not apply to the definition of a "post" traumatic disorder. The Palestinian children being treated for mental disorders have a high chance of relapsing due to the ongoing stress and anxiety that surrounds them.

== Stigma around mental health ==
Even though, Islamic principles are established on getting treatment when necessary. Many in the Middle East continue to view mental issues as God punishing a certain individual. Hardships are perceived as proof that God has a plan for each person, which then leads to people perceiving mental illness as a test from God. Due to religion playing a large role in the Middle East, Muslims often reach out to religious leaders (Imams or Sheikhs) due to their prominent role in society. Due to the implemented importance of other's views, mental health in the Middle East is completely disregarded. An individual could not express their mental issues out of fear of being alienated due to their abnormalness. Children have chosen to struggle silently to prevent bringing shame to their families. Even after experiencing war, refugees from Afghanistan were unable to express their struggles due to the embarrassment that comes with it.

== See also ==
- Cross-cultural psychiatry
- Cultural competence
- Culture-bound syndrome
- Ethnocultural empathy
- Global mental health
- Mental health in China
- Mental health in Lebanon
- Mental health in Southeast Africa

== Sources ==
- Allan, Lyle (July 1983). "A selective annotated bibliography of multiculturalism". Social Alternatives. 3 (3): 65–72. Archived from the original on 2016-02-14.
- Arieli, A.; Aychen, S. (1994). "[Mental disease related to belief in being possessed by the "Zar" spirit]". Harefuah. 126 (11): 636–642. PMID 7926995.
- "Revolution in Egypt's mental health care". BBC News. BBC. 6 May 2009.
- Blainey, Geoffrey (1984), All For Australia, Methuen Haynes, North Ryde, New South Wales, ISBN 0-454-00828-7
- Conflict behind rise in mental health disorders in Somalia, Middle East Online, IRIN, 2010-06-04
- Brody EB (February 2004). "The World Federation for Mental Health: its origins and contemporary relevance to WHO and WPA policies". World Psychiatry. 3 (1): 54–5. PMC 1414666. PMID 16633456.
- Clancy, Greg (2006), The Conspiracies of Multiculturalism, Sunda Publications, Gordon, New South Wales. ISBN 0-9581564-1-7
- Edelstein, Monika D. (June 2002). "Lost tribes and coffee ceremonies: Zar spirit possession and the ethno-religious identity of Ethiopian Jews in Israel". Journal of Refugee Studies. 15 (2): 153–170. doi:10.1093/jrs/15.2.153. Pdf.
- Definition of Society from the OED.
- Hirst, John (2005), Sense and Nonsense in Australian History, Black Inc. Agenda, Melbourne, Victoria. ISBN 978-0-9775949-3-1
- Keonig, H. G. (2000). "Religion and medicine I: Historical background and reasons for separation". International Journal of Psychiatry in Medicine. 30 (4): 385–398. doi:10.2190/2RWB-3AE1-M1E5-TVHK. PMID 11308040. S2CID 6027802.
- Lecture notes on "Defining Society" Retrieved From: East Carolina University.
- Mieder, Wolfgang (2006). ""The Proof Of The Proverb Is In The Probing": Alan Dundes as Pioneering Paremiologist". Western Folklore (Summer 2006). Archived from the original on June 26, 2010.
- Oliver, Myrna (2005-04-03). "Alan Dundes, 70; Folklorist Drew Laughs and Hostility". Los Angeles Times.
- Press Release Mental health needs outweigh resources in Middle East: World Federation for Mental Health 2008 report encourages advocacy for World Mental Health Day, Jamie Read, TBWA/RAAD/PR, Rima Maalouf, C.C.M., Eli Lilly, 10 October 2008
- Okasha, Ahmed (2005). "Mental health in Egypt". Israel Journal of Psychiatry and Related Sciences. 42 (2): 116–125. PMID 16342608.
- Open Directory Project(DMOZ) Middle Eastern Mental Health
- Paniagua, Cuéllar, I., "Multicultural Mental Health," Edited by FA. San Diego, Academic Press, 2000, pp. 225–248
- Paniagua, Freddy A. (2000), "Culture-bound syndromes, cultural variations, and psychopathology", in Cuéllar, Israel; Paniagua, Freddy A. (eds.), Handbook of multicultural mental health assessment and treatment of diverse populations, San Diego: Academic Press, pp. 139–169, ISBN 978-0-08-049142-4.
- Putnam, Robert D. (June 2007). "E Pluribus Unum: Diversity and community in the twenty-first century". Scandinavian Political Studies. 30 (2): 137–174. doi:10.1111/j.1467-9477.2007.00176.x. S2CID 14234366. The 2006 Johan Skytte Prize Lecture.
- Saraceno, Benedetto; et al. (29 September 2007). "Barriers to improvement of mental health services in low-income and middle-income countries". The Lancet. 370 (9593): 1164–1174. doi:10.1016/S0140-6736(07)61263-X. PMID 17804061. S2CID 20954187.
- Sailer, Steve (January 15, 2007). "Fragmented Future: Multiculturalism doesn't make vibrant communities but defensive ones". The American Conservative. Jon Basil Utley. Archived from the original on June 4, 2011.
- Salter, Frank (2007). On genetic interests: family, ethnicity, and humanity in an age of mass migration. New Brunswick, New Jersey: Transaction Publishers. ISBN 978-1-4128-0596-4.
- Sestito, Raymond (1982). The politics of multiculturalism. St. Leonards, N.S.W: Centre for Independent Studies. ISBN 978-0-949769-06-0. Pdf.
- Wong, David (2006). Natural moralities: a defense of pluralistic relativism. Oxford New York: Oxford University Press. ISBN 978-0-19-530539-5. Details.
- World Federation for Mental Health - Official website
- World Fellowship for Schizophrenia and Allied Disorders - 'Information for families caring for people with mental illness'
- WHO. "Mental Health (home page)". who.int. World Health Organization.
- Zonis, Marvin; Joseph, Craig M. (September 1994). "Conspiracy thinking in the Middle East". Political Psychology. 15 (3): 443–459. doi:10.2307/3791566. JSTOR 3791566.

See also: Dorn, Robert M. (June 1996). "Letters to the editor: ["Conspiracy thinking in the Middle East"]". Political Psychology. 17 (2): 353–356. doi:10.2307/3791815. JSTOR 3791815.
