= Mental health in China =

Experts have estimated that about 130 million adults living in the People's Republic of China are suffering from a mental disorder. It is estimated that one in six people in the country will eventually have to deal with mental health issues. The desire to seek treatment is largely hindered by China's strict social norms (and subsequent stigmas), as well as religious and cultural beliefs regarding personal reputation and social harmony.

== History ==
As everything is ineluctably influenced by a complicated web of qi-dynamics, ancient Chinese philosopher–physicians never focused specifically on mental illness as a distinct category. According to mainstream Confucian ethical thought, anyone suffering from a mental disorder would be seen as an anomaly within the otherwise normal order of things. Mainland China's first mental institutions were introduced before 1849 by Western missionaries. Missionary and doctor John G. Kerr opened the first psychiatric hospital in 1898, with the goal of providing care to people with mental health issues, and treating them in a more humane way.

In 1949, the country began developing its mental health resources by building psychiatric hospitals and facilities for training mental health professionals. However, many community programs were discontinued during the Cultural Revolution.

In a meeting jointly held by Chinese ministries and the World Health Organization in 1999, the Chinese government committed to creating a mental health action plan and a national mental health law, among other measures to expand and improve care. The action plan, adopted in 2002, outlined China's priorities of enacting legislation, educating its people on mental illness and mental health resources, and developing a stable and comprehensive system of care.

In 2000, the Minority Health Disparities Research and Education Act was enacted. This act helped in raising national awareness on health issues through research, health education, and data collection.

Since 2006, the government's 686 Program has worked to redevelop community mental health programs and make these the primary resource, instead of psychiatric hospitals, for people with mental illnesses. These community programs make it possible for mental health care to reach rural areas, and for people in these areas to become mental health professionals. However, despite the improvement in access to professional treatment, mental health specialists are still relatively inaccessible to rural populations. The program also emphasizes rehabilitation, rather than the management of symptoms.

In 2011, the legal institution of China's State Council published a draft for a new mental health law, which includes new regulations concerning the rights of patients not to be hospitalized against their will. The draft law also promotes the transparency of patient treatment management, as many hospitals were driven by financial motives and disregarded patients' rights. The law, adopted in 2012, stipulates that a qualified psychiatrist must make the determination of mental illness; that patients can choose whether to receive treatment in most cases; and that only those at risk of harming themselves or others are eligible for compulsory inpatient treatment. However, Human Rights Watch has criticized the law. For example, although it creates some rights for detained patients to request a second opinion from another state psychiatrists and then an independent psychiatrist, there is no right to a legal hearing such as a mental health tribunal and no guarantee of legal representation.

Since 1993, WHO has been collaborating with China in the development of a national mental health information system.

== Current situation ==
Though China continues to develop its mental health services, it still has a large number of untreated and undiagnosed people with mental illnesses. The aforementioned intense stigma associated with mental illness, a lack of mental health professionals and specialists, and culturally-specific expressions of mental illness may play a role in the disparity.

=== Prevalence of mental disorders ===
Researchers estimate that roughly 130 million people in China over the age of 18 suffer from mental illness in any given year.

The map of disability-adjusted life years shows the disproportionate impact on the quality of life for persons with bipolar disorder in China and other East Asian countries.

Conducted between 2001 and 2005, a non-governmental survey of 63,000 Chinese adults found that 16 percent of the population had a mood disorder, including 6 percent of people with major depressive disorder. Thirteen percent of the population had an anxiety disorder and 9 percent had an alcohol use disorder. Women were more likely to have a mood or anxiety disorder compared to men, but men were significantly more likely to have an alcohol use disorder. People living in rural areas were more likely to have major depressive disorder or alcohol dependence.

In 2007, the Chief of China's National Centre for Mental Health, Liu Jin, estimated that approximately 50 percent of outpatient admissions were due to depression.

There is a disproportionate impact on the quality of life for people with bipolar disorder in China and other East Asian countries.

The suicide rate in China was approximately 23 per 100,000 people between 1995 and 1999. Since then, the rate is thought to have fallen to roughly 7 per 100,000 people, according to government data. WHO states that the rate of suicide is thought to be three to four times higher in rural areas than in urban areas. The most common method, poisoning by pesticides, accounts for 62 percent of incidences.

=== Stigma related to cultural and folk beliefs ===
It is estimated that 18 percent of the Chinese population, about 244 million people, believe in Buddhism. Another 22 percent of the population, roughly 294 million, people believe in folk religions which are a group of beliefs that share characteristics with Confucianism, Buddhism, Taoism, and shamanism. Common between all of these philosophical and religious beliefs is an emphasis on acting harmoniously with nature, with strong morals, and with a duty to family. Followers of these religions perceive behavior as being tightly connected with health; illnesses are often thought to be a result of moral failure or insufficiently honoring one's family in current or past life. Furthermore, an emphasis on social harmony may discourage people with mental illness from bringing attention to themselves and seeking help. They may also refuse to speak about their mental illness because of the shame it would bring upon themselves and their family members, who could also be held responsible and experience social isolation.

Also, reputation might be a factor that prevents individuals from seeking professional help. Good reputations are highly valued. In a Chinese household, every individual shares the responsibility of maintaining and raising the family's reputation. It is believed that mental health will hinder individuals from achieving the standards and goals—whether academic, social, career-based, or other—expected from parents. Without reaching these expectations, individuals are anticipated to bring shame to the family, which will affect the family's overall reputation. Therefore, mental health issues are seen as an unacceptable weakness. This perception of mental health disorders causes individuals to internalize their mental health problems, possibly worsening them, and making it difficult to seek treatment. Eventually, it becomes ignored and overlooked by families.

In addition, many of these philosophies teach followers to accept one's fate. Consequently, people with mental disorders may be less inclined to seek medical treatment because they believe they should not actively try to prevent any symptoms that may manifest. They may also be less likely to question the stereotypes associated with people with mental illness, and instead agree with others that they deserve to be ostracized.

=== Lack of qualified staff ===
By the end of 2019, there were 40,850 licensed psychiatrists and psychiatric registrars, averaging 2.9 per 100,000 population, compared to the average in developed countries of 6.6 per 100,000. Individuals without preliminary experience can obtain a license to counsel, following several months of training through the National Exam for Psychological Counselors. Due to limited knowledge about psychiatry, low salary, high workload and stigma towards mental illness, very few medical graduates choose to specialize in psychiatry.

A study in 2015 reported that two-thirds of counties in China lacked any psychiatrists.

=== Physical symptoms ===
Multiple studies have found that Chinese patients with mental illness report more physical symptoms compared to Western patients, who tend to report more psychological symptoms. For example, Chinese patients with depression are more likely to report feelings of fatigue and muscle aches instead of feelings of depression. However, it is unclear whether this occurs because they feel more comfortable reporting physical symptoms or if depression manifests in a more physical way among Chinese people.

=== Misuse ===
There have been multiple accusations that China's psychiatric facilities have been used by government officials to silence political dissidents. Prior to China's implementation to the National Mental Health Law in May 2013, involuntary admission was the most common type of admission for patients with psychotic disorders and required only informed consent signed by family members. Involuntary admission under the reform is only allowed if patients to pose a clear threat to themselves or others, determined through initial assessment by a registered psychiatrist. Despite the law, a 2017 national survey showed that fewer than 50% of involuntarily admitted individuals met the criteria for involuntary admission, with the number of involuntary psychiatric admissions remaining high in China.

== Chinese military mental health ==
=== Overview ===
Military mental health has recently become an area of focus and improvement, particularly in Western countries. For example, in the United States, it is estimated that about twenty-five percent of active military members suffer from a mental health problem, such as PTSD, Traumatic Brain Injury, and depression. Currently, there are no clear initiatives from the government about mental health treatment towards military personnel in China. Specifically, China has been investing in resources towards researching and understanding how the mental health needs of military members and producing policies to reinforce the research results.

=== Background ===
Research on the mental health status of active Chinese military men began in the 1980s where psychologists investigated soldiers' experiences in the plateaus. The change of emphasis from physical to mental health can be seen in China's four dominant military academic journals: First Military Journal, Second Military Journal, Third Military Journal, and Fourth Military Journal. In the 1980s, researchers mostly focused on the physical health of soldiers; as the troops' ability to perform their services declined, the government began looking at their mental health to provide an explanation for this trend. In the 1990s, research on it increased with the hope that by improving the mental health of soldiers, combat effectiveness improves.

Mental health issue can impact active military members' effectiveness in the army, and can create lasting effects on them after they leave the military. Plateaus were an area of interest in this sense because of harsh environmental conditions and the necessity of the work done with low atmospheric pressure and intense UV radiation. It was critical to place the military there to stabilize the outskirts and protect the Chinese citizens who live nearby; this made it one of the most important jobs in the army, then increasing the pressure on those who worked in the plateaus. It not only affected the body physically, like in the arteries, lungs, and back, but caused high levels of depression in soldiers because of being away from family members and with limited communication methods. Scientists found that this may impact their lives as they saw that this population had higher rates of divorce and unemployment.

Comparatively, assessing the mental health status of the People's Liberation Army (PLA) is difficult, because military members work a diverse array of duties over a large landscape. Military members also play an active part in disaster relief, peacekeeping in foreign lands, protecting borders, and domestic riot control. In a study of 11,000 soldiers, researchers found that those who work as peacekeepers have higher levels of depression compared to those in the engineering and medical departments. With such diverse military roles over an area of 8.4 million square kilometres (3.25 million square miles), it is difficult to gauge its impacts on soldiers' psyche and provide a single method to address mental health problems.

Researches have increased over the last two decades, but the studies still lack a sense of comprehensiveness and reliability. In over 73 studies that together included 53,424 military members, some research shows that there is gradual improvement in mental health at high altitudes, such as mountain tops; other researchers found that depressive symptoms can worsen. These research studies demonstrate how difficult it is to assess and treat the mental illness that occurs in the army and how there are inconsistent results. Studies of the military population focus on the men of the military and exclude women, even though the number of women that are joining the military has increased in the last two decades.

Chinese researchers try to provide solutions that are preventative and reactive, such as implementing early mental health training, or mental health assessments to help service members understand their mental health state, and how to combat these feelings themselves. Researchers also suggest to improve the mental health of the military members, programs should include psychoeducation, psychological training, and attention to physical health to employ timely intervention.

=== Implementation ===
In 2006, the People's Republic Minister for National Defense began mental health vetting at the beginning of the military recruitment process. A Chinese military study consisting of 2500 male military personnel found that some members are more predisposed to mental illness. The study measured levels of anxious behaviors, symptoms of depression, sensitivity to traumatic events, resilience and emotional intelligence of existing personnel to aid the screening of new recruits. Similar research has been conducted into the external factors that impact a person's mental fortitude, including single-child status, urban or rural environment, and education level. Subsequently, the government has incorporated mental illness coping techniques into their training manual. In 2013 leak by the Tibetan Center for Human Rights of a small portion of the People's Liberation Army training manual from 2008, specifically concerned how military personnel could combat PTSD and depression while on peacekeeping missions in Tibet. The manual suggested that soldiers should:

“...close [their] eyes and imagine zooming in on the scene like a camera [when experiencing PTSD]. It may feel uncomfortable. Then zoom all the way out until you cannot see anything. Then tell yourself the flashback is gone".

In 2012, the government specifically addressed military mental health in a legal document for the first time. In article 84 of the Mental Health Law of the People's Republic of China, it stated, “The State Council and the Central Military Committee will formulate regulations based on this law to manage mental health work in the military."

Besides screening, assessments and an excerpt of the manual, not much is known about the services that are provided to active military members and veterans. Analysis of more than 45 different studies, moreover, has deemed that the level of anxiety in current and ex-military personnel has increased despite efforts of the People's Republic due to economic conditions, lack of social connects and the feeling of a threat to military livelihood. This growing anxiety manifested in both 2016 and 2018, as Chinese veterans demonstrated their satisfaction with the system via protests across China. In both instances, veterans advocated for an increased focus on post-service benefits, resources to aid in post-service jobs, and justice for those who were treated poorly by the government. As a way to combat the dissatisfaction of veterans and alleviate growing tension, the government established the Ministry of Veteran Affairs in 2018. At the same time, General Secretary of the Chinese Communist Party Xi Jinping promised to enact laws that protect the welfare of veterans.

== Mental health of women in China ==
=== Perinatal depression ===
Perinatal depression, a mood disorder occurring during pregnancy and extending into the postpartum period, is linked with adverse health outcomes for both mothers and infants. A meta-regression analysis showed that there has been a notable upward trend in the prevalence of perinatal depression, which affects approximately 16.3% of Chinese women, with 19.7% experiencing it during pregnancy and 14.8% after childbirth. It indicated a significant inverse relationship between the provincial Gross Domestic Product (GDP) and depression rates among Chinese mothers.

Risk and protective factors for perinatal depression were studied systematically in three domains of mothers, infants, and sociocultural status. Studies shows that lower socioeconomic status, compromised physical well-being, pregnancy-related anxiety, challenges during childbirth and inadequate social support posed negative impact to mental health of Chinese mothers. Conversely, enhanced living standards and increased educational support seemed to confer protective benefits.

After the implementation of the universal two-child policy, another review article indicates that the second-time mothers exhibited a higher likelihood of experiencing anxiety symptoms during pregnancy compared to both prenatal women overall and the entire sample.

The COVID-19 pandemic also proved to affect the mental health and well-being of perinatal women in China. Several studies suggests that the prevalence rates of psychological distress, anxiety, depressive, and insomnia symptoms among of Chinese pregnant women were recorded at 70%, 37%, 31%, and 49%, respectively.

== See also ==
- Chinese Society of Psychiatry
- Geriatric depression in China
- Mental health in education
- Global mental health
- Mental health in the Middle East
- Mental health in Southeast Africa
- Political abuse of psychiatry § China
- Mental health of Chinese students
