= Gil Zalsman =

Israeli psychiatrist and administrator

- גיל זלסמן
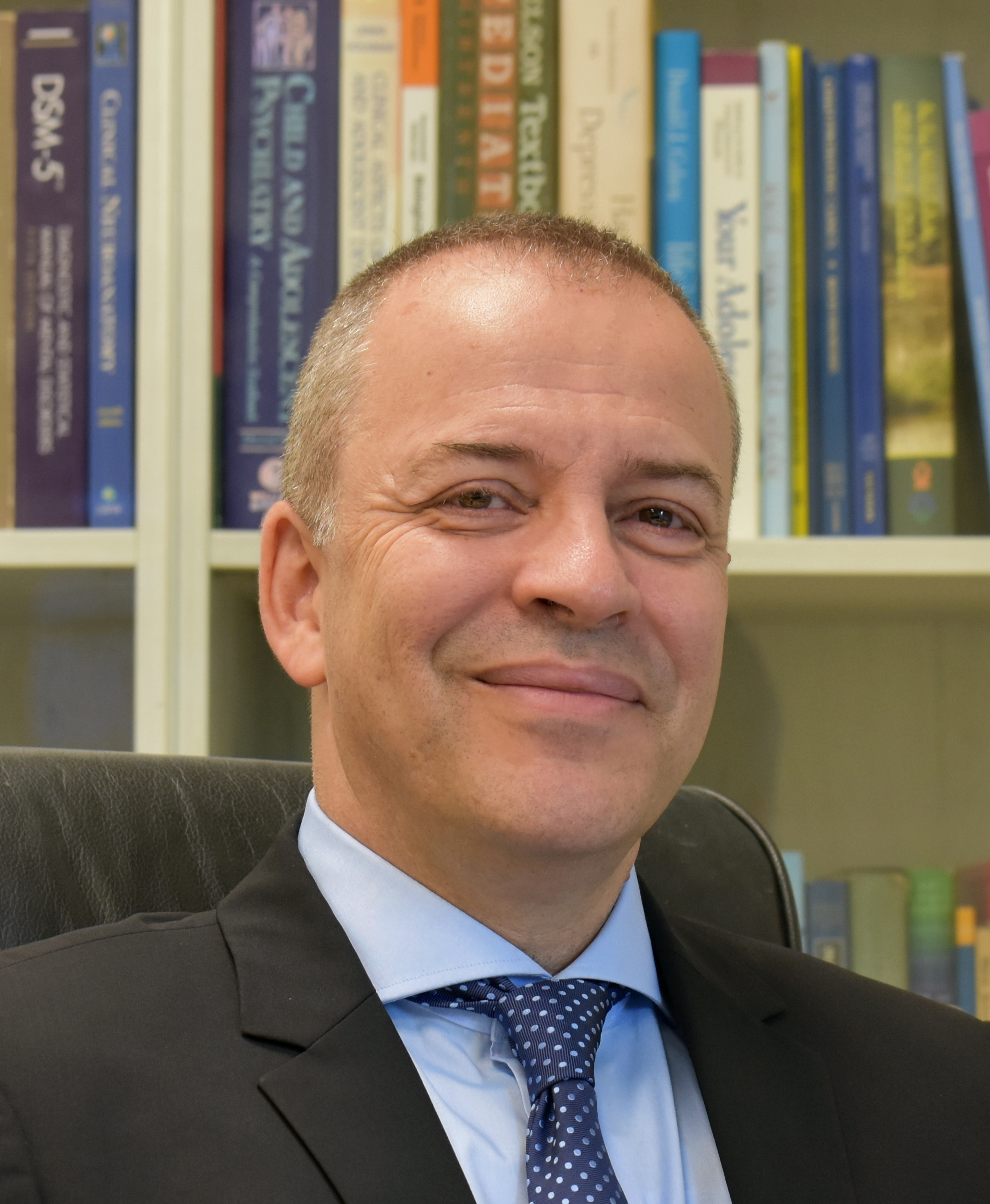
- Zalsman in 2017
- Born: 1964 (age 60–61); Givatayim, Israel
- Education: B.Med.Sc. and M.D. from Hadassah School of Medicine, Hebrew University; MHA from Ben Gurion University
- Known for: child and adolescent psychiatry
- Scientific career
- Fields: Psychiatry
- Institutions: Geha Mental Health Center

Gil Zalsman (Hebrew: גיל זלסמן; born in 1964 in Givatayim, Israel) is an Israeli psychiatrist and child psychiatrist, the Director of the Geha Mental Health Center, Petah Tikva, Israel, where he also heads the Adolescent Day Unit.

== Biography ==
Zalsman was born in 1964 in the town of Givatayim in Israel as the elder among the three children of an Electronics practical engineer and an accountant. He studied medicine at the Hebrew University in Jerusalem. He is a full professor in psychiatry at the Sackler School of Medicine, Tel Aviv University and a former executive committee member of the European College of Neuropsychopharmacology (ECNP), serving as the chair of its educational committee.

Zalsman is the president of the Israel Society of Biological Psychiatry (ISBP) and an ongoing associate research scientist in the Neuroscience Department at Columbia University.

== Career ==
Zalsman's research focuses on gene-environment interactions in childhood depression and suicidal behavior. He has won a number of grants, including:

- Excellent Researcher Award, Israel Psychiatric Association, Israel Medical Association (2001)
- Young Investigator Grant, American Foundation for Suicide Prevention (2005)
- Clalit Health Organization (HMO) research grant (2014)

He has also been recognized for his teaching by the Sackler Faculty of Medicine and the Israel Psychiatric Association (2008–10).

Zalsman has lectured and served various administrative functions at the Sackler School of Medicine and the Geha Mental Health Center in Tel Aviv. He was previously awarded postdoctoral fellowships at the Yale School of Medicine's Child Study Center, the Neuroscience Department, New York State Psychiatric Institute, Columbia Presbyterian Medical Center, and Department of Psychiatry, Columbia University, New York City, NY, US.

Zalsman served on the editorial board of numerous scientific publications, including the World Journal of Psychiatry, Mental Health & Prevention Journal, and the International Journal of Psychiatry in Clinical Practice. He was deputy editor of the Israel Journal of Psychiatry (IJP) and scientific advisor to the American Foundation for Suicide Prevention. He has been a member of the Committee for Research and Development at the Sackler Faculty of Medicine since 2013. He is the president of the Israeli Society of Biological Psychiatry (ISBP) and served on the executive committee at the European College of Neuropsychopharmacology (ECNP).

== Publications ==
Zalsman has published over 200 papers and participated in 170 scientific meetings.
