= Troppenkoller =

Troppenkoller, also called "tropical neurasthenia", "Tropical madness" or "Tropical lunacy", is the term used to describe a condition that some believed affected White European settlers in tropical regions like Samoa. It was based on the belief that the hot and humid climate of these places caused behavioral and psychological changes in Europeans. Wilhelm Solf who was colonial governor of Samoa from 1900 to 1910 believed that Troppenkoller was a symptom of racial degeneration and because of this he discouraged permanent settlement in Samoa. According to Solf settlers who lived in Samoa for longer than 25 years would suffer racial degeneration from miscegenation or troppenkoller.

== Background ==
Historians consider the diagnosis of "tropical neurasthenia" to be the product of colonial anxieties. In the 19th century tropical madness was widely considered an "occupational hazard" for European settlers. There was serious concern and anxiety about Troppenkoller and the ability of colonists to maintain their cultural (and racial) identities.

== Colonial accounts ==
Ludwig Külz (1875-1938) recounted an evening where he became convinced an arrow has flown past his head, which he believed had been fired by a Negro. He was feverish at the time from an insect bite and he said: "I am sure that if by some unfortunate coincidence I had discovered a Negro hunched down in the grass during the course of my ghost chase I would have shot him on the spot." He believed he had been suffering from Troppenkoller (often associated with violence and brutality).

Henry Marshall claimed that settlers in tropical areas suffered a higher rate of neurological disorders. He wrote that madness was "particularly prevalent among the imported inhabitants of low latitudes where the temperature of the atmosphere is high".
