= Middle East =

Transcontinental geopolitical region

Coordinates: 29°N 41°E

- The Middle East (green) combines African Egypt with West Asia, but excludes the Caucasus and includes European Turkey.
- Area: 7,222,411 km^{2} (2,788,588 sq mi)
- Population: ▲469,300,000 (as of 2025)
- Demonym: Middle Eastern; Middle Easterner
- Countries: UN members (16): Bahrain; Cyprus; Egypt; Iran; Iraq; Israel; Jordan; Kuwait; Lebanon; Oman; Qatar; Saudi Arabia; Syria; Turkey; United Arab Emirates; Yemen; UN observers (1): Palestine
- Dependencies: External (1): Akrotiri and Dhekelia (BOT); Internal (1): Kurdistan Region (Iraq); Occupied (4): Palestine; Gaza Strip; West Bank; Syria; Golan Heights; Buffer (2): UNBZC; UNDOF Zone
- Non-UN states: Turkish Republic of Northern Cyprus (Note: The Turkish Republic of Northern Cyprus (TRNC) is a self-declared country that was established after the 1974 Turkish invasion of Cyprus. It is recognized only by Turkey. The international community, including the United Nations and the European Union, considers the TRNC to be part of the Republic of Cyprus. The ongoing Cyprus problem has been a major point of contention in historical Greece–Turkey relations.)
- Languages: Official status (8): Arabic; English (Note: Within Akrotiri and Dhekelia on Cyprus (island).); Greek; Hebrew; Kurdish (Note: Within Iraq's Kurdistan Region and Syria's Rojava-controlled areas.); Persian; Syriac (Note: Within Syria's Rojava-controlled areas.); Turkish
- Time zone: UTC+02:00 to UTC+04:00
- Largest cities: Top 10: 1. Cairo; 2. Tehran; 3. Istanbul; 4. Baghdad; 5. Riyadh; 6. Ankara; 7. Alexandria; 8. Dubai; 9. Jeddah; 10. Amman

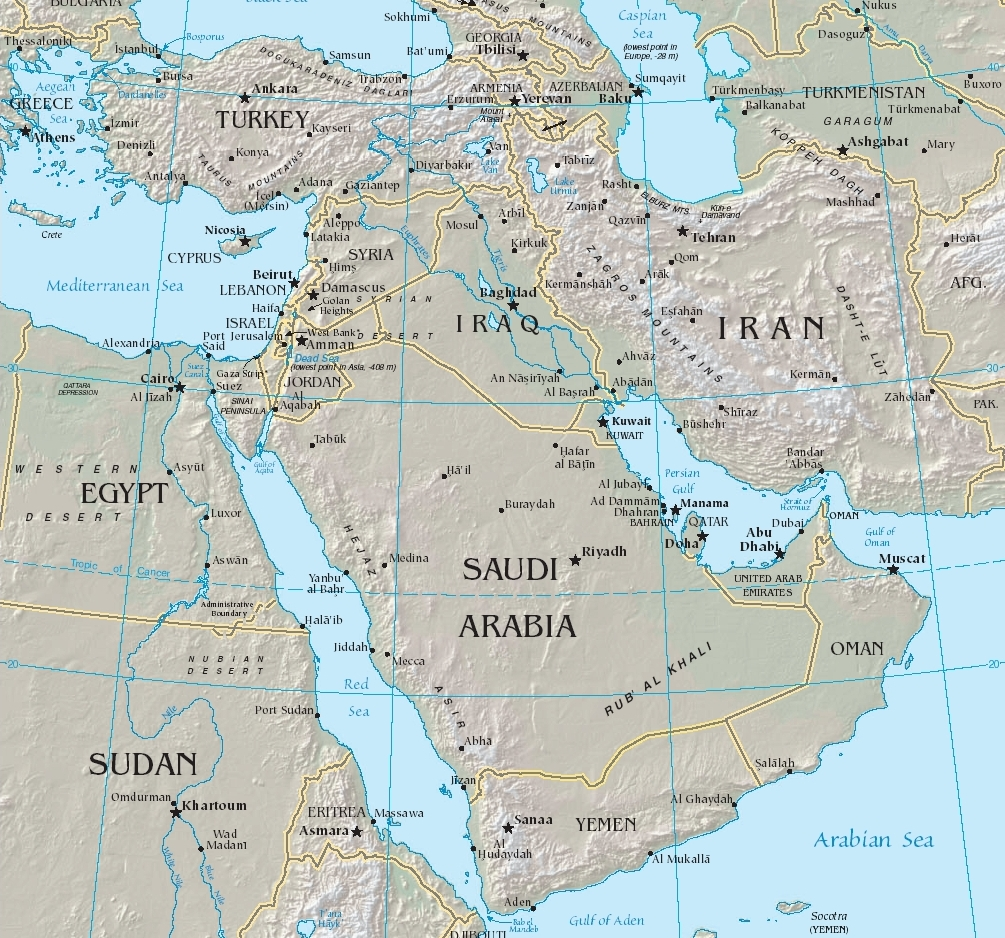
Map of the Middle East between North Africa, Southern Europe, Central Asia, and South Asia

Middle East map of Köppen climate classification

The Middle East (Note: Translations of this term in some of the region's major languages include: Arabic: الشرق الأوسط, romanized: aš-Šarq al-ʾAwsaṭ; Assyrian Neo-Aramaic: ܡܕܢܚܐ ܡܨܥܝܬܐ, romanized: Madnḥā Miṣʿāyā; Hebrew: הַמִּזְרָח הַתִּיכוֹן, romanized: ham-Mizrāḥ hat-Tīḵōn; Kurdish: Rojhilata Navîn; Persian: خاورمیانه, romanized: Xâvar-e-Miyâne; South Azerbaijani: اوْرتاشرق; Turkish: Orta Doğu.) is a geo-political region that is generally defined as encompassing all of Egypt and all of West Asia except for the Caucasus. It roughly corresponds with what was historically referred to in Western Europe as the Near East, which was juxtaposed with the Far East. Unlike West Asia's adherence to continental boundaries, the Middle East is demarcated by following political borders and consequently includes East Thrace in Southeast Europe because it is a part of Turkey. Since the early 20th century, the term "Middle East" has grown increasingly prominent in international discourse, although it is often prone to causing confusion or disagreement on account of vague and changing definitions of what countries and regions it spans. The related terms "Middle East and North Africa" and "Greater Middle East" denote other existing concepts of the region that involve extending the "Middle East" to incorporate most Muslim-majority countries.

Today, the bulk of Middle Eastern countries (13 out of 18) are part of the Arab world. The three most populous Middle Eastern countries are Egypt, Iran, and Turkey, while Saudi Arabia is the largest Middle Eastern country by area. Arabs are the most widespread ethnic group in the region, followed by Turks, Persians, Kurds, Jews, and Assyrians. Significant geographical features or regions that constitute the Middle East are the Arabian Peninsula, Anatolia, the Levant and Mesopotamia (together comprising the Fertile Crescent), and the Iranian plateau.

The history of the Middle East is among the richest ever recorded, as it was the first region to be settled by modern humans outside of Africa and the first region in which writing systems were developed. Situated at the intersection of Africa, Europe, and Asia, the Middle East was home to several cradles of civilization and has been recognized by both local and foreign populations as a region of great strategic importance for millennia. All of the core Abrahamic religions (Judaism, Christianity, and Islam) originated and have their holiest sites in the Middle East.

Most parts of the Middle East exhibit a hot and arid climate, especially in the Arabian and Egyptian regions. However, a number of major rivers provide irrigation to support agriculture in certain areas, such as the Nile in Egypt, the Tigris and the Euphrates in Mesopotamia, and the Jordan River in the Levant. Conversely, the Levantine coast and most of Turkey collectively boast a relatively temperate Mediterranean climate, which yields dry summers with cool and wet winters. A group of Middle Eastern countries that are located along the Persian Gulf—commonly called the Gulf Arab states—have vast reserves of petroleum, which has served as a critical economic resource and accordingly influenced regional politics. Owing to the Middle East's aridity and pervasive dependence on the fossil fuel industry, it is one of the most vulnerable regions to climate change and water scarcity.

== Terminology ==
The term "Middle East" may have originated with the India Office of the United Kingdom in the 1850s. However, it became more widely known through the United States, particularly after American naval strategist Alfred Thayer Mahan used the term to "designate the area between Arabia and India" in 1902. During this period, the United Kingdom was vying for influence in Central Asia as part of the "Great Game" against the Russian Empire, which was in the process of conquering the entire region.

Realizing the "Middle East" to be a region of immense strategic value centred around the Persian Gulf, Mahan took the view that, beyond the Suez Canal in British-ruled Egypt, the Persian Gulf was the most important passage for the United Kingdom in the context of keeping in check any possible Russian advance towards British-ruled India. Mahan first used the term in his September 1902 article "The Persian Gulf and International Relations" for the British journal National Review in London.

The Middle East, if I may adopt a term which I have not seen, will some day need its Malta, as well as its Gibraltar; it does not follow that either will be in the Persian Gulf. Naval force has the quality of mobility which carries with it the privilege of temporary absences; but it needs to find on every scene of operation established bases of refit, of supply, and in case of disaster, of security. The British Navy should have the facility to concentrate in force if occasion arise, about Aden, India, and the Persian Gulf.

Mahan's article was reprinted in the British newspaper The Times and followed by a 20-article series entitled "The Middle Eastern Question" by British historian and diplomat Valentine Chirol. In this series, which began in October 1902, he would expand the definition of "Middle East" to include "those regions of Asia which extend to the borders of India or command the approaches to India." After the series ended in 1903, The Times removed quotation marks from subsequent uses of the term.

Until World War II, it was customary to refer to areas centred on Turkey and the Eastern Mediterranean as the "Near East" in juxtaposition with the "Far East" centred on China, India, and Japan. The Middle East was then defined as the area from Mesopotamia to Burma—namely, the area between the Near East and the Far East—which now broadly corresponds with South Asia.

In the late 1930s, the Cairo-based Middle East Command was established for the British Armed Forces. After that time, the term "Middle East" gained broader usage across both Europe and the United States. The Middle East Institute, for example, was founded in Washington, D.C. in 1946.

While "Southwest Asia" or "Swasia" have been presented sparsely as alternatives, the inclusion of Egypt (located entirely in North Africa except for the Sinai Peninsula) among those countries that are counted as part of the Middle East challenges the usefulness of such terms. Furthermore, the core term "Asia" itself is Eurocentric, having been expanded upon from a term coined by the ancient Greeks to refer to contemporary Anatolia.

=== Usage and criticism ===
1957 American film about the Middle East

The description Middle has also led to some confusion over changing definitions. Before the First World War, "Near East" was used in English to refer to the Balkans and the Ottoman Empire, while "Middle East" referred to the Caucasus, Persia, and Arabian lands, and sometimes Afghanistan, India and others. In contrast, "Far East" referred to the countries of East Asia (e.g. China, Japan, and Korea).

With the collapse of the Ottoman Empire in 1918, "Near East" largely fell out of common use in English, while "Middle East" came to be applied to the emerging independent countries of the Islamic world. However, the usage "Near East" was retained by a variety of academic disciplines, including archaeology and ancient history. In their usage, the term describes an area identical to the term Middle East, which is not used by these disciplines (see ancient Near East).

The first official use of the term "Middle East" by the United States government was in the 1957 Eisenhower Doctrine, which pertained to the Suez Crisis. Secretary of State John Foster Dulles defined the Middle East as "the area lying between and including Libya on the west and Pakistan on the east, Syria and Iraq on the North and the Arabian peninsula to the south, plus the Sudan and Ethiopia." In 1958, the State Department explained that the terms "Near East" and "Middle East" were interchangeable, and defined the region as including only Egypt, Syria, Israel, Lebanon, Jordan, Iraq, Saudi Arabia, Kuwait, Bahrain, and Qatar.

Since the late 20th century, scholars and journalists from the region, such as journalist Louay Khraish and historian Hassan Hanafi have criticized the use of "Middle East" as a Eurocentric and colonialist term.

The Associated Press Stylebook of 2004 says that Near East formerly referred to the farther west countries while Middle East referred to the eastern ones, but that now they are synonymous. It instructs:

Use Middle East unless Near East is used by a source in a story. Mideast is also acceptable, but Middle East is preferred.

=== Translations ===
European languages have adopted terms similar to Near East and Middle East. Since these are based on a relative description, the meanings depend on the country and are generally different from the English terms. In German the term Naher Osten (Near East) is still in common use (nowadays the term Mittlerer Osten is more and more common in press texts translated from English sources, albeit having a distinct meaning).

In the four Slavic languages, Russian Ближний Восток, Bulgarian Близкия Изток, Polish Bliski Wschód or Croatian Bliski istok (terms meaning Near East are the only appropriate ones for the region).

However, some European languages do have "Middle East" equivalents, such as French Moyen-Orient, Swedish Mellanöstern, Spanish Oriente Medio or Medio Oriente, Greek is Μέση Ανατολή (Mesi Anatoli), and Italian Medio Oriente. (Note: In Italian, the expression "Vicino Oriente" (Near East) was widely used to refer to Turkey, and Estremo Oriente (Far East or Extreme East) to refer to all of Asia east of Middle East.)

Perhaps because of the political influence of the United States and Europe, and the prominence of Western press, the Arabic equivalent of Middle East (Arabic: الشرق الأوسط ash-Sharq al-Awsaṭ) has become standard usage in the mainstream Arabic press. It comprises the same meaning as the term "Middle East" in North American and Western European usage. The designation, Mashriq, also from the Arabic root for East, also denotes a variously defined region around the Levant, the eastern part of the Arabic-speaking world (as opposed to the Maghreb, the western part). Even though the term originated in the West, countries of the Middle East that use languages other than Arabic also use that term in translation. For instance, the Persian equivalent for Middle East is خاورمیانه (Khāvar-e miyāneh), the Hebrew is המזרח התיכון (hamizrach hatikhon), and the Turkish is Orta Doğu.

== Countries and territory ==
=== Countries and territory usually considered within the Middle East ===
Traditionally included within the Middle East are Arabia, Asia Minor, East Thrace, Egypt, Iran, the Levant, Mesopotamia, and the Socotra Archipelago. The region includes 17 UN-recognized countries and one British Overseas Territory.

Arms	Flag	Country	Area (km^{2})	Population (2026)	Density (per km^{2})	Capital	Nominal GDP, bn (2025)	GDP per capita (2025)	Currency	Government	Official language(s)	Predominant religion
United Kingdom	(Akrotiri and Dhekelia)	Akrotiri and Dhekelia	254	18,195 (2020)	72	Episkopi	N/A	N/A	Euro	De facto stratocratic dependency under a constitutional monarchy	English	Christianity
Bahrain	(Bahrain)	Bahrain	778	1,652,000	2,123	Manama	$48.846	$29,569	Bahraini dinar	Constitutional monarchy	Arabic	Islam
Cyprus	(Cyprus)	Cyprus	9,251	995,000	108	Nicosia	$45.171	$45,409	Euro	Presidential republic	Greek, Turkish	Christianity
Egypt	(Egypt)	Egypt	1,001,450	110,058,000	110	Cairo	$429.645	$3,904	Egyptian pound	Semi-presidential republic	Arabic	Islam
Iran	(Iran)	Iran	1,648,195	87,934,000	53	Tehran	$300.293	$3,415	Iranian rial	Islamic republic	Persian	Islam
Iraq	(Iraq)	Iraq	438,317	46,640,000	106	Baghdad	$264.784	$5,677	Iraqi dinar	Parliamentary republic	Arabic, Kurdish	Islam
Israel	(Israel)	Israel	21,937	10,312,000	470	Jerusalem^{a}	$719.848	$69,804	Israeli shekel	Parliamentary republic	Hebrew	Judaism
Jordan	(Jordan)	Jordan	89,318	11,590,000	130	Amman	$64.909	$5,601	Jordanian dinar	Constitutional monarchy	Arabic	Islam
Kuwait	(Kuwait)	Kuwait	17,818	5,214,000	293	Kuwait City	$172.920	$33,164	Kuwaiti dinar	Constitutional monarchy	Arabic	Islam
	(Lebanon)	Lebanon	10,452	5,354,000 (2025)	512	Beirut	$34.497 (2025)	$6,443 (2025)	Lebanese pound	Parliamentary republic	Arabic	Islam / Christianity
Oman	(Oman)	Oman	309,500	5,414,000	17	Muscat	$117.176	$21,645	Omani rial	Absolute monarchy	Arabic	Islam
Palestine	(Palestine)	Palestine	6,020	5,737,000 (2025)	953	Jerusalem; Ramallah^{a}	$16.017 (2024)	$2,853 (2024)	Israeli shekel, Jordanian dinar	Semi-presidential republic	Arabic	Islam
Qatar	(Qatar)	Qatar	11,586	3,191,000	275	Doha	$217.416	$68,138	Qatari riyal	Constitutional monarchy	Arabic	Islam
Saudi Arabia	(Saudi Arabia)	Saudi Arabia	2,149,690	36,726,000	17	Riyadh	$1,388.676	$37,811	Saudi riyal	Absolute monarchy	Arabic	Islam
Syria	(Syria)	Syria	185,180	21,393,000 (2010)	116	Damascus	$60.043 (2010)	$2,807 (2010)	Syrian pound	Presidential republic	Arabic	Islam
	(Turkey)	Turkey	783,562	86,245,000	110	Ankara	$1,640.223	$19,018	Turkish lira	Presidential republic	Turkish	Islam
United Arab Emirates	(United Arab Emirates)	United Arab Emirates	83,600	11,465,000	137	Abu Dhabi	$621.546	$54,214	Emirati dirham	Federal constitutional monarchy	Arabic	Islam
Yemen	(Yemen)	Yemen	455,503	19,375,000	43	Sanaa^{b} Aden (provisional)	$7.435	$384	Yemeni rial	Provisional presidential republic	Arabic	Islam

a. Jerusalem is the proclaimed capital of Israel, which is disputed, and the actual location of the Knesset, Israeli Supreme Court, and other governmental institutions of Israel. Ramallah is the actual location of the government of Palestine, whereas the proclaimed capital of Palestine is East Jerusalem, which is disputed.
b. Controlled by the Houthis due to the ongoing civil war. Seat of government moved to Aden.

=== Other definitions of the Middle East ===
Various concepts are often paralleled to the Middle East, most notably the Near East, Fertile Crescent, and Levant. These are geographical concepts, which refer to large sections of the modern-day Middle East, with the Near East being the closest to the Middle East in its geographical meaning. Due to it primarily being Arabic speaking, the Maghreb region of North Africa is sometimes included.

"Greater Middle East" is a political term coined by the second Bush administration in the first decade of the 21st century to denote various countries, pertaining to the Muslim world, specifically Afghanistan, Iran, Pakistan, and Turkey. Various Central Asian countries are sometimes also included.

== History ==
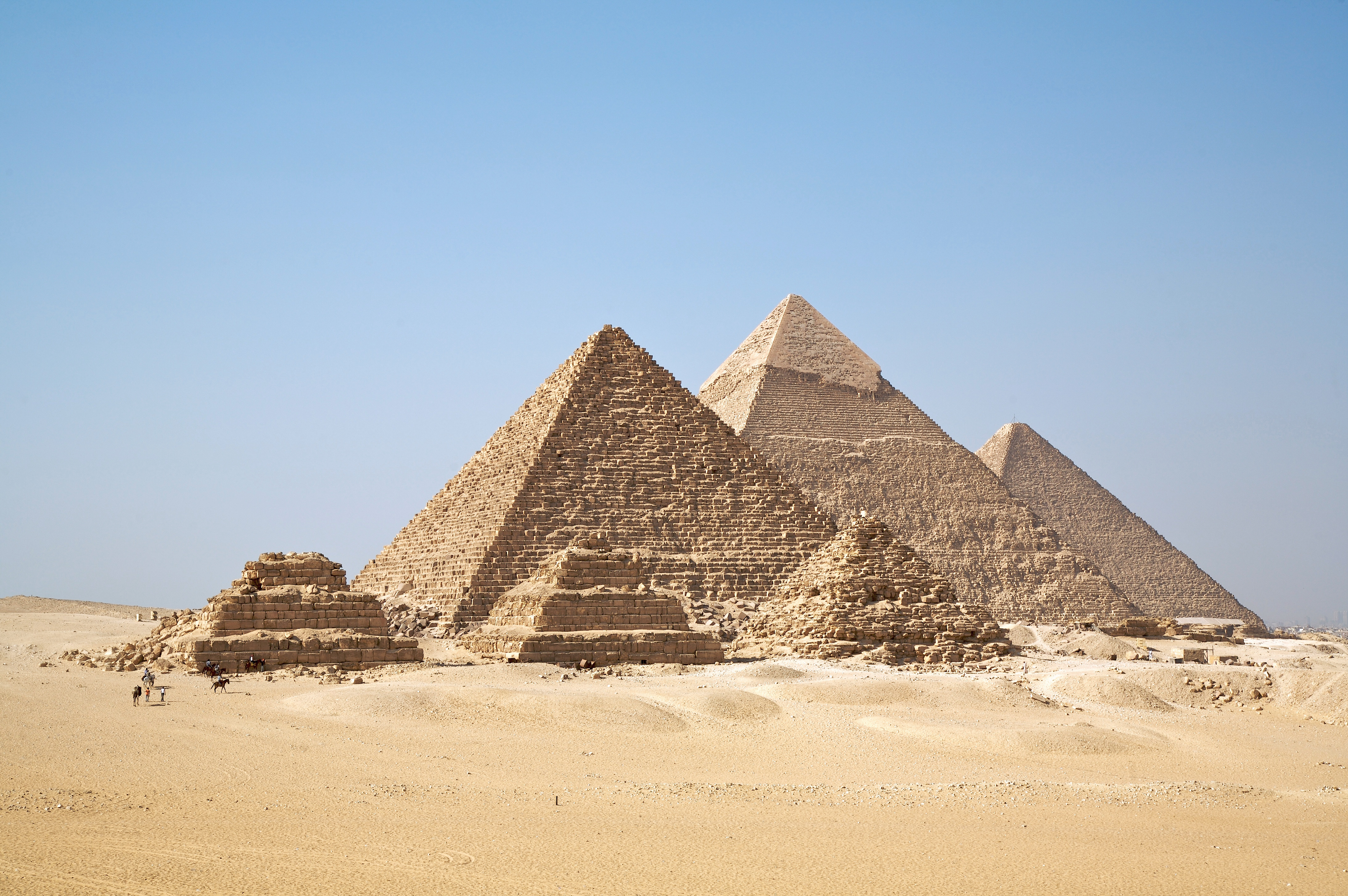
Giza Pyramid complex in Egypt. Built during the Fourth Dynasty of the Old Kingdom of ancient Egypt, between c. 2600 – c. 2500 BC.

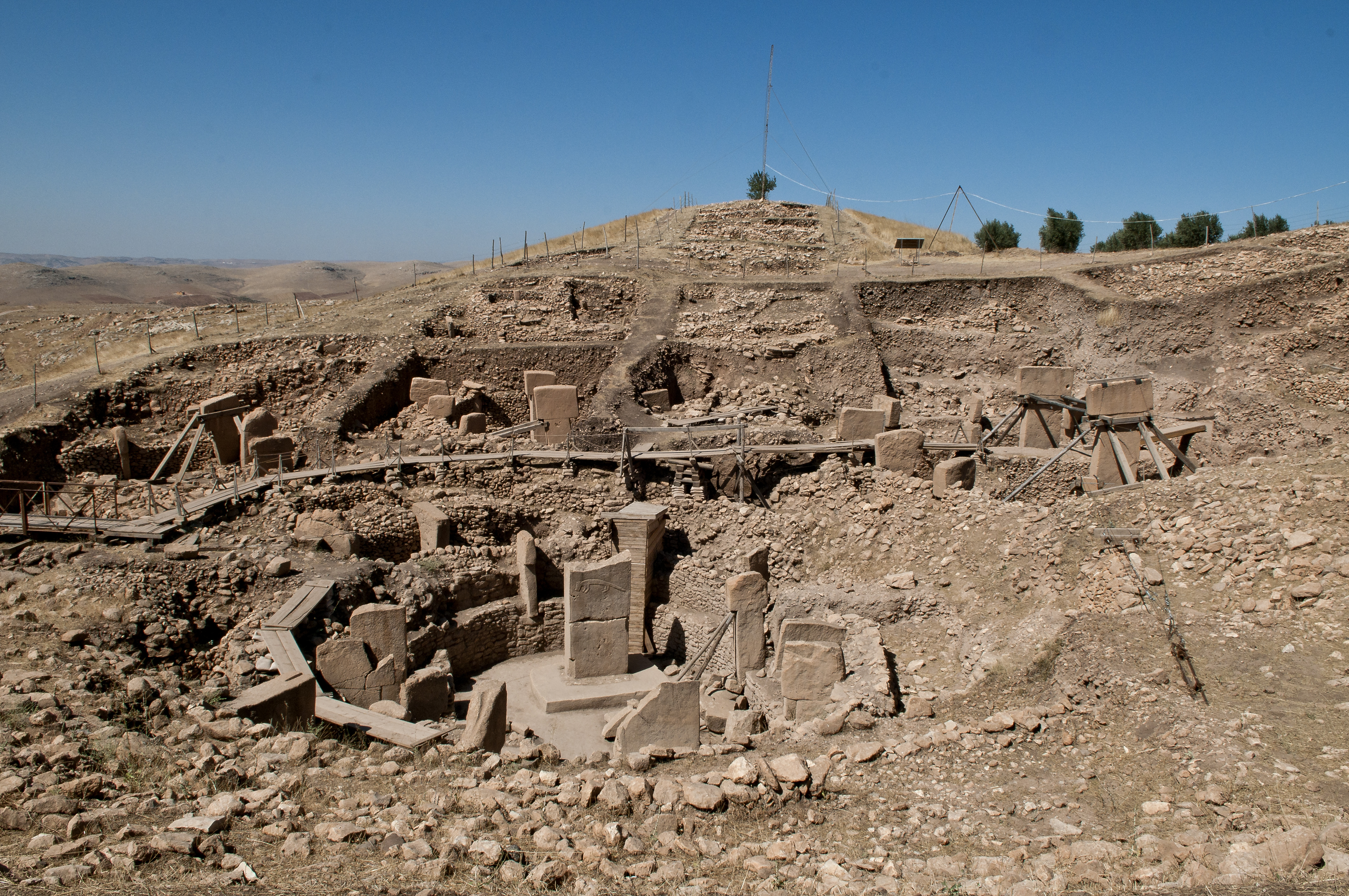
Some henges at Göbekli Tepe were erected as far back as 9600 BC, predating those of Stonehenge, England, by over seven millennia. The site of the oldest known religious structure created by humans.

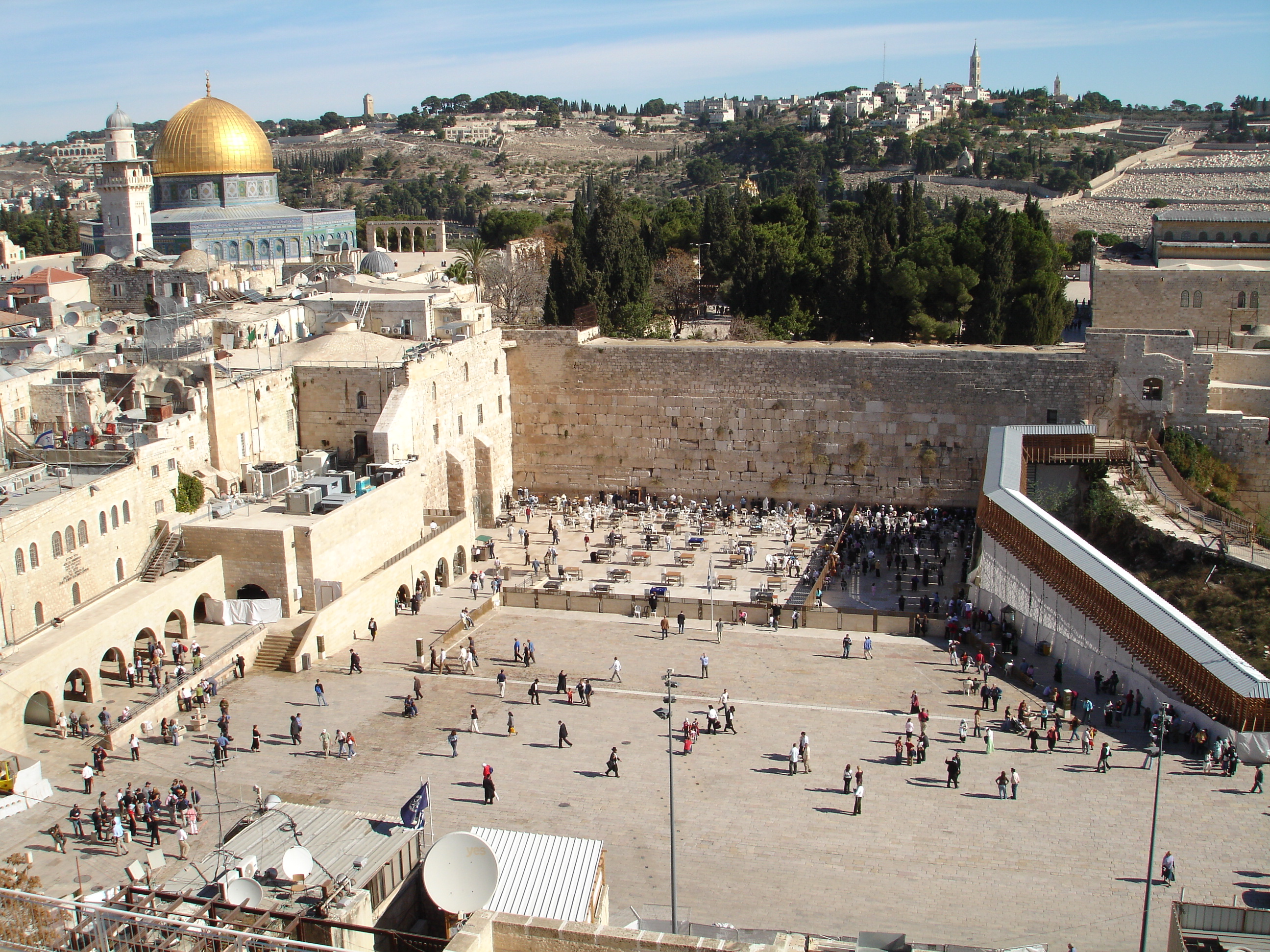
Western Wall and Dome of the Rock in Jerusalem

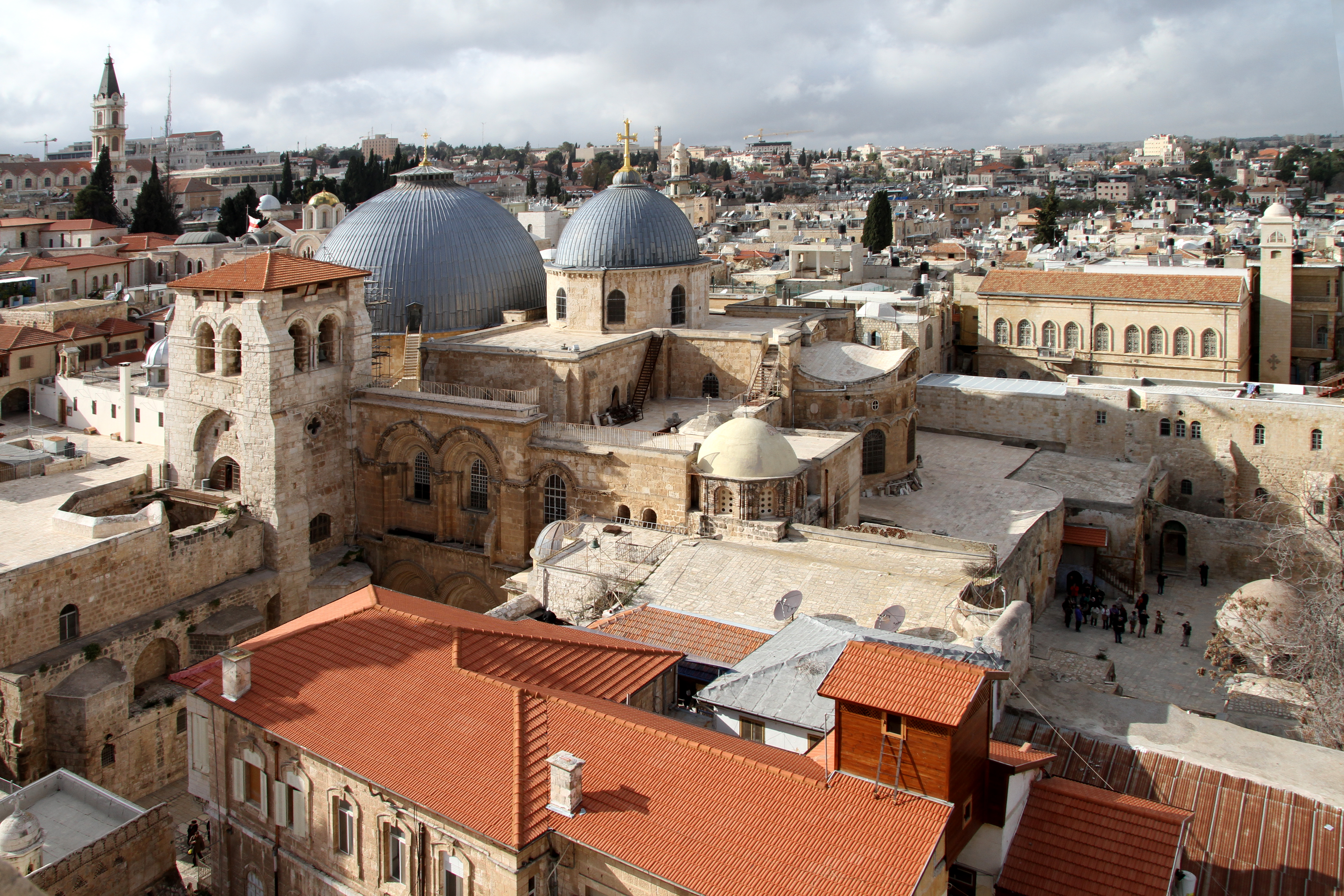
Church of the Holy Sepulchre in Jerusalem

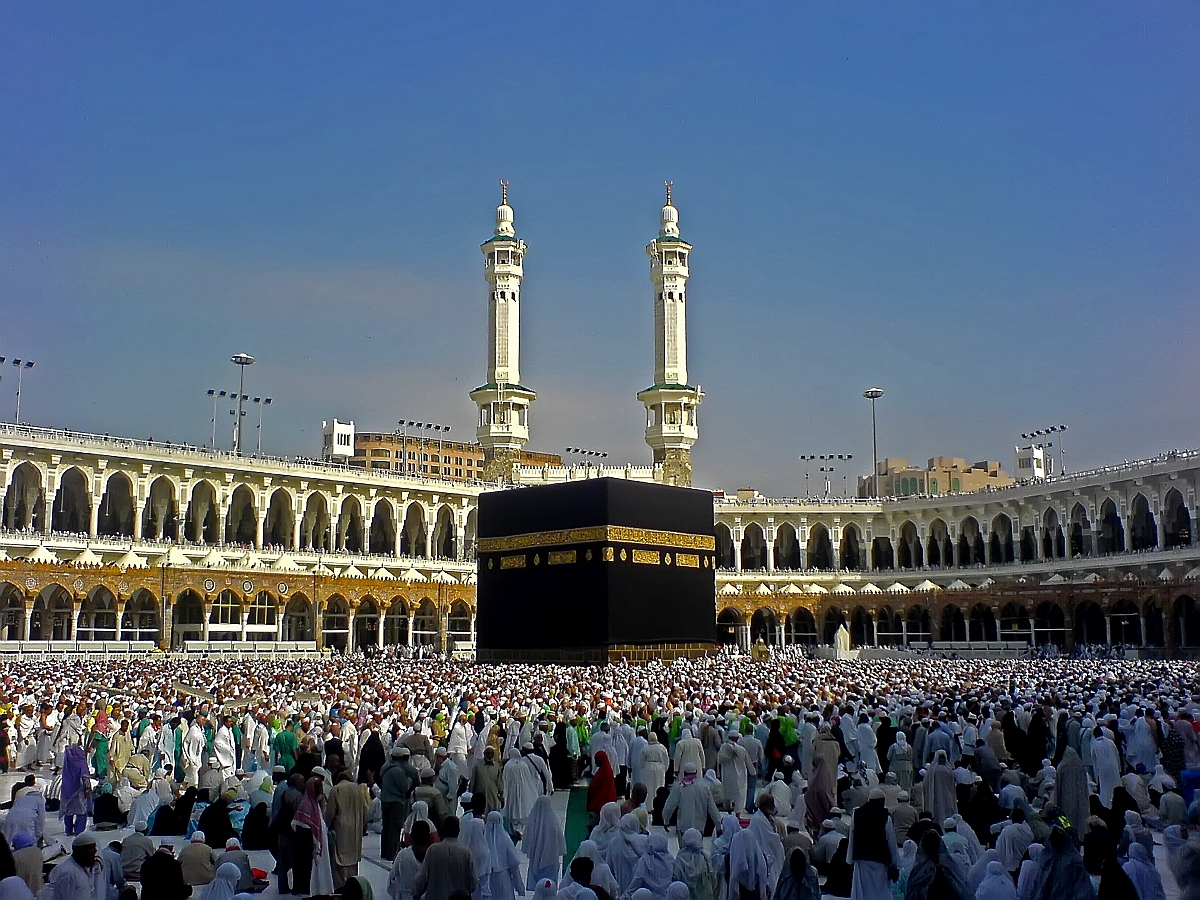
The Kaaba, located in Mecca, Saudi Arabia

The Middle East lies at the juncture of Africa and Eurasia and of the Indian Ocean and the Mediterranean Sea (see also: Indo-Mediterranean). It is the birthplace and spiritual center of religions such as Christianity, Islam, Judaism, Manichaeism, Yezidi, Druze, Yarsan, and Mandeanism, and in Iran, Mithraism, Zoroastrianism, Manicheanism, and the Baháʼí Faith. Throughout its history the Middle East has been a major center of world affairs; a strategically, economically, politically, culturally, and religiously sensitive area. The region is one of the regions where agriculture was independently discovered, and from the Middle East it was spread, during the Neolithic, to different regions of the world such as Europe, the Indus Valley and Eastern Africa.

Prior to the formation of civilizations, advanced cultures formed all over the Middle East during the Stone Age. The search for agricultural lands by agriculturalists, and pastoral lands by herdsmen meant different migrations took place within the region and shaped its ethnic and demographic makeup.

The Middle East is widely and most famously known as the cradle of civilization. The world's earliest civilizations, Mesopotamia (Sumer, Akkad, Assyria, and Babylonia), ancient Egypt and Kish in the Levant, all originated in the Fertile Crescent and Nile Valley regions of the ancient Near East. These were followed by the Hittite, Greek, Hurrian and Urartian civilisations of Asia Minor; Elam, Persia and Median civilizations in Iran, as well as the civilizations of the Levant (such as Ebla, Mari, Nagar, Ugarit, Canaan, Aramea, Mitanni, Phoenicia, and Israel) and the Arabian Peninsula (Magan, Sheba, Ubar). The Near East was first largely unified under the Neo Assyrian Empire, then the Achaemenid Empire followed later by the Macedonian Empire and after this to some degree by the Iranian empires (namely the Parthian and Sasanian Empires), the Roman Empire, and the Byzantine Empire. The region served as the intellectual and economic center of the Roman Empire and played an exceptionally important role due to its periphery on the Sasanian Empire. Thus, the Romans stationed up to five or six of their legions in the region for the sole purpose of defending it from Sasanian and Bedouin raids and invasions.

From the 4th century CE onward, the Middle East became the center of the two main powers at the time, the Byzantine Empire and the Sasanian Empire. However, it would be the later Islamic Caliphates of the Middle Ages, or Islamic Golden Age which began with the Islamic conquest of the region in the 7th century AD, that would first unify the entire Middle East as a distinct region and create the dominant Islamic Arab ethnic identity that largely (but not exclusively) persists today. The 4 caliphates that dominated the Middle East for more than 600 years were the Rashidun Caliphate, the Umayyad Caliphate, the Abbasid Caliphate, and the Fatimid Caliphate. Additionally, the Mongols would come to dominate the region, the Kingdom of Armenia would incorporate parts of the region to their domain, the Seljuks would rule the region and spread Turko-Persian culture, and the Franks would found the Crusader states that would stand for roughly two centuries. Josiah Russell estimates the population of what he calls "Islamic territory" as roughly 12.5 million in 1000 – Anatolia 8 million, Syria 2 million, and Egypt 1.5 million. From the 16th century onward, the Middle East came to be dominated, once again, by two main powers: the Ottoman Empire and Safavid Iran.

The modern Middle East began after World War I, when the Ottoman Empire, which was allied with the Central Powers, was defeated by the Allies and partitioned into a number of separate nations, initially under British and French Mandates. Other defining events in this transformation included the establishment of Israel in 1948 and the eventual departure of European powers, notably Britain and France by the end of the 1960s. They were supplanted in some part by the rising influence of the United States from the 1970s onward.

In the 20th century, the region's significant stocks of crude oil gave it new strategic and economic importance. Mass production of oil began around 1945, with Saudi Arabia, Iran, Kuwait, Iraq, and the United Arab Emirates having large quantities of oil. Estimated oil reserves, especially in Saudi Arabia and Iran, are some of the highest in the world, and the international oil cartel OPEC is dominated by Middle Eastern countries.

During the Cold War, the Middle East was a theater of ideological struggle between the two superpowers and their allies: NATO and the United States on one side, and the Soviet Union and Warsaw Pact on the other, as they competed to influence regional allies. Besides the political reasons there was also the "ideological conflict" between the two systems. Moreover, as Louise Fawcett argues, among many important areas of contention, or perhaps more accurately of anxiety, were, first, the desires of the superpowers to gain strategic advantage in the region, second, the fact that the region contained some two-thirds of the world's oil reserves in a context where oil was becoming increasingly vital to the economy of the Western world [...] Within this contextual framework, the United States sought to divert the Arab world from Soviet influence. Throughout the 20th and 21st centuries, the region has experienced both periods of relative peace and tolerance and periods of conflict particularly between Sunnis and Shiites.

== Geography ==
=== Climate change ===
Climate classification maps for the Middle East at present (top) and predicted for North Africa for 2071–2100 under the most intense climate change scenario (bottom). Mid-range scenarios are currently considered more likely.

In 2018, the MENA region emitted 3.2 billion tonnes of carbon dioxide and produced 8.7% of global greenhouse gas emissions (GHG). These emissions are mostly from the energy sector, an integral component of many Middle Eastern and North African economies due to the extensive oil and natural gas reserves that are found within the region. The Middle East region is one of the most vulnerable to climate change. The impacts include an increase in drought conditions, aridity, heatwaves and sea level rise.

Sharp global temperature and sea level changes, shifting precipitation patterns and increased frequency of extreme weather events are some of the main impacts of climate change as identified by the Intergovernmental Panel on Climate Change (IPCC). The MENA region is especially vulnerable to such impacts due to its arid and semi-arid environment, facing climatic challenges such as low rainfall, high temperatures and dry soil. The climatic conditions that foster such challenges for MENA are projected by the IPCC to worsen throughout the 21st century. If greenhouse gas emissions are not significantly reduced, part of the MENA region risks becoming uninhabitable before the year 2100.

Climate change is expected to put significant strain on already scarce water and agricultural resources within the MENA region, threatening the national security and political stability of all included countries. Over 60 percent of the region's population lives in high and very high water-stressed areas compared to the global average of 35 percent. This has prompted some MENA countries to engage with the issue of climate change on an international level through environmental accords such as the Paris Agreement. Law and policy are also being established on a national level amongst MENA countries, with a focus on the development of renewable energies.

== Economy ==
Venezuela and Middle Eastern countries have the largest proven crude oil reserves.

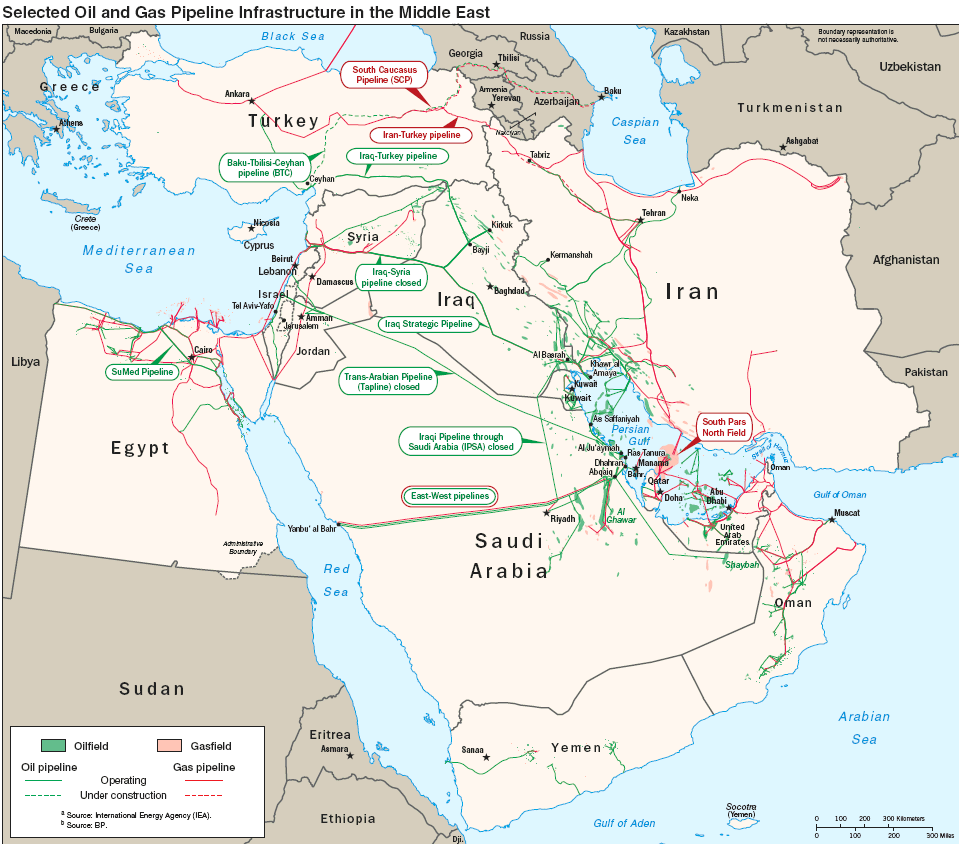
Oil and gas pipelines in the Middle East

Middle Eastern economies range from being very poor (such as Gaza Strip and Yemen) to extremely wealthy nations (such as Qatar and the United Arab Emirates). According to the International Monetary Fund, the three largest Middle Eastern economies in nominal GDP in 2023 were Saudi Arabia ($1.06 trillion), Turkey ($1.03 trillion), and Israel ($0.54 trillion). For nominal GDP per person, the highest ranking countries are Qatar ($83,891), Israel ($55,535), the United Arab Emirates ($49,451) and Cyprus ($33,807). Turkey ($3.6 trillion), Saudi Arabia ($2.3 trillion), and Iran ($1.7 trillion) had the largest economies in terms of GDP PPP. For GDP PPP per person, the highest-ranking countries are Qatar ($124,834), the United Arab Emirates ($88,221), Saudi Arabia ($64,836), Bahrain ($60,596) and Israel ($54,997). The lowest-ranking country in the Middle East, in terms of GDP nominal per capita, is Yemen ($573).

The economic structure of Middle Eastern nations are different because while some are heavily dependent on export of only oil and oil-related products (Saudi Arabia, the United Arab Emirates and Kuwait), others have a highly diverse economic base (such as Cyprus, Israel, Turkey and Egypt). Industries of the Middle Eastern region include oil and oil-related products, agriculture, cotton, cattle, dairy, textiles, leather products, surgical instruments, defence equipment (guns, ammunition, tanks, submarines, fighter jets, UAVs, and missiles). Banking is an important sector, especially for United Arab Emirates and Bahrain.

With the exception of Cyprus, Turkey, Egypt, Lebanon and Israel, tourism has been a relatively undeveloped area of the economy, in part because of the socially conservative nature of the region as well as political turmoil in certain regions. Since the end of the COVID pandemic however, countries such as the United Arab Emirates, Bahrain, and Jordan have begun attracting greater numbers of tourists because of improving tourist facilities and the relaxing of tourism-related restrictive policies.

Unemployment is high in the Middle East and North Africa region, particularly among people aged 15–29, a demographic representing 30% of the region's population. The total regional unemployment rate in 2025 is 10.8%, and among youth is as high as 28%.

== Demographics ==
Maunsell's map, a Pre-World War I British Ethnographical Map of the Middle East

=== Ethnic groups ===
Arabs constitute the largest ethnic group in the Middle East, followed by various Iranian peoples and then by Turkic peoples (Turkish, Azeris, Syrian Turkmen, and Iraqi Turkmen). Native ethnic groups of the region include, in addition to Arabs, Arameans, Assyrians, Baloch, Berbers, Copts, Druze, Greek Cypriots, Jews, Kurds, Lurs, Mandaeans, Persians, Samaritans, Shabaks, Tats, and Zazas. European ethnic groups that form a diaspora in the region include Albanians, Bosniaks, Circassians (including Kabardians), Crimean Tatars, Greeks, Franco-Levantines, Italo-Levantines, and Iraqi Turkmens. Among other migrant populations are Chinese, Filipinos, Indians, Indonesians, Pakistanis, Pashtuns, Romani, and Afro-Arabs.

=== Migration ===
"Migration has always provided an important vent for labor market pressures in the Middle East. For the period between the 1970s and 1990s, the Arab states of the Persian Gulf in particular provided a rich source of employment for workers from Egypt, Yemen and the countries of the Levant, while Europe had attracted young workers from North African countries due both to proximity and the legacy of colonial ties between France and the majority of North African states."

According to the International Organization for Migration, there are 13 million first-generation migrants from Arab nations in the world, of which 5.8 reside in other Arab countries. Expatriates from Arab countries contribute to the circulation of financial and human capital in the region and thus significantly promote regional development. In 2009 Arab countries received a total of US$35.1 billion in remittance in-flows and remittances sent to Jordan, Egypt, and Lebanon from other Arab countries are 40 to 190 per cent higher than trade revenues between these and other Arab countries. In Somalia, the Somali Civil War has greatly increased the size of the Somali diaspora, as many of the best educated Somalis left for Middle Eastern countries as well as Europe and North America.

Non-Arab Middle Eastern countries such as Turkey, Israel, and Iran are also subject to important migration dynamics.

A fair proportion of those migrating from Arab nations are from ethnic and religious minorities facing persecution and are not necessarily ethnic Arabs, Iranians or Turks. Large numbers of Kurds, Jews, Assyrians, Greeks, and Armenians as well as many Mandaeans have left nations such as Iraq, Iran, Syria and Turkey for these reasons during the last century. In Iran, many religious minorities such as Christians, Baháʼís, Jews, and Zoroastrians have left since the Islamic Revolution of 1979.

=== Languages ===
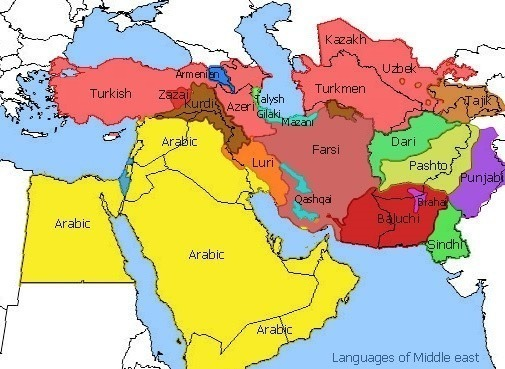
Languages of the Middle East

The six top languages, in terms of numbers of speakers, are Arabic, Persian, Turkish, Kurdish, Modern Hebrew and Greek. About 20 minority languages are also spoken in the Middle East.

Arabic, with all its dialects, is the most widely spoken language in the Middle East, with Literary Arabic being official in all North African and in most West Asian countries. Arabic dialects are also spoken in some adjacent areas in neighbouring Middle Eastern non-Arab countries. It is a member of the Semitic branch of the Afro-Asiatic languages. Several Modern South Arabian languages such as Mehri and Soqotri are also spoken in Yemen and Oman. Another Semitic language is Aramaic and its dialects are spoken mainly by Assyrians and Mandaeans, with Western Aramaic still spoken in two villages near Damascus, Syria. There is also an Oasis Berber-speaking community in Egypt where the language is also known as Siwa. It is a non-Semitic Afro-Asiatic sister language.

Persian is the second most spoken language. While it is primarily spoken in Iran and some border areas in neighbouring countries, the country is one of the region's largest and most populous. It belongs to the Indo-Iranian branch of the family of Indo-European languages. Other Western Iranic languages spoken in the region include Achomi, Daylami, Kurdish dialects, Semmani, Lurish, amongst many others.

The close third-most widely spoken language, Turkish, is largely confined to Turkey, which is also one of the region's largest and most populous countries, but it is present in areas in neighboring countries. It is a member of the Turkic languages, which have their origins in East Asia. Another Turkic language, Azerbaijani, is spoken by Azerbaijanis in Iran.

The fourth-most widely spoken language, Kurdish, is spoken in the countries of Iran, Iraq, Syria, and Turkey, Sorani Kurdish is the second official language in Iraq (instated after the 2005 constitution) after Arabic.

Hebrew is the official language of Israel, with Arabic given a special status after the 2018 Basic law lowered its status from an official language prior to 2018. Hebrew is spoken and used by over 80% of Israel's population, the other 20% using Arabic. Modern Hebrew only began being spoken in the 20th century after being revived in the late 19th century by Elizer Ben-Yehuda (Elizer Perlman) and European Jewish settlers, with the first native Hebrew speaker being born in 1882.

Greek is one of the two official languages of Cyprus, and the country's main language. Small communities of Greek speakers exist all around the Middle East; until the 20th century it was also widely spoken in Asia Minor (being the second most spoken language there, after Turkish) and Egypt. During the antiquity, Ancient Greek was the lingua franca for many areas of the western Middle East and until the Muslim expansion it was widely spoken there as well. Until the late 11th century, it was also the main spoken language in Asia Minor; after that it was gradually replaced by the Turkish language as the Anatolian Turks expanded and the local Greeks were assimilated, especially in the interior.

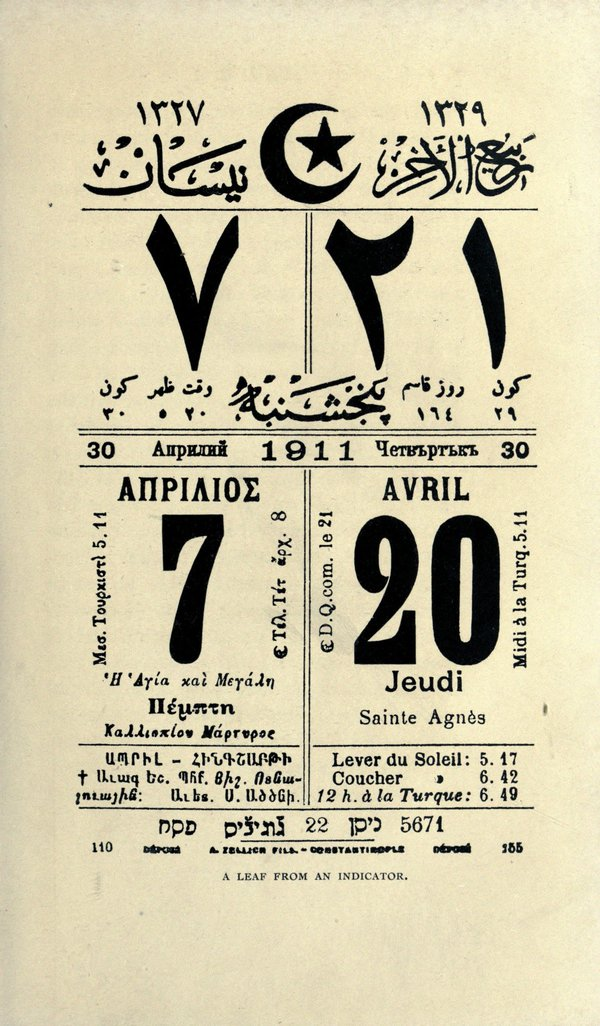
1911 Ottoman calendar shown in several different languages such as: Ottoman Turkish (in Arabic script), Greek, Armenian, Hebrew, Bulgarian, and French.

English is one of the official languages of Akrotiri and Dhekelia. It is also commonly taught and used as a foreign second language, in countries such as Egypt, Jordan, Iran, Iraq, Qatar, Bahrain, United Arab Emirates, and Kuwait. It is also a main language in some Emirates of the United Arab Emirates. It is also spoken as native language by Jewish immigrants from Anglophone countries (UK, US, Australia) in Israel and understood widely as second language there.

French is taught and used in many government facilities and media in Lebanon, and is taught in some primary and secondary schools of Egypt and Syria. Maltese, a Semitic language mainly spoken in Europe, is used by the Franco-Maltese diaspora in Egypt. Due to widespread immigration of French Jews to Israel, it is the native language of approximately 200,000 Jews in Israel.

Armenian speakers are to be found in the region. Georgian is spoken by the Georgian diaspora.

Russian is spoken by a large portion of the Israeli population, because of emigration in the late 1990s. Russian today is a popular unofficial language in use in Israel; news, radio and sign boards can be found in Russian around the country after Hebrew and Arabic. Circassian is also spoken by the diaspora in the region and by almost all Circassians in Israel who speak Hebrew and English as well.

The largest Romanian-speaking community in the Middle East is found in Israel, where as of 1995 Romanian is spoken by 5% of the population. (Note: According to the 1993 Statistical Abstract of Israel there were 250,000 Romanian speakers in Israel, at a population of 5,548,523 (census 1995).)

Bengali, Hindi, and Urdu are widely spoken by migrant communities in many Middle Eastern countries, such as Saudi Arabia (where 20–25% of the population is South Asian), the United Arab Emirates (where 50–55% of the population is South Asian), and Qatar, which have large numbers of Pakistani, Bangladeshi, and Indian immigrants.

=== Religion ===
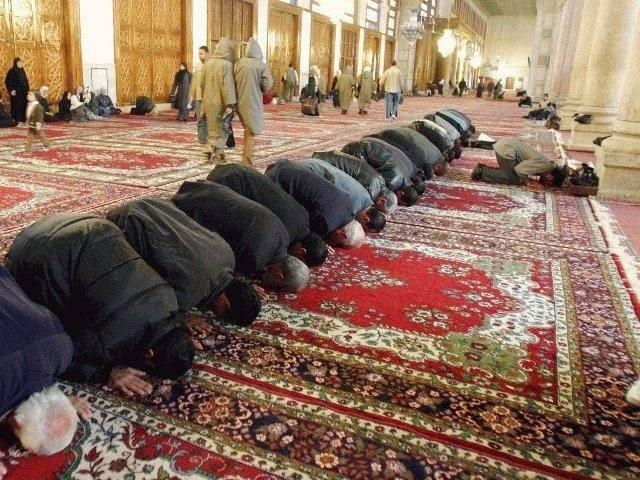
Islam is the largest religion in the Middle East. Here, Muslim men are prostrating during prayer in a mosque.

The Middle East is very diverse when it comes to religions, many of which originated there. Islam is the largest religion in the Middle East, but other faiths that originated there, such as Judaism and Christianity, are also well represented. Christian communities have played a vital role in the Middle East, and they represent 78% of Cyprus population, and 40.5% of Lebanon, where the Lebanese president, half of the cabinet, and half of the parliament follow one of the various Lebanese Christian rites. There are also important minority religions like the Baháʼí Faith, Yarsanism, Yazidism, Zoroastrianism, Mandaeism, Druze, and Shabakism, and in ancient times the region was home to Mesopotamian religions, Canaanite religions, Manichaeism, Mithraism and various monotheist gnostic sects.

== Culture ==
=== Sport ===
The Middle East has recently become more prominent in hosting global sport events due to its wealth and desire to diversify its economy.

The South Asian diaspora is a major backer of cricket in the region.

== See also ==
- Cinema of the Middle East
- Etiquette in the Middle East
- Mental health in the Middle East
- Middle East Studies Association of North America – Learned society
- Middle Eastern cuisine – Culinary tradition
- Middle Eastern music
- Orientalism – Imitation or depiction of Eastern cultures
- Russia and the Middle East
- State feminism § Middle East
