= Mental health of Chinese students =

Level of psychological well-being

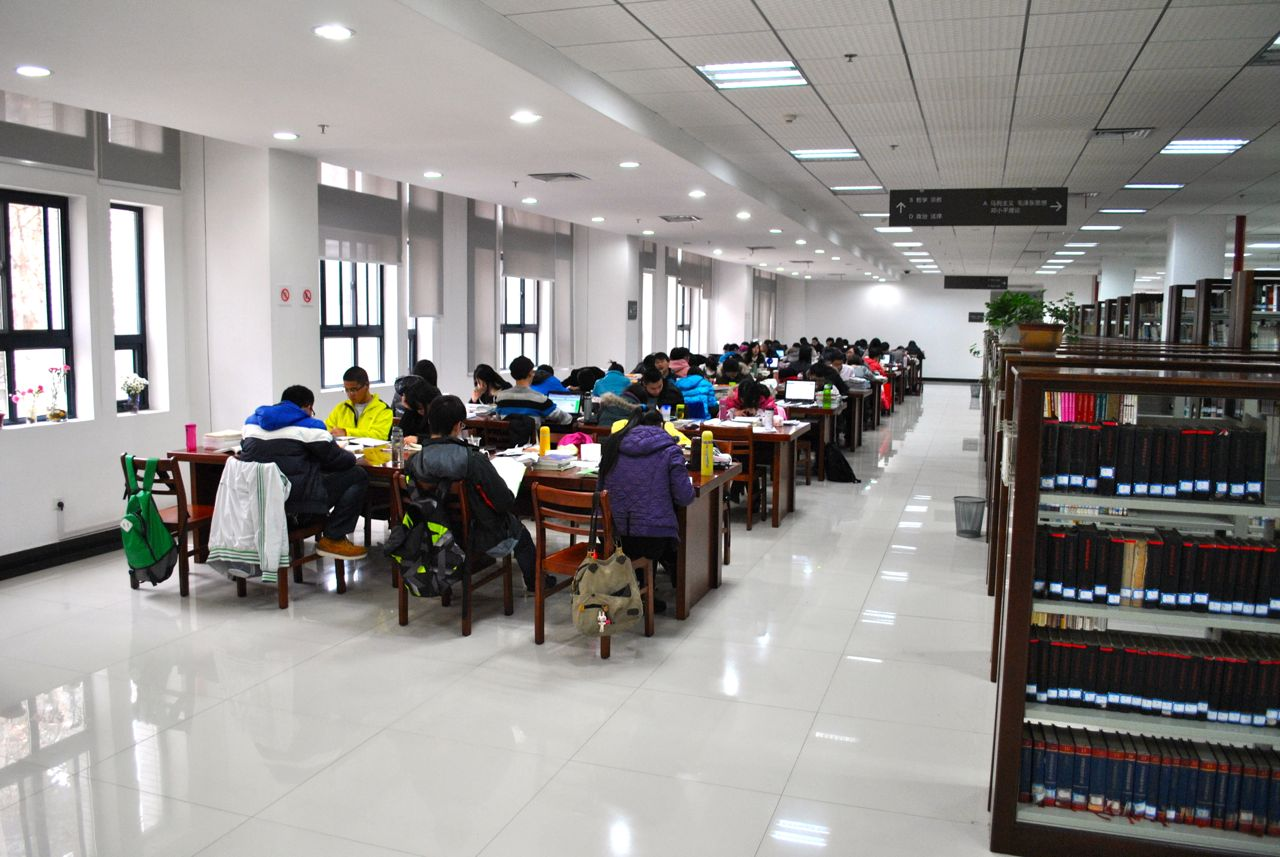
Chinese students at Wuhan University

The mental health of Chinese students is comparatively lower than that of their counterparts in other countries, according to research of self-reported well-being, despite students from China scoring higher on international tests. Contributing factors to this poor mental health include a strong culture of academic achievement, the socio-economic importance of degrees from prestigious universities, competition for white-collar work, the unequal distribution of educational resources, and major income inequalities based on educational outcomes, with a poor social safety net for people who fail academically. These factors create immense social and psychological pressures on students to succeed within the educational system of China.

== Current situation ==
=== Primary and high school students ===
Adolescence is a critical phase for establishing psychological well-being. Adolescents facing mental health issues may encounter challenges in adulthood and are more likely to continue experiencing mental health difficulties as they mature.

Recent social reforms and rapid economic development in China have significantly impacted the mental health of children and adolescents. This includes heightened social stress, increased labor migration, and shifts in family planning, which have altered traditional family structures and social support systems. Numerous studies have suggested that academic stressors, including academic workload, exam failures, interpersonal conflicts, and family financial issues, are the primary sources of stress in the daily lives of Chinese adolescents.

Students encounter various academic demands in school, including exams, competition with peers, and meeting the expectations of teachers and parents, all of which contribute to academic stress. An empirical study using the Middle School Students' Academic Stressors Questionnaire (SSA) to explore academic stress among junior high school (seventh to ninth grade) students in Gansu found that stress often stems from parental and teacher expectations and peer competition; similar results have been observed among Chinese students in other regions such as Xinjiang.

Financial stress and interpersonal stress were also found to have a correlation with Chinese adolescents' wellbeing. Despite that, academic pressure seems to be the predominant stressor.

=== Colleges and universities students ===
The significance of colleges and universities extends beyond individual development, as students' physical and mental health affect both their own personal growth and the nation's future. Consequently, their mental well-being has garnered attention from families, educational institutions, and society as a whole.

A meta-analysis investigated the prevalence of the most common mental health issues among college students in mainland China from 2010 to 2020 via consideration about various moderating factors. Two categories of mental health problems were selected: internalizing disorders encompass anxiety, depression, sleep issues, somatization, and suicide ideation; externalizing issues include non-suicidal self-harm and suicide attempts. The result suggested that:

- Over the past decade, there has been a notable rise in the prevalence of anxiety, depression, sleep issues, and suicide attempts among college students.
- The prevalence rates of various disorders among Chinese college students are as follows: sleep issues (23.5%), depression (20.8%), nonsuicidal self-injury (16.2%), anxiety (13.7%), suicidal thoughts (10.8%), somatization (4.5%), and suicide attempts (2.7%). These findings suggest a higher occurrence of internalizing problems compared to externalizing problems among this demographic.
- Significant regional disparities were observed in the prevalence of sleep issues and suicidal thoughts among college students, indicating poorer mental health in western China and relatively better mental health in northeastern and central regions.

=== International students ===
The influx of Chinese students to the United States surged in the 1980s due to the implementation of the "Open Door Policy." Since then, China has consistently ranked among the top sources of international students in the United States. As of 2011–2012, Chinese students constituted the largest group of international students in the United States, numbering 194,029.

However, as a result of cultural adjustments and transitions, international students have distinct support requirements that increase their vulnerability to various psychological issues. Moreover, Chinese education system prioritizes effort and excellence while demonstrating less tolerance for underperformance. Chinese students are accustomed to early academic competition and internalize these cultural values, potentially influencing their behavior, interactions in class, and responses to academic stressors.

A survey among Chinese international students at Yale University showed that 45% percent experienced signs of depression, while 29% displayed symptoms of anxiety. Additionally, 27% of respondents were unaware of the mental health and counseling services offered on campus. Studies indicated that Chinese students are less inclined to seek formal mental health support compared to local students, preferring instead to rely on informal support from friends. Factors such as self-perceived poor health, a strained relationship with one's advisor, and low physical activity levels were linked to higher rates of depression and anxiety symptoms.

== Other contributing factors ==
=== Academic stress ===
Chinese adolescents navigate a cultural and educational system distinct from that of Western countries. Students in China contend with rigorous academic competitions, such as the national college entrance examination, which begins in childhood. In Chinese society, there is a widespread belief that attending prestigious schools can lead to lucrative careers and long-term happiness for children. However, many Chinese families currently face the challenge of educational anxiety as they pursue these goals. Despite Chinese students' high global rankings in academics, including reading, mathematics, and science, their life satisfaction scores, which are crucial for mental health assessment, are notably low. This trend reflects increasing academic competition, resulting in heightened financial and time investments in education, as well as an upsurge in extracurricular tutoring and a heavy academic workload for students.

=== COVID-19 ===
According to several review studies, the prevalence of psychological distress including stress, anxiety, depression and PTSD symptoms has been notably heightened in correlation with the COVID-19 pandemic. The likelihood of experiencing increased depressive symptoms was notably higher among Chinese students when compared to individuals in other occupational situations such as employment or retirement. The emotional distress stemming from school closures, social event cancellations, difficulties in adapting to remote learning, and exam postponements has been noted to impact students significantly. According to an meta-analysis, approximately 24.9% of Chinese college students experienced symptoms of anxiety during the COVID-19 outbreak. The shift to online learning was reported to bring the challenges, fostering feelings of loneliness, disconnection, and difficulty adapting to new environments. Residing in urban areas, living with parents, and maintaining a stable family income were protective factors against anxiety among college students. Conversely, having a family member or acquaintance infected with COVID-19 significantly increased anxiety risk. Economic impacts also be found to add financial stress for students and families.

=== Rural areas ===
The majority of research indicates that rural children and adolescents experience poorer mental health compared to their urban counterparts. Studies found a higher prevalence of depressive symptoms among adolescents from rural areas compared to those from urban areas. However, some studies produced inconclusive or contradictory results which observed no significant difference in the mental health of college students between rural and urban areas.

A research comparing the general well-being of children left behind versus those not left behind revealed that, on average, left-behind children scored lower on the Pediatric Quality of Life Inventory. Although there were no notable variations in mean scores related to physical health, left-behind children exhibited significantly lower scores in areas concerning psychosocial summary, emotional and social functioning, as well as school performance. A meta-analysis encompassing 1465 left-behind children and 1401 children from intact family environments, indicates a consistent trend that left-behind children tend to exhibit notably elevated levels of anxiety, loneliness, fear, and self-attribution.

== Initiatives and policies ==
In China, the focus on children and adolescents' mental well-being is emphasized through three interconnected policy frameworks: inclusion in national policies, integration into maternal and child health initiatives, and dedicated policies for this demographic. Mental health promotion programs within schools are recognized as effective initiatives. Recent efforts aim to reduce academic stress, notably through the introduction of the "Double Reduction Policy" in July 2021, mandating schools to decrease excessive homework and off-campus training. Primary schools, under China's nine-year compulsory education program, play a significant role in promoting child mental health, with initiatives aimed at achieving widespread mental health education coverage. Provisions introduced in the revised 'Mental Health Law of the People's Republic of China' emphasize the availability of psychologists and counselors in schools at all levels, alongside the requirement for preschools to conduct mental health education. Additionally, schools are obliged to provide psychological counseling and support to students in need. In 2016, various ministries jointly released the 'Guiding Opinions on Strengthening Mental Health Services,' emphasizing the need for improved mental health services across educational institutions.

== See also ==
- Mental health in China
- Mental health in education
- Types of universities and colleges in China
