= Chinese Classification of Mental Disorders =

Psychiatric diagnostic manual

The Chinese Classification of Mental Disorders (CCMD; Chinese: 中国精神疾病分类方案与诊断标准), published by the Chinese Society of Psychiatry (CSP), is a clinical guide used in China for the diagnosis of mental disorders. It is on its third version, the CCMD-3, written in Chinese and English.

The current edition is very similar to the ICD-10, and is also influenced by the DSM-IV,. However, it has a unique definition of some disorders, includes an additional 40 or so culturally-related diagnoses, and lacks certain conditions recognised in other parts of the world.

== History ==
The first published Chinese psychiatric classificatory scheme appeared in 1979. A revised classification system, the CCMD-1, was made available in 1981 and was further modified in 1984 (CCMD-2-R), 1989, and 1995. The CCMD-3 was published in 2001.

At launch, the CCMD-3 was supplemented with the companion book "Treatment and Nursing of Mental Disorders Relevant to CCMD-3".

Many Chinese psychiatrists believed the CCMD had special advantages over other manuals, such as simplicity, stability, the inclusion of culture-distinctive categories, and the exclusion of certain Western diagnostic categories. The Chinese translation of the ICD-10 was seen as linguistically complicated, containing very long sentences, and awkward terms and syntax leading to lack of clarity in interpretation.

A 2014 study found that the ICD-10 was more commonly used by Chinese psychiatrists than the CCMD-3 or DSM-IV.

== Diagnostic categories ==
The diagnosis of depression is included in the CCMD, with many similar criteria to the ICD or DSM, with the core having been translated as "low spirits". However, neurasthenia is a more central diagnosis. Although also found in the ICD, its diagnosis takes a particular form in China, called 'shenjing shuairuo', which emphasizes somatic (bodily) complaints as well as fatigue or depressed feelings. Neurasthenia is a less stigmatizing diagnosis than depression in China, being conceptually distinct from psychiatric labels, and is said to fit well with a tendency to express emotional issues in somatic terms. The concept of neurasthenia as a nervous system disorder is also said to fit well with the traditional Chinese epistemology of disease causation on the basis of disharmony of Zungfu vital organs and imbalance of qi.

The diagnosis of schizophrenia is included in the CCMD. It contains many similarities with its Western counterparts for diagnosis, like the duration of one month, as mentioned in the ICD-10. Some differences include two symptoms different from the ICD and DSM. These are improper affect and delusions, which can range in three different subcategories.

Some of the wordings of the diagnoses are different. For example, rather than borderline personality disorder, as in the DSM, or emotionally unstable personality disorder (borderline type), as in the ICD, the CCMD has impulsive personality disorder.

Diagnoses that are more specific to Chinese or Asian culture, though they may also be outlined in the ICD (or DSM glossary section), include:

- Koro or Genital retraction syndrome: excessive fear of the genitals (and also breasts in women) shrinking or drawing back into the body.
- Zou huo ru mo (走火入魔) psychosis/ fixation or qigong deviation (氣功偏差): perception of uncontrolled flow of qi in the body.
- Mental disorders due to superstition or witchcraft.
- Travelling psychosis.

The CCMD-3 lists several "disorders of sexual preference", including homosexuality and bisexuality, but does not recognize pedophilia.

=== Koro ===
Koro or Genital retraction syndrome is a culture-specific syndrome from Southeast Asia in which the patient has an overpowering belief that the genitalia (or nipples in females) are shrinking and will shortly disappear. In China, it is known as shuk yang, shook yong, and suo yang (simplified Chinese: 缩阳; traditional Chinese: 縮陽). This has been associated with cultures placing a heavy emphasis on balance, or on fertility and reproduction.

=== Zou huo ru mo ===
Zou huo ru mo (走火入魔) or "qigong deviation" (氣功偏差) is a mental condition characterized by the perception that there is an uncontrolled flow of qi in the body through incorrect cultivation practices including meditation. Other complaints include anxiety, psychosis, localized pains, headache, insomnia, and uncontrolled spontaneous movements and convolutions.

== See also ==
- International Statistical Classification of Diseases and Related Health Problems (ICD) of the World Health Organization
- Diagnostic and Statistical Manual of Mental Disorders (DSM) of the American Psychiatric Association
- DSM-IV Codes
- Political abuse of psychiatry in China
