= Mental health in Southeast Africa =

Mental health in Southeast Africa is a concern, where mental illness is prevalent. Mental health issues in Africa are often viewed as the "silent crisis" since they are often given lower priority in a region of Africa where international aid is focused on communicable diseases and malnutrition. Each country in Southeast Africa is consistently confronted with barriers that make mental health policies a challenge to implement, including the lack of policy, social and cultural barriers, the role of traditional medicine, HIV/AIDS, and the stigma surrounding mental health issues.

== Priority of mental health ==
Professor Anyang' Nyong'o wrote a letter on June 23, 2011 to the Kenyan National Commission of Human Rights, stating, "Currently there is a very big gap existing between the mental health needs of Kenyans and the existing mental health services at all levels of the health care services delivery system."

Although there is a lack of attention to mental health in the healthcare systems, it is a major issue in Southeast African countries. Efforts have been made in some countries to allocate funding to mental health initiatives. Uganda's policies are a prime example of a successful effort to improve mental health in Southeast Africa. In 2006–2007, after undertaking an initial situational analysis of Uganda's mental health system, a new mental health policy was created. The vision for the project in Uganda is to eliminate, mental health issues, neurological disorders, and substance use from the population. From this vision, guiding principles were implemented, key priority areas were identified, policy objectives were selected, and the Uganda Ministry of Health began to make mental health a priority. The World Health Organization (WHO) continues to work with the developing nations of Africa to implement strategies to improve mental health situations and treatment in these countries. The few countries that have mental health policies in place, were created prior to 1990, and are in dire need of updating. Uganda had achieved great success with their new mental health policies and is working in close cooperation with the WHO to finalize their health-care policy. The WHO is working to move other countries' mental health policies forward.

== Perspectives ==
The Southeast African Great Lakes region has a long-standing tribal history of traditional medicine and practices. Although some slight progress has been made with the availability of mental health resources in these areas, still many people in rural Southeast Africa utilize traditional methods to treat mental illness. According to Vikram Patel, a global mental health expert and professor at the London School of Hygiene and Tropical Medicine, the stigmatization of mental illness is due to traditional and cultural methods of dealing with these situations and can only be changed through improved support, education, and greater awareness. In traditional Southeast Africa, when there is a situation in which there is a mental health concern, the patient is usually treated without their consent. For an example, if the patient is violent or destructive, he is sedated by the traditional healer or by family members in order to commence therapy, and people are often isolated or treated against their will in order to prevent patients from hurting themselves or others. In a CNN series, African Voices, leading psychiatrist Frank Njenga, states that when a patient has some form of illness such as depression or schizophrenia, community members and traditional healers often look at it as being possessed by demons or witchcraft.

== Causes of mental illnesses ==
Mental illness in Southeast Africa arise from a combination of biological, psychological, and social factors.

Some mental illnesses have been linked to an imbalance of chemicals in the brain called neurotransmitters. These neurotransmitters help nerve cells in the brain communicate. If these chemicals are out of balance or are not working properly, messages may not properly transmit through the brain, leading to symptoms of mental illness. In addition, defects in Traumatic Brain Injury (TBI) in areas of the brain have also been linked to some mental conditions.

Many other factors may contribute to mental illness. These include psychosocial and socioeconomic stressors such as political unrest, violence, poverty, migration, family conflict and any kind of addiction. These may all play a role in the high incidence of mental illness in Southeast Africa. Adequate care may not be available to sufferers, due to the stigma that surrounds people dealing with mental illness. The reversal of this stigma is due to the lack of educational resources for instance laboratories. In Southeast Africa many people have developed post-traumatic stress disorder relating to genocide, civil war, tribal clashes, and refugee situations, poverty. Particularly in Rwanda and Uganda, post-traumatic stress disorder affects a significant number of the population, due to recent conflict, genocide, and crimes against humanity. Adequate care often remains unavailable due to pervasive stigma and a lack of education resources.

== See also ==
- Mental health in China
- Mental health in the Middle East
