= Neurasthenia =

Psychological term

- Pronunciation: /ˌnjʊərəsˈθiːniə/ NURE-əs-THEE-nee-ə
- Specialty: Psychiatry
- Symptoms: Fatigue, lethargy, stress-related headache, insomnia, irritability, malaise, restlessness, stress, weariness
- Differential diagnosis: Anxiety, asthenia, chronic fatigue, fatigue, lethargy
- Treatment: Electrotherapy, rest

Neurasthenia (from Ancient Greek νεῦρον (neuron) 'nerve' and ἀσθενής (asthenés) 'weak') is a term that was first used as early as 1829 for a mechanical weakness of the nerves. It became a major diagnosis in North America during the late 19th and early 20th centuries after the neurologist George Miller Beard reintroduced the concept in 1869.

As a psychopathological term, the first to publish on neurasthenia was the Michigan alienist E. H. Van Deusen of the Kalamazoo Asylum in 1869. Also in 1868, the New York neurologist George Beard used the term in an article published in the Boston Medical and Surgical Journal to denote a condition with symptoms of fatigue, anxiety, headache, heart palpitations, high blood pressure, neuralgia, and depressed mood. Van Deusen associated the condition with farm wives made sick by isolation and a lack of engaging activity. Beard connected the condition to busy society women and overworked businessmen.

Neurasthenia was a diagnosis in the World Health Organization's ICD-10 but became deprecated and thus no longer diagnosable in ICD-11. It is no longer included as a diagnosis also in the American Psychiatric Association's Diagnostic and Statistical Manual of Mental Disorders. The condition is, however, described in the Chinese Society of Psychiatry's Chinese Classification of Mental Disorders.

Americans were said to be particularly prone to neurasthenia, which resulted in the nickname "Americanitis" (popularized by William James). Another (albeit rarely-used) term for neurasthenia is nervosism.

== Symptoms ==
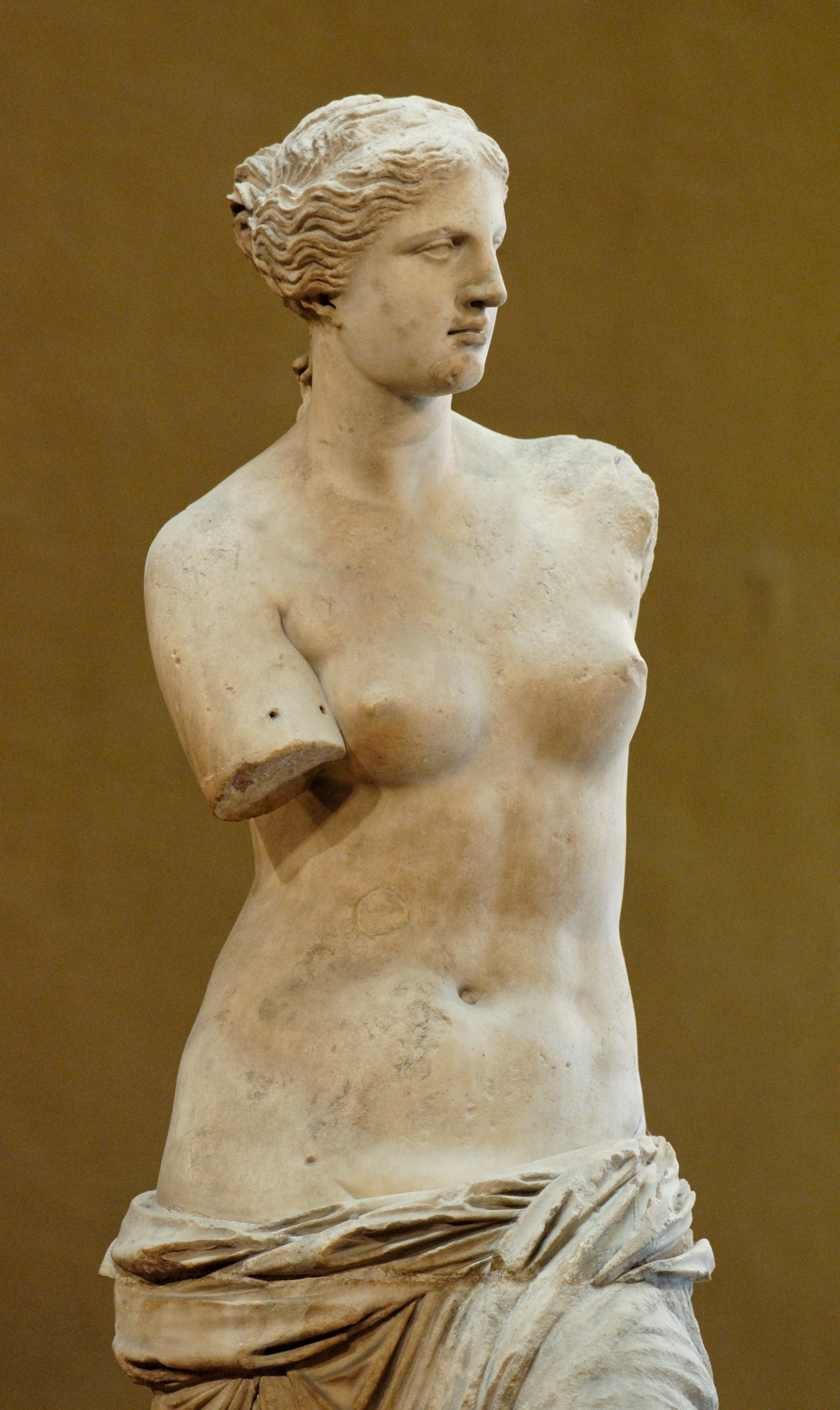
According to a 1922 osteopath, the Venus de Milo was "neurasthenic as her stomach was not in the proper position".

The condition was explained as being a result of exhaustion of the central nervous system's energy reserves, which George Beard attributed to modern civilization. Physicians in the Beard school of thought associated neurasthenia with the stresses suffered by urbanization and as a result of the increasingly-competitive business environment. Typically, it was associated with upper-class people and with professionals working in sedentary occupations, but it could still apply to anybody working within a monetary system.

Sigmund Freud included a variety of physical symptoms into this category, including fatigue, dyspepsia with flatulence, and indications of intra-cranial pressure and spinal irritation. In common with some other people of the time, he believed the condition to be caused by either "non-completed coitus," or the non-completion of the higher cultural correlate thereof, or the "infrequency of emissions", or the infrequent practice of the higher cultural correlate thereof. Later, Freud formulated that in cases of coitus interruptus or of masturbation, there was "an insufficient libidinal discharge" that had a poisoning effect on the organism, in other words, neurasthenia was the result of autointoxication. Eventually, he separated it from anxiety neurosis, but he believed that a combination of the two conditions existed in many cases.

In 19th-century Britain and, by extension, across the British Empire, neurasthenia was also used to describe mental exhaustion or fatigue in “brain workers” or in the context of “overstudy”. This use was often synonymous with the term “brain fag”.

== Diagnosis ==
From 1869, neurasthenia became a "popular" diagnosis and expanded to include such symptoms as weakness, dizziness and fainting. A common treatment promoted by the neurologist S. Weir Mitchell was the rest cure, especially for women. Data from the period gleaned from the Annual Reports of Queen Square Hospital, London, indicates that the diagnosis was balanced between the sexes and had a presence within Europe. Virginia Woolf was known to have been forced to have rest cures, which she describes in her book On Being Ill. Charlotte Perkins Gilman's protagonist in The Yellow Wallpaper also suffers under the auspices of rest cure doctors, much as Gilman herself did. Marcel Proust was said to have neurasthenia. To capitalize on the epidemic, the Rexall drug company introduced a medication called "Americanitis Elixir", which claimed to be a soother for any bouts related to neurasthenia.

== Treatment ==
Beard, with his partner A.D. Rockwell, advocated first electrotherapy and then increasingly experimental treatments for people with neurasthenia, a position that was controversial. An 1868 review posited that the knowledge of Beard and Rockwell of the scientific method was suspect and did not believe their claims to be warranted.

William James was diagnosed with neurasthenia, which he nicknamed "Americanitis", and he was quoted as saying, "I take it that no man is educated who has never dallied with the thought of suicide".

In 1895, Freud reviewed electrotherapy and declared it a "pretense treatment". He emphasized the example of Elizabeth von R's note that "the stronger these were the more they seemed to push her own pains into the background".

Nevertheless, neurasthenia was a common diagnosis during the First World War for "shell shock", but its use declined a decade later. Soldiers who deserted their post could be executed even if they had a medical excuse, but officers who had neurasthenia were not executed.

== Modern diagnosis ==
This diagnosis remained popular well into the 20th century but eventually came to be seen as a mental and behavioural, rather than physical, condition. Neurasthenia had largely been abandoned as a medical diagnosis by the 21st century and is deprecated in the ICD-11 classification system of the World Health Organization.

The earlier ICD-10 system categorized neurasthenia under "F48 – Other neurotic disorders". Under "F48.0 Neurasthenia", the characteristics of the disorder differ among various cultures. Two overlapping symptoms can be present: increased fatigue after mental exertion can be associated with a reduction in cognitive function. Minimal physical effort might be felt as extreme fatigue, along with pain and anxiety. Many other symptoms of bodily discomfort may be felt with either form. Excluded from this disorder are asthenia NOS (R53), burn-out (Z73.0), malaise and fatigue (R53), postviral fatigue syndrome (includes myalgic encephalomyelitis/chronic fatigue syndrome (ME/CFS)) (G93.3) and psychasthenia (F48.8).

One modern theory of neurasthenia is that it was actually dysautonomia, an "imbalance" of the autonomic nervous system.

The American writer Barbara Ehrenreich, restating James's view, considered that neurasthenia was caused by Calvinist gloom and was helped by New Thought replacing the "puritanical 'demand for perpetual effort and self-examination to the point of self-loathing'" with a more hopeful faith.

=== In Asia ===
The medical term neurasthenia is translated in Chinese as shenjing shuairuo (simplified Chinese: 神经衰弱; traditional Chinese: 神經衰弱; pinyin: shénjīng shuāiruò; Cantonese Yale: sàhngīng sēuiyeuhk) or in Japanese as shinkei-suijaku (神経衰弱), both of which also translate the common term "nervous breakdown". The loan translation combines shenjing (神經) or shinkei (神経) "nerve(s); nervous" and shuairuo or suijaku (衰弱) "weakness; feebleness; debility; asthenia".

Despite being removed from the American Psychiatric Association's Diagnostic and Statistical Manual of Mental Disorders in 1980, neurasthenia is listed in an appendix as the culture-bound syndrome shenjing shuairuo and appears in the ICD-10. The condition is thought to persist in Asia as a culturally acceptable diagnosis, which avoids the social stigma of a diagnosis of mental disorder.

In China, traditional Chinese medicine describes shenjingshuairuo as a depletion of qi "vital energy" and the reduction of functioning in the wuzang "five internal organs" (heart, liver, spleen, lungs, kidneys). The modern Chinese Classification of Mental Disorders classifies it as a persistent mental disorder diagnosed with three of five symptoms: "'weakness' symptoms, 'emotional' symptoms, 'excitement' symptoms, tension-induced pain, and sleep disturbances" not caused by other conditions. The American psychiatrist Arthur Kleinman described Chinese neurasthenia as a "biculturally patterned illness experience (a special form of somatization), related to depression or other diseases or to culturally sanctioned idioms of distress and psychosocial coping."

In Japan, shinkei-suijaku is treated with Morita therapy, involving mandatory rest and isolation, followed by progressively more difficult work and the resumption of a previous social role. The diagnosis is sometimes used to disguise serious mental illnesses such as schizophrenia and mood disorders.

== See also ==
- Burnout syndrome
- Chronic fatigue syndrome (ME/CFS)
- Combat stress reaction
- Newyorkitis (satirical)
- Placebo effect
- Psychogenic disease
- Tourette syndrome
- Troppenkoller, or tropical neurasthenia
