= Israel Journal of Psychiatry and Related Sciences =

- Discipline: Psychiatry
- Language: English

Publication details
- History: 1966-2022
- Publisher: Israel Science Publishers on behalf of the Israel Psychiatric Association (Israel)
- Impact factor: 0.789 (2014)

Standard abbreviations
- ISO 4: Isr. J. Psychiatry Relat. Sci.

Indexing
- CODEN: IPRDAH
- ISSN: 0333-7308 (print); 2617-2402 (web)
- LCCN: 82644046
- OCLC no.: 60624313

Links
- Journal homepage; PMID

The Israel Journal of Psychiatry and Related Sciences (also known as Israel Journal of Psychiatry) was a medical journal that published original articles dealing with the biopsychosocial aspects of mobility, relocation, acculturation, ethnicity, stress situations in war and peace, victimology, and mental health in developing countries. According to the Journal Citation Reports, the journal had a 2014 impact factor of 0.789. In 2017, its name was changed to Israel Journal of Psychiatry. In 2022, the journal ceased publication according to SCImago. Its website is no longer accessible.
