= Chinese Society of Psychiatry =

Chinese professional organization

Chinese Society of Psychiatry (中华医学会精神病学分会)
- Abbreviation: CSP
- Predecessor: Chinese Society of Neuro-Psychiatry
- Formation: 1951
- Members: 800 (2005)
- Parent organization: Chinese Medical Association
- Website: csp.cma.org.cn

The Chinese Society of Psychiatry (CSP; Chinese: 中华医学会精神病学分会; lit. 'Chinese Medical Association Psychiatry Branch') is the largest organization for psychiatrists in China. It publishes the Chinese Classification of Mental Disorders ("CCMD"), first published in 1985. The CSP also publishes clinical practice guidelines; promotes psychiatric practice, research and communication; trains new professionals; and holds academic conferences.

== Origins and organization ==
The organization developed out of the Chinese Society of Neuro-Psychiatry, which was founded in 1951. This separated into the Chinese Society of Psychiatry and Chinese Society of Neurology in 1994. Since then, successive committees have run the organisation, currently the 3rd Committee, which started in 2003, whose president is Dongfeng Zhou. The CCMD is now on its third revision.

The official journal of the CSP is the Chinese Journal of Psychiatry (中华精神科杂志). The Society held its seventh annual academic conference in 2006. The Society is a member of the World Psychiatric Association.

As of 2005, the CSP had 800 members.

== History ==
In 2001, the CSP declassified homosexuality and bisexuality as a mental disorder. However, the organization specified that, "although homosexuality was not a disease, a person could be conflicted or suffering from mental illness because of their sexuality, and that condition could be treated", according to Damien Lu, founder of the Information Clearing House for Chinese Gays and Lesbians. Reportedly, this loophole is used to promote conversion therapy in China.

Beginning in 2014, the CSP began collaborating with the McLean Hospital. The purpose of the program is to share research cross-culturally between specialists in psychotic and mood disorders.

== Controversy ==
The Chinese Society of Psychiatrists (CSP) has been criticised for alleged complicity in the government's political abuse of psychiatry towards Falun Gong practitioners—including by detaining individuals via diagnosing adherents as "political maniacs" or with "Qi Gong psychosis". Antipsychotic drugs were wrongly prescribed to practitioners.

In 2004, the CSP agreed on a joint response with the World Psychiatric Association to the allegations. According to the CSP, certain psychiatrists had "failed to distinguish between spiritual-cultural beliefs and delusions" due to "lack of training and professional skills", and this led to misdiagnoses. However, they claimed this was not a systematic issue and invited the WPA to correct the problem.

The WPA stated, "What has become clear... has been the need to assist Chinese colleagues in matters concerning forensic psychiatry, medical ethics, patients' rights, mental health legislation, diagnosis and classification, to help them improve the care of mentally ill in China and prevent future abuses." Arthur Kleinman, a psychiatrist at Harvard University, said he believed the claims about systematic abuse of psychiatry were exaggerated, while acknowledging that it did occur in some cases. Abraham Halpern, a psychiatrist at New York Medical College and board member of the Friends of Falun Gong, USA, criticized the WPA for not demanding an investigative mission in China.

A follow-up review of the controversy was written by Alan A. Stone, a professor of psychiatry and president of the American Psychiatric Association, and published in the Psychiatric Times. Stone determined that psychiatrists in China were generally poorly trained and did not receive the sort of medical training which was standard in the West. Stone said this was cause for the misdiagnoses.

== See also ==
- Mental health in China
- Political abuse of psychiatry in China
