= WSE =

WSE may refer to:

- Warsaw School of Economics
- Warsaw Stock Exchange
- Widescreen Enhanced (16:9 aspect ratio)
- World Standard English
- World Stock Exchange
- Windows Security Essentials, a free antivirus product by Microsoft
- Web search engine
- Web Services Enhancements, an add-on to the Microsoft .NET Framework
- Wall Street English
- Whiting School of Engineering
- Work and Social Economy department of the Flemish Government
