= Baring Private Equity Asia =

Defunct Hong-Kong private equity firm

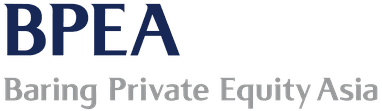
- Type: Private
- Industry: Investment management
- Founded: 1997; 29 years ago
- Founder: Jean Salata
- Defunct: October 2022; 3 years ago
- Fate: Acquired by EQT AB
- Headquarters: Two IFC, Central, Hong Kong
- Products: Private equity Real estate Private credit
- Website: www.bpeasia.com

Baring Private Equity Asia (BPEA) was an Asian investment firm headquartered in Hong Kong. It was founded in 1997 as an affiliate of Barings Bank before becoming an independent firm in 2000.

In 2022, it was acquired by EQT AB to act as its Asian investment platform. It was subsequently renamed to BPEA EQT and then EQT Private Capital Asia.

== History ==
BPEA was founded in 1997 as a subsidiary of Baring Private Equity Partners which was an affiliate of Barings Bank. In addition to BPEA, the affiliates of Baring Private Equity Partners include Baring Vostok Capital Partners, Baring Private Equity Partners India and GP Investments.

Jean Salata and two other senior colleagues from the investment arm of AIG were set to run it with the ING Group providing $300 million in seed money. However, the two colleagues pulled out and ING downsized its commitment to $25 million due to the collapse of Barings Bank and the Asian financial crisis. However, despite the difficult circumstances, Salata recruited a team and deployed capital into NetEase and Mphasis. These successful investments allowed BPEA to raise over $300 million for its debut fund in 1999.

In 2000, Salata led a management buyout of BPEA leading it to be established as an independent Firm. The firm would keep the Barings brand name and the ING relationship in exchange for a share of the profits for a limited period.

In 2016, Affiliated Managers Group acquired a 15% minority stake in BPEA.

In 2017, BPEA launched its Credit investment unit in India after acquiring the Credit unit of Religare Global Asset Management.

In March 2022, EQT AB acquired BPEA for $7.5 billion. In October 2022, the acquisition was complete and the firm was renamed to BPEA EQT.

In January 2024, the firm was rebranded to EQT Private Capital Asia.

== Business overview ==
BPEA mainly focused on the Asia Pacific Region. It had three investment strategies which are:

- Private Equity
- Real Estate
- Credit (operates as BPEA Credit that focuses on India)

== Funds ==
=== Private Equity ===
Fund	Vintage Year	Committed Capital ($m)
Baring Asia Private Equity Fund	1999	USD 305
Baring Asia Private Equity Fund II	2002	USD 257
Baring Asia Private Equity Fund III	2005	USD 490
Baring Asia Private Equity Fund IV	2008	USD 1,515
Baring Asia Private Equity Fund V	2011	USD 2,460
Baring Asia Private Equity Fund VI	2015	USD 3,980
Baring Asia Private Equity Fund VII	2020	USD 6,500
Baring Asia Private Equity Fund VIII	2022	USD 11,200

=== Real Estate ===
Fund	Vintage Year	Committed Capital ($m)
Baring Asia Real Estate Fund	2015	USD 365
Baring Asia Real Estate Fund II	2018	USD 1,000

=== Credit ===
Fund	Vintage Year	Committed Capital ($m)
BPEA Credit – India Fund I	2017	USD 90
BPEA Credit – India Fund II	2019	USD 140
BPEA Credit – India Fund III	2022	USD 475

== Transactions ==
- In 2011, BPEA sold its holding in Hsu Fu Chi to Nestlé in a $1.7 billion deal.
- In 2012, BPEA successfully exited Courts Asia by listing it on the Singapore Stock Exchange.
- In 2015, BPEA acquired a majority stake in Vistra from IK Investment Partners.
- In 2016, BPEA and Onex Corporation acquired the Intellectual Property & Science business of Thomson Reuters for $3.55 billion.
- In 2017, Post Holdings acquired Weetabix Limited, UK based manufacturer of the Weetabix, Alpen and Ready Brek brands of breakfast cereals, from Bright Food and BPEA for $1.4 billion.
- In 2018, BPEA sold its holding in PSB Academy to Intermediate Capital Group.
- In 2020, BPEA and CITIC Capital sold their holdings in Wall Street English to its original founder, Luigi Tiziano Peccenini.
- In 2021, BPEA acquired Virtusa for $2 billion.
