= Double Reduction Policy =

2021 Chinese educational policy

The Double Reduction Policy (Chinese: 双减政策; pinyin: shuāng jiǎn zhèng cè) is a Chinese education policy intended to reduce homework and after-school tutoring pressure on primary and secondary school students, reduce families' spending on tutoring, and improve compulsory education.

The policy, formally titled Opinions on Further Reducing the Homework Burden and Off-Campus Training Burden of Students in Compulsory Education, was issued on 24 July 2021 by the General Office of the Chinese Communist Party and the State Council of the People's Republic of China. The policy was prompted by problems with high-stakes exam-oriented education, including its impact on the physical and mental health of students (e.g., lack of sleep, obesity, anxiety, and suicide).

== Background ==
=== Student stressors ===
The amount of time Chinese adolescents invest in their studies is among the highest in the world. Students in Shanghai aged twelve to fourteen spend 9.8 hours a day on campus studying. Chinese students' average study time commitment is fifty-five hours per week, far above the international average of forty-four. Many students have even more study time through tutoring programs. Due to the competitive pressure of the Senior High School Entrance Examination, junior high students in China's first-tier cities improve their academic performance through extracurricular tutoring. In Shanghai, more than 45 percent of students attend math tutoring classes at least four hours a week, and more than 20 percent spend more than four hours being tutored. Chinese adolescents' tutoring hours during weekends increased from 0.7 hours to 2.1 hours from 2005 to 2015. Students from rural areas attend four-hour evening sessions offered by boarding schools, which can last until 11 pm.

Lack of sleep has become a common trend among Chinese adolescents, as time-consuming homework must be completed after cram school. Research conducted by the Chinese education platform Afanti has shown that 45 percent of students have difficulties finishing homework. 87.6 percent of interviewed junior or high school students (aged 13 to 18) finish homework after 10 pm and sleep for under 8 hours on average. 13.3 percent of primary school students (aged 6 to 12) suffered from insufficient sleep during weekdays.

More homework given during weekdays is positively correlated with a higher proportion of overweight Chinese adolescents. The obesity rate among Chinese children aged five to nineteen exceeded 18 percent in 2016, almost five times the obesity rate of four percent in 1975. Primary school students aged seven to nine have the most significant obesity problem, with rates of 5.7% for boys and 8% for girls. 19.6 percent of Grade 1 students are overweight, and the obesity rate of primary school students in grades 1-3 is increasing faster than that of students in grades 4–6.

Suicide is the leading cause of death among Chinese teenagers. Seventy-nine primary and secondary school suicides in 2013 were linked to the pressure of exam-oriented education in China and fierce competition in schools. 63 percent of the suicides occurred in the second semester, as the Senior High School Entrance Examination and the National College Entrance Examination (高考, abbreviated gaokao) approached. Depression caused by stress is a leading factor in suicide, and more than 10 percent of Chinese adolescents have depression. While 33 percent of suicides among Chinese adolescents are related to family conflicts, 22 percent are directly attributed to study stress. Moreover, China lacks adequate psychological resources for students with psychological problems, which can be difficult for students with mental health problems.

=== Parental stressors ===
Chinese families, influenced by Confucianism and high income gaps between education levels, consider their children's academic performance to be an effective means of achieving upward social mobility. Parents' high expectations can also be linked to the one-child policy implemented in 1979: with fewer children to look to for success and increasingly competitive Chinese workplaces, parents place extreme demands on their children to succeed academically. These pressures, combined with class envy and lower-class fears, lead families to increase their educational expenditures, especially on expensive after-school tutoring.

The high cost of education leads to significant economic pressure on Chinese families. A household survey by the China Institute for Educational Finance Research (CIEFR) showed that Chinese families spent $296 billion on preschool and primary education from 2016 to 2017, even though compulsory education is tuition-free and government-funded. Families in first-tier cities spend an average of 16,800 yuan on education for students during the compulsory education stage. Middle-class parents spent the most in their children's education out of all groups. Middle-class parents want to build 'child capital' through this financial investment in tutoring.

Teachers' requirements can place extra burdens on Chinese parents. In China, some teachers require parents to check and supervise their children's homework. 91.2% of Chinese parents do so. Students and families that fail can be reprimanded by teachers and accused of irresponsibility, increasing stress within the family and familial relationships.

== Policy measures ==
The double reduction policy emphasizes the student-oriented learning mode, which recommends teaching students according to their aptitude and embracing a "cultural approach." Schools now offer courses across a broader range of interests and respect every student's differentiated learning needs, personal strengths, and individuality so that students can achieve well-rounded development, including through after-school services.

The Double Reduction Policy also aims to alleviate the financial burden on families by strictly regulating the tutoring industry and reducing pressure on families. It calls for the development of "home-school cooperative education," which guides parents toward reasonable expectations for their children. At the same time, the school provides after-school supervision to reduce parents' anxiety about tutoring classes and home supervision.

Opinions on Further Reducing the Homework Burden and Off-Campus Training Burden of Students in Compulsory Education specifies the following policy measures to ease students' learning burden:

1. Reduce time spent on homework. The policy sets limits on total homework given: no written homework for 1st and 2nd grades; up to 60 minutes of average homework for 3rd through 6th grades; no more than 90 minutes of written homework for middle school. This piece also contains improvements to homework design, homework support from teachers, and guidance to balance time at home spent on classwork with other activities.
2. Improve after-school services. The policy requests that schools make more time for after-school services, expand channels for separate faculty to carry out these services, and improve the diversity of social and academic activities. It requires that after-school services not be used as additional class time. The policy also strengthens and improves free online study services by region.
3. Regulate extracurricular training and private tutoring. The new policy creates oversight and filing systems for extracurricular training and tutoring institutions, bans the approval of new institutions, and limits and regulates fee collection. On 23 July, The State Council of the People's Republic of China announced that they would no longer issue new for-profit licenses for tutoring institutions and required existing ones to stop tutoring "core curriculum courses" for students having compulsory education. All after-school tutoring institutions became non-profits. The Chinese government also stated this heavy regulation on the tutoring industry aimed to eliminate the unequal educational resource allocation phenomenon.
4. Increase quality of education, enrollment and appraisal: Education departments promote balanced development of compulsory education across regions, hoping to reduce the educational gap between urban and rural students. Primary and junior high schools in China are also explicitly forbidden from ranking students' academic performance or using such rankings for promotion to higher levels of school. The Ministry of Education has emphasized students' personality rights to avoid the negative psychological pressure caused by the public examination ranking. Banning rankings protects students' psychological self-esteem, especially for adolescents still in a fragile growth stage. The abolition of rankings and "frequent formal exams" has improved students' enthusiasm for learning and changed China's long grade-centered and test-oriented education system.
5. Government support, pilots and implementation. The policy sets standards for regional and provincial governments to allocate funds and staff to support its improved procedures. It also details the requirements for pilot work, designates specific cities and regions to carry out pilots, and clarifies departmental responsibilities and procedures.

== Effects ==
=== Tutoring ===
About 15 million people in China were employed in off-campus education and training before the policy was published. After the double reduction policy was implemented, 10 million people experienced unemployment. Overall, the tutoring industry shrunk considerably. The number of offline tutoring institutions decreased by 83.8 percent, while online tutoring institutions decreased by 84.1 percent. The tutoring industry became highly fungible because schools offered a wealth of learning resources in school, and 91% of students attended those activities.

=== Businesses ===
Leading companies in the private education sector including Wall Street English and Juren Education ceased operations.

Former private education companies that remained in business shifted their business models to focus on topics such as adult education or technical education. After having its income drop by 80% and firing 60,000 employees, New Oriental shifted its focus to live-streaming through which former instructors sold goods while giving lessons on various topics.

=== Mental health ===
Sleep deprivation and mental health problems have been slightly relieved after reducing the amount of homework. The rate of students with depression dropped from 9.9 percent to 9.4 percent, and the rate of anxiety dropped from 7.4 percent to 7.1 percent. However, eventually the anxiety may also improve because of the limited sources to help improve the grade. The proportion of primary and secondary school students able to complete their homework at school rose from 46 percent to more than 90 percent, showing that adolescents now have more time to achieve work-life balance.

=== Teachers ===
Under the incentive of the double reduction policy, Chinese teachers were encouraged to modify their educational methods. To enable students to complete their homework with a smaller workload and shorter class times, Chinese teachers consciously started to improve classroom teaching efficiency. The double reduction policy also provided a more "favorable ideological environment" and career development space for ambitious teachers with better teaching abilities. Middle-aged teachers born in the 1970s and 1980s were inspired to participate in research projects and take the lead for younger teachers. Young teachers gained career development opportunities, and their awareness of innovation and advantages in information technology helped them stand out easily.

Still, from 2018 to 2020, many teachers were concerned about the potential increased workload and a lack of protections for their rights and felt occupational anxiety. While teachers still expected parents to take responsibility for supervising their children and actively communicate with teachers, some parents thought that the policy meant that children's education should be solely the school's responsibility. There was also a role conflict: many teachers who are also parents felt that they were unable to take care of their own families because they were busy providing after-school services and designing homework as required after the policy was implemented.

Teachers also had several concerns about academic performance under the policy. Some discovered that the quality of teaching decreases in the short term after reducing the amount of homework. In addition, some schools kept exams and rankings, only changing final exams' names and keeping rankings private, still requiring teachers to improve students' scores. Some worried that reduced homework would harm students' academic performance in the long term as education remained exam-oriented. Especially when dealing with large class sizes, teachers also had difficulties designing flexible homework suitable for different students. Many teachers began to doubt their teaching ability and showed low self-efficacy. Moreover, some teachers believed personalized homework would make it harder to understand the differences between their students' academic levels.

=== Birth rate ===
According to a 2025 study, the ban increased expected total fertility rate by 7% to 8%.

== Reception ==
A review of posts on Weibo showed a mix of positive and negative responses. Among the positive topics of public concern, 45.9% discussed educational equity. The public believed the double reduction policy could effectively solve the long-standing unequal distribution of educational resources. The prominent negative topics the public mentioned were policy influence and "industry impact," mainly discussing problems such as the bankruptcies of tutoring institutions.

The subjects participating in the Weibo discussion were mainly students, parents, tutoring institutions, and teachers. Teachers discussed their frustration with the increased workload without a change in income. Some teachers expressed sadness, confusion, and fear about their future personal development and the breaking of their teaching habits. Many "self-media accounts" and "education opinion leaders" expressed negative and skeptical opinions towards the double-reduction policy, influencing public understanding.

Some parents complained about how hard it was to get tuition fees back after the double reduction policy's crackdown on tutoring institutions. On Zhihu, parents' comments opposed the double reduction policy. They argued that the policy did not decrease parents' demand for tutoring classes, and they only increased prices and created a larger educational resource gap. Some worried that the closure of private institutes would increase the pressure on parents to supervise academic performance. Some felt that the double reduction policy was just a product of the Chinese government to encourage fertility. Others believed that competition among students still existed.

== See also ==
- Tutoring
- Education in China
- Education inequality in China
