= Offshore fund =

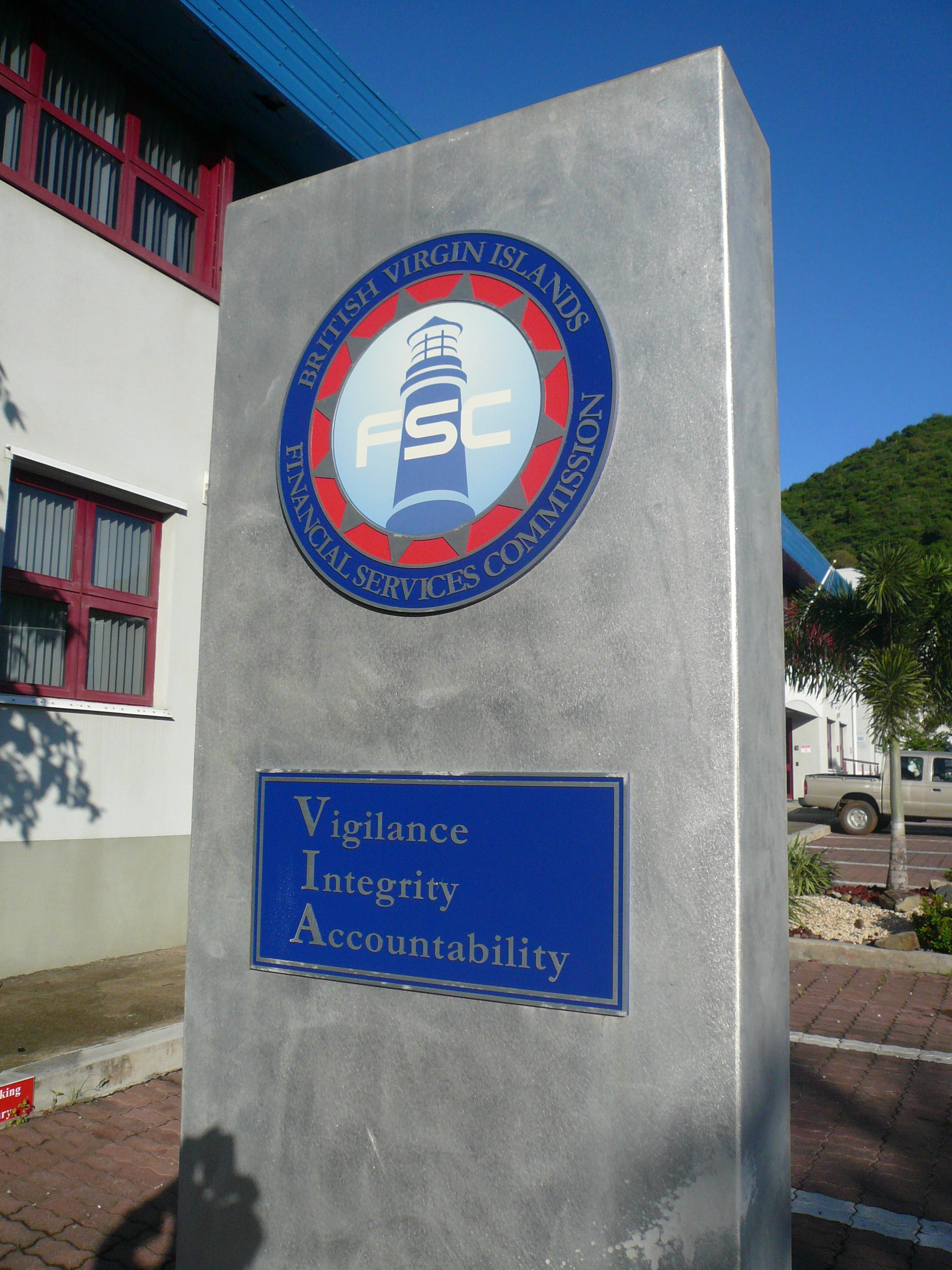
The British Virgin Islands Financial Services Commission has responsibility for oversight of investment funds in that jurisdiction.

An offshore fund is generally a collective investment scheme domiciled in an offshore jurisdiction. Like the term "offshore company", the term is more descriptive than definitive, and both the words 'offshore' and 'fund' may be construed differently.

The reference to offshore, in the classic case, usually means a traditional offshore jurisdiction such as the Cayman Islands, Jersey or the British Virgin Islands. However, the term is also frequently used to include other corporate domiciles popular for cross border investment structuring, such as Delaware and Luxembourg. In the widest sense, offshore is sometimes used to include any type of cross border collective investment scheme, and popular fund domiciles such as Ireland may be included within the definition of offshore, notwithstanding their substantial size as a country.

Similarly, although the reference to fund can be taken to include any sort of collective investment, within offshore jurisdictions themselves, the term offshore fund is often limited to purely open-ended investment funds (i.e. a fund where the investor can redeem his investment during the life of the fund) where the investment is by way of equity (rather than by debt). This is often because closed-ended investment funds (where the investor cannot redeem out), and funds where the investment is structured by way of debt, are not normally subject to the usual regulatory requirements for investments funds, and so are not treated as funds in the stricter sense of that word.

Although the term is often used as a simply descriptive one, many onshore countries have specific definitions in their legislation or their tax codes for when an investment is treated as an offshore fund. For example, in the United Kingdom see the Offshore Funds (Tax) Regulations 2009, and in the United States see section 871 of the Internal Revenue Code of 1986.

== Structuring ==
Most offshore funds are formed as either an offshore company, partnership - typically a limited partnership - or (less commonly) unit trust in the relevant jurisdiction, and investments will characteristically be by way of equitable interest (i.e. shares, partnership interests or units).

In addition to the fund itself, most offshore funds are required by local regulations to have various functionaries most of whom are also required to be licensed under applicable legislation. These include:

- an administrator
- a manager
- a custodian
- a prime broker
- (in certain jurisdictions) an authorised representative

In certain cases exemptions will be available. For example, feeder funds in a master-feeder structure are often exempted from the requirement to appoint a custodian, and the requirement to maintain a custodian may be waived where the prime broker also fulfils the role of custodian.

Most jurisdictions also require that offshore funds submit audited accounts to the regulatory annually. Almost all jurisdictions require directors of offshore funds to satisfy regulatory criteria in relation to fit and proper persons, but some jurisdictions also require directors to be separately licensed.

== Global market/world share ==
Market share in offshore funds is normally measured either by number of funds or assets under management (AUM). However, different sources may vary in relation to market share according to (i) which jurisdictions are considered to be "offshore" and which types of collective investment schemes are included. In relation to hedge funds (the archetypal offshore fund product) Cayman has a dominant market share.

Offshore hedge funds - market share
No. of Funds		AUM	
Jurisdiction	%age	Jurisdiction	%age
Cayman Islands	45%	Cayman Islands	52%
Delaware	20%	Delaware	22%
British Virgin Islands	10%	British Virgin Islands	11%
Ireland	8%	Jersey	5%
Bermuda	6%	Bermuda	4%
Malta	5%	Ireland	3%
Luxembourg	4%	Luxembourg	3%
Jersey	2%	Guernsey	<1%
Guernsey	<1%	Isle of Man	<1%
Isle of Man	<1%	Malta	<1%

Figures for private equity funds, an investment product with similar liquidity constraints, are markedly different, with Delaware enjoying over half the market on either measure.

Offshore private equity funds - market share
No. of Funds		AUM	
Jurisdiction	%age	Jurisdiction	%age
Delaware	64%	Delaware	72%
Cayman Islands	11%	Guernsey	11%
Guernsey	7%	Cayman Islands	11%
Luxembourg	9%	Jersey	5%
Jersey	6%	Luxembourg	4%
Ireland	3%	Ireland	1%
Bermuda	<1%	Bermuda	<1%
British Virgin Islands	<1%	British Virgin Islands	<1%
Isle of Man	<1%	Isle of Man	<1%
Malta	<1%	Malta	<1%

== Regulation ==
=== Offshore ===
Most developed offshore jurisdictions provide a broadly similar regulatory regime in relation to funds formed in their country.

Typically, the regulatory regime will take a two tier approach, making a distinction between funds which are offered generally to members of the public (which will require a high degree of regulation because of the nature of potential investors), and non-public funds. Non-public funds are usually either categorised as private funds or professional funds or some equivalent label. Typically, investors in non-public funds can be assumed to be sophisticated because of the nature of the offering – there may, for example, be a high minimum initial investment, say US$100,000, and/or a requirement that investors establish that they are "professional investors" (although some offshore jurisdictions allow investors to self-certify this). Alternatively the fund may be designed for a small and select group of investors and the constitutional documents will limit the number of investors, say to no more than 50. Although most offshore jurisdictions permit funds to obtain licences to operate as public funds, the onerous regulatory requirements associated with such licences usually means that only a small minority of offshore funds are available for subscription by the general public.

Most offshore domiciling of funds tends to be regulatory driven rather than tax driven. The relative absence of regulation relating to leveraging and investment strategies in offshore jurisdictions encourages higher risk funds, such as hedge funds, to form themselves in those jurisdictions.

=== Onshore ===
Increasingly, economically developed countries are imposing direct regulation on offshore funds who wish to market to investors in those countries. The most recent example of this is the Alternative Investment Fund Managers Directive (AIFMD) which requires funds to comply with extensive rules and regulations in order to be able to market to investors within the European Union.

== Taxation ==
=== Offshore ===
Typically the offshore jurisdiction in which a fund is incorporated will not impose any direct taxation on the income of the fund. Nor will it impose any withholding or similar income taxes on distributions by the fund to its investors. However, this does not normally operate to exempt the fund from taxes which may arise as a result of its investment activities in other countries. So, for example, if a fund formed in the Cayman Islands realises a capital gain on trade in New York, it will still normally be liable for U.S. capital gains tax in the usual way. Similarly, if a person domiciled in the United Kingdom invests in a Guernsey fund, they will still be liable to taxation of income and capital gains received under British tax laws (subject to the rules on remittance of foreign earned income), notwithstanding the absence of any taxation imposed in Guernsey.

=== Onshore ===
Different onshore countries treat income arising from offshore funds in different ways. US citizens are generally subject to taxation on foreign earned investment income regardless of where they live in the world and where the income is remitted to. Under British tax rules, the taxability of foreign earned income depends upon the domicile of the tax payer and whether the funds are remitted to the United Kingdom.

There is a public perception that offshore investment funds are responsible for tax leakage in relation to cross border investment, and various laws have been passed by various countries shaped by that belief. Probably the best example of that is the American Foreign Account Tax Compliance Act (FATCA). But earlier examples also included the application of the European Union withholding tax to the British Overseas Territories (including popular offshore fund domiciles like the Cayman Islands and the British Virgin Islands). The most recent (and ongoing) example is the Convention on Mutual Administrative Assistance in Tax Matters which almost every major offshore fund domicile has agreed to be bound by.

== Criticism ==
Critics, such as ATTAC (an NGO), alleged that they are a main player of the underground economy, allowing legalized tax evasion, in particular through the usage of shell corporations practicing transfer pricing.

== See also ==
- Collective investment schemes
- Offshore Financial Centres
- Offshore 2020
