= Vistra =

Vistra may refer to either of two companies:

- Vistra (services company), a corporate services company based in Singapore
- Vistra Corp, an energy company based in Texas
