= Arun Jain =

Indian industrialist, investor and philanthropist (born 1959)

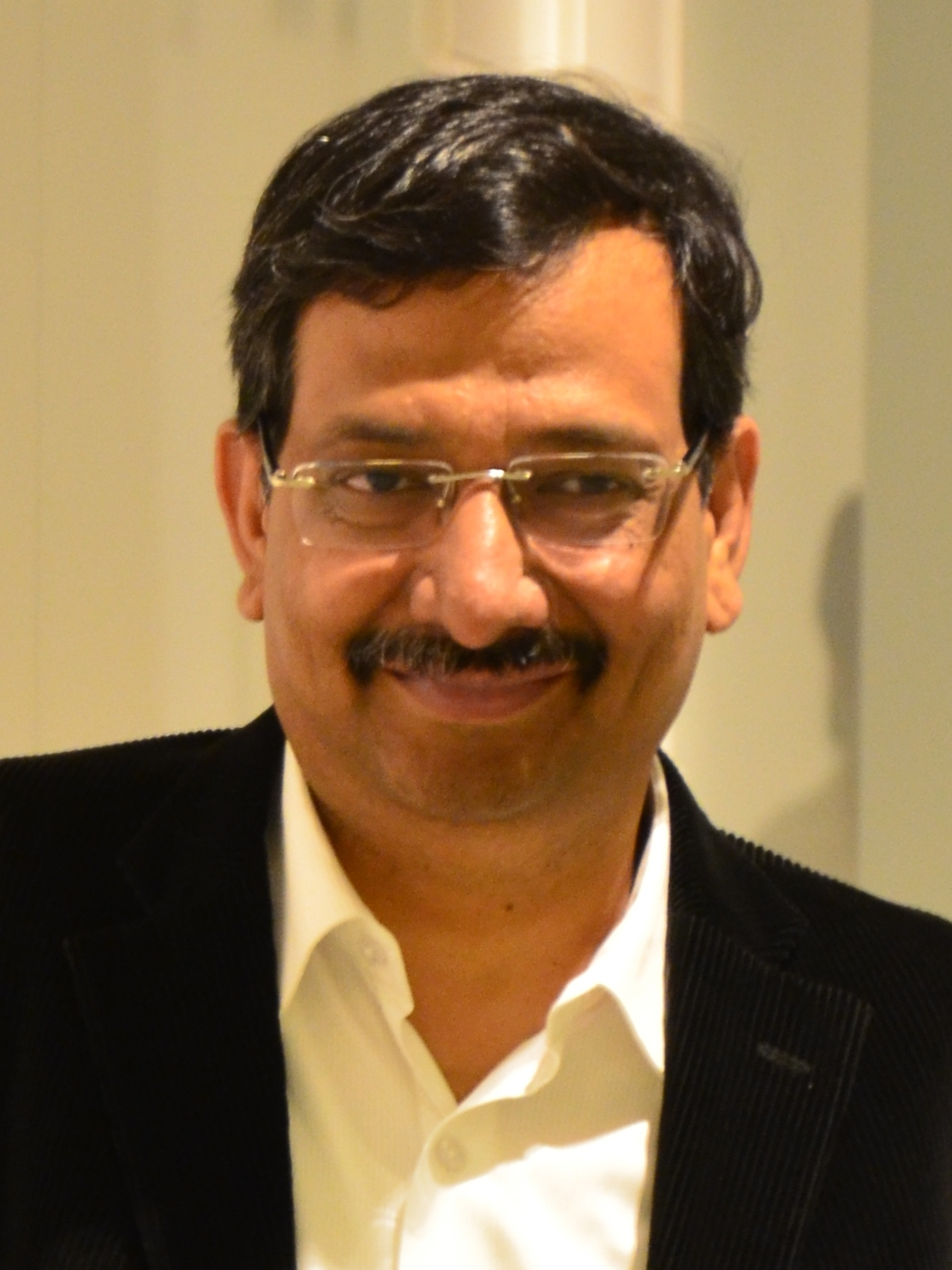
- Born: 30 December 1959 (age 66); New Delhi
- Education: Delhi Technological University
- Occupations: Chairman and Managing Director, Intellect Design Arena
- Spouse: Manju Jain
- Children: two
- Parent(s): A D K Jain, Shakuntala Jain
- Website: Arun Jain

Arun Jain (born 30 December 1959) is an Indian industrialist, investor, and philanthropist based in Chennai, India. He is the chairman and managing director of Intellect Design Arena Limited, an IT software products company in the banking, financial services, and insurance space, which is listed on the National Stock Exchange as Intellect. He was also the founder, Chairman, and CEO of Polaris Consulting and Services Ltd. (formerly known as Polaris Software Labs), an IT services company. On 4 March 2016, Virtusa Corporation acquired a majority stake in Polaris Consulting & Services Limited.

Arun has also been appointed the Chief Mentor of the Centre of Excellence for FinTech set up by the Ministry of Electronics & Information Technology (MeitY), Govt. of India, Member of the National Software Product Mission, a strategic forum for the implementation of National Policy on Software Products 2019 constituted by MeitY. He is a Governing Council Member of STPI and also a Member of the Advisory Council of TechNest, an incubation facility provided by STPI-Chennai. He has held and continues to hold, positions in CII, MMA, National Institute of Electronics and Information Technology (NIELIT), and the Indo-American Chamber of Commerce.

== Career ==
After his graduation, Arun interned with Wang Laboratories.

After his internship, Arun, along with some friends, started International Information Systems (IIS) in 1983 as a partnership firm. In 1986, IIS was renamed Nucleus Software Workshop Pvt. Ltd. At a professional level, his first major enterprise was the establishment of the Nucleus Software Workshop in 1986.

In 1993, he founded Polaris Software Lab with an initial capital of $250, which recorded a CAGR of over 100% during the seven-year period 1993–2000. Intellect Design Arena Ltd. is his fourth venture.

== Ullas Trust: Encouraging Academic Excellence ==
The Ullas Trust was started in 1997 by Arun Jain with an aim to integrate associates of Polaris, and later Intellect, with the larger community to work with young people in the country. Trust is a joint initiative of the employees and the organization.

The primary motive of Ullas is to recognise academic excellence in students from India's economically-challenged sections and encourage a ‘can do’ spirit, for them to chase their dreams and aspirations.

== References/Notes and references ==
https://captionbio.co.uk/2025/04/17/congratulations-messages-for-students-achievement/ Retrieved 14 December 2022
