= Peccenini =

Peccenini is an Italian surname. Notable people with the surname include:

- Franco Peccenini (born 1953), Italian footballer
- Luigi Peccenini (born 1939), Italian businessman, educator, and speaker
