= Linguaphone =

Linguaphone may refer to:

- Linguaphone (company), a language-training provider
- Linguaphone (musical instrument) or lamellophone, a class of musical instruments

== See also ==
- Language lab, an audio-visual installation used in language teaching
