= Small-town swot =

Chinese term linked to educational inequalities

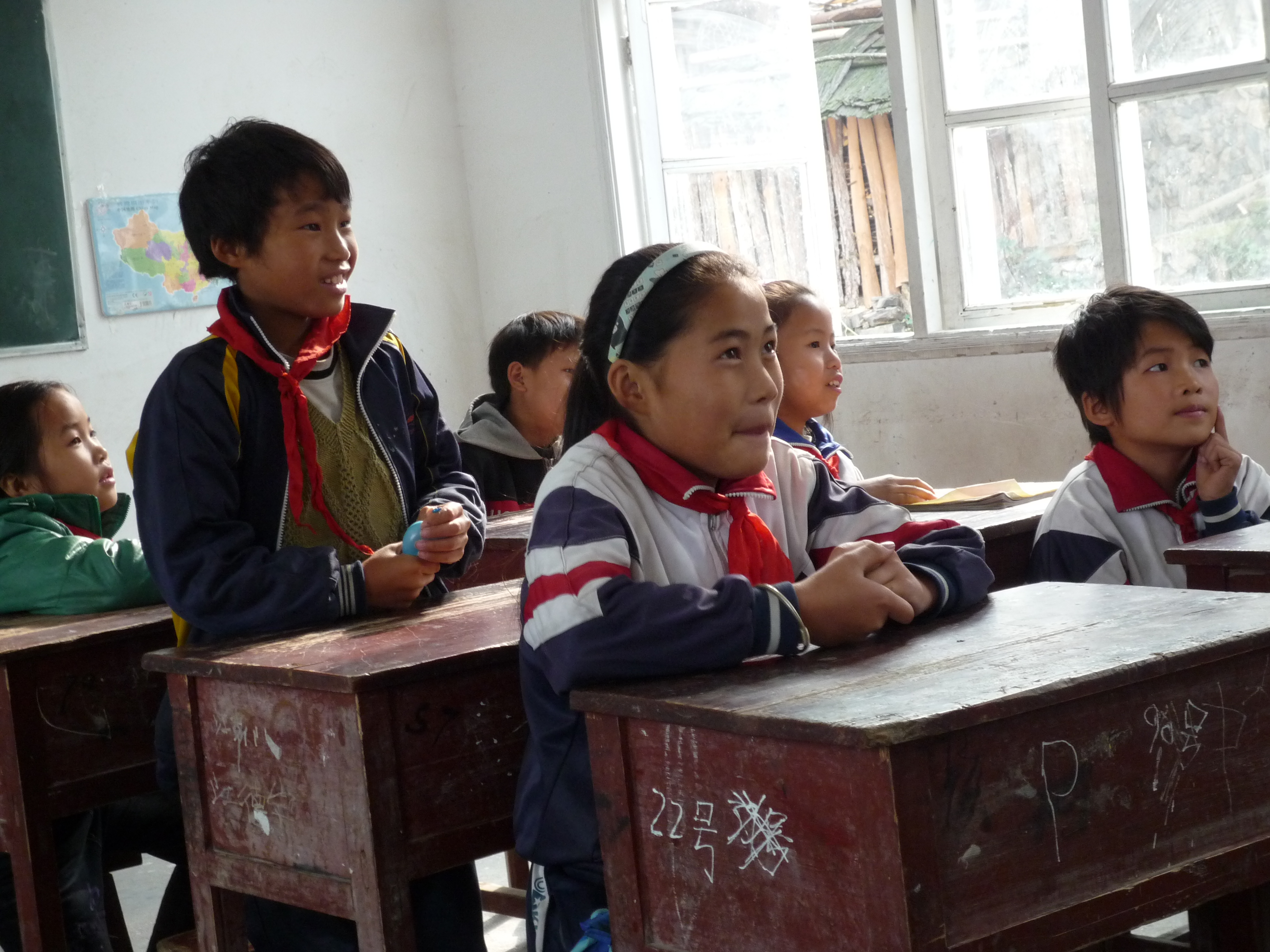
Students learning in rural school near Xijiang, China.

Small-town swot or xiaozhen zuotijia (Chinese: 小镇做题家; pinyin: xiǎo zhèn zuò tí jiā) is a Chinese satirical internet slang that describes students from rural China and county-level cities who come to work in bigger cities but are disappointed to learn that despite their diligent studies and examination success in entering elite universities, they lack the cultural and social capital of their well-connected city-born workplace peers.

The supreme test-taking abilities enable the small-town swots to score high in the Chinese college entrance exam Gaokao and enter first-class universities, namely, the schools of the 985/211 Project. With a belief that they will soon rise to the fore and achieve high on a broader stage, they soon realize that the halo they once had in small towns fades in college. Compares to their classmates who grew up in cities, they are behind in mindset, a vision of how the world really works, social resources, and social skills. They feel socially isolated, lost and confused after breaking out of the test-taking mode and leaving the "straightforward environment" of school. They often encounter obstacles or setbacks in further education or job hunting and fall into anxiety and confusion of self-doubt.

== Origin ==
In June 2020, a Chinese self-media "True Story Project (真实故事计划)" published an article titled "Small-town swot: the trap of destiny of a Project 211 Student (小镇做题家：一个211高校学生的命运陷阱)". With more than 100,000 hits, the article expanded the popularity of the term "small-town swot" from within the Douban group to the whole Chinese social media. The article tells the story of a student named Zhao Wei from a rural place in Sichuan Province. Zhao Wei studied hard and believed he captured the opportunity to leave the countryside by entering a 211 university. In his senior year, he decided to take the postgraduate entrance exam and switch major to computer science. Under tremendous pressure and his parents' unrealistic expectation, he failed the exam and became deeply depressed. He could not find a job in computer science because he did not have a related degree, nor did he want to work on the building site as his father's wish. His parents believe he studied too much and became a nerd. While his parents could not understand what he had been going through, he could not settle in the big city, nor could he return to the countryside. In December, 2020, an application was submitted to China National Intellectural Property Administration to register "small-town swot" as a trademark.

In 2021, an article titled "Education in China is becoming increasingly unfair to the poor" published in The Economist first translated the term "xiaozhen zuotijia" into English as "small-town swot".

== Context ==
The Economist pointed out that the small-town swot phenomenon reflects the education inequalities in China. It is believed that urban-rural division and social stratification are the major causes of education inequalities, which lead to the struggles of small-town swots. The Economist cited a 2015 study that the students from the poorest fifth of counties are seven times less likely than their urban peers to enter a university and 14 times less likely to attend an elite school. Based on the finding of the Stanford Rural Education Action Program, more than 70% of urban students can be admitted to a college compared to less than 5% of rural students. Moreover, according to Li et al., rural youth are 11 times less likely to enter elite Project 211 colleges than urban students.

Even if the underprivileged students are fortunate enough to enter an elite school, after graduation, their prospects are typically worse than those of wealthy and urban students. Qian Wang, a Conjoint Professor at the Xinjiang Institute of Ecology and Geography of the Chinese Academy of Sciences, commented that youth from rural areas face invisible barriers such as poor levels of foreign language and less creativity in scientific research. A lack of connection and information resources also troubles the small-town swots in job hunting. The Economist article tells the story of Wang Jianyu, a physics student who studied finance at university. When he saw his classmates gain internships at major financial companies using their parents' connections, he "truly understood the gap" between himself and his urban peers. He had to switch to computer science to get a job offer.

== Social response ==
The first article on Chinese media about small-town swots, "Small-town swot: the trap of destiny of a Project 211 student（小镇做题家：一个211高校学生的命运陷阱）", attracted more than 100,000 hits when it was first released and triggered wide conversations about the phenomenon of "small-town swot".

The Economist is the only western media that responded to the debate on small-town swots. In the article, "Education in China is becoming increasingly unfair to the poor", the author mainly attributes the small-town swot phenomenon to China's education inequality. It quoted a student who earned the best score in the Chinese college entrance exam and who is also the son of diplomats, "all the top scorers now come from wealthy families...it is becoming very difficult for students from rural areas to get into good universities".

Many national media of China expressed affirmative attitudes towards "small-town swots". In 2022, China Daily, a newspaper owned by the Publicity Department of the Chinese Communist Party, published an article titled "'Small-town swot' is no mocking matter". The article states, "many small-town swots have participated and contributed to China's development over the past four decades" and "such vitality in social mobility should be encouraged rather than mocked." The Guangming Daily, a national Chinese daily newspaper published an article titled "Hold confidence in your hands, small-town swots!" The article stated, "the stage of graduation and entering the workplace is one of the most intense stages when young people's ideals and reality collide". It encourages small-town swots to repack their bags, keeps their feet on the ground, and set off again.

== Controversy ==
China Youth Daily commented that the small-town swots may feel jealous and angry to see they are not as successful as a good-looking influencer with a low degree of education, which is not a practical attitude.

== See also ==
- Gaokao
- Project 211
- Project 985
- Education inequality in China
- Tangping
- Douban
