= Jean Salata =

Hong Kong Businessman of Chilean descent

- Born: Jean Eric Salata; 22 December 1965 (age 60); Chile
- Education: Wharton School of the University of Pennsylvania
- Title: Chairman of EQT AB; Founder of Baring Private Equity Asia
- Spouse: Melanie Pong
- Children: 4

Jean Eric Salata (Chinese: 莊佳誠; born 22 December 1965) is a Chilean businessman who currently serves as Chairman of EQT AB. He is the founder of Baring Private Equity Asia (BPEA), one of the largest private equity firms in Asia that was later acquired by EQT AB.

In February 2023, Forbes put his net worth at US$5.9 billion making him the second richest person in Chile and the 15th richest person in Hong Kong. He is also the 85th wealthiest person in Latin America.

== Early life ==
Salata was born in Chile on 22 December 1965, to Orlando Salata and Hilda Rothleder. His family's roots trace back to Austria, Poland, and Germany, as his parents were emigrants who sought refuge from Nazism in the 1930s.

Salata and his family moved to Erie, Pennsylvania when he was five. He began investing in the stock market when he was 12 to 13. Salata graduated from Cathedral Preparatory School in 1984. In 1988, Salata graduated magna cum laude with a Bachelor of Science in Finance and Economics from the Wharton School of the University of Pennsylvania.

== Career ==
After graduation, Salata worked for Bain & Company initially in Boston and in 1989 moved to Hong Kong where he advised foreign companies on Mainland China entry strategies.

In 1991, Salata turned down an offer to attend Harvard Business School and instead took a job at the investment arm of AIG.

In 1997, Salata and two senior colleagues from AIG were tapped to lead BPEA, the Asian Unit of Baring Private Equity Partners which was an affiliate of Barings Bank. It would receive $300 million in seed funding from ING Group. However, the two colleagues pulled out and ING downsized its commitment to $25 million due to the collapse of Barings Bank and the Asian financial crisis. However, despite the difficult circumstances, Salata recruited a team and deployed capital into NetEase and Mphasis. These successful investments allowed BPEA to raise $300 million for its debut fund in 1999.

In 2000, Salata and his team completed a management buyout of the firm making it independent.

As the firm grew, Salata took a step back from investment duties and spent more time on management.

In October 2022, Salata sold BPEA to EQT which formed BPEA EQT. His net worth doubled to $5.9 billion making him one of the richest people in Hong Kong.

In October 2025, EQT announced it was nominating Salata to succeed founder Conni Jonsson as chairperson.

== Personal life ==
Salata is married to Melanie Pong who he met while studying at the University of Pennsylvania. She studied French literature and has a master's degree in Art History. She is a Hong Kong native and was one of the reasons why Salata moved to Hong Kong. They have four children, Max, Alexandra Anna, Sebastian, and Keira.

Salata's father, Orlando was an architect who graduated from the University of Chile. He had worked on the Barber National Institute and the Mary D'Angelo Performing Arts Center. He died on 20 May 2009.

Salata has a brother named Maurice who is also an architect like their father.

In February 2021, Salata donated $5 million to Cathedral Preparatory School to help construct the Salata Technology and Innovation Center.

In June 2022, Salata and Melanie donated $200 million to establish the Salata Institute for Climate and Sustainability at Harvard University.

== See also ==
- List of Chileans by net worth
