= Homework coach =

Category of tutor

A homework coach is a category of tutor whose mission is to help a student's overall academic success. A parent might hire a homework coach when their child is struggling in school because of issues with study skills, organization, executive function skills and motivation. The goal of the coach is to teach the child to develop themself as a successful student by providing them with the support to work on assignments, organize study materials and manage time effectively. In the case of an ADHD student, the coach might find ways to manage the symptoms of their attention deficit disorder. As such, the role of a homework coach is similar to ADHD coaching but is focused specifically on success in school. Some providers use the term "homework helper" as well as "homework coach."

== Applicability ==
A homework coach is indicated for any student whose poor performance in school or college appears to be more related to organization and study skills rather than difficulty in understanding the instructional material. Such students may show signs of ADHD or Executive Function disorder. Current statistics published by the Centers for Disease Control show that as many as 11% of schoolchildren 4–17 years of age have received an ADHD diagnosis. Among ADHD students, about 33% will not graduate high school with their peers, which is about twice the rate of the non-ADHD student population. By hiring a homework coach, parents hope that the added support in building study skills, helping plan assigned assignments, test-taking strategies and general homework monitoring will keep their children on track in school and increase their chances of graduating on time.

== Effectiveness ==
Parents generally measure the efficiency of homework coaching in terms of higher grades and less discord in the household over their student's homework habits. There are also many anecdotal news stories and case studies about how a homework coach has helped students improve their grades and self-confidence. The intensity and tempo of homeworkers affect stress resistance and quite an emotional state of the pupil. The correct approach to implementing tasks will allow for performing all tasks with maximum efficiency.

== Pros and cons ==
=== Pros ===
- Individual attention: Students receive personalized attention and support tailored to their specific needs.
- Improvement of study habits: Tutors can help students develop effective learning strategies and methods.
- Accountability: A tutor can help students keep track of their assignments and stay on schedule.
- Motivation: Tutors can encourage and motivate, helping students maintain focus on their academic goals.

=== Cons ===
- Cost: The cost of tutoring services for homework help can deter some students who lack the financial means for regular tutoring sessions.
- Time commitment: Regular tutoring sessions require a time and effort commitment, which may not be feasible for students with busy schedules.
- Compatibility: Not all tutors may be suitable for every student. It might take some trial and error to find a tutor that matches a student's learning style and preferences.
- Dependency: Over-reliance on a tutor may hinder a student’s ability to develop independent problem-solving skills.
- Availability: Finding a tutor who is available at the needed time, especially during peak hours, can be challenging.

== See also ==
- Coaching
- Mentorship
