= National Tutoring Association =

American non-profit organization

The National Tutoring Association is an American non-profit organization that certifies and trains tutors. To date, the NTA has certified over 14,000 tutors.
