= Education inequality in China =

Education inequality in China exists on multiple levels, with significant disparities occurring along gender, geographical, and ethnic divides. More specifically, disparities exist in the distribution of educational resources nationwide, as well as the availability of education on levels, ranging from basic to higher education.

== History after 1945 ==
Shortly after the Chinese Communist Revolution in 1949, the Chinese Communist Party government was confronted with heavy educational disparities across the nation. In the years following the Chinese Communist Revolution, the Chinese government attempted to address these disparities with alternating approaches, creating periods of differing emphasis on opposing educational models. The first model, based on egalitarianism, emphasizes equality across regions of varying economic wealth and development. Conversely, the second model, based on competition, emphasizes individualistic competition, rationalizing any existing educational disparities as a necessary sacrifice for national economic development.

The Chinese government also focused educational policies on higher education and specialized training, leaving basic education underdeveloped throughout large parts of the country. Government funding for education was reserved for urban areas; rural communities, already at an economic disadvantage, were left to fund their own schools, exacerbating the already existing divide between urban and rural education. When collectivization policies passed in 1955, placing rural families into agricultural cooperatives that distributed income on the basis of labor hours, the importance of education dropped even further within these rural communities, and they were much less likely to fund primary education for the children of their communities.

Also beginning in the 1950s, the hukou system assigned the Chinese population into urban and rural regions, exacerbating continuously worsening inequalities within health, employment, housing, and education. Further complicating education policy, people of rural-hukou status are able to live and work in urban areas without changing their hukou designation. According to Xiaogang Wu's tabulation, based on figures from the 2000 Chinese Census, an estimated 33% of city residents were actually designated as rural-hukou holders.

A significant shift in education finance policy occurred in 1982 with the introduction of decentralization, in which provincial governments were now individually in control of financing education within their region. The change in policy sought to capitalize on rapid income growth by funding education from non-governmental sources, and in the 1980s and 1990s, the government share of education expenditures dropped, even as total education expenditures increased. As a result, families had to pay increased tuition and fees, and schools turned to surcharges and social contributions to fund themselves. Education for children of poorer families was only attainable with state subsidies, which often did not reach the families who were most in need. Tuition and fees also increase as students move from lower to higher grade levels, so even if these poorer students were able to move through the education system, many were prevented from even completing their compulsory education by economic barriers. Additionally, this shift to a wider financial base for education also coincided with rising interprovincial inequality, significantly impairing education opportunities for children in poorly developed rural provinces.

Although basic education policies remain in control of the Communist Party, increased open-mindedness shown by party authorities indicates the possibility of more substantial educational reform, in addition to recent reforms to the national college entrance examination. Although educational inequality has lessened overall, great gaps in educational attainment still exist between populations on multiple divides, affirming the need for a regional focus within reform initiatives.

=== Gender stratification ===
Although recent studies have shown reductions in gender inequality within Chinese education since the 1980s, disparities still remain across different regions of China. Studies have indicated that education in rural areas of China shows significantly greater gender disparity than education in urban areas. Since 1981, the rural illiteracy rate of females has consistently been over twice that of males, despite an overall decrease in illiteracy in rural regions.

However, with rapid economic growth, the increase of parental income enables more children to obtain at least a basic education, and this greatly increases chances of girls going to school as well. Previously, it was common for parents to prioritize the education of sons over that of their daughters; with greater opportunities, the demand for female education can be easier satisfied, fueling an increase in the actual demand for female education as well.

=== One-child policy Effect ===
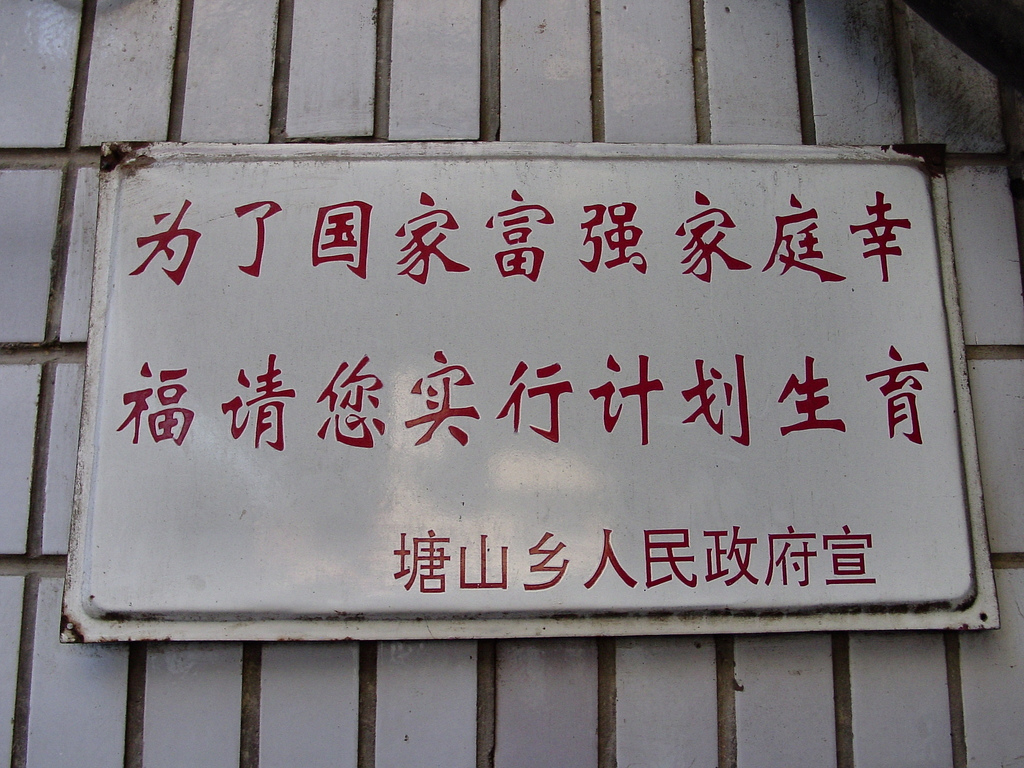
Government sign in Tangshan Village, De'an County, Jiujiang, Jiangxi, stating: "For the sake of the country's prosperity and families' happiness, please implement family planning"

The One-child Policy in China plays an important role in the inequality of education. The One-child policy was implemented in China in 1979 to slow down the country's explosive population growth and was abolished in 2016. Before the one-child policy, parents were allowed to have more than one child and had the opportunity to display a preference toward male children; this so-called “son preference” has prevailed among most Chinese parents for centuries. However, after the One-child policy was enacted, the only-child girls were able to receive more educational opportunities because there was not as much competition for household resources as in multiple-child households. The gender inequality has improved by this One-child policy and therefore, female education opportunity has increased. The big issue on gender inequality has been improved through this policy.

=== Geographical stratification ===
There are a number of factors that contribute to the existing disparities between urban and rural education, with the latter lagging far behind the former as a result of economic, social, and political disparities. In China, the household registration system separates citizens into urban residence and rural residence. The underfunding of rural schools, inadequate government efforts to provide financial aid for rural students, and the current household registration system all contribute to the urban-rural educational divide.

Interprovincial inequality in school funding has increased, along with increased dependence in non-budgeted funding sources. Research indicates that the disparity between provincial primary educational expenditures per student nearly doubled between 1990 and 2000. Additionally, while overall illiteracy rates have dropped since 1980, the disparity between urban and rural illiteracy rates continued to increase, with the rural illiteracy rate double that of urban areas in 2000.

Another recent problem causing regional education disparity is the migration of a large portion of China's rural population into urban areas. In many rural regions, particularly within smaller rural towns, this decrease in population also creates problems for schools. As a result, to confront drastic increases in enrollment, many schools consolidate students of multiple grade levels into multigrade classes, a practice that not only challenges teachers, but also negatively affects the quality of education that students receive.

As a result of the vast numbers of rural workers migrating to the cities to find employment opportunities, many children are left behind, keeping these children in rural schools that still lag far behind their urban counterparts. For rural children who do follow their parents to urban areas, the hukou system bars them from attending urban public schools. These children often must attend private schools that charge higher tuition, even while offering subpar education.

=== Educational inequality within urban areas ===
Rural to urban migration is a unique feature of China’s economic development. Within the twenty years at the turn of the 21st century, 164 million rural workers moved to urban areas, accounting for migrant labor. Because of the social welfare system (hukou), children of migrant workers usually are not accessible to the regular education system in the city. They thus faced the choice of leaving their parents and returning to their rural hometown or paying a sponsorship fee in addition to tuition to stay in the city for education. These extra fees are around 300 to 400 RMB for primary school enrollment and is around 500RMB for secondary schools. With most migrant workers being low income households, such fees prevent them from sending their children to urban schools.

For children who stay in urban areas for education, some of them were only able to attend schools with poor conditions or low quality. According to the Beijing Governmental Statistics, among children of migrant workers who stayed in Beijing, 26% of them, around 95 thousand, attend private schools that are unlicensed. Unlicensed schools do not meet the required standard for schools; usually with no comfortable schoolhouse, qualified teachers and legal licences for school operation.

Some children of migrant workers cannot enroll in school. Survey results from 9 major cities in China show that there are more than 260 thousand migrant children who are not able to afford schools in the city they live in. The same survey also shows that some migrant children enroll in school years later than the regular enrollment age, and their dropout rate increases as they grow older.

=== Ethnic stratification ===
The population of China mainly consists of the Han ethnic majority, with 55 ethnic minorities accounting for around 8.89% of the total population according to its national census in 2020. However, this small minority population accounts for almost half of China's absolute poor, highlighting the severe income inequality that exists between China's majority Han population and numerous minority groups.

While overall enrollment rates have risen for both the Han Chinese population and the Chinese minority population, minority enrollment rates remain lower than that of the Han majority population. Aside from enrollment rates, ethnic disparities in education have also manifested in the form of cultural marginalization, especially with the emergence of a state-sponsored curriculum that enforces assimilation. To preserve individual cultures and languages, many ethnic groups have created multilingual school systems.

=== Family Income Stratification ===
The impact of education from family income mainly displays on two things, one involves the physical environment for children, and the other one is the nonphysical influence to children's growth. First of all, “under which poor households have fewer material resources and children who grow up in under‐resourced families tend to lag behind in education and other fields". Household expenditure on children's education in China is different from other countries such as United States or United Kingdom. Chinese parents attach significant importance to their children's private education investment, which includes private tutors, extracurricular classes, interest classes, and so on. Parents with higher income can provide children more training and opportunities of going to more educational institutions. However, families with less financial support are often incapable of providing these extra educational investments. Moreover, poverty affects the ability of parents to monitor their children's various need during growth and there is evidence indicating economic hardship can reduce the communication between parents and children. According to a 2011 survey, children growing under a lower income family can face more challenges from economic hardship and this makes them more likely to drop school or have emotional problems, such as a tendency for violent and crime. In China, parental income is one of the reasons that cause education inequality, and this cannot be neglected, based on its major influence on children's growth.

=== Education for students with disabilities ===
According to a 2017 national survey, only 45% of school age children with disabilities in China have access to inclusive education, standard schools where disabled children are accepted to enroll in. Traditional schools evaluate student performance solely based on their test scores, putting children with disabilities at a disadvantage in the school selection process. The high cost of assistive technology is one barrier that presents disables children from inclusive education. A study conducted an interview with a student with hearing impairment. They indicated that with no assistive technology, it is difficult for them to participate in college life since they cannot distinguish others’ voices. Assistive technology products are expensive, and that spending relies on the students and their families instead of the educational institution.

The level of integration also differs by region. In more developed cities, inclusive education for students with disabilities shows a growing trend. In Hefei City, one school district practises a "zero-refusal" acceptance stance towards the disabled students. Shanghai standardizes the process to enroll students with disabilities in schools and requires schools with 10 or more students with disabilities to have a special resources classroom with a dedicated full-time teacher. Such resources and regulation are less common in rural areas.

== Effects of education inequality ==
Education heavily influences social and economic mobility, with research indicating that higher levels of parental education positively influence their children's levels of education. This connection is especially significant within rural communities, with education playing a large role in breaking the vicious cycle of poverty.

However, Guangjie Ning's contrasting analysis of existing research suggests that income inequality and education equality are mutually reinforcing factors, perpetuating a vicious cycle of their own. Therefore, by Ning's logic, in accordance with the popular perception of education as a means of escape from poverty, children from poorer families theoretically need education the most, yet encounter greater economic barriers that prevent continuation of education.

== Current education policy ==
Currently, variations in education policy across different levels of schooling continue to contribute to educational inequality. Even within the same region, school attendance and tuition are regulated differently, often causing confusion for families new to the education system.

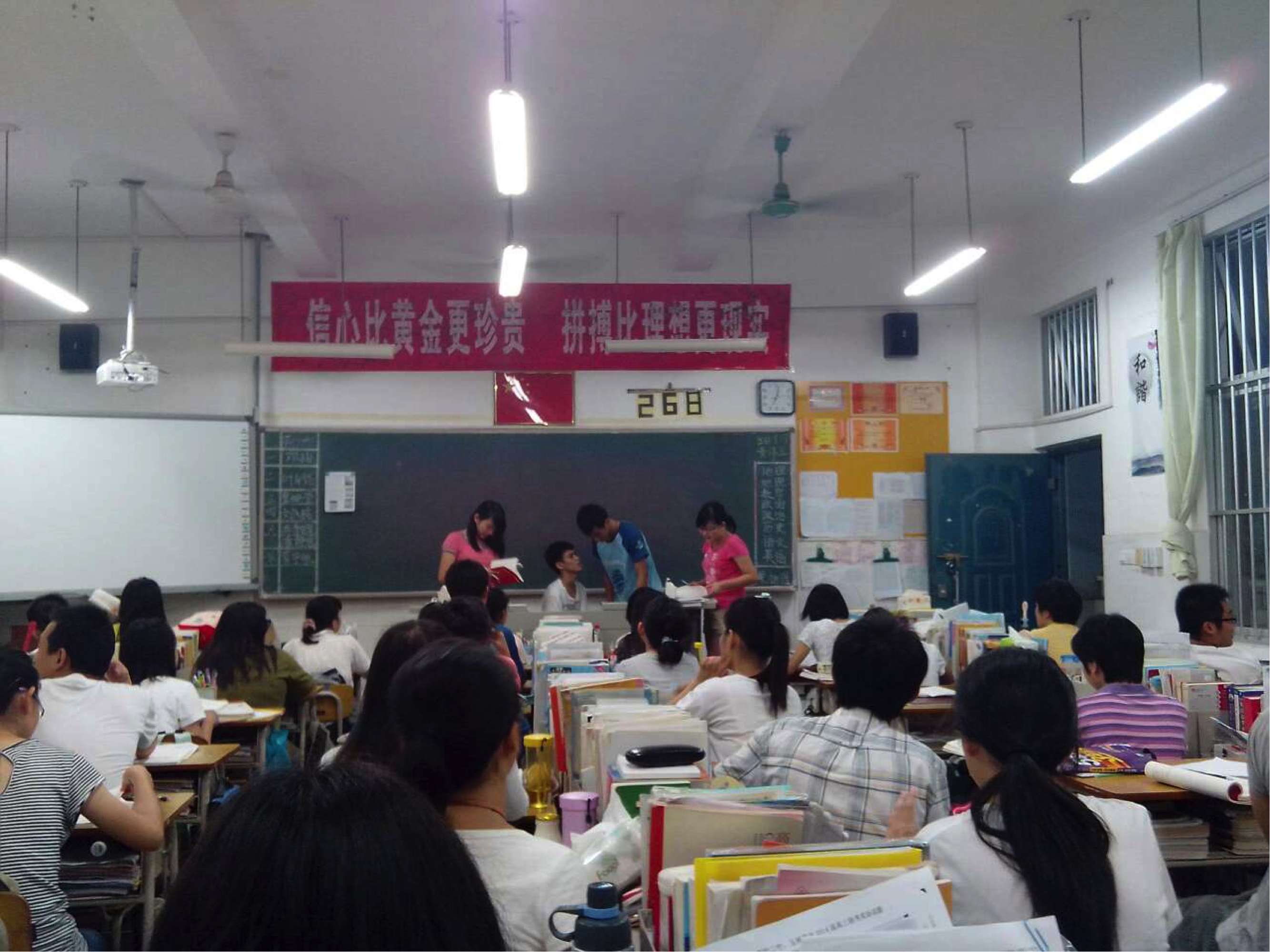
A typical high school classroom in China.

Beginning in the early 1980s, grades 1-6 have been designated as compulsory education; it was not until the mid-1990s that grades 7-9 were also designated as compulsory. This regulation of earlier education was enhanced by the elimination of tuition for grades 1–9 in the early 2000s, and in recent years, the poor are now able to obtain subsidies for the education of their children. This system of 9 year compulsory education has been partially successful in rural areas, with regions reporting very high primary-level enrollment and completion rates. However, grades 10-12 have not been designated as compulsory, and high secondary-level dropout rates break the 9 year compulsory education cycle even earlier. Additionally, in rural areas, the tuition for public high school is comparatively higher than that of most other developing countries, further discouraging rural households from focusing their income on upper secondary education.

Additionally, as a result of China's large population, college enrollment slots are still restricted in availability, with tuition so high that the costs far dwarf the income of a typical family in poverty. Recent efforts to expand college education availability, coupled with increasing emphasis on scholarships and loans, may help counter rising tuition costs (and other income-related barriers to higher education). Despite tuition challenges, more and more students have been able to graduate from college, with the number of college graduates quadrupling in the past decade.

As an attempt to level the playing field, the gaokao, or Chinese university examination, offered extra points for students of ethnic minority backgrounds, although this was scaled back in the 2014 reforms to the national examination policy after multiple cases of ethnicity alteration prompted national backlash. The new reforms also included provisions for provincial quotas, requiring universities to reserve a designated number of admission seats for students from outside of the university's region.

The implementation of the double reduction policy in 2021 was a new attempt by Chinese regulators to reduce the inequality of educational resources allocation caused by regional inequality and economic differences during the compulsory education period. According to Opinions on Further Reducing the Homework Burden and Off-Campus Training Burden of Students in Compulsory Education, schools should narrow the educational quality gap and reduce the need for students to rely on tutoring institutions by optimizing teaching methods, designing teaching materials based on students' different abilities, and providing students with abundant educational resources. As schools provided "on-campus classes for both academic subjects and extra-curricular activities" and tutoring institutions were no longer permitted to be for-profit institutions, the double reduction policy had relieved the inequality phenomenon whereby poor families did not have access to adequate educational resources while rich families can obtain better academic performance through tutoring institutions. And the Ministry of Education of the People's Republic of China also pointed out that the higher level of educational equity could be realized through the student-oriented education method, which satisfies students’ individual growth needs.

== See also ==
- Education inequality
- Education in China
- History of Education in China
- Women in China
- Gender inequality in China
- Small-town Swot
- Double Reduction Policy
