= Linguaphone (company) =

Language-training provider

Linguaphone is a global language training provider based in London that has provided self-study, online and face to face language courses since 1901.

== Methodology ==
Linguaphone’s self-study courses follow Linguaphone's in-house methodology of “Listen, Understand, Speak.” Students are encouraged to listen to the language from the beginning, to begin to read as they listen, and only to speak once they have learned to understand the language presented.

== History ==
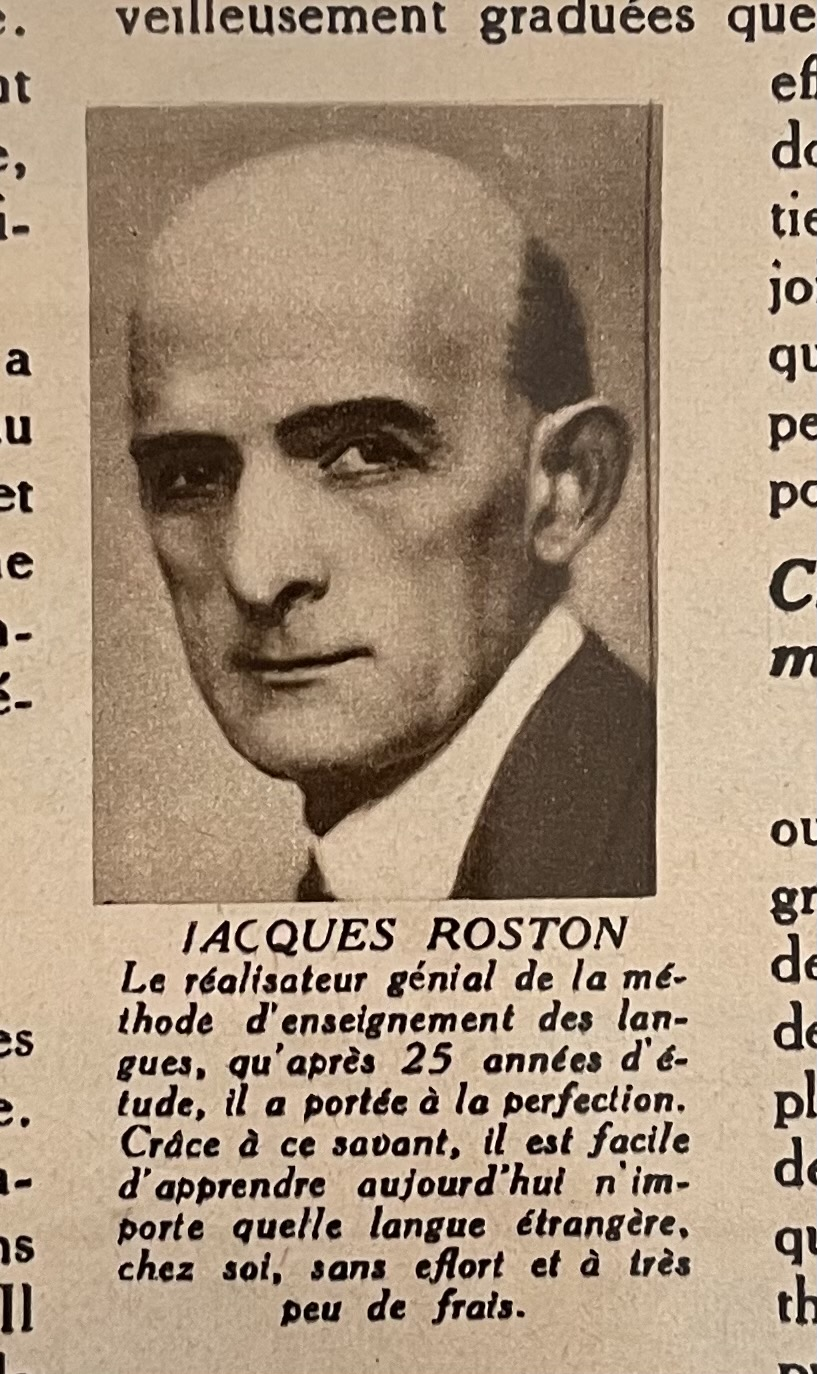
Jacques Roston, founder of Linguaphone

Linguaphone was established in 1901 by Jacques Roston, a translator and language teacher, born in Koło, Poland, and they were the first language training company to recognise the potential of combining the traditional written course with the wax cylinder and later with records.

At the height of its popularity, Linguaphone was an international publishing house with representative offices for books, records, tapes and cassettes. It also operated language schools in cities including London, Paris, New York and Tokyo. This chain of Linguaphone Institutes could claim to be the second oldest among the international language teaching establishments (the oldest being Berlitz, founded in 1878 and known today as Berlitz International) and, as such, Linguaphone had, at one time, the privilege of being an almost automatic first choice among the famous of the day, including royalty.

The schools that mainly catered for the business world and the diplomatic service, adapted the Linguaphone method to be used flexibly in combination with face-to-face tuition and the then new language laboratory. The tape recorders in these school language laboratories were specially designed (and patented) by Linguaphone to work on two separate tracks: a master track with the teachers' voices that could only be listened to but not erased, and another track for the students, where (in the gaps provided for the purpose) the students could record and erase their own voices as often as they liked or thought necessary. Teachers were also present to monitor the students’ progress during these laboratory sessions and, when needed, they could give individual guidance through their headphones that were linked to a central monitoring tower in the middle of the laboratory.

A further adaptation of this school method was then developed with the invention of the portable language laboratory, the so-called minilab, that could be rented for set periods (with cassettes instead of reel-to-reel tapes). The minilabs became widely used for in-company language tuition as well as for regular language training at government departments and professional organisations, such as the Ministry of Defence, the Foreign and Commonwealth Office and the Institute of Directors.

Linguaphone schools, which used to be fashionable, were forced to stop operations due to economic pressures and competition. Its last branch, at 26–32 Oxford Street, London W.1. UK, closed in September 1980. The branch had its own Executives’ Club licensed to sell alcoholic drinks to members and their guests, even at hours when ordinary British catering establishments were strictly forbidden to do so.

=== Linguaphone Hong Kong ===
Linguaphone opened its Hong Kong branch in 1961. It gained much popularity during the 1970s and 1980s as the recording system offered by Linguaphone gave the flexibility to the locals who could not attend language courses at a fixed time and location. Students were also able to listen to the material repeatedly at any preferred time during the course; something that conventional education methods could not offer at the time.

In the early 2000s, the Hong Kong branch of Linguaphone went on a steady decline due to the development of the Internet and popularization of computers, which facilitate an online and interactive learning experience, and other rivals such as Wall Street Institute Hong Kong. Linguaphone Hong Kong announced its liquidation on 17 January 2009.

== Linguaphone Group English language training centers ==
The Linguaphone Group has a global network of English language training centers for adults ("Direct English") and children ("Pingu's English") worldwide across Europe, the Middle East, Asia and Africa. The Group has centers in Japan, France, Spain, Italy, Cyprus, Algeria, Egypt, Syria, Saudi Arabia, Malaysia, Singapore, Indonesia, Taiwan, Thailand, Turkey, Portugal, India and Vietnam.

== See also ==
- Language education
