= List of Chileans by net worth =

This is a list of Chilean billionaires based on an annual assessment of wealth and assets compiled and published by Forbes magazine in 2026.

== 2026 Chilean billionaires list ==
World Rank	Name	Citizenship	Net worth (USD)	Source of wealth
35	Iris Fontbona	Chile	52.6 billion	Antofagasta plc
422	Jean Salata	Chile; Hong Kong	8.4 billion	EQT AB
1108	Julio Ponce Lerou	Chile	3.9 billion	Sociedad Química y Minera
1676	Luis Enrique Yarur Rey	Chile	2.5 billion	Banco de Crédito e Inversiones
2052	Roberto Angelini Rossi	Chile; Italy	2 billion	Grupo Angelini
2481	Patricia Angelini Rossi	Chile; Italy	1.6 billion	Grupo Angelini

== See also ==
- The World's Billionaires
- List of countries by the number of billionaires
