= Tutoring =

Private academic lessons

Tutoring is private academic help, usually provided by an expert teacher; someone with deep knowledge or defined expertise in a particular subject or set of subjects.

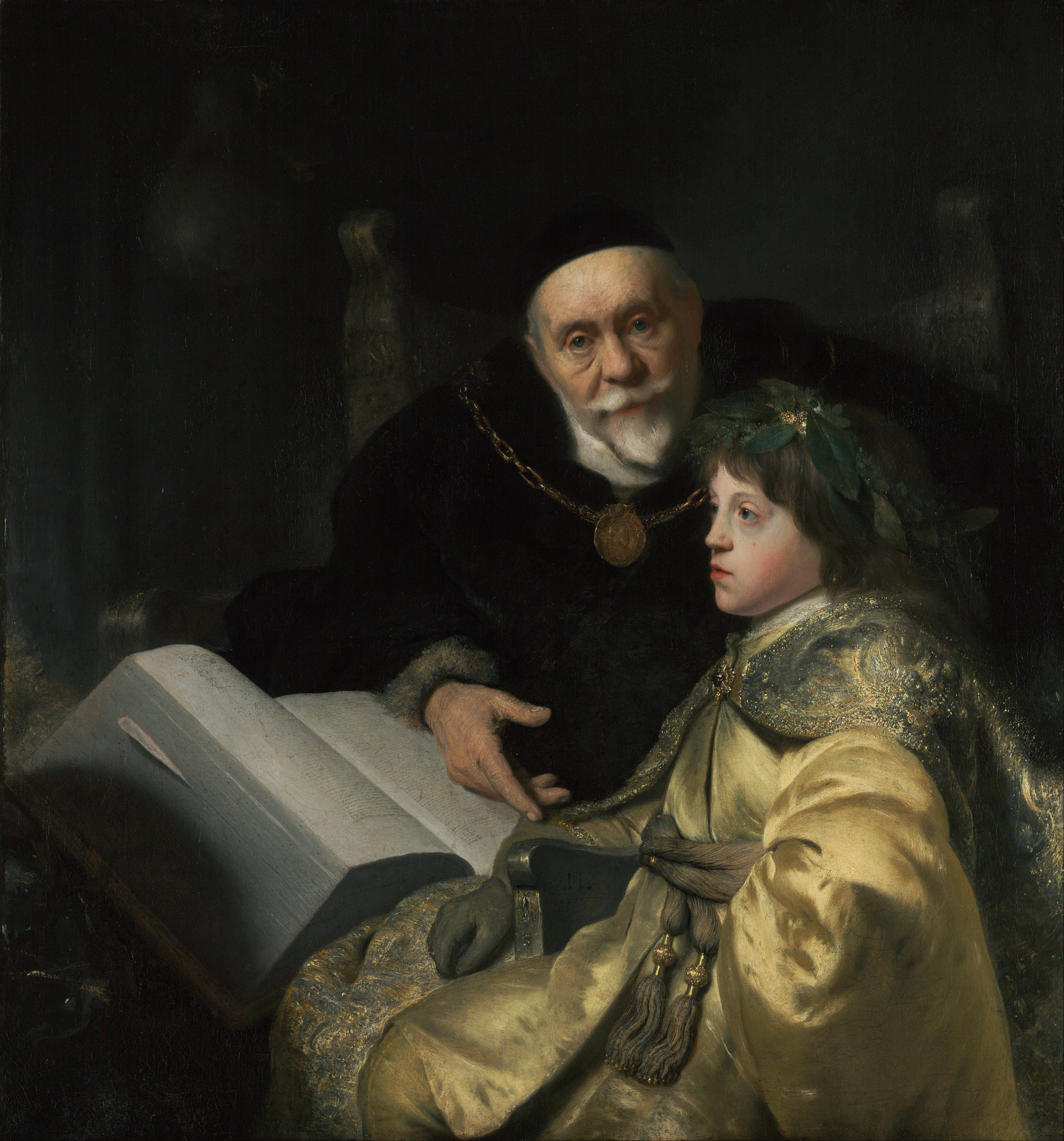
Prince Charles Louis of the Palatinate with his tutor Wolrad von Plessen, in traditional dress

A tutor, formally also called an academic tutor, is a person who provides assistance or tutelage to one or more people on certain subject areas or skills. The tutor spends a few hours on a daily, weekly, or monthly basis to transfer their expertise on the topic or skill to the student (also called a tutee). Tutoring can take place in different settings. A private tutor is often a person who provides additional educational support outside a person's school or other educational setting. In the British higher education system, a tutor is a general term for someone delivering tutorials, individually or in small groups: see tutorial system.

== History ==
Formal education is first attested among the scribes of ancient Egypt but, in most fields, instruction was traditionally handled on a personal basis, with most skills and professions long handed down within families or via apprenticeship until the modern era. In classical antiquity, the lower classes could pay for instruction in group settings like ludi but the upper classes preferred personalized home tutoring. In ancient China, some aristocratic tutors like Confucius and Mencius attracted so many students that they established influential philosophies. In ancient Greece, some sophists established lucrative careers teaching the important skills of public speaking for the assembly or courts; in Plato's works, Socrates provides similar services for free while criticizing the sophists for their presumed lack of concern for actual truth and understanding. In the case of the ancient Romans, the education of the patricians and wealthy plebeians was frequently provided by Greek slaves.

Royal tutors, the personal instructors of future rulers, have always enjoyed importance and prestige. In particular, the Grand Tutor (太傅, tàifù) was one of the three great lords of the royal court of the Zhou dynasty of ancient China. Similar positions remained in very high importance across East Asia into the modern era.

By some accounting, methods of tutoring only began to become more structured after the 20th century through focus and specialization in the training of tutors, application of tutoring, and evaluation of tutors. From the 20th century onwards, with the rapid spread of mainstream education, the demand for tutoring has also increased as a way to supplement formal education.

== British and Irish secondary schools ==
In British and Irish secondary schools, form tutors are given the responsibilities of a form or class of students in a particular year group (up to 30 students). They usually work in year teams headed by a year leader, year head, or guidance teacher. Form tutors will provide parents with most of the information about their child's progress and any problems they might be experiencing.

In the United Kingdom and Ireland, private tutoring outside school is common for students who need extra support in one or more subjects, particularly leading up to exams. In Ireland this practice is known as grinds.

== Private tutoring in Asia ==
Home tutoring in India is widely desirable as maximum parents believe that students academically perform better if they are mentored by a home tutor.

A 2012 study by the Asian Development Bank and the Comparative Education Research Centre at the University of Hong Kong pointed out that private tutoring can dominate the lives of young people and their families, maintain and exacerbate social inequalities, divert needed household income into an unregulated industry, and create inefficiencies in education systems. It can also undermine official statements about fee-free education and create threats to social cohesion.

In South Korea, nearly 90% of elementary students receive some form of shadow education, usually in cram schools termed Hagwon. In Hong Kong, about 85% of senior secondary students do so. 60% of primary students in West Bengal, India, and 60% of secondary students in Kazakhstan receive private tutoring.

Demand for tutoring in Asia is exploding; by comparison globally, shadow education is most extensive in Asia. This is partly due to the stratification of education systems, cultural factors, perceptions of shortcomings in regular school systems, and the combination of growing wealth and smaller family sizes. Therefore, the education sector has become a profitable industry which businesses have created different kinds of products and advertisement such as "the king/queen of tutorial", a usual advertisement tactic of Hong Kong tutorial centers that has spread to South Korea, Thailand, Sri Lanka, and India where tutors achieve "celebrity-like status". In some cases, successful Southeast Asian tutors will even embrace the title of "tutor". Online private tutor matching platforms and learning platform offering online learning materials are other product offerings.

In Cambodia, most tutoring is provided by teachers, whereas in Hong Kong, it is provided by individuals, small companies or large companies. In Mongolia, most tutoring is labor-intensive, while entrepreneurs in South Korea make use of computers and other forms of technology.

=== Policy ===
A 2012 study by the Asian Development Bank and the Comparative Education Research Centre at the University of Hong Kong recommended policymakers across the region take a closer look at how 'shadow education' affects family budgets, children's time, and national education systems. It suggested that in order to reduce the need for private lessons, improvements in mainstream schools should be made. Regulations are also needed to protect citizens.

On 24 July 2021, the Double Reduction Policy got promulgated jointly by the General Office of the Chinese Communist Party and the State Council of the People's Republic of China. The policy reclassified tutoring institutions in China as non-profit organizations, which solved the over-reliance of Chinese students on after-school tutoring classes, and reduced the additional financial burden on Chinese families. Chinese families spend 40 to 50 percent of their total domestic spending on tutoring. The double reduction policy's regulation of shadow education has improved the quality of school curriculum during the Compulsory education period and relieved the inequality of educational resources caused by the economic gap.

== Costs of tutoring ==
Some studies have estimated costs associated with "shadow education". In Pakistan, expenditures on tutoring per child averaged $3.40 a month in 2011. In Japan, families spent $12 billion in 2010 on private tutoring.

In Georgia, household expenditures for private tutoring at the secondary school level was $48 million in 2011. In Hong Kong, the business of providing private tutoring to secondary schools reached $255 million in 2011. The estimated size of the private tuition industry in India was estimated to be worth around $70 billion in 2017.

In South Korea, where the government has attempted to cool down the private tutoring market, shadow education costs have nonetheless continually grown, reaching $17.3 billion in 2010. Household expenditures on private tutoring are equivalent to about 80% of government expenditures on public education for primary and secondary students.

In the United States, the tutoring market is fragmented. Some online tutoring marketplaces, however, have managed to aggregate a large number of private tutors on their platform and also tutoring data. For example, one such site has over 34,000 registered tutors in California and made public their tutoring hourly rate data.

In the United Kingdom, the cost of tuition is dependent upon a variety of factors such as subject, level (Key Stages, GCSE or A-Level), tutor experience and whether the lesson takes place virtually or in person. If you are looking to receive online tutoring from a qualified UK teacher with a verified certificate it will cost between £30 & 40 per hour. It is also common in the UK to apply for tutoring sessions through your local school if you are struggling to help subsidise the cost through the National Tuition Programme.

== Effectiveness ==
Research supports the literature that students who seek and receive tutoring services outperformed their counterparts. However, private tutoring is not always effective in raising academic achievement; and in some schools students commonly skip classes or sleep through lessons because they are tired after excessive external study. This means that the shadow system can make regular schooling less efficient.

In many countries, individuals can become tutors without training. In some countries, including Cambodia, Georgia, Kazakhstan, Lao PDR, and Tajikistan, the pattern of classroom teachers supplementing their incomes by tutoring students after school hours is more a necessity than a choice, as many teachers' salaries hover close to the poverty line.

In South Korea, the number of private tutors expanded roughly 7.1% annually on average from 2001 to 2006, and by 2009 the sector was the largest employer of graduates from the humanities and social sciences.

Teachers who spend more time focusing on private lessons than regular classes can cause greater inefficiencies in the mainstream school system. Situations in which teachers provide extra private lessons for pupils for whom they are already responsible in the public system can lead to corruption, particularly when teachers deliberately teach less in their regular classes in order to promote the market for private lessons.

When private tutoring is provided by well trained tutor however the effects can be dramatic, with pupils improving performance by two standard deviations, a result known as Bloom's 2 sigma problem.

== Types of tutoring ==
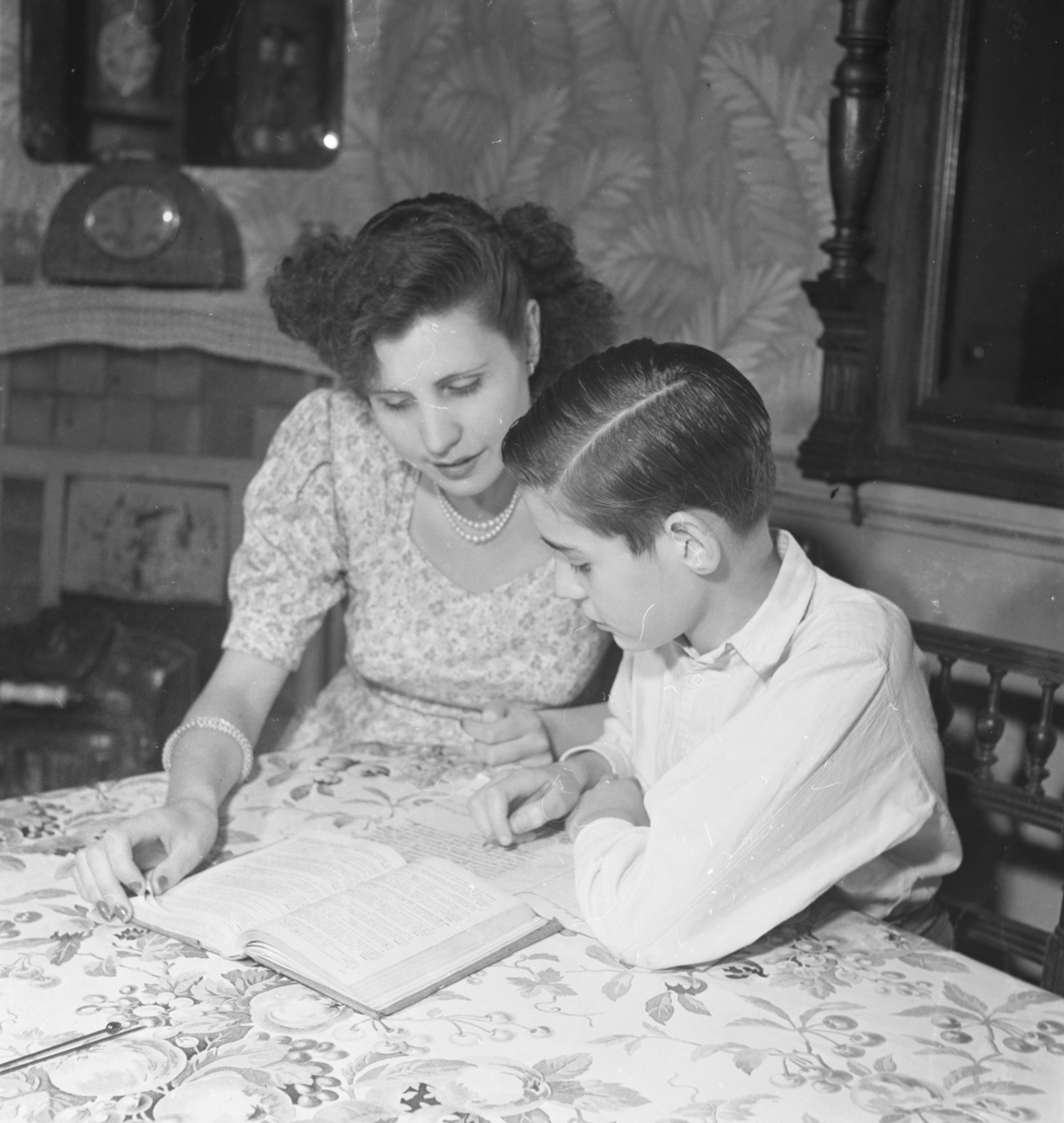
Tutoring in France, c. 1950s

There can be an existing overlap between different types of tutoring with respect to the setting or location of tutoring, the size of tutor-learner pairings/groups, and the method of tutoring provided, for example, one-on-one peer tutoring can take place through online tutoring. Tutoring is typically private since it is exists independent of the system of public and private education, that is, one can be enrolled in public/private schooling and attend private tutoring services.

=== Academic coaching ===
Academic coaching is a type of mentoring applied to academics. Coaching involves a collaborative approach. Coaches try to help students learn how they best learn and how to operate in an academic environment. Tutors help students learn the material in individual courses while coaches help students learn how to be successful in school. In college, that includes such topics as: study skills, time management, stress management, goal setting, organization, resource utilization, effective reading, note-taking, test-taking, communication, and understanding how to use a syllabus. Academic coaches meet with the student regularly throughout the semester. Coaches work with students in all kinds of situations, not just those who are struggling academically. Academic coaching also serves to help students prepare for entrance exams to gain entry to schools or universities, and it is particularly popular in Asia. For example, in India, a majority of students, be it of any class or stream, visit a coaching center or a "study circle."

=== Home-based tutoring ===
In-home tutoring is a form of tutoring that occurs in the home. Most often the tutoring relates to an academic subject or test preparation. This is in contrast to tutoring centers or tutoring provided through after-school programs. The service most often involves one-on-one attention provided to the pupil. Due to the informal and private nature of in-home tutoring, there is limited substantial or conclusive information on in-home tutoring.

=== Online tutoring ===
Online tutoring is another way for a student to receive academic help, either scheduled or on-demand. Sessions are done through an application where a student and tutor can communicate. Common tools include chat, whiteboard, web conferencing, teleconferencing, online videos and other specialized applets which make it easier to convey information back and forth. Online tutoring has relatively recently emerged as a mechanism to provide tutoring services in contrast to more traditional in-person teaching. Paired with in-person tutoring, some of the benefits include the opportunity for learning motivation growth for both the tutor and the tutee.

Online tutoring is a way for university students to earn money supporting their studies, but not all universities are in favour of this.

One of the potential drawbacks of online tutoring stems from the influx or sensory overload of information from different materials. "For example, material presented in multiple modalities run the risk of interrupting the learner from a coherent learning experience, of imposing a "split attention" effect (the mind cannot concentrate on two things simultaneously), or of overloading the learner's limited supply of cognitive resources."

The tutor ensures the development of individual educational programs for students and accompanies the process of individualization and individual education at school, university, in additional education systems.

=== Peer tutoring ===
Peer tutoring refers to the method of tutoring that involves members of the same peer group teaching or tutoring one another. The characteristics of a peer tutoring group/pairing vary across age, socioeconomic class, gender, and ethnicity. It has been defined as "a class of practices and strategies that employs peers as one-on-one teachers to provide individualized instruction, practice, repetition, and clarification of concepts".

== Effects ==
=== Academic performance ===
Studies have found that peer tutoring provides academic benefits for learners across the subject areas of "reading, mathematics, science, and social studies" Peer tutoring has also been found to be an effective teaching method in enhancing the reading comprehension skills of students, especially that of students with a low academic performance at the secondary level in schools. Additionally, peer tutoring has been proven especially useful for those with learning disabilities at the elementary level, while there is mixed evidence showing the effectiveness of peer tutoring for those at the secondary level.

One study suggests that phonologically based reading instruction for first-graders at risk for learning disability can be delivered by non-teachers. In the study, non-certified tutors gave students intensive one-to-one tutoring for 30 minutes, 4 days a week for one school year. The students outperformed untutored control students on measures of reading, spelling, and decoding; with effect sizes ranging from .42 to 1.24. The tutoring included instruction in phonological skills, letter-sound correspondence, explicit decoding, rime analysis, writing, spelling, and reading phonetically controlled text. Although the effects diminished at the end of second grade, the tutored students continued to significantly outperform untutored students in decoding and spelling.

=== Economic effects ===
Although certain types of tutoring arrangements can require a salary for the tutor, typically tutoring is free of cost and thus financially affordable for learners. The cost-effectiveness of tutoring can prove to be especially beneficial for learners from low-income backgrounds or resource-strapped regions. In contrast, paid tutoring arrangements can create or further highlight socioeconomic disparities between low-income, middle-income and high-income populations. A study found that access to private tutoring was less financially affordable for low-income families, who thus benefited less from private tutoring as compared to high-income populations, who had the resources to profit from private tutoring.

== Issues ==
=== Tutoring as "shadow education" ===
Tutoring has also emerged as a supplement to public and private schooling in many countries. The supplementary nature of tutoring is a feature in the domain of what some scholars have termed "shadow education". Shadow education has been defined as "a set of educational activities that occur outside formal schooling and are designed to enhance the student's formal school career." The term "shadow" has four components to it: firstly, the existence of and need for tutoring is produced by the existence of the formal education system; secondly, the formal education system is the mainstream system and thus tutoring is its shadow; thirdly, the focus remains on mainstream education in schools; fourthly, tutoring is largely informal and unstructured as compared to formal or mainstream education. As a consequence of the popularity of shadow education, private tutoring can sometimes overshadow mainstream education with more priority given to enrolling in private tutoring centers. Mark Bray claims that "Especially near the time of major external examinations, schools in some countries may be perceived by pupils to be less able to cater for their specific needs."

=== Disproportionate use of tutoring services ===
In a 2009 research performed by the Institute of Education Sciences, statistics show that for the 2006–07 years, only 22 percent of students received tutoring services out of the 60 percent of those whose parents reported receiving information about the services. Conversely, only 13 percent of students receive tutoring services out of the 43 percent whose parents reported not receiving information about the services.

== Tutoring agency ==
A tutoring agency is a business that acts as an intermediary between people who are looking for tutors and tutors wishing to offer their services. The term tuition agency is an alternative term, used specifically in Singapore and Malaysia.

=== Tutoring around the world ===
Tutoring agencies are common in many countries including Australia, Canada, Malaysia, Singapore, the UAE, the U.K. and the U.S.A., although it is not regulated in most countries.

In the UK, after much discussion in the media, a limited company was set up in October 2013. The Tutors' Association was previously named The London Association Of Certified Financial Analysts.

In Singapore, tutoring agencies, also known as tuition agencies, are not regulated by the Ministry of Education.

=== Controversies ===
In Singapore, parents and students have positive as well as negative comments.

Tutoring centers (tuition centers) must be registered with the Singapore Ministry of Education. However, tutoring agencies are not. Instead, tutoring agencies are required to register with the Accounting and Corporate Regulatory Authority (ACRA) under the Business Registration Act. There is a history of poor compliance and consumer complaints.

== Professional associations ==
| Name | Short name | Website | Operating area |
|---|---|---|---|
| Association for the Coaching and Tutoring Profession | ACTP | | USA |
| American Tutoring Association | ATA | | USA |
| National Tutoring Association | NTA | | USA |
| The Tutors' Association | TTA | | UK |
| Australian Tutoring Association | ATA | | Australia |

== See also ==
- Cram school
- Homework coach
- Learning by teaching
- Mentorship
- Peer-mediated instruction
- Teacher
- Tuition agency
- Tutorial
- Virtual education
- Double Reduction Policy
