= Obesity in China =

Public health issue in China

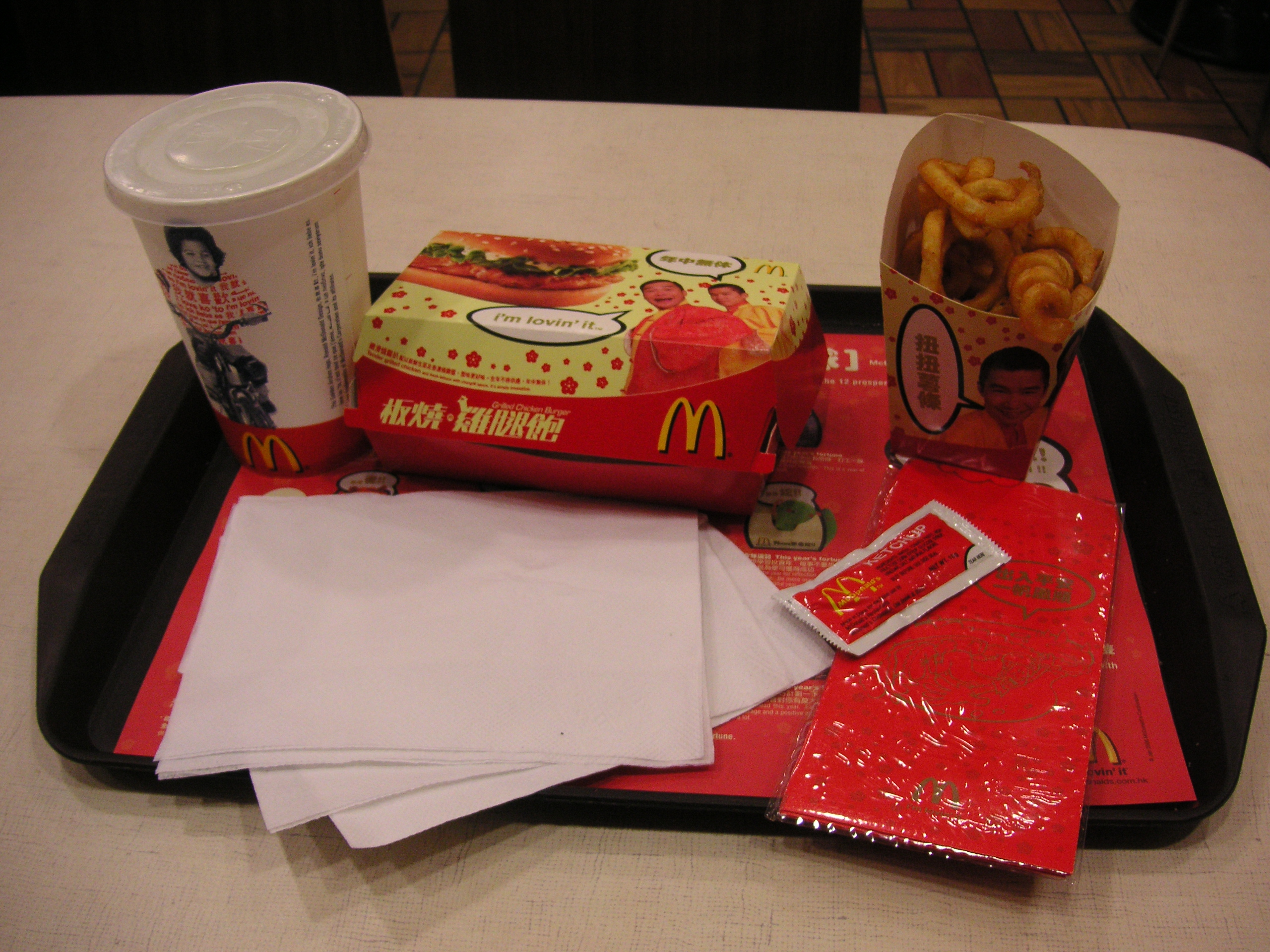
A McDonald's Chinese New Year meal. American fast food outlets have been blamed for the increase in obesity in China.

Obesity in China is a major health concern according to the WHO, with overall rates of obesity between 5% and 6% for the country, but greater than 20% in some cities where fast food is popular.

== Issues ==
Share of adults that are obese, 1975 to 2016

Since 1954, rapid economic growth has transformed China from a destitute nation to one of largest economies in the world. Malnutrition, previously a persistent problem, has declined from 30% of the population in 1980 to less than 12% in 2014. However, these rapid improvements in living standards have come with rising rates of obesity that threaten to reverse some of the gains in overall health.

These changes are especially pronounced in Chinese cities, where increase caloric intake has combined with increased automation and transport that has reduced daily physical labor for the average citizen. Rapid motorization has drastically reduced levels of cycling and walking in China. Reports in 2002 and 2012 have revealed a direct correlation between ownership of motorized transport by households in China and increasing obesity related problems in children and adults.

Growth in obesity in children has been especially brisk. Between 1985 and 2014, obesity in rural Chinese boys grew from 0.03% to 17.2%, and the obesity rate for girls went from 0.12% to 9.1%. Statistics from the Chinese Health Ministry have revealed that urban Chinese boys age 6 are 2.5 inches taller and 6.6 pounds heavier on average than Chinese city boys 30 years ago. A leading child-health researcher, Ji Chengye, has stated that, "China has entered the era of obesity. The speed of growth is shocking."

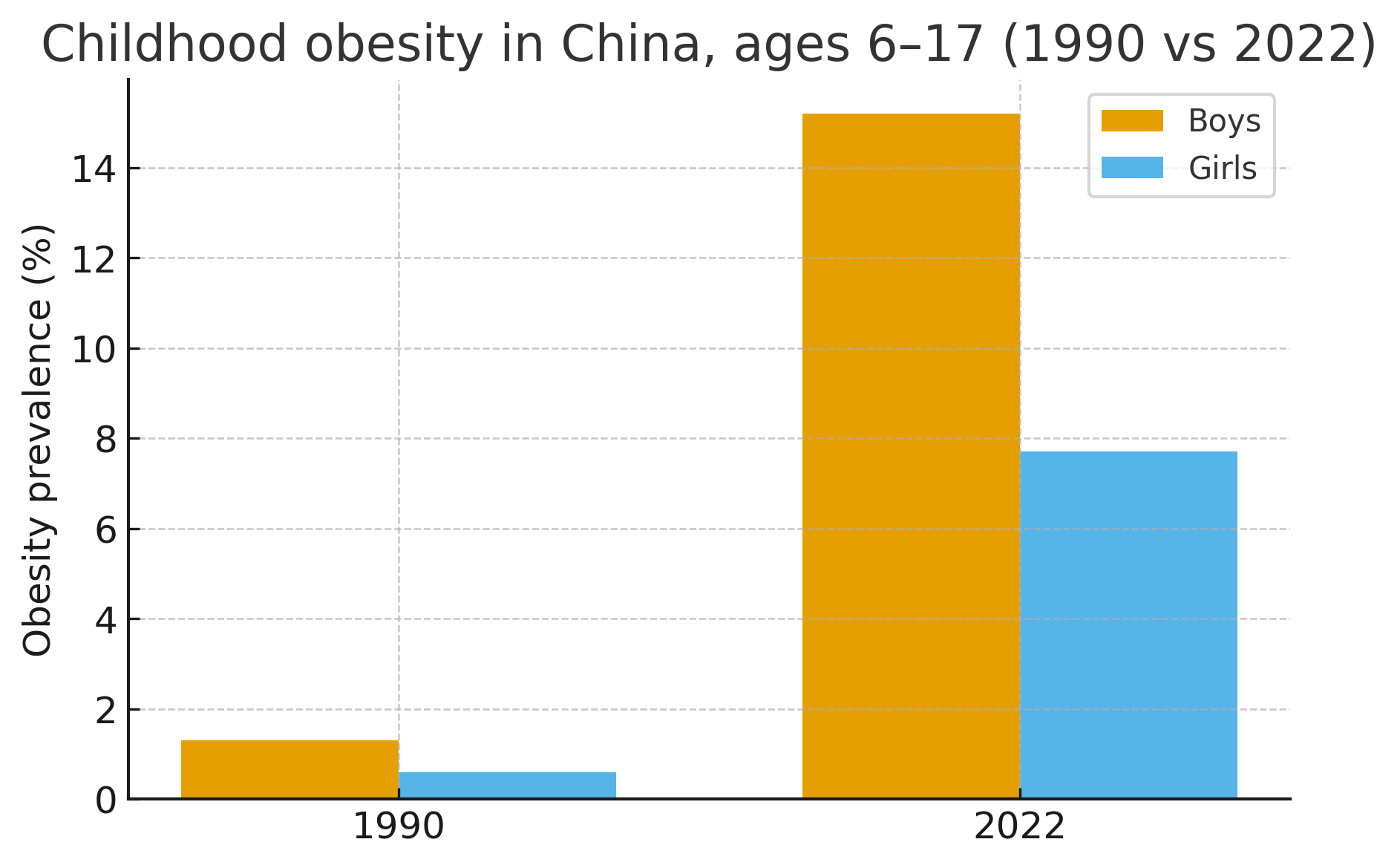
China child obesity 1990 vs. 2022

Recent national data show that childhood obesity in China has risen dramatically in recent decades, with prevalence among boys increasing from 1.3% in 1990 to 15.2% in 2022 and among girls from 0.6% to 7.7% over the same period.

== Response and prospects ==
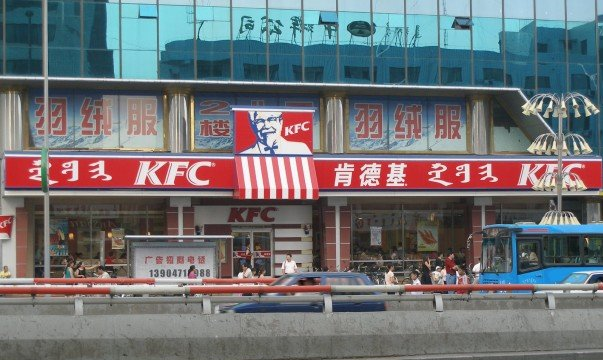
A KFC outlet in Hohhot, China

According to Wang Longde, Chinese Vice Minister of Health, the problem is that the population does not have enough awareness and lacks knowledge of nutrition and what constitutes a reasonable diet. The government is attempting to reduce the problem with building more playgrounds and passing a law which requires students to exercise or play sports for an hour a day at school. Chen Chunming, an expert at the Chinese Center for Disease Control and Prevention has warned against the rapid growth of American fast-food outlets in China saying, "Don't take children to eat fast food like McDonald's and KFC."

De-emphasis on sports also plays an important part in the rise of obesity in China. Many Chinese people believe the way they advance in life is getting a better education so they can get a better job. The emphasis on schoolwork and the pressure to do so much into that direction keeps children away from play and from physical activity.

Fat farms, where overweight children try to lose their excess weight, have grown since the 1990s. In 2000, 100 million people were reported to suffer from high blood pressure and 26 million with diabetes. These figures were expected to double within a decade, with doctors warning that obesity could become China's biggest health threat for future generations.

== Action and policy ==
Due to the current cultural views on obesity there is a significant need for anti-obesity education. Obesity is often associated with prosperity, thus there is a need for a widespread attitude shift to decrease the current rising rates. Perhaps resulting from the famines of generations past, food, specifically high-fat foods, are now seen as a luxurious item. With growing incomes in Chinese society, families are now able to afford these unhealthy but highly desired foods resulting in increasing rates of consumption of high-fat diets. As a major contributor to the spread of obesity, these high-fat diets are creating a major public health problem across the country. There are currently a few initiatives in place that could help combat this problem, but because of its magnitude, it is likely that more improvements are needed.

The Chinese Nutrition Society is providing nutrition education by creating dietary guidelines to help consumers make more healthy lifestyle choices. These guidelines become useful in assisting the population in adopting healthy eating habits which can be an important preventative measure against obesity. Additionally, the Chinese government is currently mandating programs in schools to deal with the growing problem of obesity in the younger generations. "Eat Smart at School" is a campaign that was launched during the 2006–2007 school year, which aims to cultivate healthy eating practices to promote lifestyle changes in the educational setting. This program is also an important key in teaching healthy lifestyle strategies that can promote long-term changes in these children's lives.

Localizing community based interventions could help address the large, diverse population in China. China is currently trying to utilize community based interventions through The National Plan of Action for Nutrition in China. This demonstrates an extensive framework organizing food-based policies relating to the country's nutrition and health issues. Some of the policies work towards promoting healthy diets and lifestyles while also providing incentives to food growers. Implementing nationwide social programs on public nutrition through mass media, public campaigns and community based promotions are potentially effective mediums towards combating obesity in China.

In 2024, China launched the "Weight Management Year" initiative for three consecutive years within the "Healthy China 2030" framework.

== See also ==
- Health in China
- Little Emperor Syndrome
- Epidemiology of obesity
