= Hsu Fu Chi =

Chinese snacks manufacturer

The logo of Hsu Fu Chi

Hsu Fu Chi (Chinese: 徐福记; pinyin: Xú Fú Jì) is a Chinese company, based in Dongguan, China, that manufactures various confectionaries, biscuits, chocolates, jellies, sachima, and snacks. The company is owned by Nestlé.

== History ==
=== Beginnings and independent growth ===
In 1992, Mekey Hsu Chen founded Hsu Fu Chi in The People's Republic of China. In 1994, the brand was trademarked in the PRC. In 1997, Transpac invested in the company, and the brand became the top-selling brand in China for ten years; in 2008, they were relegated to the number 2 position, after Mars, Inc. Hsu Fu Chi was the first company to introduce the "Pick and Mix" format in China, in which consumers can pick various kinds of confectionaries out of tubs instead of picking only one kind.

In 2000, Hsu Fu Chi began to build a distribution network across China. In 2004, they created the world's first fully automated sachima plant. They were listed on a stock exchange in Singapore in 2006: the SGX ST in 2006, one of the first Chinese confectionery companies to be listed on a stock exchange, and the first to be listed on the SGX.

They opened at factory in Zhumadian, China, in 2010. Over five years, from 2007 to 2012, their profits grew 17%.

=== Acquisition by Nestlé ===
In 2011, the company entered talks with several companies for the sale of the company. On 11 July 2011, Nestlé, the largest food company in the world, paid $1.7 billion for a 60 percent stake in Hsu Fu Chi International, which is about 3.3 times the sales figures of Hsu Fu Chi for the stake. Nestlé agreed to buy 43.5 percent of Hsu Fu Chi's shares at S$4.35. If the scheme was approved by independent shareholders, Nestlé would then acquire a 16.5 percent stake from the Hsu family, which would leave them with 40 percent.

On 6 December 2011, the government of the People's Republic of China and the government of The Cayman Islands (where the company was incorporated) accepted Nestlé's bid, and allowed Nestlé to proceed in its acquisition. Nestlé acquired the remaining shares from the Hsu family in 2025.
