= Virtusa =

Information technology consulting company

Virtusa Corporation
- Type: Private
- Industry: Information technology services
- Founded: 1996; 30 years ago
- Founders: Kris Canekeratne; Tushara Canekeratne; John Gillis; Sandy Gillis
- Headquarters: Southborough, Massachusetts, United States
- Area served: Worldwide
- Key people: Nitesh Banga (CEO)
- Services: Digital engineering, IT consulting, business consulting, application development, product development, legacy asset management
- Revenue: ▲US$1.8 billion (2023)
- Net income: ▲US$72 million (2023)
- Total assets: ▲US$1.337 billion (2020)
- Total equity: ▲US$397 million (2020)
- Number of employees: ▲35,000 (2023)
- Parent: BPEA
- Website: www.virtusa.com

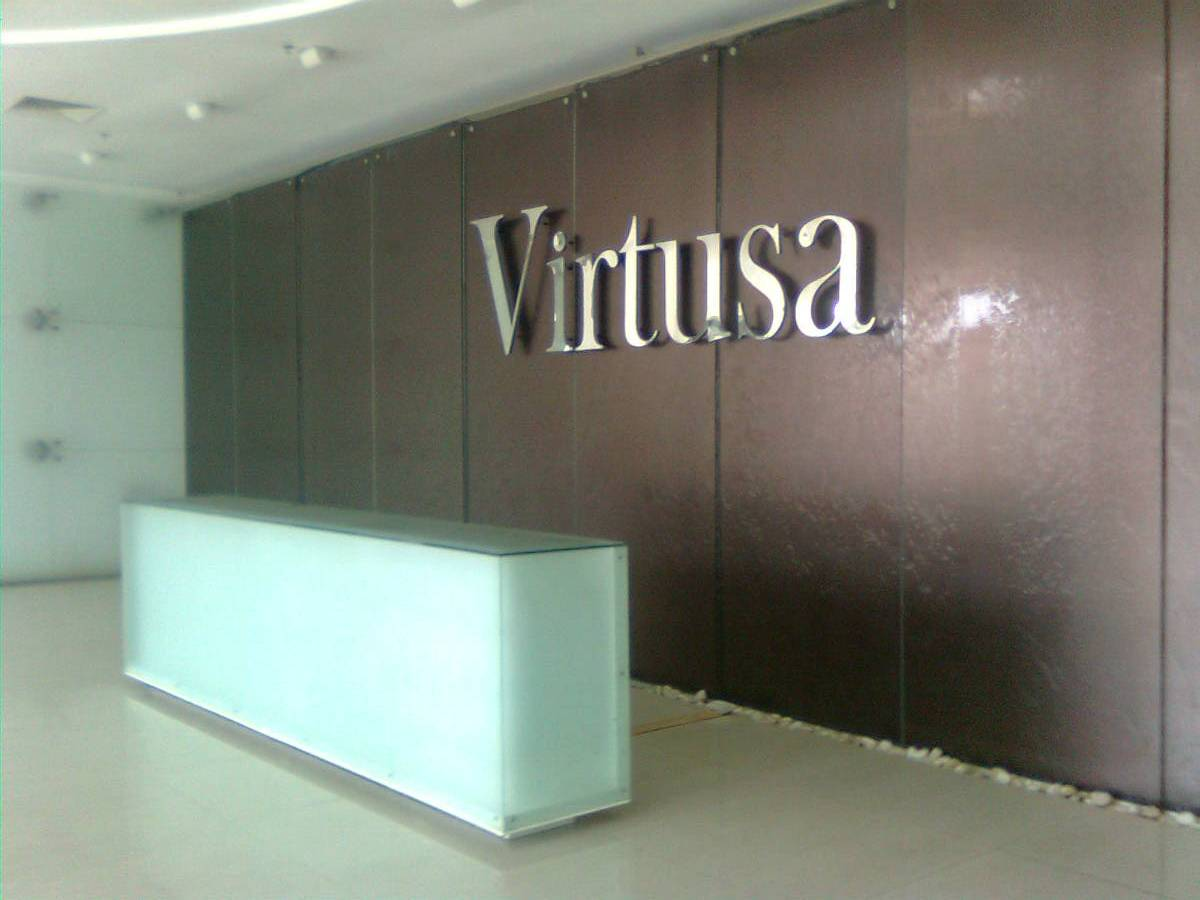
Virtusa at Orion City Sri Lanka

Virtusa Corporation is an American information technology services company, based in Southborough, Massachusetts. It provides IT consulting, business consulting, and outsourcing services. It was founded in 1996 in Sri Lanka.

The company has several delivery centers in India and Sri Lanka with the ones in Hyderabad, Chennai and Colombo being the largest. In February 2021, Baring Private Equity Asia acquired the company for US$2 billion.

== History ==
Virtusa was co-founded in 1996 by Kris Canekeratne, who was the company's chairman until his departure in 2021. He was CEO from 1996 to 1997 and again from 2000 to 2021. Canekeratne stepped down as CEO in May 2021, and his seat as chairman was filled by Sander van't Noordende.

The company went public in 2007.

== Acquisitions ==
In November 2009, Virtusa acquired technology consulting company Insource for $7.3 million.

In 2010, Virtusa acquired ConVista Consulting, LLC, a US-based provider of collection, disbursement, claims and billing services.

In 2011, Virtusa acquired ALaS Consulting LLC, a financial services consulting firm.

In November 2013, Virtusa acquired OSB Consulting LLC, a New Jersey–based consulting firm.

In January 2014, Virtusa acquired TradeTech Consulting Scandinavia AB, a Stockholm-based provider of treasury and asset management IT services in the Nordic countries.

In April 2015, Virtusa acquired Apparatus, Inc., an IT infrastructure services provider headquartered in Indianapolis, Indiana, US. In November of that same year, Virtusa acquired a 53% stake in Polaris Consulting & Services Limited, India, a provider of IT services primarily to banking and financial services.

On 12 March 2018, Virtusa Corporation acquired eTouch Systems Corp. and eTouch Systems Pvt. Ltd.

In September 2023, Virtusa acquired the Walnut Creek–headquartered creative agency, Factor Creative, for an undisclosed amount.

In February 2024, Virtusa acquired BRIGHT, a Bulgaria-based IT services firm. In April of the same year, Virtusa acquired ITMAGINATION, a Warsaw, Poland-based technology company.

In May 2025, Virtusa acquired Mav3rick, an Australia-based Salesforce and MuleSoft advisory and implementation partner. In July of the same year, Virtusa acquired Sincera, a software development company.
