= World Stock Exchange =

- Type: Stock exchange
- Industry: Video games
- Genre: Simulation Game, Role-playing video game
- Founded: 2007
- Headquarters: Melbourne, Australia
- Key people: Luke Connell
- Website: https://www.wselive.com

The World Stock Exchange (WSE) was a virtual stock exchange created by Hope Capital Pty. Ltd. of Melbourne, Australia and managed by CEO, Luke Connell.

The game opened on 5 March 2007 and first appeared in the virtual world of Second Life. Transactions occurred outside of Second Life on the WSE website. The game initially used the Linden Dollar currency from Second Life and in July 2007 integrated a new virtual currency called the World Internet Currency (WIC, WICS, W$). The WIC currency, similar to the Linden Dollar, could be converted to/from USD. In its first 25 days, the WSE generated $200,000 in trading volume. Players of the game were not legally protected as with a real stock exchange, instead trading was governed by the Linden Labs terms of service and the listing rules created by Connell.

In July 2007, an avatar with inside information hacked the WSE computers and made off with 3.2 million LD (or about $12,000US). The WSE shut down temporarily to investigate and perform system upgrades. As a result, WSE software development and upgrades were moved in house and positions were no longer available to anonymous Second Life avatars. The incident sparked debate over the WSE's classification as a game since the virtual currency, Linden Dollars, were able to be exchanged for real money. Connell maintained that no crime had occurred since all transactions and companies involved in the game were fictional. He blamed the backlash against the WSE on a few disenchanted companies whose initial stock offerings failed to perform to their expectations. Shania Stewart, whose avatar first reported the theft had her company delisted from the WSE shortly thereafter. She later told BusinessWeek that the delisting occurred because "she believed the exchange had no intention of disclosing what happened". Linden Labs declined to comment on the incident.

The WSE halted trading on 9 November 2008, pending an announcement. According to the 30 November 2008 announcement, the WSE planned to delist any remaining Second Life-based companies and would not reopen until late January 2009. In August 2009, WSE released a new announcement indicating that delays in the development process prevented meeting the earlier launch dates and the game was tentatively set to re-launch on 1 September 2009. The exchange never re-opened.

While the site still claims that a new version of the exchange will be "coming soon", the main site still shows the same 24 April 2010 announcement as of September 2013. Some of the Second Life investors who still held a balance in the WSE at the time it ceased operations were unable to withdraw their Linden Dollar or WICS balances.
