= Wall Street English =

Provider of English language instruction

- Industry: Education
- Founded: September 1972
- Headquarters: Hong Kong
- Area served: Worldwide
- Owner: EQT Private Capital Asia and CITIC Capital
- Website: www.wallstreetenglish.com

Wall Street English, formerly Wall Street Institute, is an international English language learning academy for adults, teens and business customers. Wall Street English was established in 1972 in Italy by Italian Luigi Tiziano Peccenini. The company has over 3 million alumni with a current enrolment of 180,000 students. Using a franchise model, Wall Street English currently operates over 450 centers in 35 countries in North Africa, East Asia, Southeast Asia, Europe, Latin America, and the Middle East.

Wall Street English's curriculum is aligned to the Common European Framework of Reference for Languages (CEFR), according to a study undertaken with the support of the University of Cambridge English for Speakers of Other Languages Examination group (ESOL).

Its international offices are located in Barcelona, Spain and Hong Kong. Previously its headquarters were in Baltimore.

== History ==
The first Wall Street Institute centers opened in Italy in 1972, and within two years 24 new centers opened across Italy. In 1983, Wall Street Institute expanded outside of Italy, and by the late 1980s Wall Street Institute was well established across Europe. Expansion continued through the early 1990s, when centers were opened in Mexico, Chile, and Venezuela. Beginning in the late 1990s, Wall Street Institute expanded into the Middle East and then to Asia, which has grown to be a significant part of its business.

In 1997, Wall Street Institute was purchased by Sylvan Learning Systems. In 2005, Wall Street Institute was acquired by the global private equity firm The Carlyle Group. Wall Street English was acquired by Pearson plc from an affiliate of The Carlyle Group and CITIC Private Equity for $92 million in cash in 2010. In 2017 Pearson sold it to EQT Private Capital Asia formerly known as Baring Private Equity Asia and CITIC Capital for around $300 million.

In 2013, the company adopted Wall Street English as its universal name, while also launching a rebranding and introducing a new logo.

== Countries ==
Wall Street English has centers in Algeria, Argentina, Chile, Colombia, Czech Republic, Dominican Republic, Ecuador, France, Germany, Guatemala, Hong Kong SAR, Indonesia, Israel, Italy, Kazakhstan, Laos, Libya, Mexico, Mongolia, Morocco, Myanmar, Oman, Panama, Peru, Portugal, Saudi Arabia, South Korea, Spain, Switzerland, Thailand, Tunisia, Turkey, Uruguay, Venezuela, and Vietnam.

Wall Street English operated more than 70 centers in China, which was its biggest market. Wall Street English closed in China following China's institution of the Double Reduction Policy.

== Curriculum ==
The Wall Street English program is designed for all levels of learners. They have 20 different levels of English language courses ranging from beginner to advanced. Their program includes an English-only environment in their centers, highly qualified English-speaking teachers, social activities that allow students to practice English in a social, non-threatening environment, and a global online student community.

The Wall Street English Blended Learning Method, created by Luigi Tiziano Peccenini and Luciano Biondo, combines different education methods of acquiring a language into one study cycle. The Blended Learning Method includes self-study, small teacher-led classes, and practice time. Students listen, read, write, speak, and practice English to gain a deep understanding of the language.
