= Vistra (services company) =

Market research organizations

Vistra Limited
- Industry: Professional services
- Founded: 1986
- Headquarters: Singapore, Hong Kong
- Key people: Kim Jenkins (CEO); Andrew Cherry (Chief financial officer); Mel Fitzpatrick (Chief Purpose and People Officer); Karen Bennett (Chief Delivery Officer); Chris Collins (Chief Corporate Development Officer); John McLean (General counsel and Chief Legal Officer); Abdel Hmitti (President (corporate title), Fund Solutions); Jonathon Clifton (Group Managing Director); Simon Filmer (Deputy Group Managing Director); Ernest Zheng (Managing Director, China); Helen Soh (Managing Director, Singapore); Nadine Feng (Managing Director, Taiwan); Effy Yeung (Executive Director, Hong Kong); Jessica Far (Executive Director, Hong Kong)
- Services: Corporate services; Fund Administration; International incorporations; Post incorporation technical support; On-going corporate services
- Number of employees: 10000 employees("December 2025") 3000 employees(June 2017)
- Parent: Baring Private Equity Asia
- Website: vistra.com

Vistra is a provider of essential business services headquartered in Singapore, providing payroll & HR, tax & accounting, legal entity management, regulatory compliance, and SPV and fund management services. Vistra were merged with Tricor, by BPEA EQT, in 2023 and rebranded the following year.

== History ==
Vistra was established in Hong Kong in 1986 (as Offshore Incorporation Limited (OIL) and quickly grew its service offerings and expanded its geographic coverage. IK Partners acquired Vistra in August 2009, and subsequently divested to Baring Private Equity Asia in October 2015. During this time (In 2011), OIL merged with Vistra before completely rebranding to Vistra in 2017.

In 2012, Vistra Fund Services launched Vistra Fund Services Asia Limited in Hong Kong, complementing the group’s fund administration operations in Jersey and Luxembourg.

In 2023, BPEA EQT merged Vistra and Tricor in a $6.5 billion deal.

In March 2025, Vistra launched Geni, a global AI compliance advisor, built into its Global Expansion Platform.

In May 2025, Vistra acquired iiPay to grow its corporate services, followed by a acquisiton of Biz Latin Hub (BLH) in December 2025.

== Vistra 2030 ==
Since 2010, Vistra and its predecessor Offshore Incorporation Limited (OIL) have published a series of industry market research reports focusing on trends in corporate services, international regulation, and cross-border financial centres.

In 2017, the publication series was renamed Vistra 2020, expanding its scope to cover global tax transparency, macroeconomic instability, and regulatory changes following major geopolitical events such as Brexit. The report series was later rebranded as Vistra 2030 in October 2020 to track long-term shifts in global entity management, international compliance, and cross-border business integration. Subsequent editions in September 2023 focused on globalization trends and in April 2025, was a regional edition from Asia on corporate compliance, artificial intelligence integration, and entity incorporation landscapes.

Previous Publications:

- “Looking forward: An industry on the move”, 2014 edition
- “Perception and Reality: Forces driving the offshore industry”, 2013 edition
- “Opportunities and Challenges Facing the Offshore Industry”, 2012 edition
- “Insights into future trends and structure of the offshore industry”, 2011 edition
- "Insights into the evolution of offshore financial services in the region and what is driving it, 2010 edition

== Client solutions and services ==
Vistra provides corporate and fund administration services, including global payroll, human resources advisory, tax and accounting, corporate secretarial, legal entity management, regulatory compliance, and fund administration.

In June 2025, Vistra acquired multi-country payroll platform iiPay. The company also operates Vistra Fund Solutions, which manages administration services for alternative and traditional funds, as well as special purpose vehicles (SPVs).

In March 2025, the company launched its Global Expansion Platform (GEP), an online portal designed for global entity management, business incorporation, and account opening, integrated with an AI-driven compliance advisory tool named Geni.

== Awards and accolades ==
- NelsonHall NEAT 2025 – Leader in Global Payroll NEAT Analysis
- Everest PEAK 2025 – Star Performer & Major Contender in Everest Multi-country Payroll PEAK assessment
- Hong Kong Business Technology Excellence Awards 2025 – Software – Business Services
- PanFinance Awards 2025 – Best Fund Administration Services Provider
- Private Equity Wire European Awards 2025 – ManCo of the Year
- With Intelligence HFM Asia Services Awards 2025 – Best middle office service provider

== See also ==
- Offshore Financial Centre
