= Luigi Peccenini =

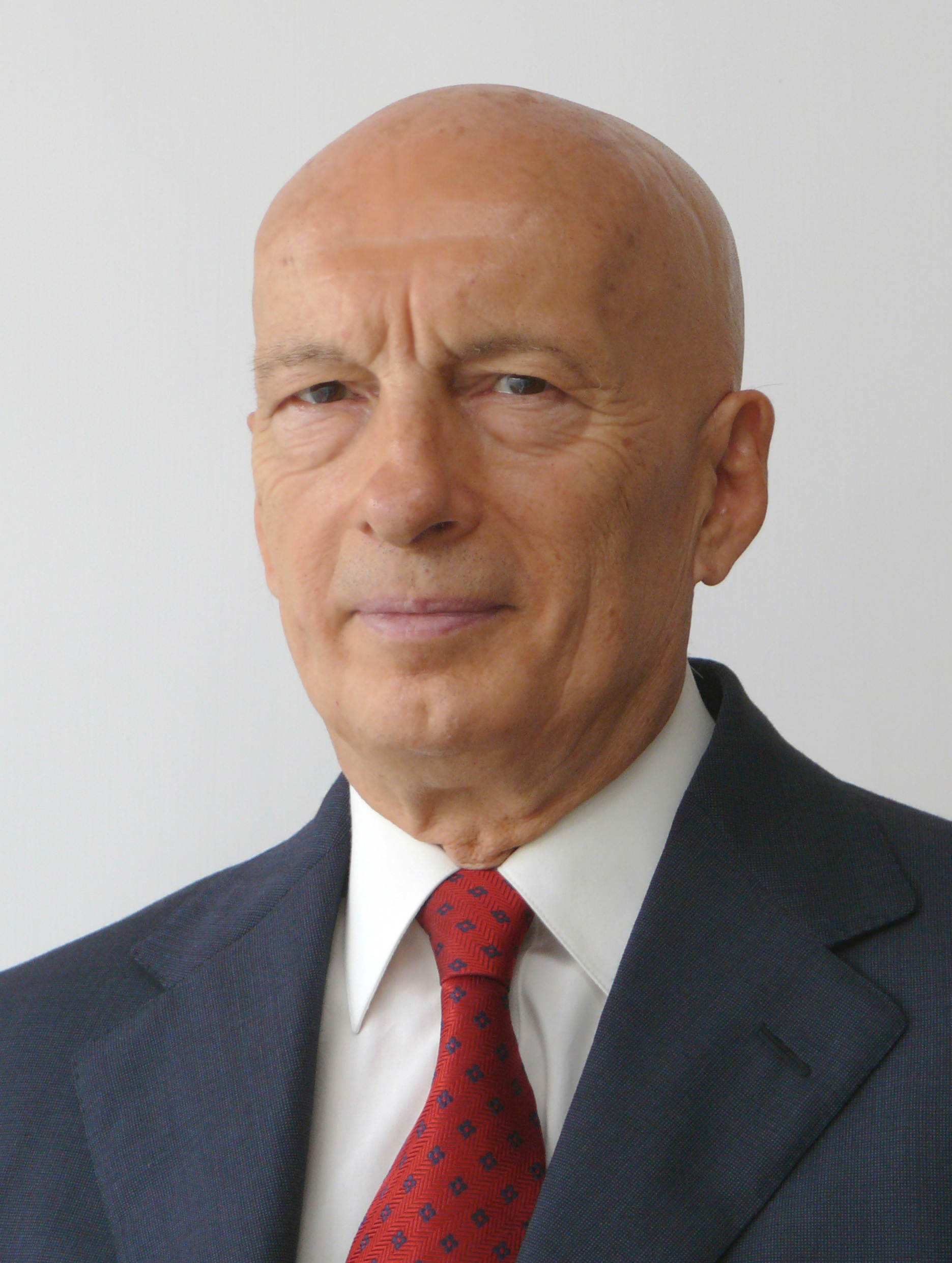
- Peccenini in 2007
- Born: 1939 (age 86–87); Ferrara, Kingdom of Italy
- Occupations: Honorary president of Wall Street Institute International and Wall Street English China.; General advisor at Laureate International Universities in China.; General advisor at WorldStrides in China.; Guest professor at the Beijing Normal University.; Guest professor at the Shanghai International Studies University.; Guest professor at the Hunan International Economics University.; Adjunct professor at the Shanghai Jiao Tong University.
- Children: 2

Luigi Tiziano "Pecce" Peccenini (born 1939) is a learning innovator, entrepreneur, company advisor and educator and speaker on health, happiness and success in business. He is best known for having founded Wall Street English (originally Wall Street Institute) in 1972 to commercialise MultiMethod, a learning methodology that he devised that is student- rather than teacher-centric.

Wall Street Institute teaches people to speak (as opposed to read or write) English as a foreign language. It has provided MultiMethod instruction to over 2 million students. It operates centers in North Africa, East Asia, South East Asia, Europe, Latin America and the Middle East. It is branded as Wall Street English in China where it was voted the most renowned Foreign Language Teaching Brand of 2012.

== Early life and career ==
Peccenini was born, brought up and schooled in Ferrara, Italy, the only child of a modest family. An early aptitude for football, and his role as team captain, helped him to hone the leadership skills that he would later come to need in business. On leaving school he eschewed a university degree because of the financial implications for his parents and instead went directly into a succession of sales-based and management jobs.

== Computex ==
In 1968, he set up Computex to provide training for programmers operating mainframes. He sourced manuals from IBM, Siemens, Honeywell and General Electric called ‘Programmed Instruction’, i.e. self-training handbooks with multiple-choice questions. They had answers at the end of the book so that trainees could check they were answering the questions correctly. He removed the answers and replaced the checking process with a teacher. Students would study a manual at home, in their own time and at their own pace. When ready, they would go to Computex to have a tutorial with a teacher. One student might need to study at home for three hours, another 10 hours, another three days, and so on.

== Wall Street Institute ==
Whilst running Computex, Peccenini studied at the weekends and earned a BA in Foreign Languages and Literature from Bocconi University in Milan.

In 1972 he adapted his Computex learning methodology to the teaching of English as a foreign language and established Wall Street Institute in Milan to market it. He later franchised the business to fuel expansion and over the next few years over 50 centers opened in Italy.

In the early 1980s an investment in proprietary courseware for the business proved too onerous to sustain. Peccenini had invested all his money into developing English Online, a state-of-the-art multimedia language instructional program. He had also borrowed heavily from banks and individual investors, planning to meet his heavy financial exposure through high sales. But it didn't work out. As a result, his company closed down. The franchisees were able to continue their activity, but disconnected from his company. "I lost everything, including my health", he said. "But I didn't lose my desire or let go of my vision."

In 1986, Peccenini placed an advertisement in Switzerland in search of a business partner with capital to invest. He found one and together they set up Wall Street Institute Switzerland and eventually he regained control of its Italian operations.

In 1987, Peccenini expanded to Spain. In 1997 he sold the company to Sylvan Learning Systems. In 2000 he founded Wall Street English in China where he is known as Li Wenhao. In 2005 he sold Wall Street English to The Carlyle Group.

== MultiMethod ==
MultiMethod does away with the pitfalls of adult evening or weekend classes, namely, students of unequal ability competing for the teacher's attention and a fixed timetable leading to missed classes. It permits students to choose their own hours of attendance at a learning center and follow a pace in tune with their personal requirements. They are free to use the resources of the center whenever they like. They learn new material on their own with the help of proprietary multimedia courseware. At successive trigger points they book onto a tutorial to reinforce their learning with a native-English speaker. They need never miss a tutorial since each one is repeated every few days. Tutorials are restricted to a maximum of four similarly-abled students. Students pay to achieve a certain level of ability and attend as many hours as they wish during the contract period until they achieve their objective.

== Seminars on business and life skills ==
Peccenini continues contributing to the education of younger generations through his seminars at universities and business forums where he lectures in English, Italian and Spanish on entrepreneurship, leadership, human relations and a healthy lifestyle. His contribution to the education of university students has led to his appointment as guest/adjunct professor at four universities in China.
