= Third Xiangya Hospital of Central South University =

The Third Xiangya Hospital of Central South University (Chinese: 中南大学湘雅三医院)
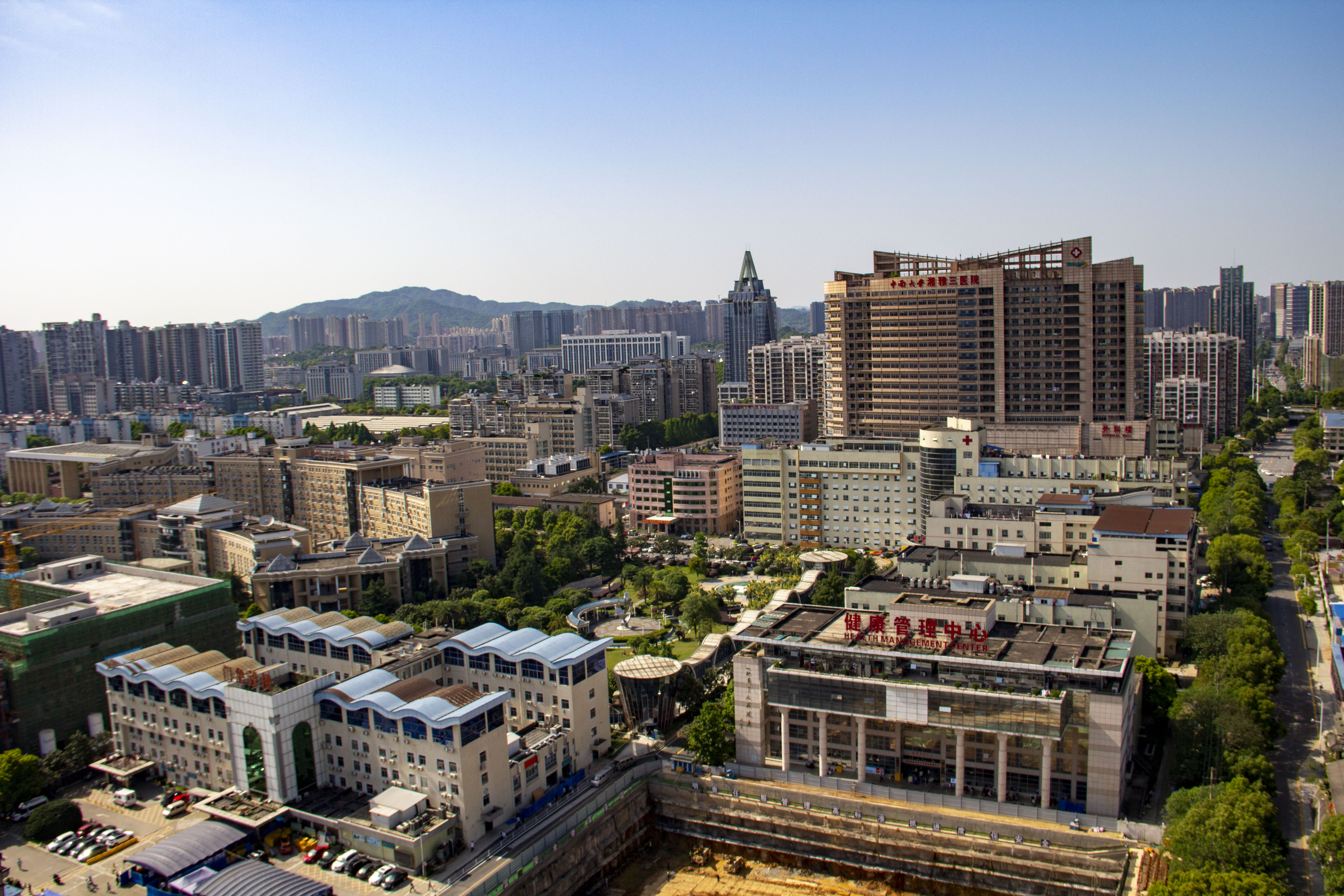
- Third Xiangya Hospital (the new campus of Xiangya Medical College is located to its west)

Geography
- Location: No. 138, Tongzipo Road, Yuelu District, Changsha City, Hunan Province, China
- Coordinates: 28.22394°N 112.93957°E

Organisation
- Type: public, 3A

Services
- Beds: 2,200

History
- Founded: 1989

Links
- Website: www.xy3yy.com

The Third Xiangya Hospital of Central South University, shortly Third Xiangya Hospital, is the only Grade A tertiary hospital directly under the National Health Commission located in the western part of Changsha, China. Founded in 1989, the Third Xiangyan Hospital has developed into a large-scale comprehensive hospital integrating medical treatment, teaching and research. The hospital is a national research base of human organ transplantation, and ranks national top-10 in health management.

== History ==
In 1989, the Third Xiangya Hospital of Central South University was founded in the Yuelu District of western Changsha (foundation stone was laid).

In 1992, the hospital started operation.

In 1998, the hospital passed the "Grade A Tertiary Hospital" standard assessment. In the same year, the first kidney transplant operation of the hospital was successfully carried out.

In 2005, the Transplant Medicine Engineering and Technology Research Center affiliated with Ministry of Health was officially established in this hospital.

In 2008, the first clinical research protocol for xenotransplantation in the world, called the Changsha Communique, was developed in the Third Xiangya Hospital.

In 2018, the international organ transplantation experts gathered at the Third Hospital again to further develop the Changsha Communique. And the hospital was awarded the first clinical application license in the world for living porcine cell transplantation.

In 2025, Hunan Province's first "Standardized Diagnosis and Treatment Center for Acute Myeloid Leukemia" was officially established at Xiangya Third Hospital.

== Other information ==
The Third Xiangya Hospital is a leader in transplant medicine, minimally invasive medicine and health management. It is a national research base of human organ transplantation in China, leading in the number of successful transplants of liver, kidney, and intestinal, etc.

The hospital covers a land area of 203,600 square meters, and has 3,480 staff members. There are 2,200 designated beds.

The hospital has been ranked A+ in the national performance appraisal of tertiary public hospitals for seven years running. It ranks national top-10 in health management.

The Third Xiangya Hospital has 17 national key clinical specialties and construction projects.

There are teaching programs for undergraduate, postgraduate and postdoctoral students, including international students.

In academic research, the hospital published 54 papers listed in Nature Index for the Time frame of 1 June 2025 - 30 May 2026, ranking 216th globally and 92nd in China in healthcare. In addition, they have also published one article in Science (journal).

The hospital has received numerous honors, including the "National Advanced Collective of the Health System", "National Youth Civilization Unit" and "Hunan Provincial Garden-style Hospital".

Address: No. 138 Tongzipo Road, Yuelu District, Changsha City, Hunan Province, Chian.

== Medical Accident ==
Meng Jie, director of the Department of Respiratory and Critical Care Medicine at Xiangya Third Hospital, allowed her students to conduct bronchoscopy and other medical activities independently, resulting in two deaths of patients after bronchoscopy in May and August 2022.

== See also ==
- Xiangya Hospital
- Xiangya School of Medicine
- Central South University
- List of hospitals in China
