= Zhang Youshang =

Chinese biochemist (1925–2022)

- 张友尚
- Born: 2 November 1925; Changsha, Hunan, China
- Died: 23 December 2022 (aged 97); Shanghai, China
- Education: Zhejiang University; Shanghai Institute of Biochemistry; University of Cambridge
- Scientific career
- Fields: Biochemistry; molecular biology
- Workplaces: Shanghai Institutes for Biological Sciences

Chinese name
- Simplified Chinese: 张友尚
- Traditional Chinese: 張友尚
Transcriptions
Standard Mandarin
- Hanyu Pinyin: Zhāng Yǒushàng
- IPA: [ʈʂáŋ jòʊ.ʂâŋ]

Zhang Youshang (Chinese: 张友尚; 2 November 1925 – 23 December 2022) was a Chinese biochemist, professor and vice-president of the Shanghai Institute of Biochemistry and Cell Biology. He was a member of the Chinese Academy of Sciences and served as chief editor of the peer-reviewed journal Acta Biochimica et Biophysica Sinica (ABBS). His research was focused on protein structures and insulin.

== Personal life and education ==
Zhang was born on 2 November 1925, in Changsha, Hunan. His father, Zhang Xiaoqian, was a founder of gastroenterology in China and a professor at Peking Union Medical College. Each of his two elder sisters and younger brother are biochemists or physicians. He studied at the Sino-French Comte School in Beijing, and when the Second Sino-Japanese War began in 1937, he moved with his family to Changsha, where he studied at Yali School run by Yale-in-China.

Zhang graduated from Zhejiang University in 1948, and earned a master's degree from the Shanghai Institute of Biochemistry in 1961, where he studied under Professor Cao Tianqin. On recommendations of Cao and Wang Yinglai, the president of the institute, he studied at the University of Cambridge in England from 1964 to 1966. He was the only student at Cambridge from mainland China at the time. He returned to China just before the start of the Cultural Revolution, during which he was persecuted for his association with Cambridge scientist Joseph Needham, who was accused of being a British spy.

=== Death ===
Zhang died in Shanghai on 23 December 2022, at age 97.

== Career ==
His research was focused on protein structures and insulin. He separated re-synthesised insulin in pure crystal form and demonstrated that it had an identical three-dimensional structure with natural insulin. His other contributions include the production of crystal insulin using enzyme promotion, the creation of a new technique to synthesize pig insulin, the synthesis of recombinant human insulin using yeast cells, and research of the crystal structure of the protein subunit of the tobacco mosaic virus.

Zhang was a longtime professor at the Shanghai Institute of Biochemistry and Cell Biology and formerly served as vice-president of the institute. He also taught as a visiting professor at ETH Zurich in Switzerland and the University of York in England. He was elected as a member of the Chinese Academy of Sciences in 2001. In 2015, Shanghai Jiao Tong University Press published his biography entitled The Pioneer of Insulin: The Biography of Zhang Youshang (Chinese: 胰岛素探秘者: 张友尚传), written by Du Yanyong (杜严勇).
