= Second Xiangya Hospital of Central South University =

Hospital in Changsha, Hunan, China

- Central South University
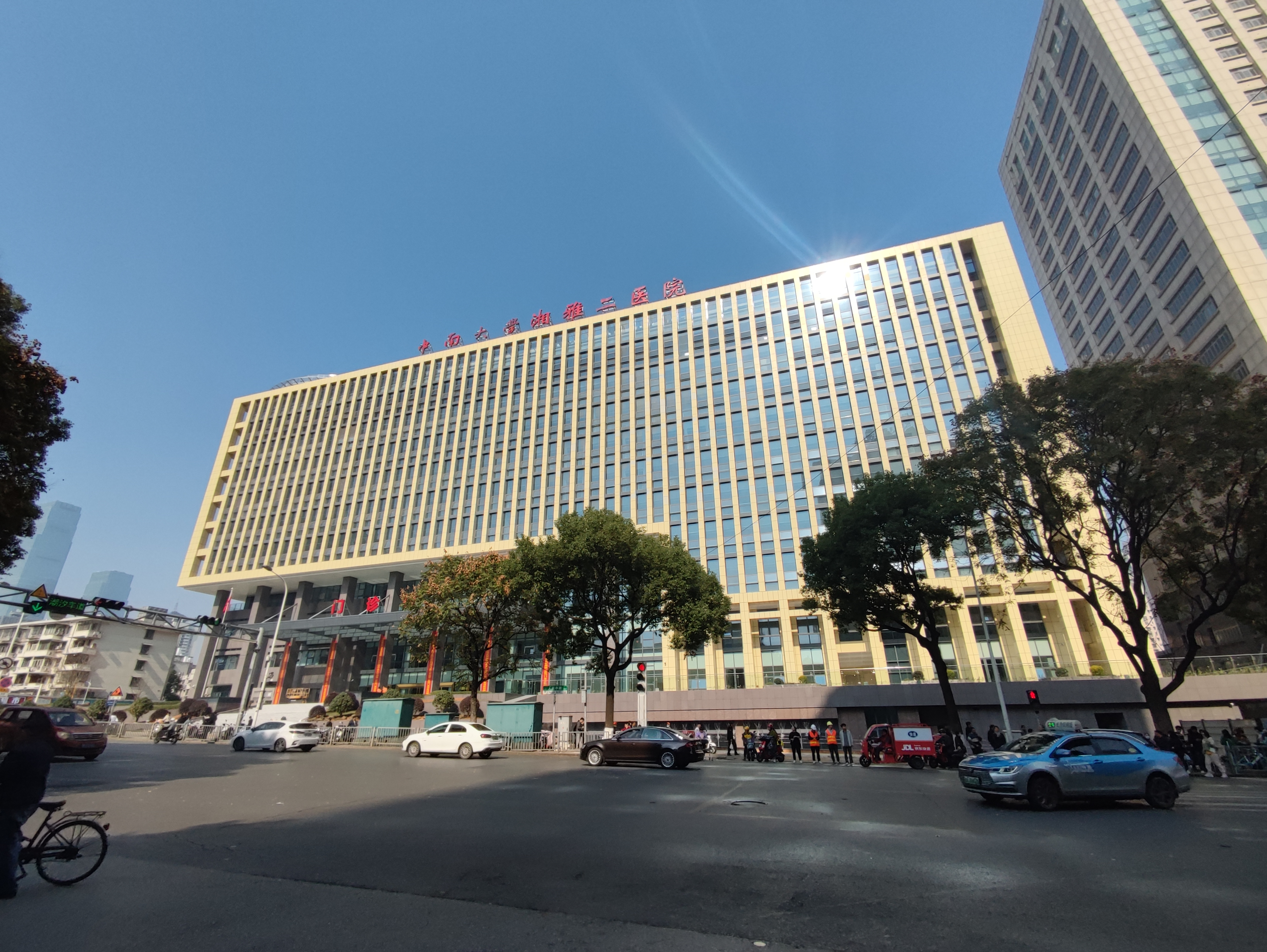

Geography
- Location: Add: No 139, Renmin Middle Road, Changsha, Hunan
- Coordinates: 28.19093°N 112.98856°E

Organisation
- Care system: Public
- Type: Teaching hospital
- Affiliated university: Central South University, National Health Commission

Services
- Standards: 3A
- Emergency department: Yes
- Beds: 3,500

History
- Opened: 1958

Links
- Website: www.xyeyy.com

The Second Xiangya Hospital of Central South University (中南大学湘雅二医院) is a public hospital affiliated with the Xiangya School of Medicine at Central South University, located in Changsha city, Hunan province, China. Founded in 1958, it is a hospital under the budgetary management of the National Health Commission.

== History ==
In 1958, the Second Xiangya Hospital was founded as a spin-off of the Xiangya Hospital, one of the earliest western hospitals in China.

In 1987, it was renamed the "Second Affiliated Hospital of Hunan Medical University".

In 2000, the Medical University was merged into the newly-established Central South University, and the hospital was renamed the "Second Xiangya Hospital of Central South University", or "Second Xiangya Hospital" in short.

== Current situation ==
The Second Xiangya Hospital covers an area of more than 260 mu (land), with a business area of 399,000 square meters.

There are 23 national key clinical specialties, including psychiatry, metabolic endocrinology, cardiovascular surgery, dermatology and venereology, geriatrics, nephrology, clinical pharmacy, and organ transplantation.

The hospital has 3,500 open beds. Annually, the peak outpatient and emergency patient visit volume reached 3.744 million, 166,000 patients were discharged, and 108,000 surgeries of various kinds were performed.

The hospital undertakes the teaching task of more than 2,000 students at undergraduate and postgraduate levels. There are 6 national key disciplines, 40 doctoral programs, and a National Clinical Teaching and Training Demonstration Center.

The hospital has two national clinical medicine research centers and 28 provincial and ministerial scientific research platforms. The staff have also published a number of quality papers on prestigious academic journals.

== Honors ==
The hospital has won many honorary titles, including the National Top 100 Hospitals, the National May 1st Labor Certificate, the National Advanced Collective of the Health System, National Model Hospital for Quality Services, and National Satisfying Medical and Health Institution.

== Ranking ==
The Second Xiangya Hospital has been a top-20 hospital for years in the Chinese Hospital Rankings released by the Hospital Management Institute of Fudan University.

In 2022, the hospital ranked second for the Total Impact of SCI Papers in Nursing globally.

== Event ==
In mid-August 2022, an online post accused Liu Xiangfeng, an associate chief physician of the Second Xiangya Hospital, of serious over-medicalization and other problems. Liu Xiangfeng was accused of deliberately removing the patient's normal intestine when he found that the patient did not have intestinal obstruction. Liu often borrowed blood from other departments such as obstetrics and gynecology, smeared it on his own body, and deceived the family members that the patient was bleeding heavily and needed additional hemostatic drugs. For patients who only needed a biopsy and did not have cancer, Liu Xiangfeng directly removed the pancreas and spleen. On August 16, Xiangya Second Hospital set up an investigation team and suspended Liu Xiangfeng from work for investigation. On the 18th, the hospital announced that the preliminary investigation found that he had engaged in irregular behavior and removed Liu Xiangfeng from his position. On the 25th, the Changsha Municipal Supervision Committee stated that Liu Xiangfeng was suspected of serious violations of law and had intervened in the investigation. On August 25, Liu Xiangfeng was investigated for suspected serious violations of law and was sentenced to 17 years in prison on October 31, 2024.

== Contact information ==
The Second Xiangya Hospital can be contacted via:

Tel: 0731-85295888 or 0731-85295999

Add: No 139, Renmin Middle Road, Changsha, Hunan

== See also ==
- Xiangya Hospital
- Xiangya School of Medicine
- Central South University
- List of hospitals in China
