= Zhiwu Chen =

- 陈志武
- Born: July 1962 (age 64); Zhuzhou, Hunan, China
- Education: Central South University; Changsha Institute of Technology; Yale University
- Occupations: Financial analyst, professor

Zhiwu Chen (Chinese: 陈志武; born July 1962) is a professor of finance at The University of Hong Kong, specializing in finance theory, securities valuation, and the economy of China. He is a public intellectual in China, with a Sina Weibo following of over 9 million; in 2010 The Time Weekly named him one of "Ten Public Intellectuals Influencing China" and in 2012 public relations agency Burson-Marsteller named him one of China's ten most influential political voices on Weibo.

He graduated from Central South University in 1983 with a B.S. degree. Later he obtained a M.S. in 1986 from the Changsha Institute of Technology and a Ph.D. from Yale University in 1990.

He is an editor of the journal Annals of Economics and Finance and the Journal of Financial and Quantitative Analysis, among others. He has served on the executive boards of various companies including the Bank of Communications, PetroChina, Lord Abbett China, the Yale-China Association, and the Unirule Institute of Economics; he was also on China State Council's Advisory Panel on the Formation of the China Investment Corporation. He was Chief Academic Advisor to China Central Television for two documentary series, "Wall Street" and "Money." In 2011 he was appointed the Chief Advisor of the Permal Group, an alternative asset management firm.
