= Yan Fuqing =

Chinese medical practitioner, public health pioneer, civil servant and educator

- 顏福慶
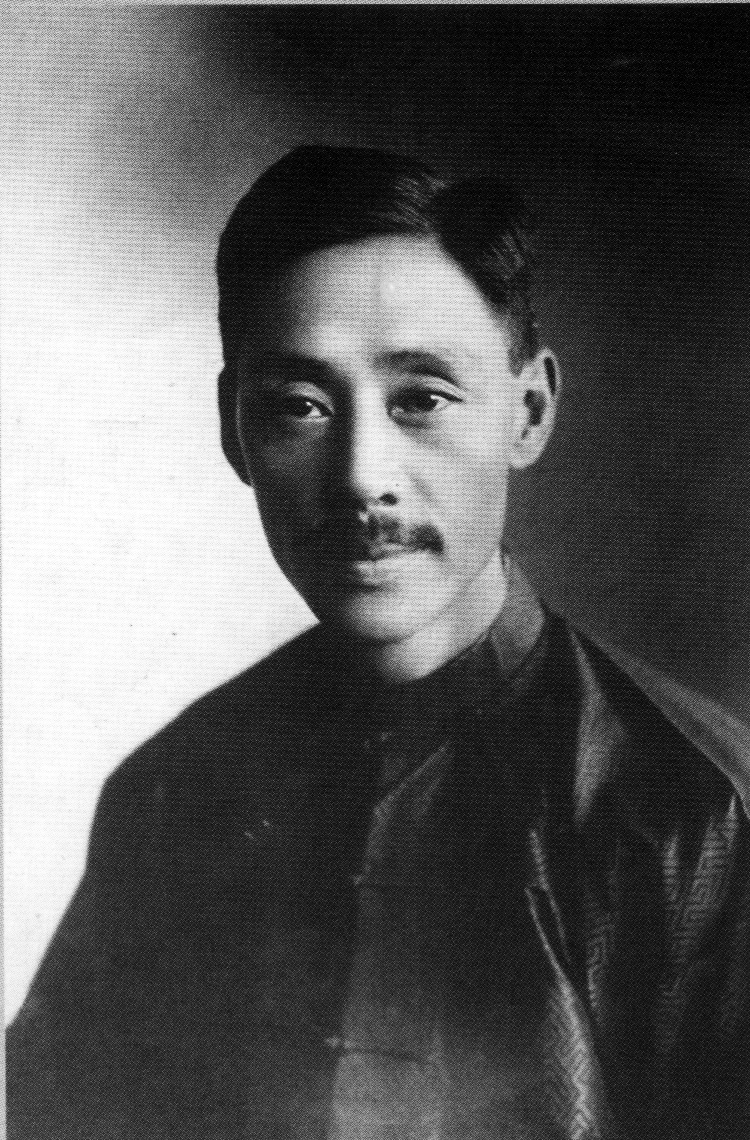
- Born: July 1882; Shanghai
- Died: November 29, 1970 (aged 88); Guangzhou, China
- Other name: Fu Ching Yen
- Occupation: Medical practitioner
- Children: 6

Yan Fuqing (simplified Chinese: 颜福庆; traditional Chinese: 顏福慶; pinyin: Yán Fúqìng; 1882–1970), also known as Fu Ching (F.C.) Yen, was a Chinese medical practitioner, public health pioneer, civil servant, and educator.

Born in Shanghai in 1882, Yen came from a renowned family with a history of serving the Chinese government and society. Notable relatives include cousin Chinese Premier Yan Huiqing, in-law Liu Hongsheng, and the Soong sisters.

A graduate of St. John's College and Yale Medical School, Yen later returned to China and pioneered several public health initiatives, including the establishment of a local Red Cross, overseeing the Hunan-Yale Agreement, the foundation of the National Medical Association of China as well as the National Shanghai Medical College, now the Medical College at Fudan University.

Yen actively treated patients during the Japanese occupation of China in World War II, and subsequently during the Cultural Revolution. Due to his historical, social status, practice of Christianity, and Western ties, he was barred from joining the Chinese Communist Party (CCP). By 1966, his home, property, and social standing had been destroyed for political reasons. Yen died under house arrest in 1970. After his death, he has been celebrated as a patriot and hero by the Chinese government.

== Early life and education ==
The second of five children, Yen Fuqing was born in July 1882. His father, Yen Rusong, was a pastor who raised their family as practicing Episcopalians. Yen and his siblings were noted for being Western-educated. Both his father and his uncle, Yen Yongjing, had volunteered to fight for the Union North in the American Civil War while attending college at Kenyon in Ohio.

During his childhood, Yen Fuqing's father died, leaving his uncle, Yen Yongjing, to take care of him at the age of seven. Due to his father's death and his mother's sickness, Fuqing became interested in medicine at a young age. He grew up in a relatively cosmopolitan environment, heavily influenced by Western and Christian morality and thought. Uncle Yan Yongjing was founder and a principal educator at St. John's University in Shanghai, and Yen Fuqing was given an Anglican education there. After graduating from St. John's University's School of Medicine in 1903, Yen briefly went to work at St. Luke's Hospital before traveling to South Africa to treat Chinese miners working in the then-British colony.

== Time in South Africa ==
After the Anglo-Boer War in South Africa, the British government sought to address the issue of a labor shortage and subsequent low production in Witwatersrand gold mines with workers imported from China. Between the years of 1904-1910, over 60,000 Chinese contracted miners were sent to work in the mines.

In recruiting a labor force, the Chinese government contacted Chinese doctors to accompany the miners. Yen was recruited for meeting the unusual requirements of both the English language and Western medical education. He enrolled after passing an examination by a medical panel in Tianjin.

Upon arrival in South Africa, Yen was appalled by the dangerous and unsanitary conditions to which the laborers were subjected. He found his own clinical skills to be inadequate, and after practicing in South Africa for one year, Yen went on to the United States to further his medical studies. Before leaving, the miners he had treated, presented Yen with a gold badge to show their gratitude for his practice.

== Time at Yale ==
Yen relocated to the United States in 1906 and enrolled in Yale University's medical school at age 24.

At Yale, Yen struggled with the transition to both the rigorous curriculum, the New England winter, and the language barrier. However, by his third year at Yale, he had completed his basic courses and shifted to clinical education. By his fourth year, Yen was engaged in clinical practice and started writing his dissertation, entitled, “A Study of the Cutaneous Method of Von Pirquet and the Percutaneous Method of Moro and a Comparison with Other Tuberculin Tests in Diagnosis of Tuberculosis".

During this time, Yen was also active in the Yale Chinese Students’ Club. It was through the Chinese Students’ Club that he met A.C. Williams, a Yale-China Association Trustee. Williams later suggested that Yen join the Yale-in-China mission in Changsha upon completion of his medical degree.

In June 1909, Yen graduated and became the first Asian to receive a doctorate in medicine at Yale University. That same year, he was elected a member of the American Natural Sciences Association. Upon completion of his studies, Yen made his way to the Liverpool School of Tropical Medicine in Liverpool, England for one semester's advanced study. For his work, Yen earned a certificate of study.

== Return to China ==
Yen returned to Shanghai in the winter of 1910 on a two-year Yale-China Association contract, where he worked with Dr. Edward H. Hume. His presence as a Chinese doctor in the leadership of a Western medical organization inspired confidence and interest among other Chinese medical practitioners. This faith allowed Yen to serve as a bridge for cooperation and outreach between traditional Chinese medicine, culture and Western medicine.

Yen was a prolific administrator and practitioner for the next 18 years of his career. Between 1910 and 1921, he established himself and was elected leader of the Hunan Red Cross. He also launched a public health initiative that ultimately eradicated bubonic plague in areas along the Peking-Hankou Railway, initiated various public hygiene education campaigns, built a Tuberculosis hospital in Changsha, and founded the National Medical Association of China. In 1914, he founded the Xiangya Medical College (now part of the Central South University) in Changsha and served as the first principal. He also obtained a certificate in public health from Harvard around this time. In 1901, Yen attended the China Missionary Medical Association conference, and decided that he and other Chinese doctors would found their own version of this association. This happened in 1915, when he co-founded the Chinese Medical Association with Wu Lunde. The establishment of the group laid the foundation for the widespread practice of Western medicine in China. Already a co-founder, Yen would go on to become the first president of the group.

In 1921, Yen briefly returned to the United States with his wife and eldest daughter Hilda Yen to study Ophthalmology at Harvard Medical School. Despite the fears of his colleague Dr. Hume that he would give up his work in preventive medicine, Yen simply added Ophthalmology to his medical practice. In 1926, Yen also co-founded and became the first Dean of the institution that would ultimately become the Fudan University Medical School. He would go on to spearhead the opening of the Shanghai Medical Center and the establishment of the Hunan-Yale Medical School.

While working at the Hunan-Yale Medical College in 1919, Yen received a Director's approval to grant a free sickbed to a peasant woman who had fallen ill after delivering a baby. As was his propensity for patients who could not afford treatment, Yen granted the request and forgot the incident. Thirty-seven years later, Yen would be reminded of this event when he sat beside Chairman Mao Zedong at a dinner held for intellectuals in Shanghai, where Mao recounted that the peasant woman had been Mao's wife, Yang Kaihui.

During this time Yen developed several public health outreach and education programs tackling specific diseases. Yen's efforts, which included a hygiene program to address cases of snail fever in the Tongting Lake area, and the construction of an advanced sanitation system and public education campaign to address hookworm infestations among coal miners, ultimately laid the foundation for standardizing industrial sanitation rules in China.

The 1920s were a time of burgeoning instability in China. The social and political atmosphere that emerged around the time of the May Fourth Movement in 1919 largely shaped China's tumultuous twentieth century. The anti-imperialist, anti-western, and nationalist student-driven movements and the Northern Expedition led by the Kuomintang had a strong impact on the environment in which foreign-educated professionals like Yen could operate. This affected Yen's relationships with foreign colleagues and friends and ultimately the stability of his practices. Under pressure from the Northern Expedition's approach, Yen's longtime colleague Dr. Hume retreated to the US led by an armed escort in 1926. It was at this same time that Yen left the Changsha region.

In 1927, Yen became vice president of Peking Union Medical College (PUMC), the leading medical school in China at the time. Later that year, the Northern Expedition army captured Nanjing and attacked foreign institutions, homes, consulates, churches, and schools. The vice president of Nanking University was shot dead in his home by looters, and five dormitories were set on fire. Despite the danger inherent to both academics and those with foreign ties, Yen led a group from PUMC into Wuhan as part of the Wounded Soldiers Relief Association to treat those who had been injured in the fighting.

In 1928, Yen leased the General Hospital of the China Red Cross Society from the organization. He then became its first director, providing a convenient and willing institution for clinical medical education.

In 1929, shortly before departing to participate in the Pan-Pacific Surgery Conference in Honolulu, Yen drew up plans for establishing the Sun Yat-sen Memorial Hospital. He later submitted the plan for what would become the Shanghai Medical Center the following year.

By January 1931, significant funding had been secured from sources such as fellow Yale alumnus, Central Bank President H. H. Kung, Sun Yat-Sen, Chiang Kai-Shek, and the Soong sisters, and the project was officially initiated. The hospital's mission was to focus on public health and disease prevention, both considered major gaps in healthcare in the city of Shanghai at that time.

== Second Sino-Japanese War and Chinese Communist Revolution ==
In the summer of 1937, as the Shanghai Medical College expanded its staff, student body, and scope of education and medical practice, the Japanese invaded China. Soon after the Marco Polo Bridge Incident, Shanghai was quickly militarized and the Battle of Shanghai was launched. During this time, Yen was appointed Chairman of a medical response coalition to treat wounded soldiers.

During their assault on the city, the Japanese attacked civilians and medical personnel alike. On August 23, Japanese soldiers attacked one of several medical auxiliary groups and shot five doctors and nurses on their knees at point blank range. When Shanghai officially fell to the Japanese in early November 1937, Yen and the staff of the Sun Yatsen Hospital rushed to evacuate the staff, patients, and equipment of the hospital. Yen and his teams retreated inland to Chongqing with other Chinese civilians and government officials. At this time, he was appointed the Minister of Public Health.

Thousands of other Chinese citizens flooded into the region at the same time. Many focused on similar infrastructure and other mobilization efforts, both with respect to both domestic improvement and wartime support. As both a doctor and in his capacity as Public Health Minister, Yen was concerned with the high rates of disease and dismal living conditions of many citizens, particularly laborers. To address this issue, Yen worked with the central government to set up 72 medical rescue stations along regional highways as part of an emergency medical network. After the Japanese war and occupation, these were subsequently converted to full hospitals and served as foundations for the area's public medical infrastructure.

As the fighting continued, the Yen family became increasingly involved. Yen's daughter Hilda Yen partnered with fellow aviator Li Xiaqing to fly for fundraising events in the United States. Yen recalled his eldest son William (Woqing) from college in the United States to assist in the war effort. Yen's wife Cao Xiuying, as a leader of the Shanghai Anti-Japanese Women's Federation, set up an orphanage for wartime orphans. Her organization also mobilized women in Shanghai to sew uniforms and shoes for soldiers.

In 1940, Yen resigned from his post as Public Health Minister and traveled to the United States for surgery for a stomach ulcer. On his way back to China via Hong Kong, he was intercepted by Japanese police and placed under surveillance. By 1942, Yen was allowed to return to Shanghai. He began to teach at Shanghai Medical College, one of the few institutions in the city that remained under non-Japanese control. Although the College was later forced to register with the Japanese occupation government, the administration did so on the condition that no leadership from the Nanjing government be sent to take control. Partially due to this, the Nanjing government would constantly harangue Yen and other senior colleagues with bribes and offers to take roles in the occupational government. Yen refused.

In March 1943, Yen's wife Cao Xiuying died suddenly of a stroke at age 62. Yen's first grandson, Yen Zhiyuan, was born in February 1945.

In August 1945, the Japanese surrendered to the United States, ending World War II. By this time, the CCP had grown in both power and membership. They began to take over China, moving through the countryside toward major cities, mobilizing peasants, and by 1949, Mao Zedong proclaimed the foundation of the People's Republic of China. Against this backdrop of political uncertainty and change, Yen decided to remain in Shanghai, China, continuing his work at Shanghai Medical College and serving as a consultant to the CCP.

== Cultural Revolution ==
Yen was barred from the CCP for his status as a Christian, and instead joined the Jiusan Society - one of 8 legally-sanctioned political parties allowed by the CCP government.

Through the 1950s and 1960s, Yen often held Westernized social events at his home. These included activities like bridge and Western-style social dancing. With the start of the Cultural Revolution in 1966, Yen was condemned for these events. Yen was accused of living a “decadent and bourgeois life”, for crimes just as listening to foreign music, and answering the telephone with in English. Red Guards searched Yen's home and office repeatedly during the Cultural Revolution. They destroyed gramophone records of Western classical music and jazz, as well as his family's personal effects, including a granddaughter's dollhouse.

In the spring of 1966, in anticipation of the Culture Revolution, Yen asked his eldest grandson Zhiyuan to take and distribute Yen's savings among family members. Zhiyuan was also asked to destroy several potentially politically-sensitive personal effects, including a photograph of Yen's daughter Hilda with her airplane, which included an American flag in the backdrop.

In June 1966, began a campaign of character assassination against Yen. This included both mental and physical torture by the government and its agents. At eighty-four years old, Yen was condemned as a US spy, an active counter-revolutionary, and several other fabricated charges. In August, Yen was made to wear a sign around his neck that read “I am a bastard” and paraded through the streets of Shanghai. Yen's grandchildren were often made to walk through the streets with Yen during these public humiliations, where rioters would hit and spit on them. In later searches of Yen's home, the Red Guards gradually removed gold, jewelry, US dollars, deeds to property, a refrigerator, a motorcycle, several bicycles, trunks of clothing and textiles and more. After much of the family's property had been stolen, the Red Guards would come into the homes and carve their names or CCP slogans into walls and cabinets.

In 1966, Yen was placed under house arrest. A CCP propaganda team was stationed in the family home, where they would often curse, yell CCP slogans, threaten, and condemn Yen, as his family remained powerless to help him. Yen remained staunch in his conviction that he had done nothing wrong and his resolve not to commit suicide, as was a common reaction to such treatment. Despite his commitment, Yen's health failed under these conditions.

== Death ==
After suffering a sudden pulmonary episode at home, Yen was rushed to the Sun Yatsen Hospital, where he was refused treatment for political reasons. When his son Victor, also a physician, requested the use of an oxygen cylinder for treatment at home, he was also refused. Yen was able to receive medication and oxygen through a series of illegal channels, including Dr. Li Huade at Sun Yatsen hospital.

Yen spent his final days living with his youngest son Victor, his wife Mary, and their 5 children. On November 29, 1970, after years of illness, harassment, and house arrest, Yen died at home at the age of 88.

== Legacy ==
Despite his treatment by the government at the end of his life, Yen has since been lauded by the CCP as a national hero. His contributions to the foundation of public and western medicine across China were critical to the tremendous economic and social growth that the country has enjoyed since the 1980s.

In November 1978, a state-organized ceremony was held on the anniversary of Yen's death, during which state leaders and celebrities gathered to honor Yen's public service and accomplishments.

In 1997, a statue of Dr. Yen was erected on the Medical School's Eastern campus to celebrate the 70th anniversary of Shanghai Medical College. In 2005, in honor of the 100th anniversary of Fudan University, the road in front of Yen's statue was renamed “Fuqing Road.”

== Personal life ==
Yen was married to Cao Xiuying, a relative of Sun Yat-sen.

After her marriage to Yen, Cao became a philanthropist and opened several teaching orphanages. Cao and Yen had six children, though only four survived to adulthood. This included Woqīng (Western name William), Yǎqīng (Western name Hilda), Xiangqīng (Western name Dorothy), and Ruiqīng (Western name Victor). Cao was renowned for her generosity. In one story, she was said to have lent a Steinway piano to an impoverished fellow parishioner in the 1930s in order to help the woman provide for her two young daughters. After ultimately having the means to raise their daughters, the family returned Cao's piano to her family after her death in 1966, just before the outbreak of the Cultural Revolution.

During his time at Yale Medical School, Yen became close friends with the only other two foreign students, Jacque Louis Buttner, from France, and Carl Johannes Grade, from Denmark. When Yen returned to the United States for the treatment of a gastric ulcer in the 1950s, it was Buttner who acted as his surgeon at New Haven Hospital.

Yen had eight grandchildren. During the three years of Great Chinese Famine, Yen's rations were provided by the government for his position as a “senior intellectual”. He consistently distributed these to his grandchildren, concerned that they would not grow without adequate nutrition.

Yen Zuiyuan, F.C. Yen's eldest grandson, is currently an associate professor at Fudan University. In 2007, Zuiyuan wrote and published a comprehensive biography of his grandfather's life. The book was released by Fudan University Press and has been translated into English.

In 1921, when Yen took a two-year sabbatical from his roles at the Yale-China Association and Hunan Medical College, his daughter Hilda was granted entry into Smith College in Northampton, Massachusetts. Eighty-nine years later, Dr. Yen's great-granddaughter would go on to graduate from Smith College. Ninety-three years after Hilda's admission to Smith College, another great-granddaughter would also graduate from Smith College. Dr. Yen's great-grandson Ronald Chen, Hilda Yen's grandson through her first marriage to P.T. Chen, is dean of Rutgers Law School.
