= Ren Zhuoxuan =

Chinese Communist defector

- 任卓宣
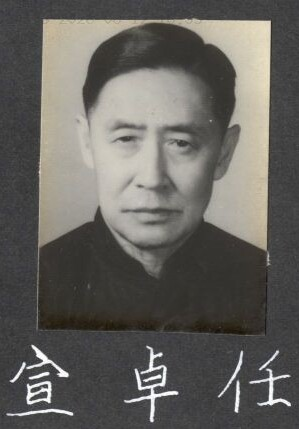
- Born: April 4, 1896; Nanchong, Sichuan, Qing dynasty
- Died: January 29, 1990 (aged 93); Taiwan
- Other name: Ye Qing (葉青)
- Known for: Writing on the Three Principles of the People, Surviving his execution despite being shot twice, Coining the term "Mao Zedong-ism".
- Political party: Chinese Communist Party (1923–1928); Kuomintang (1939–)
- Spouse: Wei Suqiu (尉素秋)

Ren Zhuoxuan, (Chinese: 任卓宣; pinyin: Rén Zhuóxuān; 4 April 1896 – 29 January 1990), widely known by his pen name Ye Qing (Chinese: 葉青; pinyin: Yè Qīng), was a Chinese political theorist and prolific writer. He was an early member of the Chinese Communist Party. After two arrests and a failed execution, he left the CCP and joined the Kuomintang.

He subsequently reinvented himself as one of the KMT's anti-communist theorists, publishing on the Three Principles of the People. Through his critiques of CCP leadership, he coined the term "Mao Zedong-ism" (毛澤東主義), later CCP theorists would develop the rival formulation "Mao Zedong Thought" (毛澤東思想), which was formalized at the Seventh National Congress of the Chinese Communist Party in 1945.

He fled to Taiwan in 1950, where he continued writing and lecturing until his death.

== Early life ==
Ren Zhuoxuan was born on 4 April 1896 in Nanchong, Sichuan province to a modest family. He studied at the Nanzhong County Middle School (南充縣立中學), then worked as a primary school teacher and became influenced by Liang Qichao and La Jeunesse. In 1919 Ren entered the Peking Higher French Language School (北京高等法文專修館) to prepare for studies abroad in France.

In 1920 Ren traveled to France as part of the Diligent Work–Frugal Study Movement. He worked as an apprentice at a steel mill near Lyon, and later as a factory hand near Paris. Exposure to both capitalism and socialist thought in France shifted his outlook from industrial-led reform toward socialism.

== Political Activities ==
=== Overseas ===
In France, Ren joined the French Communist Party and co-founded a "European branch" of the Communist Youth League of China, subsequently joining the Chinese Communist Party Together with Zhou Enlai and others in France at the time, he contributed to party magazine Chiguang (赤光, "Red Light").

Following the May 30th Movement, he led a group of Chinese nationals to storm the Chinese embassy, he was then arrested along with more than twenty others and imprisoned for four months. He was then expelled from France.

Ren then traveled to the Soviet Union via Berlin, studying briefly at the Communist University of the Toilers of the East before enrolling at Sun Yat-sen University. In the winter of 1925, Wang Ming and others arrived at the university and a factional dispute erupted between what became known as the "academic faction" (教务派) and the "party-affairs faction" (党务派), leading to a lasting animosity between the two.

=== China ===
After returning to China Ren served as propaganda director for the CCP in Guangdong and concurrently as a political instructor at Whampoa Military Academy.

During a crackdown a CCP members that preceded the White Terror, Ren was arrested after an informant betrayed the party organisation, he was sentenced to death.

On the day set for the execution, Ren was the seventh of ten prisoners brought for execution by firing squad. After the volley of shots, he fell to the ground alive, as a bullet had passed through his torso without striking vital organs. A guard noticed he was still alive and fired an additional shot, which struck him in one eye but still did not kill him. After the executioners departed, a peasant who was looting the bodies found Ren still conscious. The peasant helped him to a farmhouse and alerted his cousin, who brought him to the Yale-affiliated Xiangya Hospital, where he recovered.

He was then later arrested a second time while still hospitalised because, without his knowledge, the CCP had been using his home address as a communications hub. After this incident, he left the party. Upon hearing he had defected, Chen Duxiu reportedly said: "Zhuoxuan could never do such a thing, do not slander him."

==== Writing ====
Ren moved to Shanghai and there became better known by his pen name Ye Qing. There he served as chief editor for a left wing library and translated a number of works such as those of Georgi Plekhanov, also publishing his critiques of Hu Shi and Zhang Dongsun. Several CCP members frequenting the library the bookstore were aware of his status as a defector but did not oppose him. Ren explained he had left the party due to them ignoring his advice and the home address issue, and that he would now restrict himself to translating and writing.

In 1933, Zhang Dongsun published an article entitled "Is Dynamic Logic Possible?" in the journal "New China", on dialectical logic. Ren responded with "A Dynamic Logic Is Possible! An Answer to Professor Zhang Dongsun", and in the next year, published a two-volume work titled A Critique of Zhang Dongsun's Philosophy. Between 1935 and 1937, another debate developed between Ye Qing and the Marxist philosopher Ai Siqi, who criticized Ye Qing's moderate stances, publishing his own "Critique of Ye Qing's Philosophy".

=== KMT ===
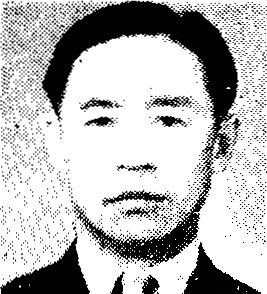
Ren Zhuoxuan ~1946

In 1939, Ren officially joined the Kuomintang and devoted himself to promoting Sun Yat-sen's Three Principles of the People.

In 1941, after reading Mao Zedong's works On Protracted War, On the New Stage, and On New Democracy, Ren published a critical review in the Chongqing journal War and Culture (抗戰與文化, in which he coined the term "Mao Zedong-ism" (毛澤東主義). He characterised "Mao Zedong-ism" as essentially a revival of Hong Xiuquan's Taiping Heavenly Kingdom.

The term prompted a response from CCP theorists. On 18 February 1942, Zhang Ruxin (張如心) published a rebuttal entitled "Learning and Grasping Comrade Mao Zedong's Theory and Strategy", which positively reframed the term. Wang Jiaxiang and others proposed a variant formulation as "Mao Zedong Thought" (毛澤東思想), which supplanted "Mao Zedong-ism" as the CCP's preferred term. Liu Shaoqi mentionned "Mao Zedong Thought" at the Seventh Party Congress, cementing its usage.

During World War II, Ren was invited by the Jiangxi provincial governor Xiong Shihui to help "guide the Three Principles of the People cultural movement", later being summoned by Chiang Kai-shek, to the KMT's wartime capital Chongqing to produce Three Principles-related propaganda.

In January 1949, the CCP published its lists of purported war criminals. Ren Zhuoxuan appeared in the second list next to Hu Shi and Cardinal Yu Bin on the list. In 1949, Chiang Kai-shek received Ren in Fenghua and asked for his assessment of the KMT's recent defeats. Ren surmised that the KMT had implemented the Three Principles insufficiently and too slowly.

== Taiwan ==
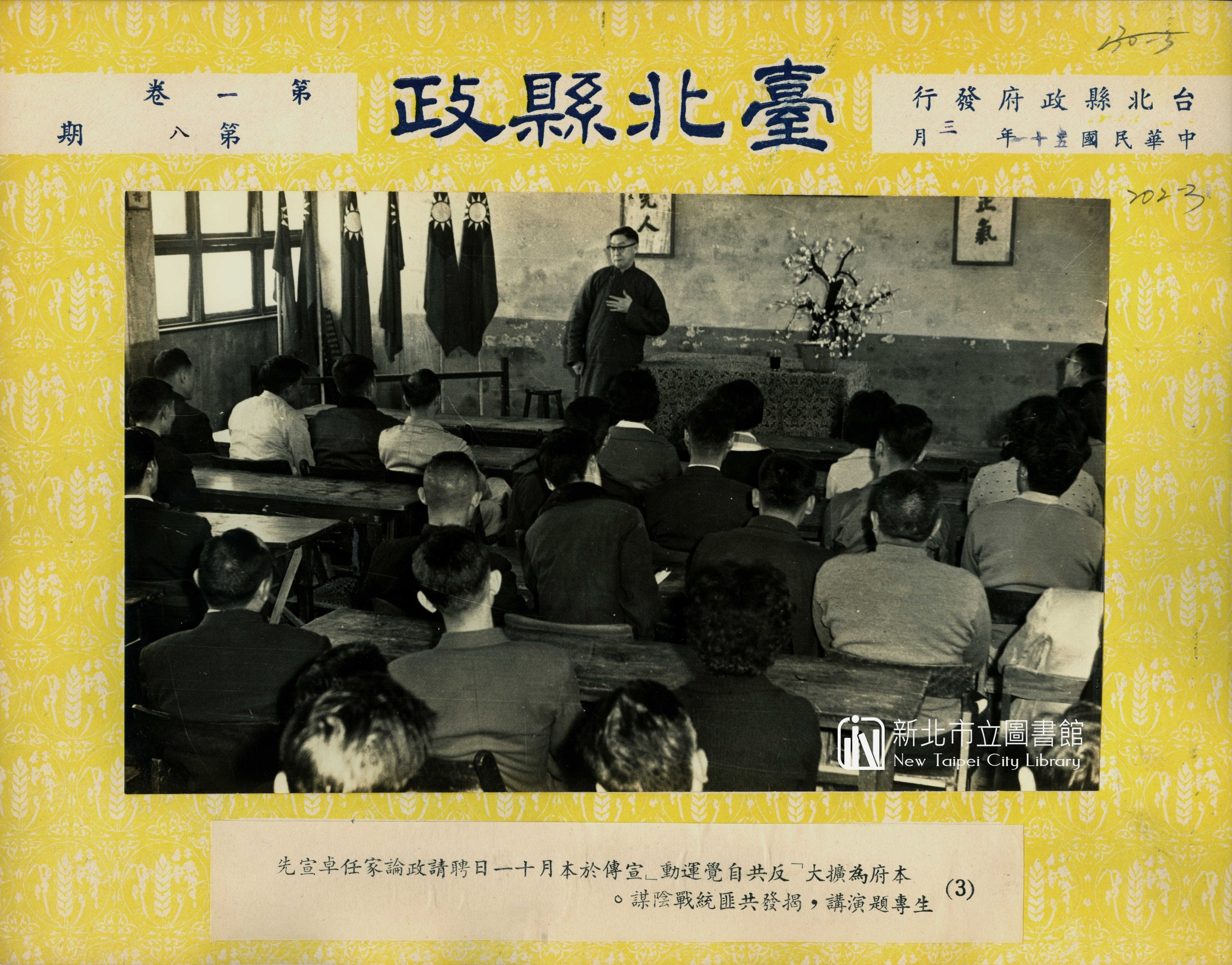
Ren Zhuoxuan giving a lecture in Taipei, 1961

In 1950, Ren arrived in Taiwan with other KMT members. He resigned from position in the party and taught at the National Chengchi University in Taipei.

Ye Qing continued writing as an energetic polemicist in Taiwan. in 1965, a celebration in of his 70th birthday in 1965 was attended by more than 3,000 guests including many prominent ROC figures. A poem written by Wan Yaohuang, said of his career: "His name became known through Ye Qing; his writing multiplied through anti-communism" (名以葉青顯，文因反共多). He received the Order of the Cloud and Banner from the ROC.

== Personal life ==
Ran was married, his wife was Wei Suqiu (尉素秋), a graduate of the Chinese literature and history department of National Central University in Nanjing. Wei was the maternal aunt of the literary critic Wei Tiancong.

He died on 29 January 1990 in Taiwan at age 93.

== Selected works ==
- Critique of Hu Shi (胡適批判), c. 1932
- Critique of Zhang Dongsun's Philosophy (張東蓀哲學批判), 1934
- How to Study the Three Principles of the People (怎樣研究三民主義)
- The Perfection of the Three Principles of the People (三民主義之完美)
- The Three Principles of the People and Socialism (三民主義與社會主義)
- Problems of Logic (論理學問題), 1937

== See also ==
- Wang Ming
- Gu Shunzhang
