= Li Jiancheng (geodesist) =

Chinese engineer (born 1964)

- 李建成

President of Central South University
- Incumbent
- Assumed office 14 September 2022
- Preceded by: Tian Hongqi

Personal details
- Born: December 1964 (age 61) Ulanqab, Inner Mongolia, China
- Party: Chinese Communist Party
- Education: Wuhan University
- Scientific career
- Fields: Geodesy
- Workplaces: Wuhan University
- Doctoral advisor: Ning Jinsheng

Li Jiancheng (Chinese: 李建成; pinyin: Lǐ Jiànchéng; born December 1964) is a Chinese engineer who is a professor and vice-president of Wuhan University. He is an academician of the Chinese Academy of Engineering. He is a member of the Chinese Communist Party.

== Biography ==
Li was born in Ulanqab, Inner Mongolia, in December 1964. He earned a bachelor's degree in 1987, a master's degree in 1990, and a doctor's degree in 1993, all from Wuhan University of Surveying and Mapping Technology (now School of Geodesy and Geomatics, Wuhan University). After graduation, he taught at the university, where he was appointed vice-president in January 2015. In November 2011, at the age of 46, he was elected an academician of the Chinese Academy of Engineering, becoming the youngest academician in that year. In September 2022, he succeeded Tian Hongqi as president of Central South University.

== Honors and awards ==
- November 2011 Member of the Chinese Academy of Engineering (CAE)
- October 21, 2016 Science and Technology Progress Award of the Ho Leung Ho Lee Foundation
- January 10, 2020 State Science and Technology Progress Award (First Class)

Educational offices
Preceded by Tian Hongqi	President of Central South University; 2022–present	Incumbent
