= Zhang Xiaoqian =

Chinese physician

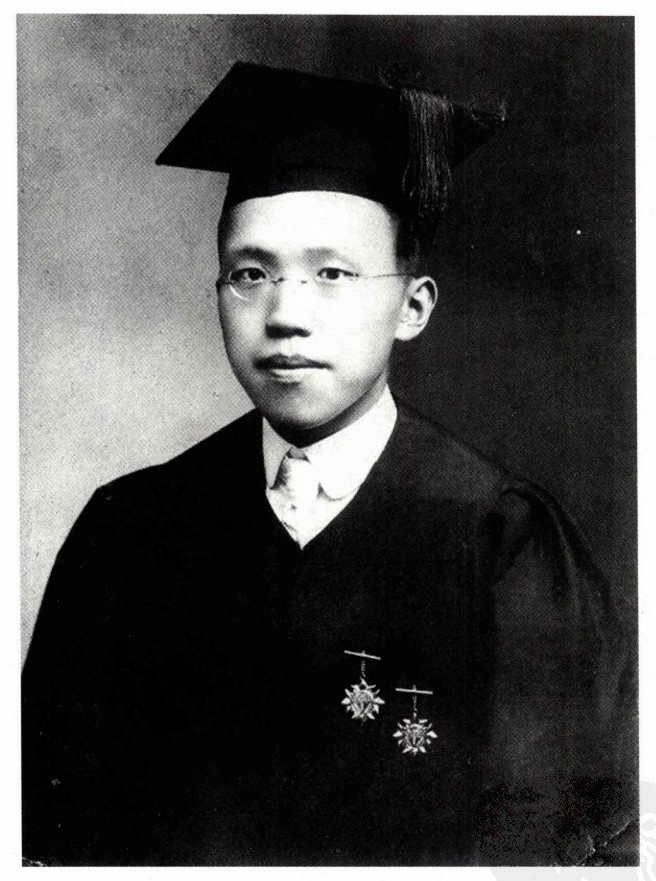
- Zhang in 1921
- Born: December 28, 1897; Changsha, Hunan, China
- Died: August 8, 1987 (aged 89); Beijing, China
- Education: Hsiang-Ya Medical College
- Known for: Founder of gastroenterology in China
- Children: 4, including Zhang Youshang
- Scientific career
- Fields: Gastroenterology
- Workplaces: Hsiang-Ya Medical College; Peking Union Medical College

Chinese name
- Traditional Chinese: 張孝騫
- Simplified Chinese: 张孝骞
Transcriptions
Standard Mandarin
- Hanyu Pinyin: Zhāng Xiàoqiān
- Wade–Giles: Chang Hsiao-ch'ien

Zhang Xiaoqian (simplified Chinese: 张孝骞; traditional Chinese: 張孝騫; December 28, 1897 – August 8, 1987), also known as Hsiao-ch'ien Chang, was a Chinese gastroenterologist who is considered the founder of gastroenterology in China. He served as President of Hsiang-Ya Medical College and Vice President of Peking Union Medical College, and was a founding member of both Academia Sinica and the Chinese Academy of Sciences.

== Biography ==
Zhang was born in Changsha, Hunan on December 28, 1897. He graduated from Changjun High School and entered Hsiang-Ya Medical College in 1914, from which he graduated with an M.D. in 1921. He became a chief resident physician at Peking Union Medical College (PUMC) Hospital in 1924. He went to the U.S. for further education at Johns Hopkins University for one year.

Zhang became an Associate in Medicine at PUMC in 1932, and engaged in medical research at Stanford University the next year. He returned to China in 1934. After the Second Sino-Japanese War began in 1937, he left Beijing for his hometown Changsha and was appointed Professor and President of Hsiang-Ya. As the Japanese army approached Changsha, he moved the college to Guiyang in 1938, and then to Chongqing in 1944. His advocacy of changing Hsiang-Ya to a national university, was supported by Minister of Education, Chen Lifu, and approved by the Republic of China government in 1940. He accepted a professorship at PUMC Hospital in 1948.

Zhang was elected a founding academician of Academia Sinica in 1948 and the Chinese Academy of Sciences in 1955. He was appointed Vice President of PUMC in September 1962 and Vice President of the Chinese Academy of Medical Sciences in 1978.

== Persecution ==
During the Hundred Flowers Campaign in 1956, Zhang, together with other senior doctors including Li Zong'en and Li Kehong, openly criticized Communist Party policies at his hospital. When Mao Zedong cracked down on dissent in the ensuing Anti-Rightist Campaign, he spared Zhang, a fellow Hunanese native, from persecution, calling him a "simpleminded person who has been manipulated by others". The two Doctor Lis, on the other hand, were labelled as "rightists" and sent to remote provinces for "reform". They both died soon afterwards in exile. When the Cultural Revolution started in 1966, however, Zhang was not spared persecution and was imprisoned by the Red Guards for nine months.

== Death and legacy ==
Zhang died of lung cancer on 8 August 1987 in Peking Union Medical College Hospital, at the age of 89.

On 20 November 1992, China Post issued a stamp commemorating Zhang as part of the third set of its "Modern Chinese Scientists" stamp series (serial number 1992-19). 61 million copies were printed.

== Family ==
Zhang had four children, all of whom became scientists or physicians. His eldest daughter Zhang Youduan (张友端) is a biochemist with a Ph.D. from the University of Cambridge. His second daughter, a graduate of Hsiang-Ya Medical College, is a radiologist. His son, Zhang Youshang, is a biochemist and academician of the Chinese Academy of Sciences who served as Vice President of the Shanghai Institute of Biochemistry. His youngest son, Zhang Youhui (张友会), is an oncologist and former President of the Cancer Institute of the Chinese Academy of Medical Sciences.
