= Xiangya Hospital of Central South University =

Hospital in Changsha, China

- Central South University
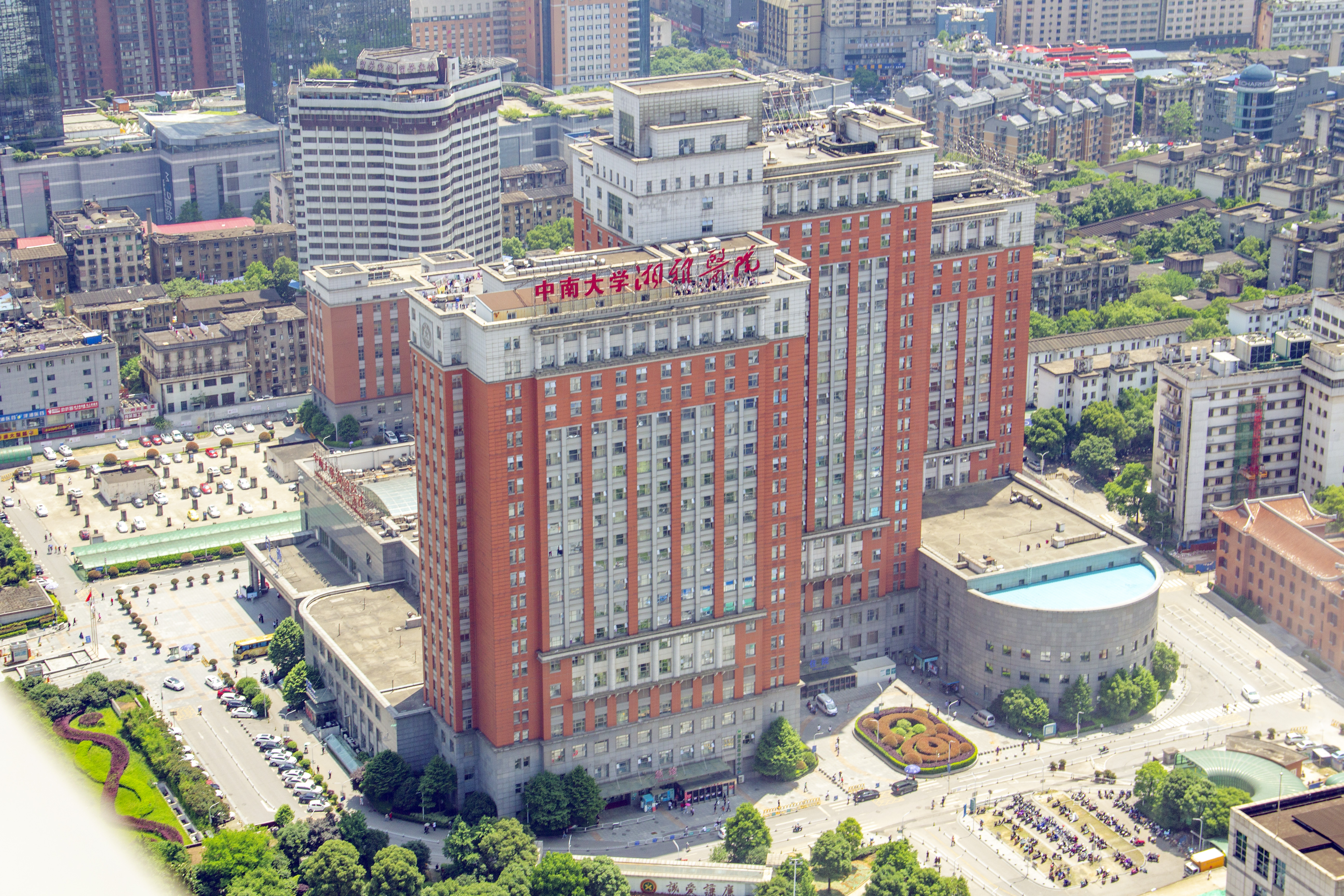

Geography
- Location: No.87, Xiangya Rd, Kaifu District, Changsha, China

Organisation
- Care system: Public
- Type: Teaching, District General
- Affiliated university: Central South University, National Health Commission

Services
- Emergency department: Yes
- Beds: 3,500

History
- Founded: 1906

Links
- Website: xiangya.com.cn/en
- Lists: Hospitals in China

Xiangya Hospital of Central South University
- Simplified Chinese: 湘雅医院
- Traditional Chinese: 湘雅醫院
Transcriptions
Standard Mandarin
- Hanyu Pinyin: Xiāngyǎ Yīyuàn

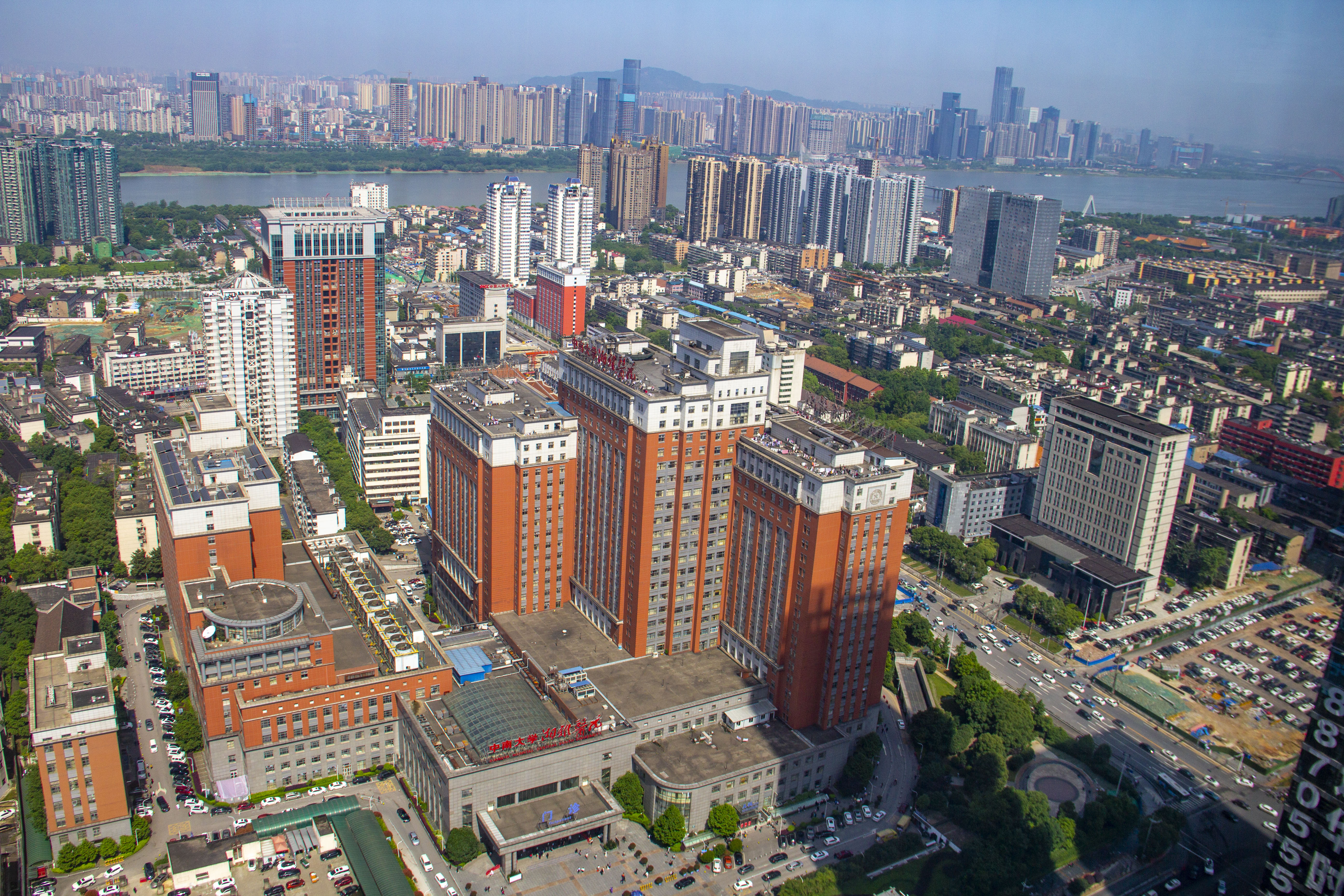
Xiangya Hospital is located to the east of Xiangjiang River, separated from the old campus of Xiangya Medical College by Xiangya Road.

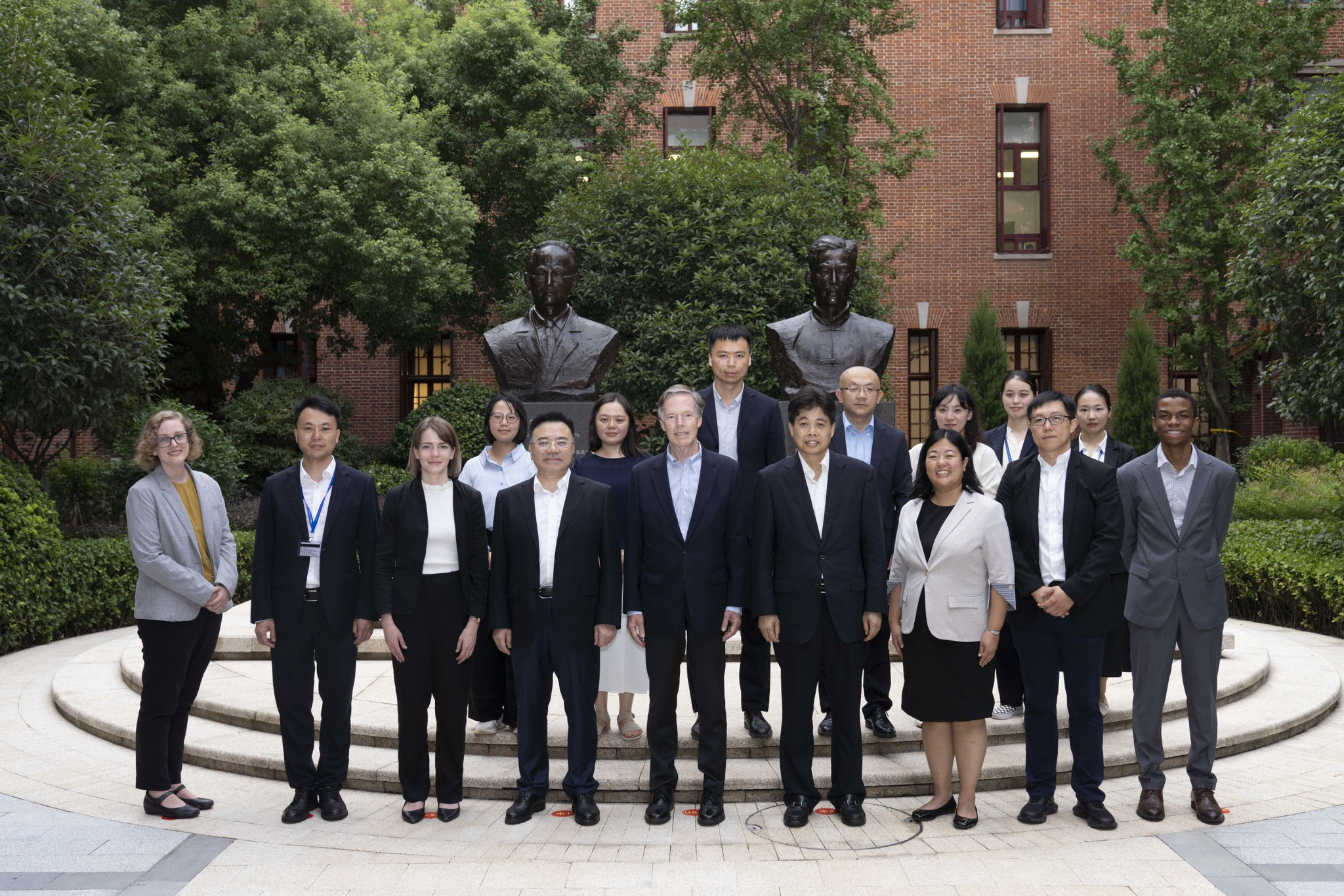
U.S. Ambassador to China Nicholas Burns visits Xiangya Hospital

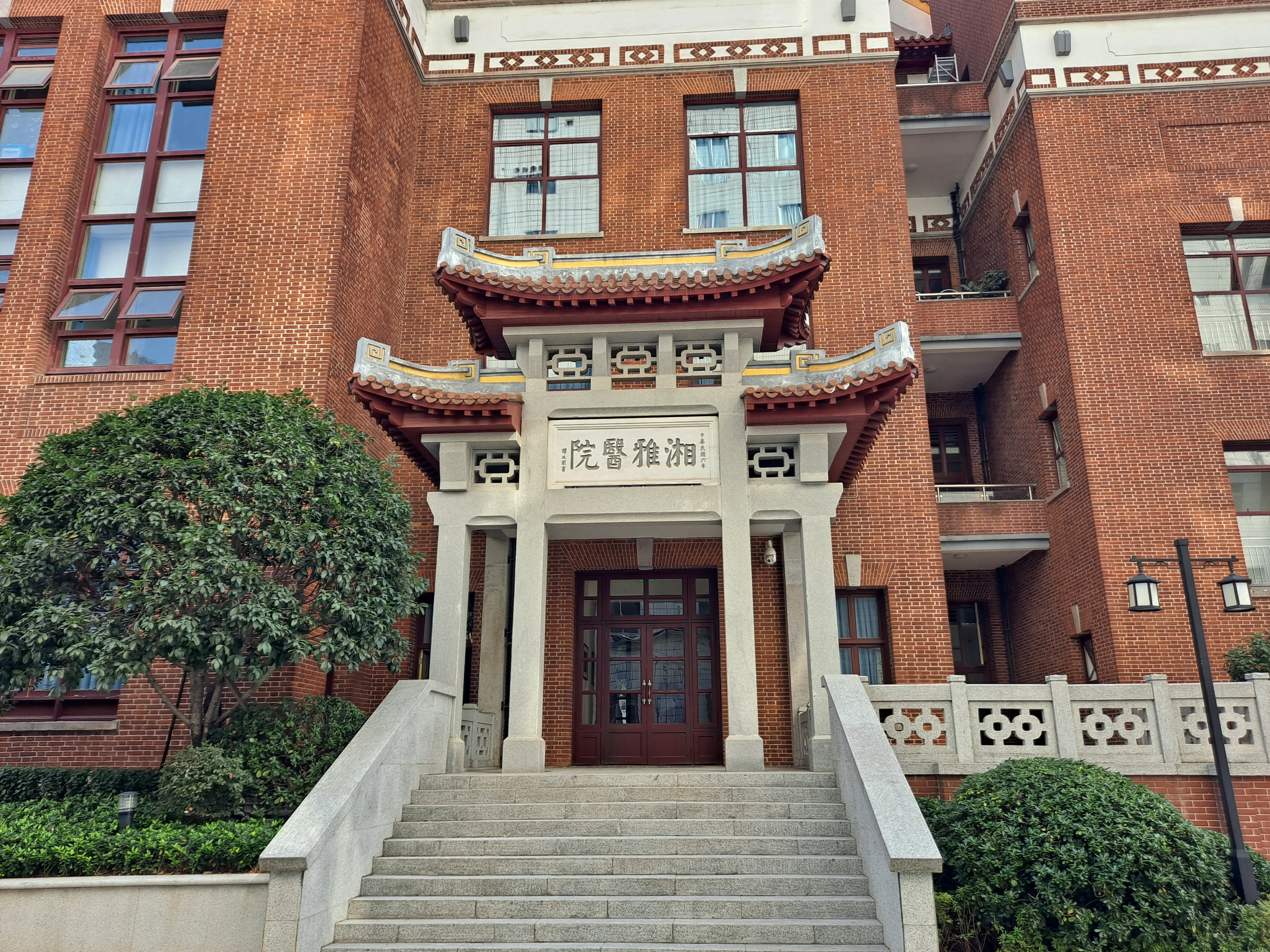
Chinese: “湘雅醫院” (Xiangya Hospital) written by Tan Yankai

The Xiangya Hospital of Central South University (中南大学湘雅医院) is a public hospital affiliated with the Xiangya School of Medicine at Central South University, located in Changsha city, Hunan province, China. Founded in 1906, it is a hospital under the budgetary management of the National Health Commission.

== History ==
In 1906, Edward H. Hume, a young physician from the US Yale-China Association, founded Yali Hospital in Changsha. It was one of the earliest Western hospitals in China.

In 1910, Yan Fuqing, the first Chinese graduating from the Yale School of Medicine, returned to Changsha and started to work with Hume.

In 1914, the Xiangya Medical College was co-founded by the Hunan Yuqun Association and the Yale-China Association. In the next year, Yali Hospital and Xiangya Medical College was merged to form Xiangya Hospital located outside Changsha's North Gate.

In 1922, Xiangya Hospital and Peking Union Medical College were honoured as the two best medical institutions in China. Hence, the saying “In the South Xiangya, in the North Union.”

During the Second Sino-Japanese War, medical workers from Xiangya Hospital treated thousands of casualties and refugees. In 1938 the hospital moved to Yuanling in western Hunan, to Chongqing, and to Guiyang, Guizhou Province.

In 1945, the hospital returned to Changsha, only to find the campus and facilities badly damaged. With the efforts of its faculty and staff, Xiangya was soon resumed for normal operation.

In early 1950s, the link between Xiangya and the Yale-China Association was cut when the Korean War broke out.

In 1979, the partnership between Xiangya and Yale were resumed with the re-establishment of Sino-American diplomatic ties.

In 2000, Xiangya Hospital were merged into Central South University.

=== Changes of name ===
In its history of over 100 years, Xiangya has got its name changed quite a few times:

- Yali Hospital (October 1906 - January 1915)
- Hsiang-Ya Hospital (February 1915 - November 1951)
- Xiangya Hospital Affiliated to Xiangya Medical College (December 1951 - September 1953)
- Xiangya Hospital Affiliated to Hunan Medical College (October 1953 - September 1958)
- The First Affiliated Hospital of Hunan Medical College (October 1958 - December 1987)
- The First Affiliated Hospital of Hunan Medical University (January 1988 - April 1992)
- Xiangya Hospital Affiliated to Hunan Medical University (May 1992 - April 2000)
- Xiangya Hospital of Central South University (April 2000 -)

== Present situation ==
Xiangya has developed into a comprehensive Grade A tertiary hospital with 3,500 beds registered. There are 111 clinical and medical technology departments, 77 inpatient wards and 102 nursing units. In 2021, it received 3.473 million outpatients and emergency visits, discharged 160,000 inpatients, and performed 102,000 operations.

== See also ==
- Xiangya School of Medicine
- Central South University
- List of hospitals in China
