= Yali High School =

- 长沙市雅礼中学

Location
- 428 Laodong Western Road, Yuhua District, Changsha, Hunan, 410007; China; 28°10′19″N 112°59′07″E

Information
- Type: Comprehensive Public High School
- Motto: Chinese: 公·勤·诚·朴 (Justice, Diligentness, Honesty, Simplicity)
- Established: 16 November 1906
- Founders: Brownell Gage; Warren B. Seabury; Edward H. Hume; William J. Hail
- Principal: Wang, Xu
- Faculty: 400
- Grades: 10 to 12
- Gender: coed
- Enrollment: 3400
- Campus type: Urban
- Colors: Blue, White and Red
- Website: www.yali.edu.cn

Yali High School (simplified Chinese: 雅礼中学; traditional Chinese: 雅禮中學), also known as Yali (雅礼) is a junior/senior high school located in Changsha, Hunan Province in the People's Republic of China, or a group of secondary schools containing Yali School itself and several branches.

== Overview ==
Yali High School is a first-tier key school in Hunan's public school system and is one of the most selective schools in the nation. Admission is competitive, based mainly on the score in city-wide or province-wide examinations as well as talent in science, music, sports, and the arts. The school and other three prestigious high schools in Changsha (including First High School of Changsha, Changjun High School and High School Attached to Hunan Normal University), are recognized "the Famous Four".

In 2007, Yali was included in the "Top 100 Schools" list published by the Top One-Hundred Schools website in China. It topped the list of the five schools that made to the top 100 from Hunan Province (This list published the schools by province and does not rank them nationally.)

== History ==
Founded in 1906 by Yale-in-China (雅礼协会), the Yali School (雅礼大学堂) was an American-owned private school during the first half of the 20th century and has been a public school since then. The name Yali 雅礼 (pinyin: Yǎ Lǐ) comes from a quote in the Analects of Confucius (论语 述而 7.18)"子所雅言，诗书执礼，皆雅言也", meaning refined (Yǎ 雅) and propriety (Lǐ 礼), and is a transliteration of Yale in the early 20th century. Yali's school colors are blue, white (Yale colors) and red (China).

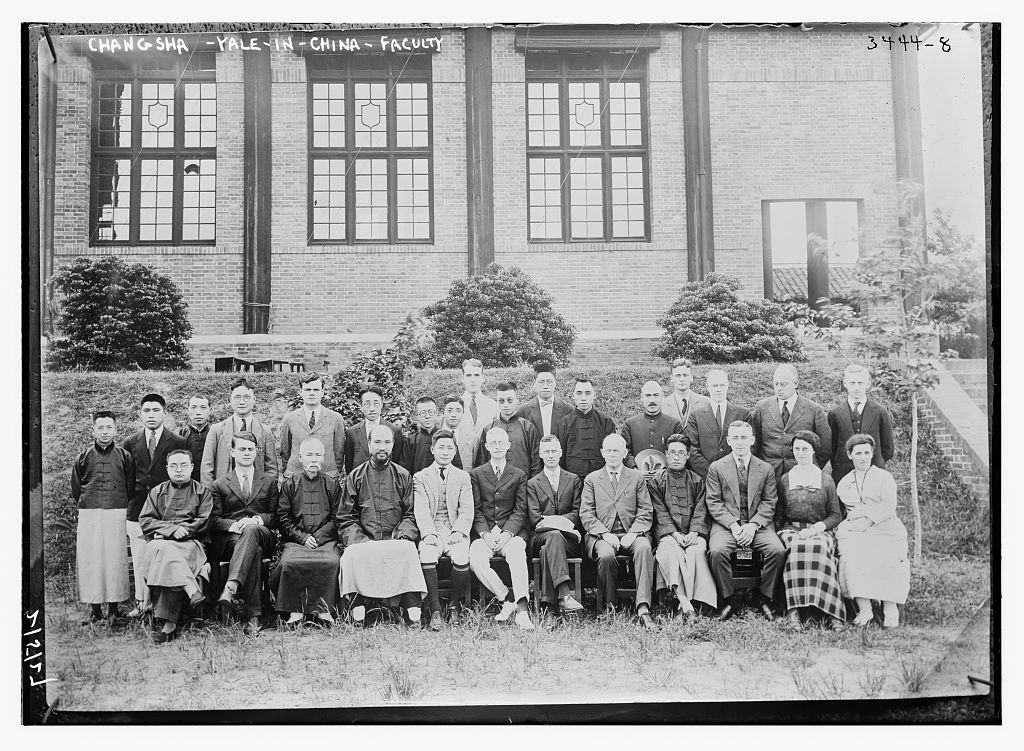
Yale-in-China faculty

=== Founding years ===
Brownell Gage, Warren Seabury, Lawrence Thurston, and Arthur Williams, all graduates of Yale College in the 1890s, founded Yale-in-China, and brought the mission to Changsha between 1901 and 1905. In 1906, the mission's preparatory school, or the Yali School, began operations. During the same year, Edward H. Hume, M.D., commenced the medical work in Changsha. His experiences are described in his 1946 book Doctors East, Doctors West: An American Physician's Life in China, (W. W. Norton & Company, Inc.). In 1912 Yali's first graduates received degrees.

=== Continued success ===
The campus was expanded in 1914. By 1928, Yali started opening up its administrative and leadership roles to Chinese educators. While Yali students were known for their academic performance, they were also athletes, with the school's athletic teams - soccer, volleyball, track, for example - winning provincial and national tournaments.

=== World War II years ===
In 1938, Yali students and faculty moved to Yuanling in western Hunan to avoid bombing in Changsha during the Japanese invasion of China. Teaching continued in Yuanling for seven years before the school returned to Changsha in 1946.

=== Early PRC years ===
In November 1948, the US government started evacuating Americans in China. Dr. Dwight Rugh became the last Yale-China representative in China. In 1951, Dr. Rugh was brought to the new gym on the Yali campus in a school-wide meeting to condemn "American Capitalist Invaders"; he returned to America via Hong Kong soon after. During the same year, the municipal government of Changsha took over the administration of the Yali School and changed its name to Changsha Number Five Middle School to be integrated into the city's public school system. The School's tie with Yale-China was cut off. During the next few decades, Yali experienced political turbulence that swept much of China.

Dwight Rugh is the father of Betty Jean Rugh (now BJ Elder), who grew up in Changsha and later moved to the United States with her parents. BJ Elder published a book in 2003 titled The Oriole's Song - An American Girlhood in Wartime China (see cited sources below), describing her childhood in Changsha on the Yali campus and the various trips she made back to China in the decades following the family's forced departure.

=== After the Cultural Revolution ===
In 1980, Yali, known at the time still as Changsha Number Five middle School, returned to operations from a whole decade of chaos. With the new reform and opening up policy instituted by Deng Xiaoping, more freedom to connect with the outside world was realized. Yali alumni from the first half of the 20th century started working between Changsha and New Haven, seeking to re-establish the Yale-China connection. In 1985, the school revived its relationship with the Yale-China Association and was once again known as Yali. The next year, Yale-China bachelors, now known as English Language Instructors ("ELI", also a nickname for Yalies), arrived on campus and resumed teaching responsibilities in the English Department.

=== Today ===
Since 1986, Yali has reinvented itself again as an institution of secondary education in China. While following a standard curriculum prescribed by the Ministry of Education, it expanded its education philosophy to include extracurriculars and specialty education. The school has received provincial and national recognitions for its high quality education to young minds.

In 1992, it was recognized as one of the first Provincial Key Schools in Changsha, establishing it as a premier institution in China's public school system. Yali has reached out to institutions in many other countries and established sister school relationships internationally. In 2001, the school received a delegation from Yale University led by Yale's president, Richard Levin, in celebration of both the Centennial of Yale-China Association as well as the Tercentennial of Yale University. In 2006, Yali celebrated its own Centennial, bringing back alumni and former teachers from all parts of the world.

Since 1999, Yali School have established several branches, some are complete secondary schools and some only contain junior high school. In 2006, the junior department of Yali stopped enrollment owing to certain education policy. The teachers and other staffs were moved to different Yali branches.

=== 2022 allegations ===
On December 29, 2022, a former student accused a former American teacher of sexually harassing and assaulting female students. Yali High School stated that it was investigating the allegations and that the teacher was no longer employed there. The education authorities in Changsha also launched an investigation.

== Campuses ==
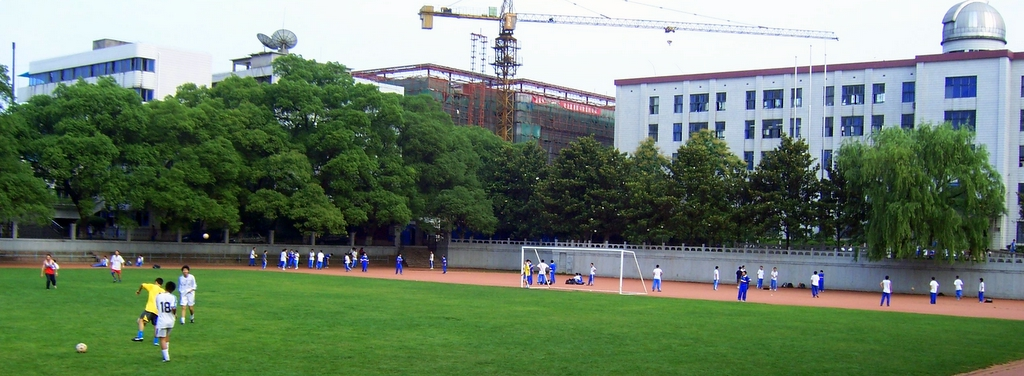
Soccer practice and main school building at Yali

=== Yali School ===
Yali School, or called the "Yali Headquarters", is a day school located near the city-center (on Laodong Road between Furong Ave and Shaoshan Ave). The main teaching building was rebuilt in 2012. In 2018, over 3000 students studied there. The International Department, which was founded in 2011, is also located at Yali School.

=== Nanya Middle School ===
Nanya Middle School (Chinese: 南雅中学, literally "South Yali Middle School" ), or "Yali Boarding Middle School" formerly, is a boarding school campus located in the southern Changsha (on Xiangzhang Road), with over 7000 students through Grade 7 to 12 in 2012. It was a private school at its establishment in 2002, but changed to public since 2012. It is one of the top schools in Hunan and is considered to be a second choice for students who prefer Yali. Its junior department is one of the major student sources of Yali: one-third of new students of Yali in 2013 are from Nanya.

=== Beiya Middle School ===
Beiya Middle School (Chinese: 北雅中学, literally "North Yali Middle School" ), established in 2009, is a public boarding school campus located in northern Changsha. In 2012, about 3000 students between Grades 7 and 9 attended Beiya.

=== Other Members of Yali Group ===
- Yiya Middle School is a high school set up for the residents of Yihaixincheng, the residences in suburban Changsha County in 2010.
- Yali Tianxin Middle School, formerly named Changsha Normal School, is a public junior high school which was taken over by Yali Group in 2013 supported by the Tianxin district government.
- Yali Yuhua Middle School is a public junior high school located on Huahou Road near Nanya, established in 2011.
- Yali Experimental School is a public junior high school set up in 2012, which was located on Laodong Road, about 100 meters from Yali, which was the temporary "west campus" for senior 2 and 3 students of Yali during the rebuilding of main teaching building from 2010 to 2012. In 2014, the school moved to Zuojiatang.
- Changya Experimental School is a public junior high school located in Beicheng Delta in Northern Changsha established in 2013.
- Yali-Peicui School is a private school located in the former Yali Experimental campus on Laodong Road established in 2016, which is the fruit of co-operation with Peicui Middle School.
- Yali Yanghu Middle School is a public high school located in the Xiangjiang New Area of Hunan in the west part of Changsha set up in 2017.

=== Other related schools ===
- Deya Middle School of Jinshi is a public junior high school set up for the educational cooperation between Changsha and Jinshi, a small city in Western Hunan in 2010, with 1800 students in 2011.
- Changya Middle School was a private school first set up in 1999, sharing the campus with Yali, specially for the students who haven't reach the standards of Yali's enrollment but are willing to pay a small fortune. The school revoked several years later, but the special "Changya Classes" remains until 2011.

== Curriculum and extracurricular ==
=== Academics ===
Yali graduates score among the highest in China's college entrance examinations and are accepted by the country's finest universities. Furthermore, numerous graduates from the school are accepted by various foreign institutions, either in North America or other countries. In recent years, many a graduates are admitted by first-tier universities, including Massachusetts Institute of Technology, Princeton University, Yale University, Cornell University, University of Oxford, University of Cambridge, etc., which is rare among Chinese high schools.

For all students, Chinese, Math, English, and physical education are required. Aside from these compulsory subjects, other curricular requirements include:

- 10th Grade: History, Physics, Biology, Politics, Chemistry, Geography, Music, Oral English, Information Technology
- 11th Grade: Fine Arts for all students, History, Politics, and Geography for students focusing on the Arts, and Physics, Chemistry, and Biology for students focusing on the Sciences.
- 12th Grade: History, Politics, and Geography for students focusing on the Arts, and Physics, Chemistry, and Biology for students focusing on the Sciences. This final year is mostly a preparatory year for the national college matriculation examinations.

All science classes have lab sessions.

Courses are also offered in computer science, graphic design, mechanics and robotics, research-oriented seminars, and others.

Students in Yali's International Department take AP courses and U.S. high school elective courses, in addition to Chinese high school coursework that prepare them for the high school diploma exam.

=== Specialty education ===
With its strength in science education, Yali has a long history of emphasizing and participating in science Olympiads, for which purpose the "01" class of each grade is established to give students specialized education in the natural sciences. In recent years, Yali students are noted for their achievements in all five natural science subjects, and in particular informatics: Yali students have won 9 gold medals and 1 silver medal in International Olympiad in Informatics and dozens of medals in National Olympiad in Informatics, which ranked first in the whole country, while the medals in other subjects including 1 gold and 1 silver medal in IMO, 1 gold medal in IChO, 1 gold medal in IBO and 2 gold medals in APhO.

The school has also started a research-oriented seminar program for students to carry out group projects in the social sciences, the arts, and community engagement.

The school also started a partnership with China's Central Conservatory of Music, in which a Yali Center for the Arts was established between the two institutions located in Nanya. The purpose of the partnership is to bring high-quality music education and discover young talent.

=== Sports ===
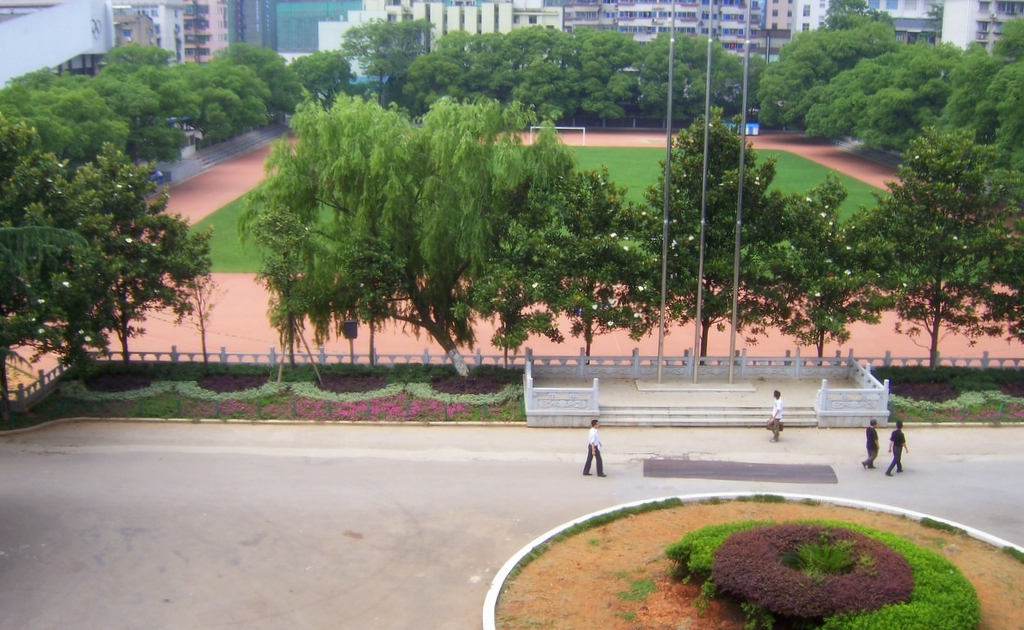
Yali School sports field

The school has an annual Yali Cup soccer game; each class unit in the same grade organizes its own teams and compete with other teams. With soccer and basketball being the most popular sports, the men's soccer team and women's basketball team have repeatedly won provincial tournaments and are placed high in national rankings. Physical education is required for students in all grades.

=== Clubs ===
Yali students participate in various extracurricular activities, including student newspaper, magazine, student union, radio station, TV station, orchestra, band, drama and traditional dance.

== Notable alumni ==
- Li Yining - economist, former Dean of Guanghua School of Management in Peking University
- Jin Yuelin - philosopher and logician
- Chen-Lu Tsou - biologist, Chinese Academy of Sciences fellow
- Chen Nengkuan - metallurgist and physicist, one of the founding fathers of Two Bombs, One Satellite
- He Fengshan - diplomat, activist in WWII, Righteous Among the Nations
- Liu Jingnan - geodesist and educator, Chinese Academy of Engineering fellow, the president of Duke Kunshan University from 2012.

== Sister schools ==
- St. Paul's School, Concord, New Hampshire, United States
- Foote School, New Haven, Connecticut, United States
- Nanhua Senior Vocational Supplementary High School, Taipei, Taiwan
- Hopkins School, New Haven, Connecticut, United States

== Bibliography ==
- Bevill, James P. (2021). Blackboards and Bomb Shelters : The Perilous Journey of Americans in China During World War II. Atglen, PA: Schiffer Military. ISBN 9780764362644.
- Yali Alumni Association, "雅礼大事记 (Major Events of Yali)", 雅礼简报 (Yali Brief) (alumni newspaper), 30 Sept., 2006.
- Chapman, Nancy E. (2001). The Yale-China Association: A Centennial History. Hong Kong: The Chinese University Press. ISBN 9789629960186.
- Wu, Xiaoxin (March 2, 2017). Christianity in China: A Scholars' Guide to Resources in the Libraries and Archives of the United States (2nd ed.). London: Taylor & Francis. ISBN 9781315493992.
- Elder, BJ (2003). The Oriole's Song: An American Girlhood in Wartime China. EastBridge. ISBN 978-1788690591. OCLC 647509163.
