= Xiangya School of Medicine =

Chinese medical college

- 湘雅医学院
- Type: Public
- Established: 1914; 112 years ago
- Parent institution: Central South University
- President: Xiang Chen
- Location: Changsha, China
- Campus: Urban
- Website: xysm.csu.edu.cn/EN/Home1.htm

Chinese name
- Simplified Chinese: 湘雅医学院
- Traditional Chinese: 湘雅醫學院
Transcriptions
Standard Mandarin
- Hanyu Pinyin: Xiāngyǎ Yīxuéyuàn

The Xiangya School of Medicine is the medical school of Central South University, in Changsha, Hunan, China. It was jointly established by the Hunan Yuqun Society and Yale-China Association in 1914, making it China's first medical school based on international collaboration.

The school is located in Changsha, the provincial capital of Hunan, and remains one of the top medical schools in the country for years running.

== Nomenclature ==
Xiangya has undergone a series of name changes and relocations. Since its establishment, it has been named:

- Xiangya Medical College (1914 - 1940)
- National Medical College (1940 - 1953)
- Hunan Medical College (1953 - 1987)
- Hunan Medical University (1987 - 2000).

On April 29, 2000, Hunan Medical University, Central South University of Technology and Changsha Railway Institute merged to form Central South University, and Hunan Medical University became "Xiangya School of Medicine" in Central South University.

The name "Xiangya" means “Hunan-Yale”, it was derived from the abbreviation of Hunan ("Xiang" or "Hsiang") and the Yale pronunciation of "ya".

== History ==
In 1901, stimulated by the Boxer Rebellion, the Yale-China Association, also called "Yale-in-China", an organization of Yale University faculty and students to help and preach in China, was formally established. Professor Harlan Page Beach was the first chairman and John Lawrence Thurston was the first secretary. The Thurston's visited China for two years and eventually persuaded the Yale-China Association to choose Changsha, Hunan in central China as its base for work in China. In 1906, they founded the Yali Union Middle School in Changsha. And Dr. Edward H. Hume opened central China's first Western Medicine clinic nearby, which was later renamed Xiangya Hospital.

In 1914, the Yali School was officially renamed Yale College. On December 8, 1914, the Xiangya Medical College, jointly founded by the Yale-China Association and the Hunan Yuqun Society, with the support of Tan Yankai, the governor of Hunan province, was officially opened, with Yan Fuqing as the principal. The Yale-China Association sent professors to teach at the school in English. The academic system, teaching content, teaching methods and equipment all adopted the American system. Students were enrolled nationwide. Xiangya was China's first medical school based on international collaboration.

In 1920, the number of students reached 42, and the first graduating class in the spring of the same year consisted of 11 students. The school was closed in 1927 and reopened in 1928.

In 1929, Yale College was merged into Huazhong University in Wuchang. Its campus in Changsha was occupied by "Hsiang-Ya Medical College", which soon became China's top medical school and enjoyed the reputation of "In the South Xiangya, in the North Union".

During the World Was II, Xiangya cared for thousands of casualties. In 1938, to escape Japanese bombing, the school moved to Yuanling in western Hunan, and to Guiyang, Guizhou Province, and other places of the country. In 1945, it moved back to Changsha. From 1921 to June 1949, Xiangya produced 351 graduates.

In early 1950s, the link between Xiangya and the Yale-China Association was cut when the Korean War broke out.

In 1979, the Yale-Huan partnership was resumed with the re-establishment of Sino-American diplomatic ties.

In 1996, Xiangya passed the preliminary review for the state "Project 211".

During the 2010s, Yale and Xiangya medical school created a new Medical Residency Training curriculum and implementation program for China, The new model has proved to be mutually-beneficial.

== Secondary schools and departments ==
There are 6 secondary schools in Xiangya, including the School of Basic Medicine, Xiangya School of Public Health, Xiangya School of Nursing, Xiangya School of Stomatology, Xiangya School of Pharmacy, and the School of Life Sciences. In addition, there are the Department of Medical Laboratory, Department of Anesthesiology, Department of Mental Health and Department of Experimental Animal Science.

== Affiliated hospitals ==
=== Directly affiliated hospitals ===
- Xiangya Hospital
- Xiangya Second Hospital
- Xiangya Third Hospital
- Xiangya Stomatological Hospital.

=== Non-directly affiliated hospitals ===
- Hunan Cancer Hospital,
- Hunan Children’s Hospital,
- Haikou Hospital,
- Changsha Hospital,
- Zhuzhou Hospital,
- Changde Hospital.

== Campuses ==
- Xiangya School of Medicine (Old campus): dormitories and academic buildings for medical postgraduates, with Xiangya Hospital and the State Key Laboratory of Medical Genetics of China.
- Xiangya School of Medicine (New campus): dormitories and academic buildings for medical undergraduates, with Third Xiangya Hospital and medical library.

== International Cooperation ==
Xiangya School of Medicine has established academic links with over 25 countries and districts. Xiangya School of Medicine keeps academic and student exchanges with the Yale Medical School. And there is decade-long cooperation between Xiangya School of Medicine and the University of Michigan Medical School. The school also runs the international Journal of Xiangya Medicine.

== Notable alumni ==
- Edward H. Hume
- Yan Fuqing
- Tang Feifan
- Zhang Xiaoqian
- He Fengshan
- Xie Shaowen
- Li Zhenpian

After the founding of the People's Republic of China, among the scientist stamps issued by the country, there were four medical scientists, among whom Zhang Xiaoqian and Tang Feifan are from Xiangya.

== Gallery ==
XiangYa Medical School at Central South University

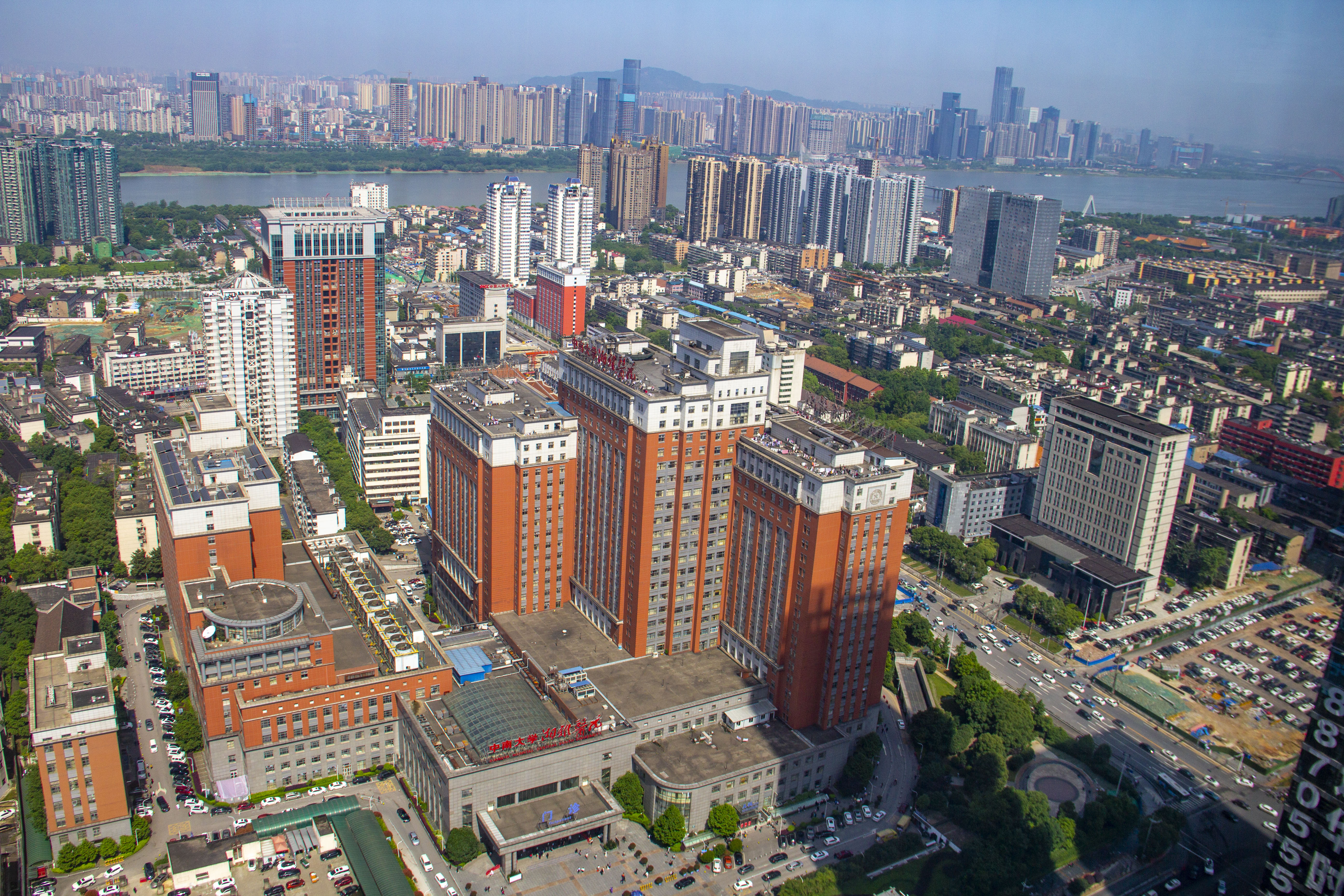
Xiangya Hospital and the old campus of Xiangya Medical School

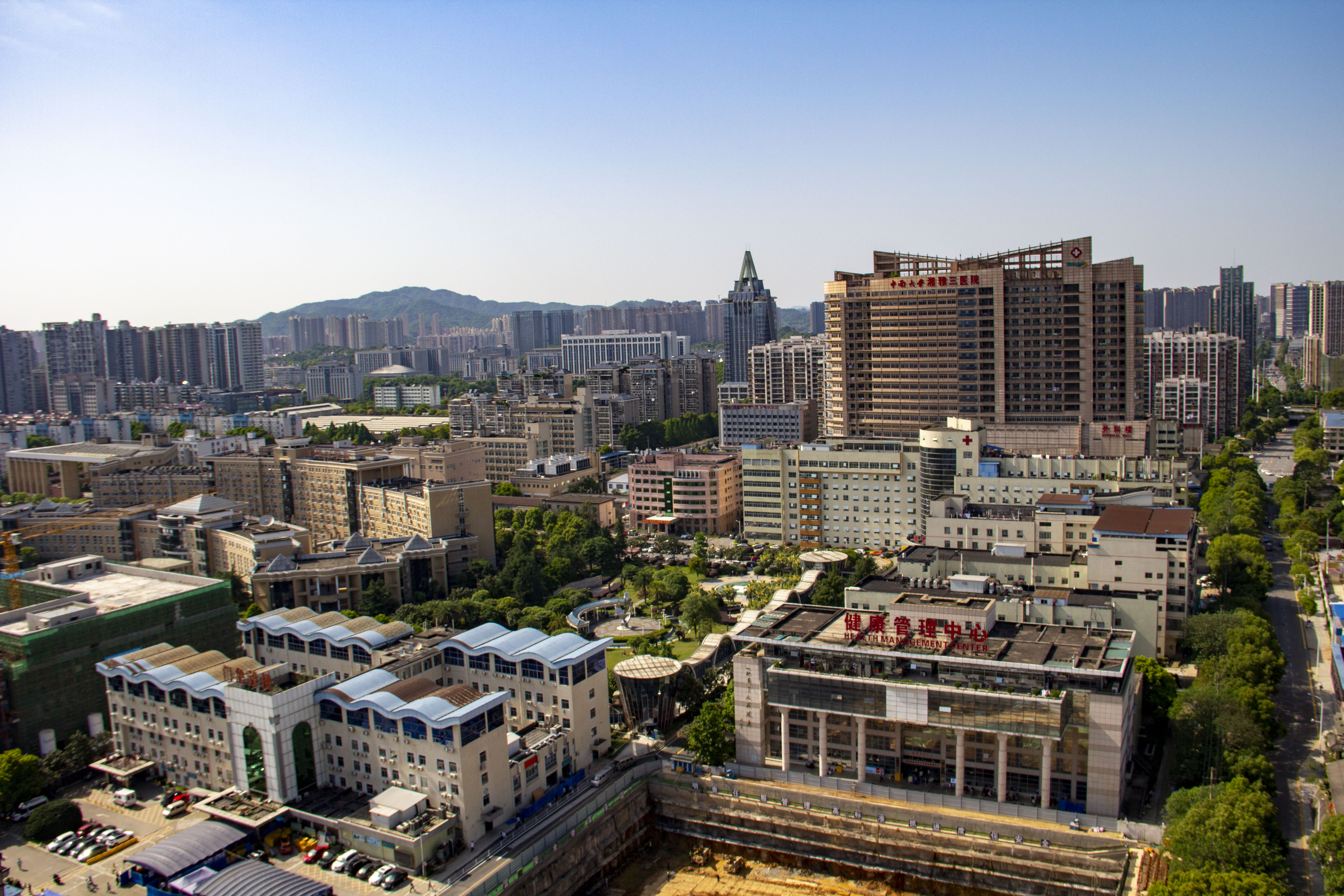
New Campus of Xiangya Medical School and the Third Xiangya Hospital
