= Jin Zhanpeng =

Chinese scientist (1938–2020)

- Born: November 6, 1938; Lipu, Guangxi, China
- Died: November 27, 2020 (aged 82); Changsha, Hunan, China
- Education: Central South University
- Scientific career
- Fields: Phase diagram Powder metallurgy
- Workplaces: Central South University
- Doctoral advisor: Huang Peiyun

Chinese name
- Traditional Chinese: 金展鵬
- Simplified Chinese: 金展鹏
Transcriptions
Standard Mandarin
- Hanyu Pinyin: Jīn Zhǎnpéng

Jin Zhanpeng (Chinese: 金展鹏; 6 November 1938 – 27 November 2020) was a Chinese scientist specializing in phase diagram and powder metallurgy. He was a member of the Chinese Communist Party. He was an academician of the Chinese Academy of Sciences (CAS).

== Biography ==
Jin was born in Lipu, Guangxi, on November 6, 1938. After graduating from Central South University in 1960, he taught at the university. In 1979 he became a visiting scholar under the recommendation of Huang Peiyun. He returned to China in 1981 and continued to teach at Central South University. In 1998, he suddenly fell ill and was paralyzed after rescue. He died of illness in Changsha, Hunan, on November 27, 2020, aged 82.

== Honors and awards ==
- 1991 State Natural Science Award (Third Class)
- November 25, 2003 Member of the Chinese Academy of Sciences (CAS)
