= Tang Feifan =

Chinese medical microbiologist

- 湯飛凡
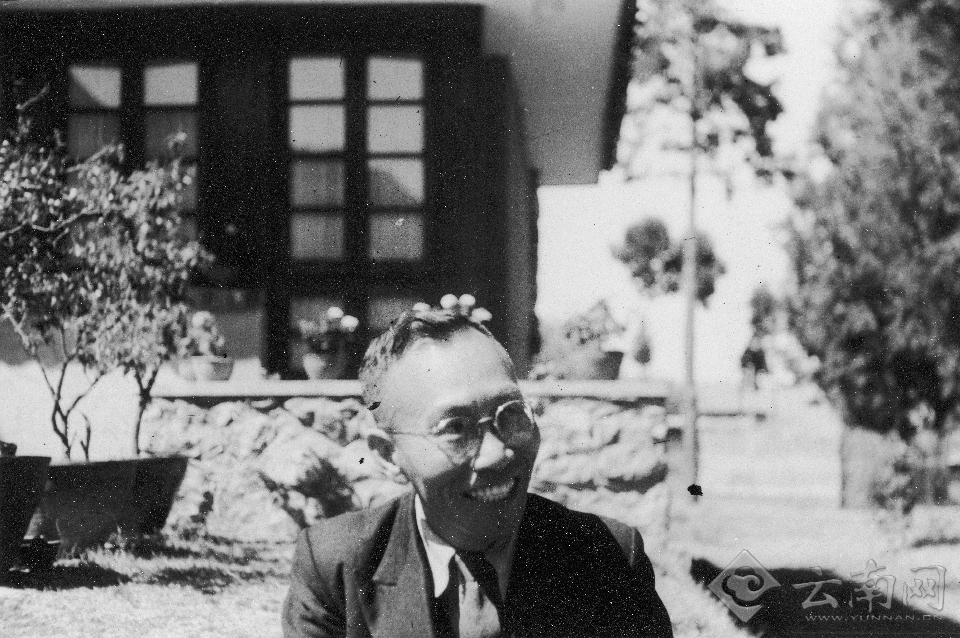
- Tang Feifan in 1944 in Kunming, Yunnan.
- Born: Tang Ruizhao (湯瑞昭); July 23, 1897; Liling, Hunan, Qing China
- Died: September 30, 1958 (aged 61); Beijing, China
- Education: Chengnan School; Xiangya College of Medicine; Yale University; Peking Union Medical College; Harvard University
- Known for: Chlamydia trachomatis
- Spouse: He Lian (m. 1925; died 1958)
- Scientific career
- Fields: Medical microbiology
- Workplaces: Central Epidemic Prevention Laboratory
- Doctoral advisor: Hans Zinsser

Tang Feifan (simplified Chinese: 汤飞凡; traditional Chinese: 湯飛凡; pinyin: Tāng Fēifán; July 23, 1897 – September 30, 1958) was a Chinese medical microbiologist best known for culturing the Chlamydia trachomatis agent in the yolk sacs of eggs.

Tang was persecuted during the "Pulling Out Bourgeois White Flag Movement" and committed suicide in 1958.

== Biography ==
=== Early life ===
Tang was born Tang Ruizhao (湯瑞昭) in Tangjiaping Village of Liling, Hunan, on July 23, 1897, to a relatively poor gentry family, during the Qing Empire. He was the second of three children. He had a younger brother, Tang Qiufan (湯秋凡). His father Tang Luquan (湯麓泉) taught at a family friend He Zhongshan's (何忠善) old-style private school, in which Tang Feifan studied poetry, history, philosophy, mathematics, and natural science. His son, He Jian, became Tang Feifan's close friend. "Learning from the West with its advanced science and technology；Invigorating the Chinese nation", Tang had often heard the hometown folks talk about reform and revolution in his childhood. When China was often called the "sick man of Asia", Tang determined to study medicine science.

=== Education ===
At the age of twelve, he attended Chengnan School in Changsha, capital of Hunan province. After graduating from the Xiangya Medical College (now part of Central South University) in 1921, he earned his doctoral degree in medical science from Yale University. He went back to China in 1921 and that year studied, then taught at Peking Union Medical College. In 1925 he went to the United States again to study bacteriology under Professor Hans Zinsser at Harvard University. He returned to China in 1929 and in the meantime became professor at Medical School of National Central University. In 1935 he was recruited as a researcher at the British National Institute for Medical Research, a position in which he remained until 1937.

=== Second Sino-Japanese War ===
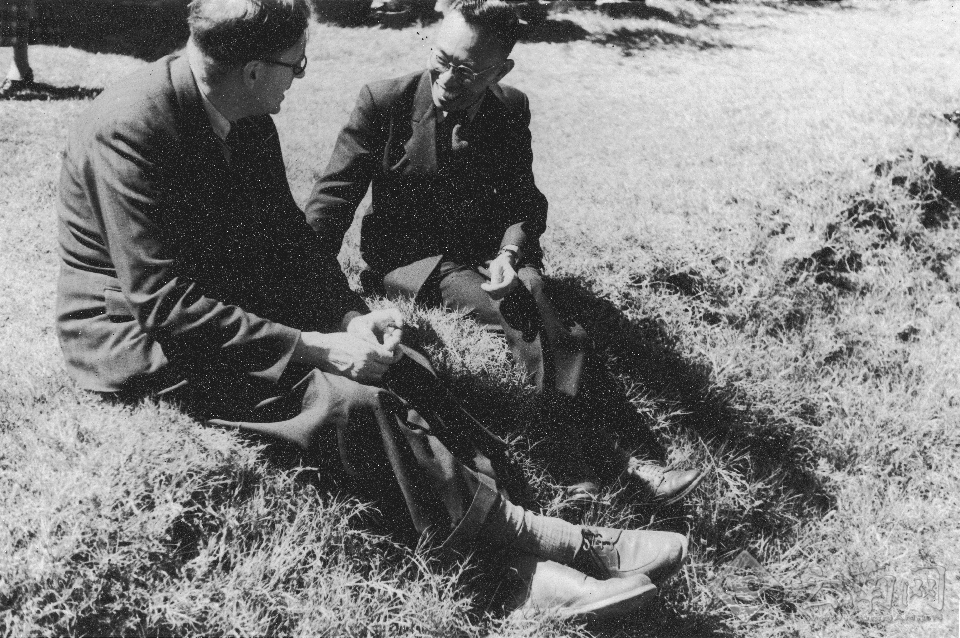
Tang Feifan and Joseph Needham in 1944 in Kunming, Yunnan.

After the outbreak of the Second Sino-Japanese War in 1938, he founded the Central Epidemic Prevention Laboratory in Kunming, capital of southwest China's Yunnan province, and served as its director. In 1943, he led the team that produced China's first batch of penicillin. After war he established China's first antibiotic research and penicillin production workshop, as well as normal BCG vaccine laboratory.

In 1947 he paid a fact-finding visit to the United Kingdom, attended the 4th World Conference of International Union of Microbiological Societies (IUMS) in the Kingdom of Denmark, and became its standing committee.

=== People's Republic era ===
After the establishment of the Communist State, Tang successively served as director of Institute of Biological Products of the Ministry of Health, director of Chinese Medical Association, and director general of Chinese Society for Microbiology. In 1950 he joined the newly created National Institute for the Control of Pharmaceutical and Biological Products, working as its director. During his time in office, he directed to develop China's first biological products specification - Verification Regulation of Biological Products (生物製品檢定規程（草案）). That same year, a terrible plague hit the whole north China, he developed China's own yellow fever vaccine.

In the mid-1950s, he first cultured the Chlamydia trachomatis agent in the yolk sacs of eggs.

In 1958, the "Pulling Out Bourgeois White Flag Movement" (拔资产阶级白旗运动) broke out. Tang was denounced and labeled as "capitalist academic authority", "scum of the nation", "a faithful running dog for the Kuomintang reactionaries", "American spy", "International spy", "a large white flag on the socialist positions", "ride on the backs of the people", "pseudo scientist", "sell the interests of his own country". Because of the unbearable insult he killed himself on September 30, 1958.

In 1978, the Communist Party rehabilitated many victims who suffered political persecution or died in the mass socialism political movements except Tang Feifan. In June 1979, the Ministry of Health held a memorial service for him.

In 1981, the International Organization Against Trachoma (IOAT) bestowed its gold medal upon him. He was held in high esteem by British sinologist Joseph Needham.

On 20 November 1992, China Post issued a stamp commemorating Tang Feifan as part of the third set of its "Modern Chinese Scientists" stamp series (serial number 1992-19). 55 million copies were printed.

== Personal life ==
In 1925, Tang married He Lian (何璉), daughter of He Jian, a warlord and governor of Hunan province.

== See also ==
- Chlamydia trachomatis
- Hundred Flowers Campaign
- Anti-Rightist Movement
- Cultural Revolution
