= Preston Schoyer =

American writer

- Born: June 13, 1911; Pittsburgh, Pennsylvania
- Died: March 13, 1978 (aged 66); Stamford, Connecticut
- Education: Yale University
- Occupations: Novelist; journalist; writer; China scholar
- Employer(s): Worldwide Press Service; The Saturday Review; The New Yorker; The New York Times Magazine
- Known for: The Foreigners (1942); The Indefinite River (1947); The Ringing of the Glass (1950); The Typhoon's Eye (1959)
- Board member of: Yale–China Association; Executive Director (1973 – 1978, his death); National Committee on United States–China Relations; Executive Director (1969–1973)
- Spouse: Doreen Weir Schoyer
- Children: Penelope and Elizabeth "Lisa"
- Parent(s): William Edward Schoyer and Lucy Cushing Turner Schoyer
- Awards: Legion of Merit; Soldier's Medal

Barclay Preston Schoyer (June 13, 1911 – March 13, 1978) was active in American groups dealing with China, including the Yale-China Association, and the author of four novels and many articles on China.

== Career ==
Schoyer studied at Yale College, where he wrote and illustrated for campus humor magazine The Yale Record. The Residential College he was affiliated with was Pierson. After graduation in 1933, Schoyer taught English in Changsha, Hunan, for what was then the Yale-in-China Association, and returned to Yale to study Oriental literature and Chinese language. His return to China was cut short by the impending war. In 1940, he made a dramatic escape from Changsha. After the city had been bombed eight times, he led a group of twenty doctors, nurses, and wounded by junk to escape on the Xiang River after dark, only to be discovered and attacked on the river in the morning by a Japanese fighter plane. He managed to get the party out through Indo-China in six weeks. In the summer of 1941, Schoyer dated author Margaret Wise Brown.

When the United States entered the war, he became a major in Air Intelligence, and created the Air Ground Aid Section (AGAS), which instructed airmen in how to evade or escape if downed behind enemy lines. He worked with Chinese guerrillas on several rescue operations. At the end of the war, he headed a mission to liberate seven thousand Allied prisoners being held in Lunghua Civilian Assembly Centre at Shanghai. For this work, Schoyer won the Legion of Merit and Soldier's Medal."

As representative of Yale-in-China in Hong Kong in the early 1950s, he conducted negotiations between New Asia College and the government of the colony in establishing the college as an officially recognized school. From 1959 till July 1964, he was the Comptroller and Yale-in-China representative for New Asia. He was also the president of the Universities Service Centre in Hong Kong and special assistant to the vice-chancellor of the University. Schoyer was on the first delegation to the People's Republic organized by the National Committee on U. S.- China Relations in December 1972, participating in Nixon's Ping Pong Diplomacy effort. In 1978, several years after having returned to Yale-in-China as executive director, he became seriously ill and in March died of lung cancer.

== Literary works ==
Schoyer wrote four novels with Chinese backgrounds: The Foreigners (1942), The Indefinite River (1947), The Ringing of the Glass (1950), and The Typhoon's Eye (1959).

The Foreigners concerns a group of white expatriates living in a city very much like Changsha. Schoyer told Edward Gulick, who had taught in Changsha with him, that the hero of The Foreigners, Peter Achilles, was a combination of himself and Gulick (an earlier Yale-in-China Bachelor, who served from 1913 to 1914, was named Paul Achilles). Achilles tells a friend: "I came out here for a year, just to see the world before I settled down; but I've stayed two and now I'm staying for another. And after that, perhaps I'll stay forever. China's fatal, isn't it? It's like a drug." "More than that," his friend replies, "It changes people. It hurts some and makes other magnificent."

In addition to his novels, Schoyer worked as a correspondent for the Worldwide Press Service and a regular contributor to The Saturday Review, The New Yorker, The Reporter, and The New York Times Magazine.
