= Ning Jinsheng =

Chinese engineer (1932–2020)

- Born: October 22, 1932; Tianjin, China
- Died: March 15, 2020 (aged 87); Wuhan, Hubei, China
- Education: Tongji University
- Scientific career
- Fields: Earth gravity
- Workplaces: Wuhan University
- Academic advisors: Xia Jianbai; Wang Zhizhuo; Ye Xue'an (叶雪安)
- Doctoral students: Li Jiancheng

Chinese name
- Traditional Chinese: 寧津生
- Simplified Chinese: 宁津生
Transcriptions
Standard Mandarin
- Hanyu Pinyin: Níng Jīnshēng

Ning Jinsheng (Chinese: 宁津生; October 22, 1932 – March 15, 2020) was a Chinese engineer who was a professor at Wuhan University, a president of Wuhan University of Surveying and Mapping Technology, and an academician of the Chinese Academy of Engineering (CAE).

== Biography ==
Ning was born in Tianjin, on October 22, 1932, while his ancestral home was in Tongcheng County, Anhui. In September 1951, he entered Tongji University, where he studied surveying under Xia Jianbai, Wang Zhizhuo, and Ye Xue'an (叶雪安). After graduating in 1956, he was assigned to the Wuhan Institute of Surveying and Mapping (武汉测量制图学院) as an assistant. In May 1966, during the Cultural Revolution, he was forced to work in the dining room instead of teaching in classrooms. In August 1984, he was appointed vice-president of Wuhan University of Surveying and Mapping Technology (武汉测绘科技大学), rising to the president position in January 1988. In August 2000, Wuhan University of Surveying and Mapping Technology was merged into Wuhan University, and he served as professor and doctoral supervisor of the university. On March 15, 2020, he died in Wuhan, Hubei, aged 87.

== Honours and awards ==
- 1995 Member of the Chinese Academy of Engineering (CAE)
