= Central South University =

National university in Changsha, China

- 中南大学
- Motto: 知行合一，经世致用
- Motto in English: Create Knowledge and Serve Society
- Type: Public
- Established: 29 April 2000; 26 years ago
- President: Jiancheng Li
- CCP Committee Secretary: Yi Hong
- Faculty: 18,000 (January 2020)
- Students: 58,000 (January 2020)
- Undergraduates: 34,000 (January 2020)
- Postgraduates: 22,000 (January 2020)
- Location: Changsha, Hunan, China; 28.173°N 112.925°E
- Campus: Urban, 381 ha
- Colors: Blue
- Website: www.csu.edu.cn

Chinese name
- Simplified Chinese: 中南大学
- Traditional Chinese: 中南大學
Transcriptions
Standard Mandarin
- Hanyu Pinyin: Zhōngnán dàxué
- IPA: [ʈʂʊ́ŋ.nǎn tâ.ɕɥě]

Central South University (CSU; 中南大学) is a public university in Changsha, Hunan, China. Funded and overseen by China's Ministry of Education, it is a member of Project 985, Project 211, and the Double First-Class Construction initiatives. It was formed on April 29, 2000, through the merger of Hunan Medical University, Changsha Railway University, and Central South University of Technology. Central South University is ranked #131 in best global universities in U.S. News & World Report, #83 in Academic Ranking of World Universities (ARWU).

CSU encompasses 12 fields of study: engineering, science, medicine, literature, law, economics, management, philosophy, education, history, agriculture, and the arts. The main campus is located in Yuelu District in Changsha. There are also several other campuses across the city. Following a campus renaming initiative in January 2025, the main campus was named Yuelushan Campus, while the others are now known as Lunan Campus (formerly South Campus), Xiaoxiang Campus (formerly New Campus), Xinglin Campus (formerly Xiangya New Campus), Kaifu Campus (formerly Xiangya Old Campus), and Tianxin Campus (formerly Railway Campus).

Central South University (CSU) comprises 33 secondary schools/colleges and offers 105 undergraduate programs, with 90 programs currently open for admission. The university has 72 national first-class undergraduate program construction sites. Regarding enrollment and faculty, CSU has a total of 63,919 full-time students, including 35,957 undergraduates, 16,587 master's students, 9,228 doctoral students, and 1,999 international students. The university employs 5,926 in-service faculty and staff (excluding affiliated hospitals).

== History ==
CSU was established by approval of the State Council on 29 April 2000 by merging three separate universities: Hunan Medical University (HMU), Changsha Railway University (CRU) and Central South University of Technology (CSUT).

- HMU, formerly under the administration of the Ministry of Health, dates back to 1914 when Xiangya Medical College was founded through the joint efforts of Hunan Yuqun Society and the Yale-China Association. Founded by Dr. Edward Hicks Hume and Yan Fuqing. Hunan Yukun Society was named "Xiangya" after the abbreviation of Hunan "Xiang", and the Yale pronunciation of "ya".
- CRU, one of the universities under the administration of the Ministry of Railways, initially restructured in 1953 as Central South College of Civil Engineering and Architecture. It was established in 1960 based on its predecessor's teaching and research divisions.
- CSUT, one of universities under the administration of the Ministry of Education, was originally named Central South Institute of Mining and Metallurgy in 1952 when a nationwide restructuring of institutes of higher education began. It incorporated departments of mining and metallurgy from six universities including Wuhan University, Sun Yat-sen University, Guangxi University, Hunan University, Nanchang University and Beijing Institute of Technology.

== Academics ==
University rankings
| BCUR National | Domestic | 27 |
| Wu Shulian National | Domestic | 11 |
| CUAA National | Alumni | 28 |
| QS National | General | 32 |
| THE National | General | 19 |
| QS Asia (Asia version) | General | =168 |
| ARWU World | Research | 94 |
| QS World | General | =491 |
| THE World | General | 251–300 |
| USNWR World | General | =146 |

Central South University (CSU) is a national key university under the direct administration of the Ministry of Education of China and a member of the Double First Class University Plan, former nationally prestigious Project 211 and Project 985. CSU covers an area of 392.4 hectares with campuses located across the Xiang River at the base of the Yuelu Hill close to its neighbor Hunan University.

CSU offers 83 bachelor's degrees, 282 master's degrees and 142 doctorate degrees from 31 colleges and institutes and a graduate school.

- Literature and Journalism
- Foreign Languages
- Architecture and Art
- Business School
- Law School
- Marxism
- Public Administration
- Mathematics and Statistics
- Physics
- Chemistry and Chemical Engineering
- Mechanical and Electrical Engineering
- Energy Science and Engineering
- Material Science and Engineering
- Powder Metallurgy Research Institute
- Traffic and Transportation Engineering
- Civil Engineering
- Metallurgy and Environment
- Geoscience and Environmental Engineering
- Info-physics and Geomatics Engineering
- Resources and Safety Engineering
- Minerals Processing and Bioengineering
- Information Science and Engineering
- Xiangya School of Medicine
- Pharmaceutical Sciences
- Public Health
- Basic Medical Sciences
- Stomatology
- School of Life Sciences
- Research Department of Physical Education
- School of Aeronautics and Astronautics
- Aier School of Ophthalmology

CSU is also home to numerous national key disciplines, including 6 national key first-level disciplines, 12 national key second-level disciplines, and 59 national key clinical specialties. The university offers 94 undergraduate programs, 58 master's programs (first-level disciplines), 33 doctoral programs (first-level disciplines), and 31 postdoctoral research stations. Seven disciplines rank among the global top 1% in the ESI rankings: Materials Science, Engineering, Clinical Medicine, Chemistry, Pharmacology and Toxicology, Biology and Biochemistry, and Neuroscience and Behavioral Science. In addition, CSU boasts 6 affiliated hospitals, including 3 renowned Xiangya hospitals, Xiangya Stomatology Hospital, the Affiliated Hospital of Xiangya School of Medicine, and Haikou Hospital.

== Facilities ==
CSU has six campuses:

Yuelushan Campus

- Main campus: dormitories and academic buildings for junior undergraduates and postgraduates of most engineering schools, two state key laboratories, as well as office buildings.
- South campus: dormitories for all freshman and postgraduates of all humanities schools, as well as office buildings.
- New campus: academic buildings for all freshman and all humanities and science postgraduates, as well as office and library buildings.
- Xiangya School of Medicine (Old campus): dormitories and academic buildings for medical postgraduates, with Xiangya Hospital and the State Key Laboratory of Medical Genetics of China.
- Xiangya School of Medicine (New campus): dormitories and academic buildings for medical undergraduates, with Third Xiangya Hospital and medical library.
- Railway campus: dormitories and academic buildings for junior undergraduates and postgraduates of civil engineering, traffic engineering, software engineering, and architecture, as well as office and library buildings.
- School of Life Sciences (previously known as School of Biological Sciences): a secondary school established in May 2003

Xiaoxiang Campus

Tianxin Campus

Xinglin Campus

== Notable alumni ==
=== Academics ===
- Tang Feifan, medical microbiologist, best known for culturing the Chlamydia trachomatis agent in the yolk sacs of eggs, one of the earliest academician of Chinese Academy of Sciences.
- Zhang Xiaoqian, gastroenterologist, is considered the founder of gastroenterology in China. He served as President of Hsiang-Ya Medical College and Vice President of Peking Union Medical College, and was a founding member of both Academia Sinica and the Chinese Academy of Sciences.
- Huang Boyun, powder metallurgist, academician of Chinese Academy of Engineering, former President of the Central South University.
- Jin Zhanpeng, materials scientist, academician of Chinese Academy of Sciences.
- Wang Dianzuo, mineral engineering scientist, academician of Chinese Academy of Sciences, Chinese Academy of Engineering and National Academy of Engineering, former President of Central South University of Technology (now merged into the Central South university).
- Chen Zhiwu, professor of Finance at Yale School of Management and an influential public intellectual in China.

=== Politics and Public Service ===
- Guo Shengkun, member of Politburo of the Chinese Communist Party, Central Secretariat secretary, Secretary of the Central Political and Legal Affairs Commission of the Chinese Communist Party.
- Lu Zhangong, Vice Chairman of the Chinese People's Political Consultative Conference, former Communist Party Secretary of Fujian and Henan provinces.
- Zhao Lijian, Deputy Director of Foreign Ministry Information Department of the People's Republic of China, Foreign Ministry Spokesperson of the People's Republic of China.

=== Business and entrepreneurship ===
- Li Zexiang, Founder and CEO of DJI.
- Wang Chuanfu, Founder and CEO of BYD.
- Liang Wengen, Founder and Chairman of Sany Group.

== Collaborating universities ==
The University has established long-term contacts and cooperative relationships with over 200 colleges and universities as well as research institutions from 20 countries and regions. At present, international students coming from more than 80 countries and regions are studying in CSU. The following is a list of some partner institutions of central south university:

Lunan Campus

- Yale University

- University of California, Berkeley (UC Berkeley)

- Emory University

- University of Pittsburgh (PITT)

- Cornell University

- Purdue University Calumet

- University of Southern California (USC)

Banyue Lake

- San Francisco State University (SFSU)

- University of California, Riverside (UC Riverside)

- California State University, Fullerton (CSUF)

- California State University, Northridge (CSUN)

- Illinois Institute of Technology (IIT)

- The University of Arizona (UA)

- Kent State University

- Auburn University

- Temple University

- The University of Texas

- Texas A&M University

- University of Missouri–Rolla

- University of Missouri–Columbia (MU)

- Utah State University (USU)

- The University of Tennessee

- Montana Tech of the University of Montana

- West Virginia University (WVU)

- Georgia Health Sciences University

- University of British Columbia (UBC)

- University of Ottawa

- Western University (University of Western Ontario)

- University of Oxford

- University of Cambridge

- Queen Mary, University of London

- University of Birmingham

- Imperial College London

- The University of Manchester

- Loughborough University

- The University of Dundee

- Bangor University

- University of Glasgow

- The University of Leeds

- University of Strathclyde

- University of Wolverhampton

- Keele University

- ESC Rennes School of Business

- University of Paris-Sud

- Le Pôle ESG Paris

- University of Orléans

- Claude Bernard University Lyon 1

- Université François-Rabelais de Tours

- Technische Universität Kaiserslautern

- University of Wuppertal

- TU Bergakademie Freiberg

- Norwegian University of Science and Technology

- Luleå University of Technology

- Faculté Polytechnique de Mons

- Rovaniemi University of Applied Sciences (RUAS)

- Tilburg University

- Arcadia University

- Università Politecnica delle Marche

- Belarusian State University of Transport

- MATI Russian State Technological University

- Siberian Federal University

- Saint Petersburg State Polytechnical University

- Bratsk State Technological University

- V. N. Karazin Kharkiv National University

- Kryvyi Rih Technical University

- The University of Sydney

- Monash University

- University of Queensland

- University of Wollongong

- The University of Western Australia (UWA)

- University of Lubumbashi

- The University of Tokyo

- Waseda University

- Akita University

- Nagasaki University

- Kagoshima University

- The University of Shiga Prefecture

- Health Sciences University of Hokkaido

- Fukui University of Technology

- Ajou University

- Chonbuk National University

- Ewha Womans University

- Inje University

- Kyung Hee University

- Pai Chai University

- Jeonju University

- Hankuk University of Foreign Studies

- Woosong University

- Konkuk University

- Youngsan University

- Yonsei University

- Chaoyang University of Technology

- Feng Chia University

- University of Tainan

- I-Shou University

- Chinese Culture University

- National Yunlin University of Science and Technology

- Tzu Chi University

- National Kaohsiung First University of Science and Technology

- Ming Chuan University

- National Taiwan University of Arts

- National Taipei University of Nursing and Health Sciences

- Providence University

- The Hong Kong Polytechnic University

- City University of Hong Kong

- Hong Kong Baptist University

- Singapore Management University
