= Changjun High School =

- 长郡中学

Location
- 24 Xueyuan Street, Tianxin District; Changsha, Hunan; China

Information
- Type: Public, Senior secondary
- Motto: 朴实沉毅 (Honest and Perseverance)
- Established: 1904
- Founder: Yan Zhongji
- Principal: Zhigang Deng (邓智刚)
- Grades: 10-12
- Gender: Coeducational
- Day: Day
- Website: http://www.changjun.com.cn/

Changjun High School (simplified Chinese: 长郡中学; traditional Chinese: 長郡中學, literally Changsha County High School), also known as Changjun (长郡) is a key model high school in Hunan Province. In a 2016 ranking of Chinese high schools that send students to study in American universities, Changjun High School ranked number 33 in mainland China in terms of the number of students entering top American universities.

In 1904, the Prefecture of Changsha established "Changsha prefectural school", which was the earliest prefectural school at that time. In 1912, after the prefectural system was abolished, Hunan Changjun state-owned High School was founded based on the prefectural school. Later, the school was renamed as Hunan First United County-owned High School, Changjun State-owned school, Hunan Changjun United High School, Changsha First High School (in 1951), Changsha Second High School and Changjun High School in 1984.

In the fall of 2009, Changjun new campus formally opened. It cost 320 million yuan and was invested by Changsha Municipal Government. The new campus is located in the leading area of "the two-oriented society" called Octagon Area, covering an area of 150 acres. Changjun 2 campuses in the east and west of Xiangjiang River take off together and the school's development has turned a new page.
