= Edward H. Hume =

American missionary doctor and educator in China

Edward Hicks Hume (1876–1957) was a missionary doctor and educator best known for his work in China for the Yale-in-China Mission and his writings on Chinese medicine. After some twenty years of medical work, which included organizing the Hsiang-Ya Medical College, which still functions in Changsha today, Hume resigned in a dispute with the home office when he favored turning control of the school over to Chinese during the anti-imperialist campaigns of 1925–1927.

He died in Wallingford, Connecticut, February 8, 1957. The Humes had five children: Theodore Carswell (1904–1943); Charlotte Elizabeth Hume Freeman (1906–1994); Margery (1909–1911); Edward Welch (1913–1915); and Kathrina Joy Hume Falk (1917–1986). Lotta Hume (1876–1976) died on February 17, 1976, in La Jolla, California.

== Biography ==
Hume was born in Ahmednagar, India, and educated there by his father, whose father before him had also worked as a teacher and missionary. He received his B.A. from Yale College (1897) and his M.D. from Johns Hopkins Medical School (1901). After marriage to Charlotte ("Lotta") Carswell in 1903, the couple returned to India. From 1903–1905 Hume was in Bombay as an Acting Assistant Surgeon in the Commissioned Corps of the United States Public Health Service to monitor the Plague outbreak that had started in 1896. When the newly established Yale-in-China Mission, as it was then called, recruited the couple in 1906, they went to work in Changsha, Hunan.

Hume described the allure of China, where there were not the government medical colleges there had been in India, as allowing him to achieve his ambitions in medical training. He represented a new generation of missionaries who thought in different terms from the earlier emphasis on purely evangelical work. "Get hold of the students, of the educated men – and China will be won." Although he insisted on using only the scientific medicine he had learned at Johns Hopkins, Hume assumed that Chinese would be won to Western ways and Christian religion only if he learned and respected Chinese culture. Hume recruited Chinese medical co-workers, raised funds, negotiated agreements, and laid the groundwork for the Yale-in-China hospital which opened in 1917. He served as senior physician, dean of Hunan Medical College, professor of medicine, and liaison with Chinese medical boards and professional journals. His aim was to develop educational and medical work "under the strongest Christian influence and under the highest intellectual and scientific standards of teaching and research."

In 1926, as other foreigners in China condemned the anti-foreign campaigns of the rising Nationalist Party, Hume declared his understanding of their attitudes. "No one can give effective service to China today, whom the Chinese do not welcome. We are guests here." When Yali students took to the streets in violent protest of the May Thirtieth Incident of 1925, however, Hume found it impossible to simultaneously placate them, reassure his Chinese and American colleagues, and satisfy the trustees in New Haven. He came to doubt the worth of the American staff and even of the Yali Bachelors, recent Yale graduates who came to Changsha to teach English. When the Trustees rejected his proposal that the medical school and college be turned over to the Chinese, he offered his resignation.

In the years that followed, Hume became director and executive vice-president of the New York Post-Graduate Medical School and Hospital. From 1934 to 1937 he conducted a survey of medical facilities for the Chinese National Health Administration and went on to carry out such a survey in India. Hume also helped to organize the Christian Medical Council for Overseas Work, of which he was secretary from 1938 to 1946. He participated or served as an officer in a number of organizations, such as Yale-in-China (Trustee, 1927–1954, President 1934–1936, and Vice-President, 1955–1957); the Associated Boards for Christian Colleges in China; and the American Council of the Institute of Pacific Relations.

== Writings ==
- Hume, Edward H. (1940). The Chinese Way in Medicine. Baltimore: The Johns Hopkins Press. HathiTrust Online HERE
- --, Doctors East, Doctors West; an American Physician's Life in China (New York: Norton, 1946).
- --, Doctors Courageous (New York: Harper, 1950). Internet Archive link HERE.
- --, William Winston Pettus, Dauntless Adventurer: The Story of Dr. Winston Pettus (New Haven, CT: Yale in China Association, 1952).
