= Yale-China Association =

American non-profit organisation promoting US-China relations

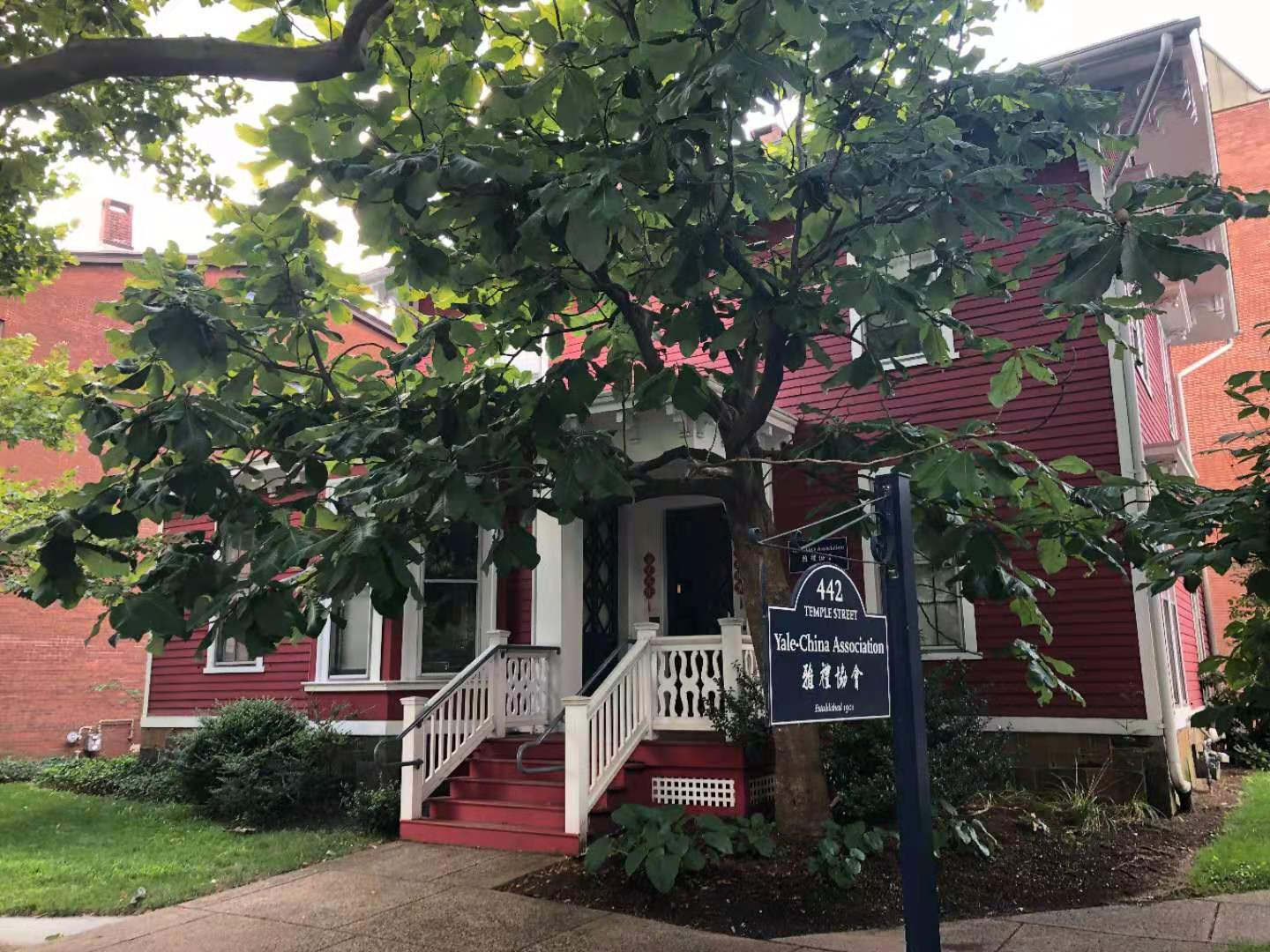
- Type: 501(c)(3) organization
- Tax ID no.: 06-0646971
- Website: www.yalechina.org
- Formerly called: Yale-in-China

The Yale-China Association (Chinese: 雅礼协会; pinyin: Yǎlǐ Xiéhuì), formerly Yale-in-China, is an independent, nonprofit organization based in New Haven, Connecticut which sponsors educational programs in and about China in order to further understanding between Chinese and American people. Founded in 1901 as a Protestant missionary society, Yale-China's work now builds on long-term relationships to support Chinese institutions and Chinese initiatives in the fields of public health and nursing, legal education, English language instruction, and American Studies. The Association works closely with Yale University and is located on the Yale campus, each year sending Yale graduates to teach or work in China, but is not formally connected with it. Yale-China is particularly interested in cultural exchange for Chinese and American students. Publications include a regular newsletter, biennial report, and the annual Yale-China Health Journal.

== History ==
=== Early years ===
The Yale-China Association was first incorporated as the Yale Foreign Missionary Society, and was known informally as Yale-in-China as early as 1913. It was nondenominational from its beginnings and by the 1920s had ceased to be an overtly missionary enterprise. It was re-incorporated in 1934 as a secular organization, the Yale-in-China Association, and in 1975 as the Yale–China Association.

A reflection of the religious fervor sweeping American college campuses at the end of the 19th century, which took form in the Student Volunteer Movement, Yale-China was founded in 1901 as the Yale Foreign Missionary Society by a group of Yale graduates and faculty members committed to establishing a Christian missionary presence overseas. The founders chose China as the focus of their work, in part to honor the memory of a Yale graduate from the class of 1892, Horace Tracy Pitkin, who had worked in China as a missionary and was killed in 1900 during the Boxer Uprising. The city of Changsha in Hunan Province was chosen as the base of operations in China after consultation with other foreign missionaries.

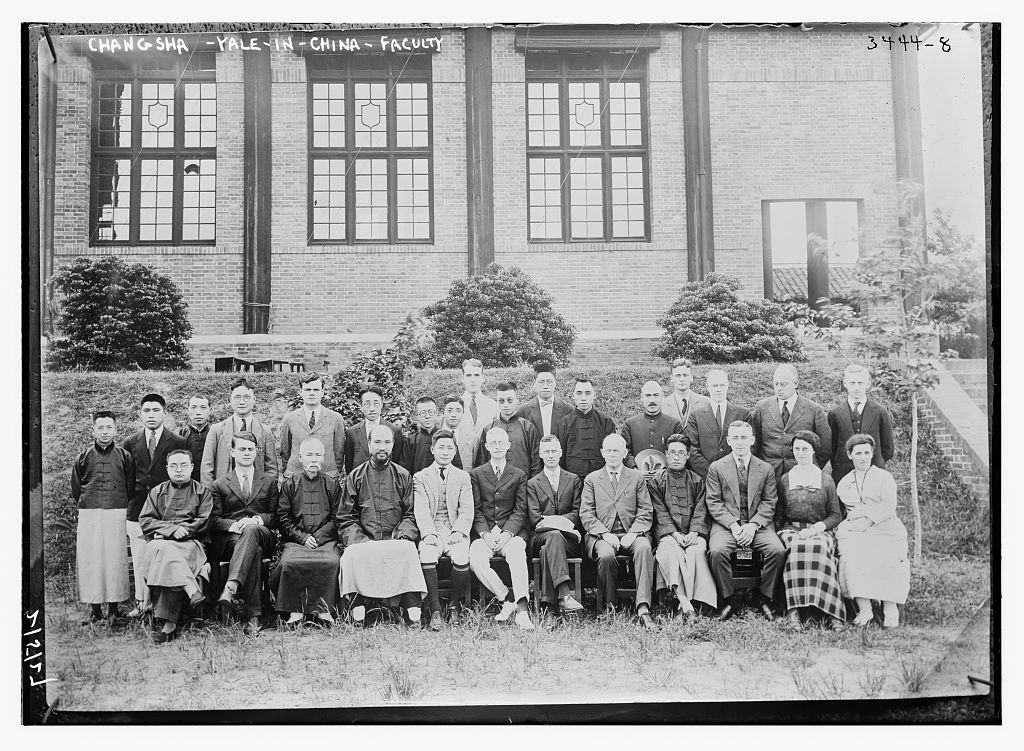
Yale-in-China faculty in Changsha

At the urging of the home office in New Haven as well as other missionaries in China, the Yale Mission early on assumed more of an educational than evangelical function. With the arrival of Dr. Edward H. Hume in 1905, medical education and care became a major focus of the endeavor. The educational compound that began with Dr. Hume's medical clinic eventually grew to comprise a preparatory school, the Yali School in Changsha; the College of Yale-in-China (later moved to Wuhan, where it joined two other missionary colleges to form Huachung University); and the Hsiang-Ya Medical College, Nursing School and Hospital.

Over the years, Hsiang-Ya (a compound of hsiang, denoting Hunan, and ya, denoting Yale-China; transliterated today as Xiangya) developed a reputation for providing the most advanced training in Western medicine in all of central and southern China. More than at other foreign-affiliated institutions, an effort was made early on to bring as many Chinese faculty and administrators on board as possible. By the late 1920s, all major leadership positions were held by Chinese, and Yale-in-China was very much a joint Sino-American enterprise.

Between 1919 and 1920, future Chairman Mao Zedong had several encounters with the school: he edited its student magazine, re-focusing it on "thought reorientation," and operated a bookshop out of its medical college.

=== World War II ===
The war years (1937–45) placed enormous strains on the Yale-in-China institutions, especially the Hsiang-Ya Hospital, which cared for war casualties and refugees. For example, the life of paralyzed Frank Wattendorf was spared at the hospital before he was evacuated.

Many of the Changsha facilities were damaged by invading Japanese troops. Nevertheless, these challenges served to inspire renewed commitment on the part of both American and Chinese faculty and administrators. The Yale-in-China staff who returned to Changsha in September 1945 determined to rebuild the campus and resume their pre-war operations. Within four years, however, a Communist insurgency toppled the Nationalist government and Yale-in-China's future seemed uncertain in the face of growing hostility between the United States and China.

=== Hong Kong ===
By 1951, the new Communist government had taken possession of Yale-in-China's Changsha properties and renamed the Yali School as "Liberation Middle School." Dr. Dwight Rugh, Yale-in-China's last representative in Changsha, spent most of 1950 under house arrest as the only American on campus, and was eventually expelled from China in May 1951. With his departure, the ties between Yale-in-China in New Haven and the institutions in Changsha and Wuhan were broken for nearly 30 years.

Between 1951 and 1954, hostility against the United States on the mainland and turmoil on Nationalist-held Taiwan led to a suspension of Yale-in-China's work within China. Preston Schoyer, who had been a Bachelor in Changsha before the war, worked both formally and informally to develop new programs and maintain ties with old friends. During those years, Yale-in-China devoted its resources to financing the education of Chinese students in the U.S. while looking in Asia for new projects to support. Attention soon focused on a refugee college in the British colony of Hong Kong which had been founded by Ch'ien Mu (1895–1990) and other Chinese intellectuals determined to preserve traditional Chinese learning and values in the face of the Communist victory on the mainland. In early 1954, after a visit to the colony and months of negotiations, Yale-in-China's trustees formally affiliated the organization with New Asia College.

Unlike in Changsha, Yale-in-China's relationship with New Asia College was, by intention, one of support and assistance rather than direct administration. Yale-in-China secured funding from the Ford Foundation and other U.S. foundations to support the development of the college, and also provided fellowships for New Asia faculty to pursue further study in the United States. In 1956, Yale-in-China resumed the practice of sending Bachelors, two recent Yale graduates, to teach English, though now to New Asia College instead of the Yali School.

In the late 1950s, the possibility of founding a university in Hong Kong that would use Chinese as the language of instruction was explored. In 1959, the Council of British Universities selected New Asia, United and Chung Chi colleges to federate and form the new Chinese University of Hong Kong, which was formally inaugurated in 1963 on its Shatin campus. Preston Schoyer played a key role in negotiating New Asia's entrance. Yale-in-China contributed to the new campus by securing funds to construct buildings, including the university health clinic, the Yali Guest House, Friendship Lodge and a student dormitory at New Asia College. Yale-in-China also contributed to the early internationalization of the campus by helping to establish the New Asia - Yale-in-China Chinese Language Centre and the International Asian Studies Programme, which now enroll hundreds of international students every year. Meanwhile, the relationship with New Asia College, where the Yale–China Association (as the organization was renamed in 1975) has maintained a representative office for fifty years, remains a strong one.

=== Return to China ===
By the 1970s, both New Asia College and the Chinese University of Hong Kong had achieved a level of institutional maturity and financial stability that decreased the need for Yale-China's contributions. At the same time, the normalization of diplomatic relations between the U.S. and China presented the possibility of resumed activity on the mainland. In the fall of 1979, Yale-China staff traveled to Changsha to explore opportunities for academic exchange with administrators and faculty at Hunan Medical College, the successor to Hsiang-Ya, and several exchange agreements were concluded that led to the arrival of Yale-China English teachers in September 1980 and exchanges of medical personnel between Yale University and Hunan Medical College. Two English instructors were also sent to Wuhan University the same year and later to Huazhong Normal University.

Despite the geographical continuities, however, the intervening years had brought substantial changes to Chinese higher education and within Yale-China itself. Political sensitivities in China and Yale-China's own evolution determined that any new activity in China would be of a nature substantially different from that of the pre-1949 years. Rather than seeking to resume the joint administration of the former Yale-in-China institutions, the emphasis was placed on shorter-term academic exchanges in the fields of medicine and American Studies and a resumption of the English language instruction program. Throughout the 1980s, Yale-China's medical program brought almost 50 Chinese medical personnel to the U.S. and sent over 40 Americans to China for exchanges of medical knowledge. During the same years, nearly 100 Yale graduates participated in Yale-China's English teaching program in China. Yale-China also continued to send English teachers to the Chinese University of Hong Kong and maintained its involvement with the university's International Asian Studies Program.

The decade of the 1990s brought an expansion of Yale-China's activities into new program areas and affiliations with institutions outside of Yale-China's historical bases in Hong Kong, Changsha and Wuhan. While maintaining its English teaching program, Yale-China initiated projects in environmental protection and pediatric cardiology and facilitated a drama collaboration between New Haven's Long Wharf Theater and the Shanghai People's Art Theater which resulted in a Chinese-language stage production of Amy Tan's Joy Luck Club in 1994. Other areas of expansion have included the fields of American Studies, legal education, public health, nursing, and service in the non-profit sector for China and American students.

== See also ==
- List of Protestant missionary societies in China 1807-1953
- Yale-China Chinese Language Centre
- Yali High School

== References and further reading ==
- Chapman, Nancy E.; Plumb, Jessica C. (2001). The Yale-China Association : A Centennial History. Hong Kong: Chinese University Press. ISBN 9629960184.
- Bevill, James P. (2021). Blackboards and Bomb Shelters : The Perilous Journey of Americans in China During World War II. Atglen, PA: Schiffer Military. ISBN 9780764362644.. Extensive coverage of wartime years.
- Holden, Reuben A. (1964). Yale in China; the Mainland, 1901-1951. New Haven: Yale in China Association.
- Hume, Edward H. (1946). Doctors East, Doctors West; an American Physician's Life in China. New York: W.W. Norton & company.
- Hume, Edward H. and William Winston Pettus (1952). Dauntless Adventurer : The Story of Dr. Winston Pettus. New Haven, Conn.: Yale in China Association.
- Xiao Hong Shen, "Yale's China and China's Yale: Americanizing Higher Education in China, 1900-1927" (PhD Dissertation; New Haven, CT: Yale University, 1993). 363p.
