= Zhong Zhihua =

Chinese engineer and educator

- 钟志华

Vice President of the Chinese Academy of Engineering
- Incumbent
- Assumed office 1 June 2018
- President: Li Xiaohong

President of Tongji University
- In office September 2016 – 25 July 2018
- Preceded by: Pei Gang
- Succeeded by: Chen Jie

President of Hunan University
- In office July 2005 – September 2011
- Preceded by: Gu Shiwen
- Succeeded by: Zhao Yueyu

Personal details
- Born: July 1962 (age 64) Xiangyin County, Hunan, China
- Party: Chinese Communist Party
- Education: Hunan University; Luleå University of Technology; Linköping University

Zhong Zhihua (simplified Chinese: 钟志华; traditional Chinese: 鐘志華; pinyin: Zhōng Zhìhuá; born July 1962) is a Chinese engineer and educator. He served as president of Hunan University from 2005 to 2011, and president of Tongji University from 2016 to 2018. He is a member of the Chinese Academy of Engineering.

Zhong was a member of the 9th National People's Congress and 11th National Committee of the Chinese People's Political Consultative Conference.

== Biography ==
Zhong was born into a family of farming background in Xiangyin County, Hunan. After the Resumption of University Entrance Examination in 1977, he was accepted to Hunan University in September 1978 and graduated in July 1982. Then he studied English and Swedish at Guangzhou Foreign Language College and Beijing Language and Culture University respectively. After graduation, he went to Sweden to study at Luleå University of Technology and Linköping University, he became an assistant professor after graduation.

Zhong returned to China in 1995. He was a doctoral supervisor at Hunan University. In July 2005, he was appointed as president of Hunan University before serving as Dean of the School of Mechanical and Automotive Engineering of Hunan University.

In December 2005, he was elected a fellow of the Chinese Academy of Engineering. In December 2010, he was appointed as director of Chongqing Municipal Science and Technology Commission, rising to chairman in April 2011. On October 27, 2014, he was appointed secretary-general of the Chinese Academy of Engineering.

In September 2016, he was appointed as president of Tongji University.

== Thesis ==
- Finite Element Procedures for Contact-Impact Problems, Oxford University Press, ISBN 978-0-19-856383-9, 1993
- Accurate and efficient shell element with improved reduced integration rules, Structural Engineering and Mechanics, Vol. 8 No. 6, 596-605 1999
- A unified contact algorithms based on the territory concept, computer Method in Applied Mechanics and Engineering, Vol. 130, 1-16
- Contact-Impact Problems-A Review with Bibliography, Applied Mechanics Review, Vol. 47, No. 2, 55-76.
- Contact-impact algorithms on paralleled computers, Nuclear Engineering and Design, Vol. 150, 253-263, 1994
- Lagrange multiplier approach for evaluation of friction in explicit finite element analysis, Communications in Numerical Methods in Engineering, Vol. 10, 249-255, 1994
- Automatic contact searching algorithm for dynamic finite element analysis, International Journal of Computers and Structures, Vol. 52, No. 2, 187-197, 1994
- A bilinear shell element with the cross-reduced integration technique, International Journal for Numerical Methods in Engineering, Vol. 36, 611-625, 1993
- Static contact problems A review, Engineering Computations, Vol. 9, 3-37
- Lagrange multiplier approach for evaluation of friction in explicit finite element analysis, Communications in Numerical Methods in Engineering, Vol. 10, 249-255, 1994
- Static contact problems, Engineering Computation, Vol. 9, 3-37, 1992
- A contact searching algorithm for general 3-D contact-impact problems, Computers and Structures, Vol. 34, No. 2, 327-335, 1990
- A contact searching algorithm for general contact problems, Computers & Structures, Vol. 33, No. 1, 197-209
- High performance algorithms for the solution of general contact-impact problems, Nuclear Engineering and Design, Vol. 138, No. 1, 65-74

Educational offices
Preceded by Gu Shiwen	President of Hunan University; 2005–2011	Succeeded by Zhao Yueyu
Preceded by Pei Gang	President of Tongji University; 2016–2018	Succeeded by Chen Jie
