= Pi Zongshi =

Chinese educator and politician

- 皮宗石
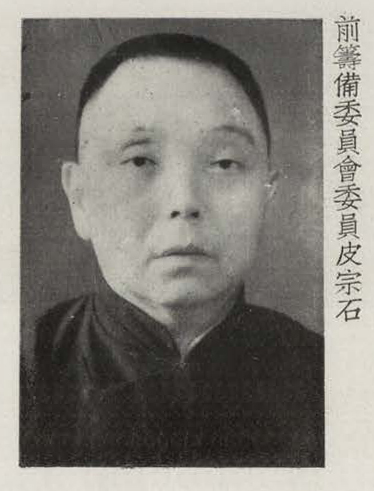
- Pi Zongshi

President of Hunan University
- In office July 1936 – September 1940
- Preceded by: Huang Shiheng
- Succeeded by: Hu Shuhua

Personal details
- Born: August 23, 1887 Changsha, Hunan, Qing China
- Died: 1967 (aged 79–80) Wuhan, Hubei, People's Republic of China
- Party: Tongmenghui
- Spouse: Yang Shujun
- Education: University of Tokyo; University of London

Pi Zongshi (Chinese: 皮宗石; pinyin: Pí Zōngshí; 23 August 1887 – 1967) was a Chinese educator and politician who served as president of Hunan University from July 1936 to September 1940.

== Biography ==
Pi was born into a family of farming background in Changsha, Hunan. In 1903 he went to study in Japan, and graduated from the University of Tokyo. He joined the Tongmenghui in 1905 while he studied at Tokyo. He returned to China in 1902 and that year he established the Republic of China Daily with Zhou Gengsheng, Yang Duanliu, and Ren Kainan. The Beiyang government closed down the newspaper when its articles against Yuan Shikai's restoration of monarchy. In 1916, he studied at the University of London, where he majored in economics.

He returned to China in 1920, that same year, he was recruited by Cai Yuanpei as a professor at Peking University Law School and president of Peking University Library.

He served as dean of Wuhan University's School of Social Sciences from April 1928 to April 1933 and the university's provost from April 1933 to July 1936.

He was president of Hunan University in July 1936, and the Ministry of Education appointed Pi Zongshi as the principal of National Hunan University on January 19 of 1937, and held that office until September 1940.

After the founding of the Communist state, he became a member of the National Committee of the Chinese People's Political Consultative Conference.

He died of stroke in Wuhan, Hubei, in 1967.

== Personal life ==
Pi Zongshi married Yang Shujun (Chinese: 杨淑君) in an arranged marriage.

Educational offices
Preceded by Huang Shiheng	President of Hunan University; 1936–1940	Succeeded by Hu Shuhua
