= Fu Dingyi =

Chinese educator and scholar (1877–1958)

- 符定一
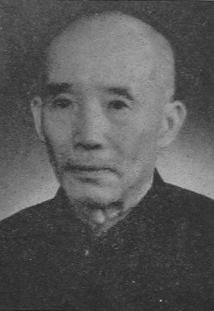
- Fu in 1949

President of Central Research Institute of Culture and History
- In office 1951–1958
- Preceded by: New title
- Succeeded by: Zhang Shizhao

Vice-Minister of Finance of Beiyang Government
- In office June 1926 – March 1927

President of Hunan University
- In office 1914–1915
- Preceded by: Bin Bucheng
- Succeeded by: Li Daishen

President of First High School of Changsha
- In office March 1912 – December 1912
- Preceded by: New title
- Succeeded by: Yin Jiqin

Personal details
- Born: December 12, 1877 Hengshan County, Hunan, Qing Empire
- Died: May 3, 1958 (aged 80) Beijing, People's Republic of China
- Education: Peking University

Fu Dingyi (Chinese: 符定一; pinyin: Fú Dìngyī; 12 December 1877 – 3 May 1958) was a Chinese educator and scholar.

He was a member of the 1st and 2nd National Committee of the Chinese People's Political Consultative Conference and a member of the 1st National People's Congress.

== Names ==
His courtesy name was Yucheng (宇澄) and his art name was Hui'an (悔庵).

== Biography ==
Fu was born in Baiguo Town of Hengshan County, Hunan, on December 12, 1877, during the Qing Empire. He attended Hengyang Normal School. He was accepted to Imperial University of Peking (now Peking University) in 1903 and graduated in 1908, where he majored in English. After the Xinhai Revolution, he returned to Hunan, and served as President of Yuelu Academy and President of Hunan Provincial Education Association. He founded First High School of Changsha in Changsha in 1912, where Mao Zedong was educated. Fu was President of Hunan University from 1914 to 1915. In June 1926, he was appointed Vice-Minister of the Ministry of Finance of Beiyang Government, he resigned in March 1927. Fu went to Yan'an in June 1946 and joined the Communist Party Government. After the establishment of the People's Republic of China (PRC), he became the President of Central Research Institute of Culture and History. Fu died of pneumonia on May 3, 1958, in Beijing.

Cultural offices
New title	President of Central Research Institute of Culture and History; 1951–1958	Succeeded by Zhang Shizhao
Educational offices
Preceded by Bin Bucheng	President of Hunan University; 1914–1915	Succeeded by Li Daichen
New title	President of First High School of Changsha; 19120–1912	Succeeded by Yin Jiqin (尹集馨)
