= Ma Lan (biologist) =

Chinese biologist (born 1958)

- 马兰
- Born: September 1958 (age 67); Shenyang, Liaoning, China
- Education: Shenyang Pharmaceutical University; China Medical University (PRC); University of North Carolina
- Spouse: Pei Gang
- Scientific career
- Fields: Molecular neuropharmacology
- Workplaces: Fudan University

Chinese name
- Traditional Chinese: 馬蘭
- Simplified Chinese: 马兰
Transcriptions
Standard Mandarin
- Hanyu Pinyin: Mǎ Lán

Ma Lan (Chinese: 马兰; born September 1958) is a Chinese biologist and the current chairwoman of the Institute of Brain Science, Fudan University.

== Education ==
Ma was born in Shenyang, Liaoning in September 1958, while her ancestral home in Pingding County, Shanxi. In 1977 she entered Shenyang Pharmaceutical University. In 1984 she obtained her master of immunology degree from China Medical University (PRC). Then she pursued advanced studies in the United States, earning her Ph.D. in biochemistry from the University of North Carolina in 1990. She did post-doctoral research at the University of North Carolina and then Bayer AG between 1991 and 1995.

== Career ==
Ma returned to China in 1995 and that same year became professor at Shanghai Medical College.

In January 2018, she was elected a delegate to the 13th National People's Congress.

== Personal life ==
Ma is married to Pei Gang, who is also a member of the Chinese Academy of Sciences (CAS).

== Honours and awards ==
- November 22, 2019 Member of the Chinese Academy of Sciences (CAS)
