= Huang Shiheng =

Chinese politician and educator

- 黄士衡
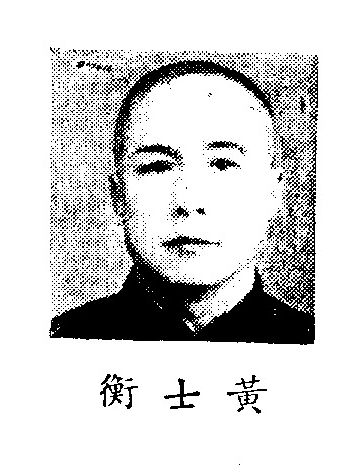

President of Hunan University
- In office December 1935 – July 1937
- Preceded by: Hu Shuhua
- Succeeded by: Pi Zongshi

Personal details
- Born: 1889 Chenzhou, Hunan, Qing China
- Died: 1978 (aged 88–89) Changsha, Hunan, People's Republic of China
- Party: Kuomintang
- Children: 3
- Parent: Huang Ruhu
- Education: University of Iowa; Columbia University

Huang Shiheng (simplified Chinese: 黄士衡; traditional Chinese: 黃士衡; pinyin: Huáng Shìhéng; 1889-12 June 1978) was a Chinese politician and educator who served as president of Hunan University from December 1935 to July 1937.

== Biography ==
Huang was born in Chen County (now Suxian District of Chenzhou), Hunan, in 1889. His father, Huang Ruhu (Chinese: 黄如瑚), was a traditional Chinese intellectual. His brother, Huang Tigui (Chinese: 黄体桂), was a graduate student in Yuelu Academy. Huang attended the First High School of Chenzhou. He secondary studied at the First High School of Changsha and the High School Attached to Hunan Normal University. He received his bachelor's degree from the University of Iowa, and his master's degree from Columbia University.

He returned to China in 1920 and that year became director of History Department at Chengdu Normal School.

In 1923 he became a professor at Hunan Business School (now Hunan University) and became its President in 1924. He was President of Hunan University in December 1935, and held that office until July 1937.

In 1937, he was elected a member of the National Assembly.

In 1940 he was President of Chuanshan Private High School, a position he held until 1942.

After the founding of the Communist State, he taught at Hunan University. He was a researcher in Hunan Normal University in 1953.

He became the Vice-President of Hunan Provincial Research Institute of Culture and History in 1959.

On June 12, 1978, he died of illness in Changsha, Hunan.

== Personal life ==
Huang had one son and two daughters:

- Son: Huang Tianze (Chinese: 黄天泽), a graduate student in the Department of Mechanical Engineering, at Hunan University
- Elder daughter: Huang Qiming (Chinese: 黄启明), a translator
- Young daughter: Huang Qiyu (Chinese: 黄启宇), a teacher at Guangxi Normal University

Educational offices
Previous: Hu Shuhua	President of Hunan University; 1935–1937	Succeeded by Pi Zongshi
