= Fan Lichu =

Chinese structural engineer (1933–2016)

Fan Lichu 范立础
- Born: 8 June 1933; Shanghai, China
- Died: 3 May 2016 (aged 82); Shanghai, China
- Education: Tongji University
- Scientific career
- Fields: Bridge structural engineer

Fan Lichu (Chinese: 范立础; pinyin: Fàn Lìchǔ; 8 June 1933 – 3 May 2016) was a Chinese structural engineer, bridge specialist, and academician of the Chinese Academy of Engineering (CAE).

== Biography ==
Fan was born in Shanghai on 8 June 1933. He obtained a bachelor's degree of bridge and tunnel engineering from Tongji University in 1955. He became a teaching assistant in Tongji University after his graduation. Working under Li Guohao, Fan's research was mainly in the field of bridge structural engineer. He provided aseismic design and analysis for bridges such as Nanpu Bridge, Yangpu Bridge, Donghai Bridge, Sutong Yangtze River Bridge, Jiangyin Yangtze River Bridge, viaduct and overpass in Shanghai.

Fan was elected as an academician of the Chinese Academy of Engineering for his achievements in the aseismic design and analysis for bridges in 2001.

Fan died on 3 May 2016 at the age of 82 in Shanghai.
