= Liu Shiying =

Liu Shiying is the name of:

- Liu Shiying (architect) (柳士英; 1893–1973), Chinese architect
- Liu Shiying (athlete) (刘诗颖; born 1993), Chinese athlete
