= Li Da (philosopher) =

Chinese Marxist philosopher (1890–1960)

- 李达
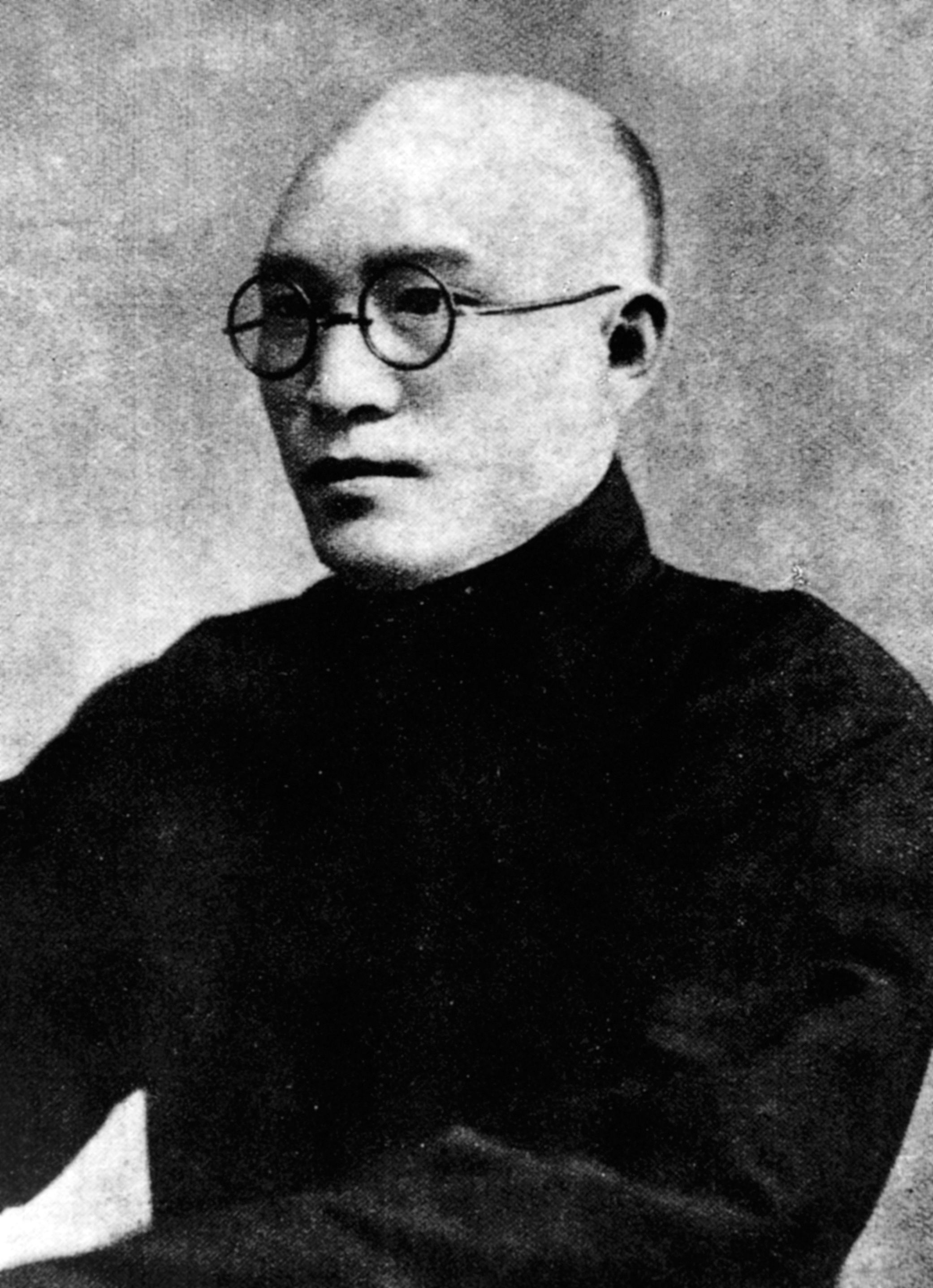

President of Wuhan University
- In office November 1952 – August 1966
- Preceded by: Zhou Gengsheng
- Succeeded by: Zhuang Guo

President of Hunan University
- In office December 1949 – January 1953
- Preceded by: Yi Dingxin
- Succeeded by: Zhu Fan

Personal details
- Born: 2 October 1890 Lingling, Hunan, China
- Died: 24 August 1966 (aged 75) Wuhan, Hubei, China
- Party: Chinese Communist Party
- Spouse: Wang Huiwu (divorced)
- Children: 3, including Li Xintian
- Education: Beijing Normal University; University of Tokyo
- Occupation: Philosopher, writer

Li Da (simplified Chinese: 李达; traditional Chinese: 李達; pinyin: Lǐ Dá; 2 October 1890 – 24 August 1966) was an early Chinese Marxist philosopher and founding member of the Chinese Communist Party. He was heavily involved in bringing Marxism into China by translating Marxist literature into the Chinese language, editing, writing books, and teaching, among other things. He subscribed to and spread Orthodox Marxism throughout his life.

== Early life ==
Li was born to a tenant farmer family in Lingling, Yongzhou in Hunan. His father, though a farmer, had some schooling and had taught in primary schools as well as engaged in business. He witnessed local resistance efforts against imperial Japan in the post-First Sino-Japanese War era including boycotting and Japanese product burning.

== Academic background ==
In 1913, he enrolled as a study abroad government-sponsored student in Japan having passed provincial examinations. He caught tuberculosis and was compelled to return home; in 1917 he again went to Japan to study, taking courses in mining and metallurgy at Tokyo Imperial University. With the Russian Revolution taking place, Li began learning of Marxism–Leninism via Japanese sources, making him one of the earliest Chinese Marxists. He again left Japan in 1918 per renewed political tensions between Japan and the Chinese government of Duan Qirui, although for the third time returned that same year.

He abandoned his studies of science and focused on Marxist theory under the direction of Hajime Kawakami. He soon was translating works of Marxist theory into Chinese, including works by Herman Gorter, Motoyuki Takabatake, and Karl Kautsky. His translations were some of the earliest and was one of the key steps in disseminating Marxism into China.

He did not witness the May Fourth Movement as he was in Japan at the time. He began writing articles of a socialist bent that were both introductory (explaining the goals of socialism), historical (on European socialism before the war) and contemporary (on Chen Duxiu). In 1920, Li traveled back to China (Shanghai).

== Chinese Communist Party founding ==
Li was a founder of the Chinese Communist Party (CCP). During his time at Shanghai, he met with Chen Duxiu and others and founded what was later called the "Shanghai Committee for the Establishment of the Chinese Communist Party". Li helped to found the journal "The Communist" prior to founding of the CCP. The magazine was distributed semi-secretly, using pseudonyms for its writers, printer, distributor, and not disclosing the paper's address. Its editorial office was in Li's residence.

In early June 1921, two Communist International (Comintern) representatives, Vladimir Neumann (commonly known as Nikolsky) and Dutch national Henk Sneevliet, also known as Maring, arrived in Shanghai, and urged Li to call various communist cells in the country to come together for a national-level meeting to form a communist party. Li subsequently called a meeting to form a national party. There were 13 Chinese delegates when the 1st National Congress of the Chinese Communist Party opened on July 23. At the time, there were 57 members of the CCP.

At the founding meeting, Li (along with Li Hanjun) represented Shanghai. Li was elected to the Provisional Central Executive Bureau and appointed head of the Party's Propaganda Department. Li would later state that at this time in his life, his two major tasks were "first, propaganda and second, organizing the workers." Li was tasked with founding the People's Publishing House. He was now fully immersed in translation, editing, and publishing, while also writing articles for workers, exposing them to socialism. He also became a headmaster for a school for girls established by the Party in Shanghai.

By this time, Li had established himself as indispensable in spreading Marxist ideas throughout China. He chaired the 2nd National Congress of the Chinese Communist Party in July 1922, and in late 1922 Mao Zedong invited him to become principal of the Self-Study University in Changsha, as well as editor of the university's journal. Li became close to Mao during this period.

== Departure from the Chinese Communist Party ==
Communist parties across the world, including in China, had debates in the early 1920s about whether it was appropriate to form alliances with bourgeois parties (temporarily); Li was involved in these debates and advocated extreme caution, because although this tactic was rooted in Marxist theory, it was risky and prevented the independence of the Party. In China, propositions were put forth to have the CCP ally with the Guomin Dang to help overthrow the warlords who reigned during this time. Li had a meeting with Chen Duxiu over this subject and while Chen was in favor of the alliance, Li was not. Li would later recall that, upon hearing his view, Chen banged the table, smashed teacups and threatened his expulsion from the Party. Li decided to leave the party over this disagreement in the late 1923. He did not rejoin until 1949.

== Work outside the Party ==
Although he had officially left the Party, he continued to research, publish articles, and cultivate Marxist theory along with referring students to the local Party officials in Hunan. He published his first major work in 1926, Modern Sociology. A summation of lectures Li had given in the previous 3 years, it elucidates the materialist conception of historical and scientific socialism, as well as uncovering the development of Marxism in China. Renewed conflicts between the Kuomintang and CCP such as the Shanghai massacre caused Li to flee first to his native Lingling, then to Wuchang where he barely escaped the execution of revolutionary teachers; he soon was in hiding in Shanghai. Despite the personal risk, he founded the Kunlun Publishing House in 1928 with other revolutionaries, and once again was publishing, translating, and editing.

In 1930, Li was invited to teach at the Shanghai Institute of Law and Politics; in 1931 was made departmental head of the Sociology Department of Jinan University. He suffered a broken collarbone and shoulder after being assaulted by right wing political agitators, and in 1932 was dismissed and went to teach a study group formed around the warlord Feng Yuxiang. In August 1932, he moved to Beiping (Beijing; see Names of Beijing) where he taught at the Institute of Law and Commerce at Beiping University for 5 years as the departmental head of the Department of Economics. This was to be one of Li's most productive periods, where he published numerous books (all on Marxist theory, economics, sociology, etc.) in addition to teaching. One of his most well known texts, Elements of Sociology, was published during this period; it cemented Li's ideological position as an Orthodox Marxist, providing Chinese Marxists with up-to-date Marxist philosophy.

== Later life ==
After the People's Republic of China was established in 1949, Li rejoined the Chinese Communist Party. He was heavily criticized and beaten at the beginning of the Cultural Revolution, and died in 1966. He was posthumously rehabilitated after Mao's death.

== Family ==
Li was married to Wang Huiwu and they had three children. Their eldest daughter, Li Xintian (李心田), died of an illness during the Second Sino-Japanese War. Their second daughter was Li Xinyi (李心怡). Their only son was Li Xintian (李心天), who helped introduce and develop medical psychology in China.

Educational offices
Preceded by Zhou Gengsheng	President of Wuhan University; 1952–1966	Succeeded by Zhuang Guo
Preceded by Yi Dingxin	President of Hunan University; 1949–1953	Succeeded by Zhu Fan
