= Cheng Wenshan =

Chinese academic

- 成文山

President of Hunan University
- In office June 1982 – December 1987
- Preceded by: Zhu Fan
- Succeeded by: Weng Zuze

Personal details
- Born: October 11, 1929 (age 96) Ningxiang, Hunan, China
- Died: July 9, 2008 (aged 78) Changsha, Hunan, China
- Party: Chinese Communist Party
- Education: Wuhan University; Saint-Petersburg State University of Architecture and Civil Engineering

Cheng Wenshan (Chinese: 成文山; pinyin: Chéng Wénshān; 11 October 1929 – 9 July 2008) was a Chinese educator who served as president of Hunan University between 1982 and 1987.

== Biography ==
Cheng was born into a family of farming background in Datunying of Ningxiang County, Hunan, on October 11, 1929. After high school, he studied, then taught, at what is now Wuhan University. He also studied at Beijing Russian Studies College. In May 1960 he earned his doctor's degree from Saint-Petersburg State University of Architecture and Civil Engineering.

He joined the Chinese Communist Party in June 1952.

He joined the Department of Civil Engineering faculty of Hunan University in May 1960 and was promoted to professor in 1983. In March 1981 he was appointed vice-president of Hunan University. After this office was terminated in February 1982, he became president of Hunan University, serving until August 1987.

In 2006, he received his Honorary Doctoral Degree from Chiba University.

On July 9, 2008, he died of illness in Changsha, Hunan.

Educational offices
Preceded by Zhu Fan	President of Hunan University; 1982–1987	Succeeded by Weng Zuze
