= Tongji University =

Public university in Shanghai, China

Coordinates: 31.2827°N 121.5066°E

- 同济大学
- Motto: 同舟共济
- Type: National, Public
- Established: October 1, 1907; 119 years ago
- Affiliations: Excellence League
- President: Zheng Qinghua
- Faculty: 2,815
- Students: 37,492
- Undergraduates: 18,956
- Postgraduates: 17,871
- Location: Shanghai, China
- Campus: Siping Road Campus (1239 Siping Road, Yangpu District, Shanghai, 200092) Jiading Campus (4800 Caoan Road, Jiading District, Shanghai, 201804)
- Colors
- Website: www.tongji.edu.cn

Chinese name
- Simplified Chinese: 同济大学
- Traditional Chinese: 同濟大學
Transcriptions
Standard Mandarin
- Hanyu Pinyin: Tóngjì Dàxué

Tongji University is a public university located in Shanghai, China. It is affiliated with the Ministry of Education of China. The university is part of Project 211, Project 985, and the Double First-Class Construction.

Established in 1907 by German physicians in Shanghai, the university now has a faculty of more than 2,815 scholars, including 27 members from the Chinese Academy of Sciences and the Chinese Academy of Engineering. Currently, Tongji University owns 29 colleges, 11 affiliated hospitals, and 7 affiliated primary and secondary schools.

== History ==
The history of Tongji University can be traced back to 1907 when the German Medical School for the Chinese (Deutsche Medizinschule für Chinesen in Shanghai) in Shanghai was founded by the German government together with the German physicians Erich Paulun, Oscar von Schab and Paul Krieg. The school was affiliated with the Tongji-Hospital the German physicians had established in Shanghai on the initiative of Paulun. The name Tongji, which is a phonetic approximation in Shanghainese of German deutsche ("German"), suggests cooperating by riding the same boat. The school was expanded to include engineering in its programs and got its new name as German Medical and Engineering School for the Chinese in Shanghai in 1912. It was formally established as a Chinese university under the name of Tongji University in 1923/1924 and was renamed as National Tongji University in 1927. During the Second Sino-Japanese War (1937–1945), the university campus was moved from Shanghai first to Zhejiang Province, then to Jiangxi Province and Yunnan Province and later to Sichuan Province. It was eventually moved back to Shanghai in 1946. (Note: With a few exceptions, the German members of the Faculty of Medicine stayed behind in Shanghai and established in 1940 in the International Settlement the Shanghai German Medical Academy (Deutsche medizinische Akademie Shanghai; alternative spelling Schanghai). The school functioned at 82 Tongfu Road (later Shimenyi Road) and at #10, 100 Changshu Road, continuing medical and educational activities throughout the war. Upon the return of the National Tongji University to Shanghai, the Academy, with all its students, was re-integrated in the Faculty of Medicine. See (History of) #10, 100 Changshu Road (Shanghai) Archived 2007-09-30 at the Wayback Machine, in Chinese.)

Tongji became one of the first universities authorized by the State Council to establish a graduate school. It became a member of the Project 211, which provided universities with substantial government fund. In 1995, the university became one to be jointly supported by the State Education Commission and the Shanghai Municipal Government. In 1996 the university merged with Shanghai Institute of Urban Construction and Shanghai Institute of Building Materials. The merger was acknowledged by the State Council as "Tongji Model" in the system renovation of higher institutions in China. In April 2000, the expanded Tongji merged again with Shanghai Railway University. The university is now a comprehensive university which offers a wide range of programs in science, engineering, medicine, arts, law, economics and management.

=== Timeline ===
- August 2026 - Announced the cancellation of its long-term employment system, causing controversy.
- November 2010 - Signed a cooperation agreement with Instituto Superior Técnico making IST the Portuguese Campus of Tongji University
- July 2005 - Signed a cooperation agreement with Politecnico di Milano and Politecnico di Torino concerning the development of Sino-Italian University Campus in Shanghai and establishment of a Sino-Italian House, one year later a dual bachelor's degree project in engineering, called PoliTong, was launched
- 2002 - Listed in Project 985
- April 2000 - Merged with Shanghai Railway University (a merge between Shanghai Railway College and Shanghai Railway Medical College in May 1995)
- August 1996 - Merged with Shanghai Institute of Urban Construction and Shanghai Institute of Building Materials
- November 1995 - Listed in Project 211
- October 1995 - Declared to be jointly built by the former State Education Commission and the Shanghai Municipal Government
- December 1978 - Upon consent by the State Council, resumed connection with Germany and became the window of the cultural, technology and science exchanges between China and Germany
- February 1972 - Tongji University merged with the Marine Geology Department of East China Normal University
- 1952 - The Departments of Mathematics, Physics and Chemistry in College of Science merged into Fudan University, the Departments of Machinery, Electrical Engineering and Ship Manufacture merged into Shanghai Jiaotong University. In the meanwhile, Tongji University merged the Civil Engineering Department and School of Architecture from Saint John's University, Shanghai and several other universities.
- 1951 - The Department of Biology in College of Science merged into East China Normal University, the Medical School and the Department of Survey in College of Engineering moved to Wuhan, Hubei Province
- September 1949 - College of Literature and Arts, College of Law merged into Fudan University
- June 1949 - Tongji University was taken over by Shanghai Military Control Commission
- August 1946 - College of Science expanded as College of Literature and Science moved back to Shanghai
- April 1946 - Moved back to Shanghai
- 1945 - Established the College of Law
- October 1940 - Moved Lizhuang in Yibin, Sichuan Province
- Winter 1938 - Moved to Kunming, Yunnan Province
- September 1937 - Moved to the south of China due to the Second Sino-Japanese War
- August 1927 - Renamed as National Tongji University
- May 20, 1924 - Approved by the government to be one of the first national universities in China.
- March 1922 - Renamed as Tongji Medical and Engineering University
- October 1907 - Established as Tongji German Medical School

== Present ==
The university now registers over 50,000 students at all levels from certificate and diploma courses to Bachelor's Degrees, Master's, Ph.D. programs and post doctoral attachments. There are over 4,200 academic staff for teaching and/or research, among whom there are 6 Members of Chinese Academy of Sciences, 7 Members of Chinese Academy of Engineering, over 530 professors and 1,300 associate professors. The university offers diverse courses in its 81 Bachelor's degrees, 151 Masters, 58 PhD programs and 13 post doctoral mobile stations. Tongji University is particularly famous for its Civil Engineering and Architecture programs. Its Civil Engineering, Architecture programs and Transportation Engineering are ranked Top 1 in P.R. China and its architecture program is by far the most difficult to gain entry into. As one of the state leading centers for scientific research, the university has 5 state key laboratories and engineering research centers.

The university is active in promoting cooperation and exchanges with other countries. It has established links with Australia, Austria, Canada, Finland, France, Germany, Japan, Spain, Switzerland, UK and USA in the fields of education, science, technology and economics. A number of international joint programs have been established between the university and its counterparts in other countries in recent years. In 2006, the university enrolled 1,829 international students.

== Anniversary Day ==
On June 3, 1907, German Medical School was opened in Shanghai. On October 1 of the same year, a ceremony was held. The Anniversary Day was initially set to May 18, on which day in 1924 the Wusong campus was opened. In 1925 and 1926, ceremonies were held on May 18. On the staff meeting on January 19, 1931, the Anniversary Day of National Tongji University was decided to be postponed to May 20, two days after the national mourn with half-mast over the death of Mr. Chen Yingshi (Chen Qimei), a politician. Tongji celebrates the Anniversary Day on May 20 since then.

== Campus ==
Tongji University is titled the State-level Garden Unit for Excellent Afforestation. lts five campuses are located in the municipal city of Shanghai, covering an area of 2,460,000 m^{2}. The Siping Campus is situated on Siping Road; the West Campus on Zhennan Road; the North Campus on Gonghexing Road; the East Campus on Wudong Road and the Jiading Campus is located in Shanghai International Automobile City in Anting, Jiading District. In the year 2009, the East Campus was sold to Shanghai University of Finance and Economics.

- Siping Campus (Main campus)
- West Campus
- North Campus
- Jiading Campus
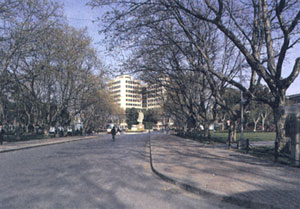
The entrance part of Siping Campus

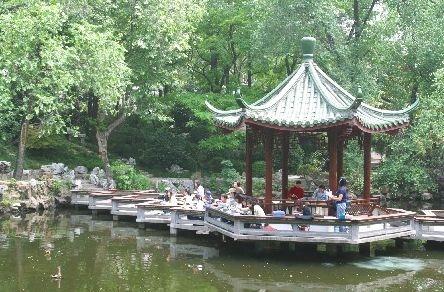
The Sanhao Wood Restaurant (三好坞) in the Siping Campus

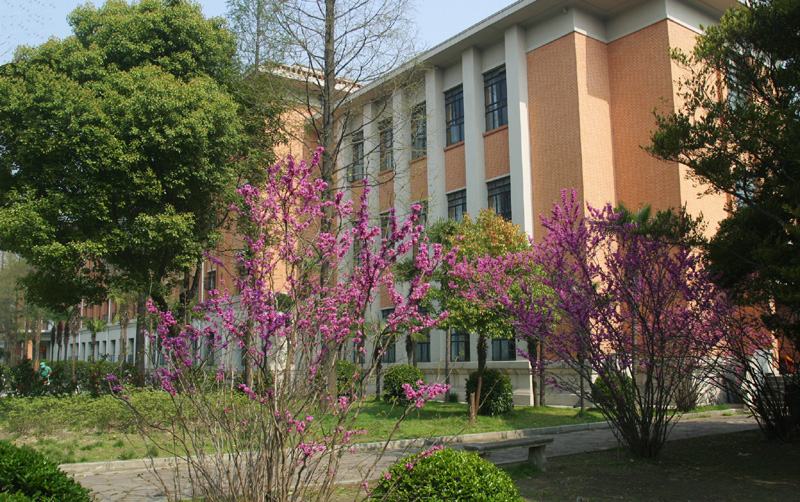
The north teaching building (北楼) in Siping Campus

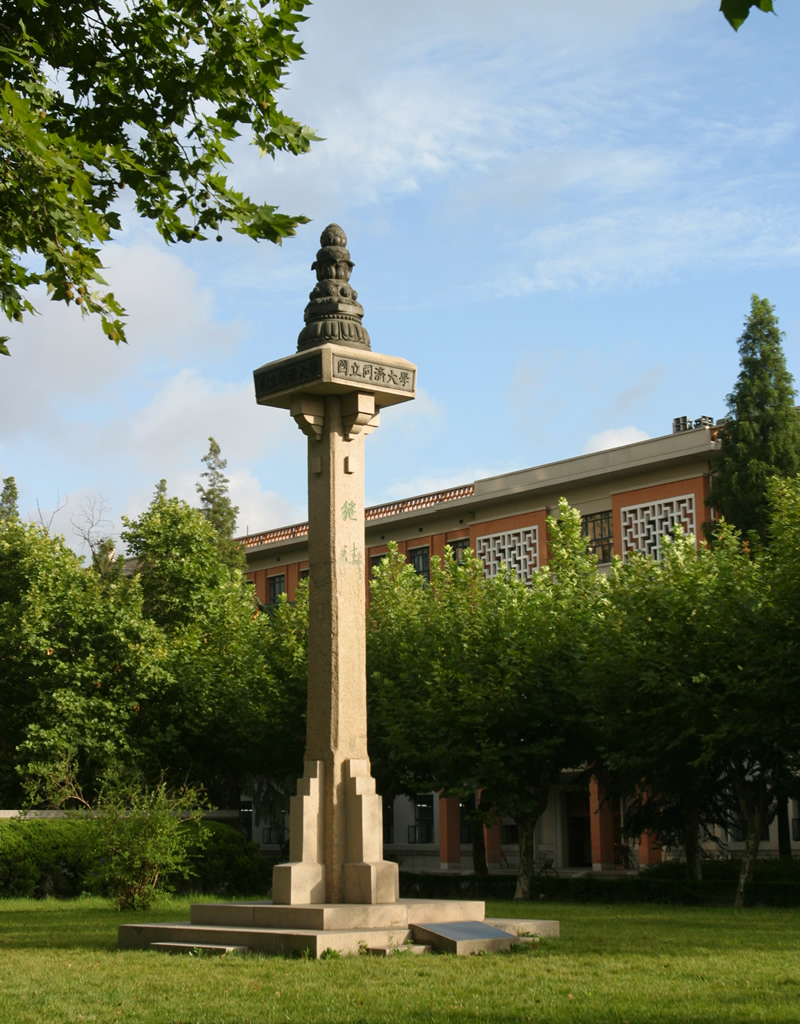
The obelisk (国立柱) in Siping Campus

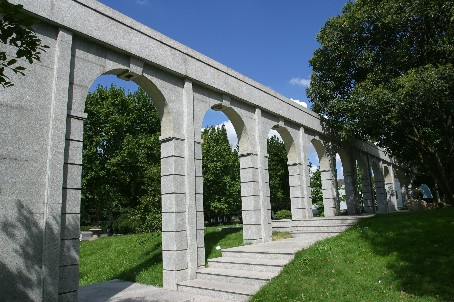
The Qianqiu Garden (千秋园) in Siping Campus

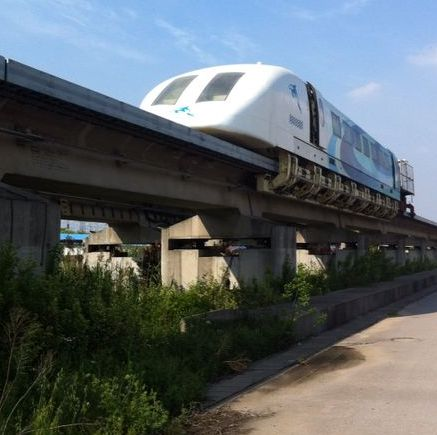
Maglev

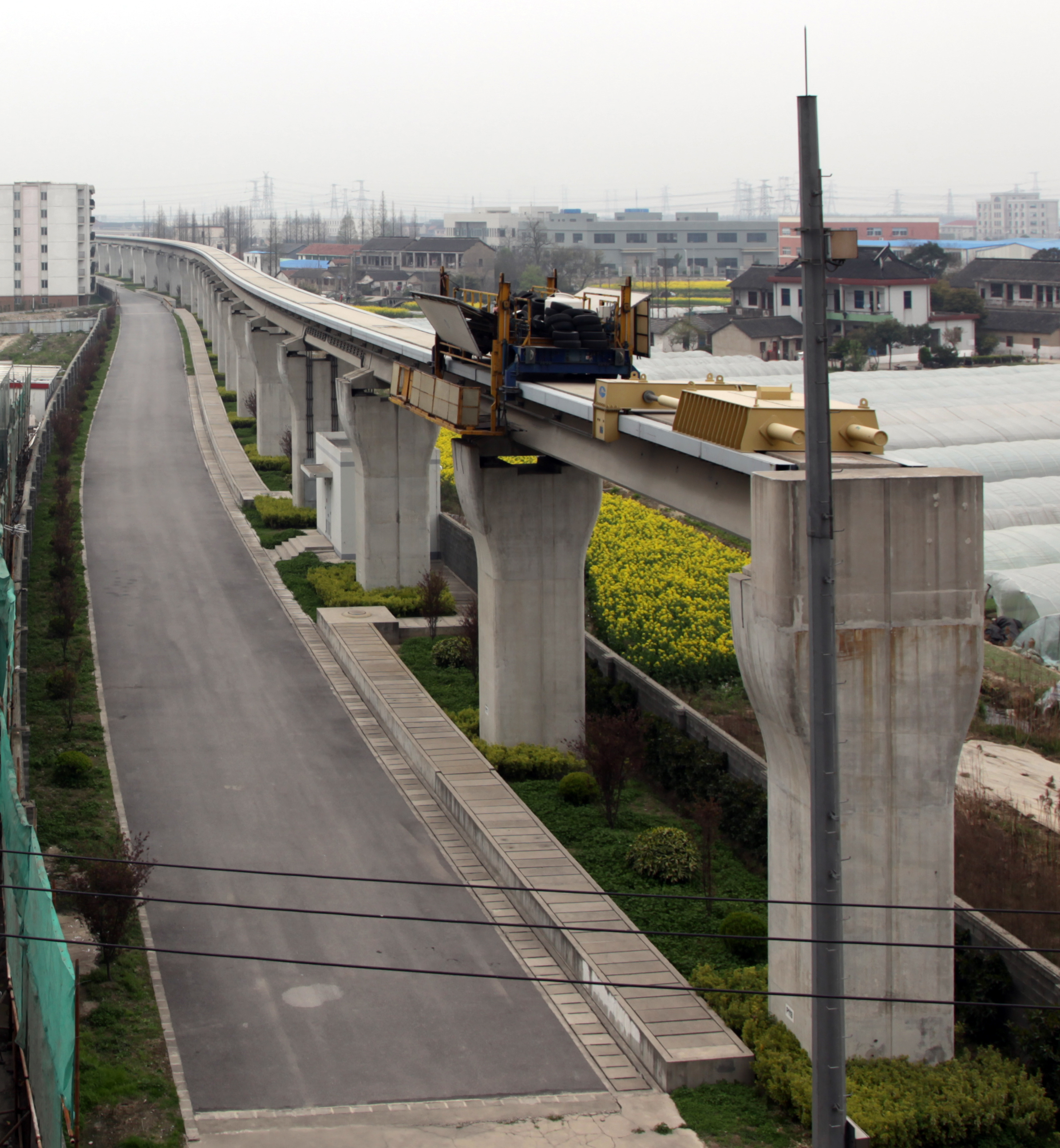
Maglev Test track

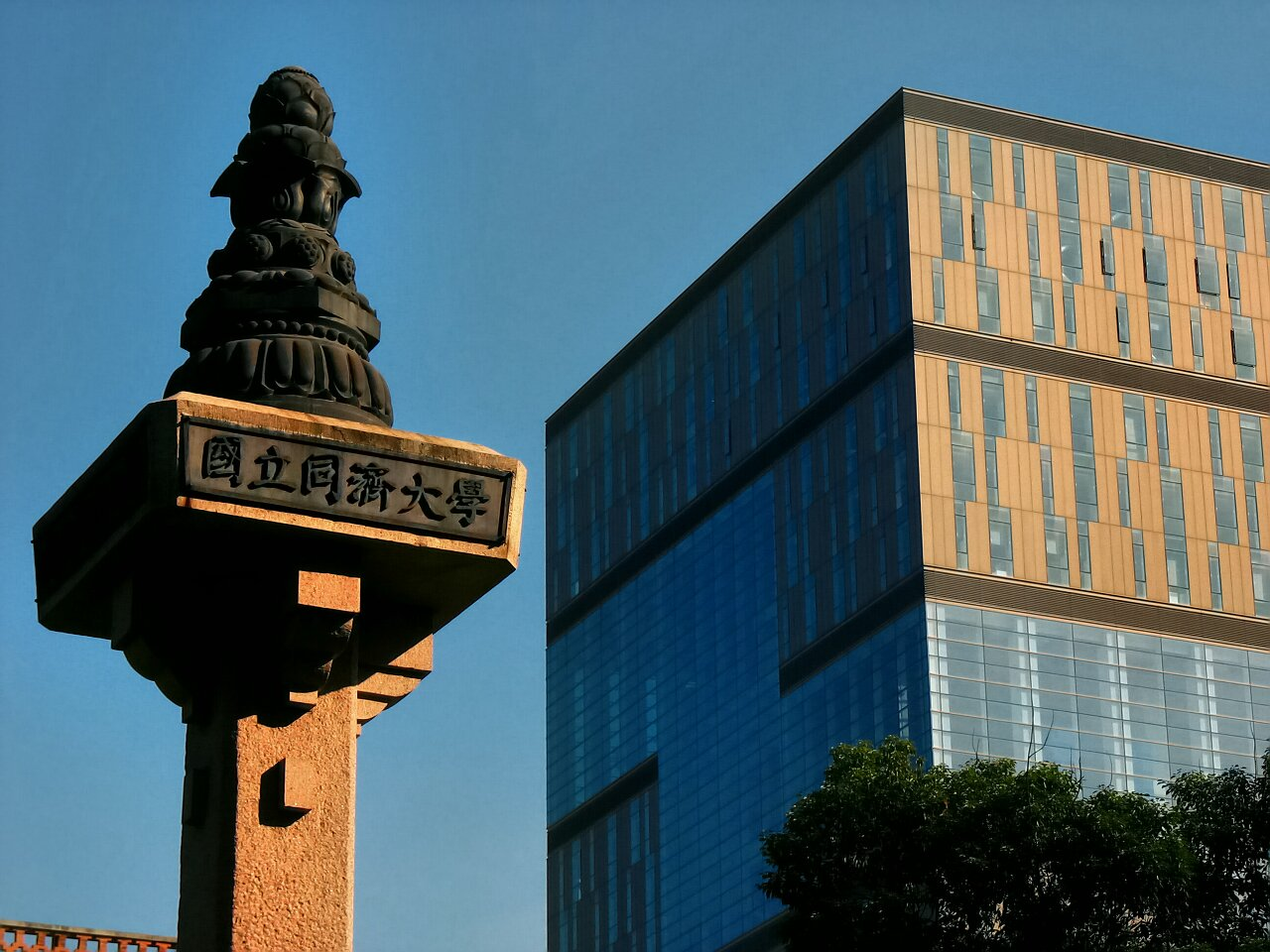
The obelisk

== Academics ==
=== Key provincial-level and ministerial-level research centers ===
- Information and Technology Research Center of Civil Engineering of the State Ministry of Education
- Shanghai Engineering Research Center of Constriction Robot

=== State key disciplines ===
- Marine Geology
- Structural Engineering
- Engineering Mechanics
- Bridge and Tunnel Engineering
- Material Science
- Road and Railway Engineering
- Urban Planning and Design
- Traffic and Transportation Planning and Management
- Environmental Engineering
- Geo-technical Engineering

=== Members of the Chinese Academy of Sciences ===
- Sun Jun (孙钧)
- Ma Zaitian (马在田)
- Wang Pinxian
- Yao Xi (姚熹)
- Zheng Shiling (郑时龄)
- Chang Qing (常青)
- Zhou Xingming (周兴铭)
- Chen Yihan (陈义汉)
- Pei Gang
- Shaorong Gao (高绍荣)

=== Members of the Chinese Academy of Engineering ===
- Haifan (项海帆)
- Li Tongbao (李同保)
- Guo Chongqing (郭重庆)
- Zhiqiang Wu (吴志强)
- Dai Fudong
- Fan Lichu
- Lu Yaoru (卢耀如)
- Shen Zuyan
- Zhong Zhihua
- Chen Jie

=== Partnerships ===
Tongji has a strategic partnership with Technische Universität Darmstadt, Technische Universität Graz and Ecole des Ponts ParisTech.

== Rankings and reputation ==
University rankings
QS National	General	8
THE National	General	11
QS Asia (Asia version)	General	43
THE Asia (Asia version)	General	22
ARWU World	Research	101–150
QS World	General	146
THE World	General	124
USNWR World	General	110

As of 2026, Tongji features in the top 150th global universities as ranked by the Academic Ranking of World Universities, the QS World University Rankings, the Times Higher Education World University Rankings and the U.S. News & World Report Best Global Universities Ranking.

Tongji University was ranked #3 in Shanghai, #9 nationwide and #131 globally in 2025 in terms of aggregate performance from the three most widely observed university rankings (THE+ARWU+QS) as reported by the Aggregate Ranking of Top Universities.

The U.S. News & World Report Best Global Universities Ranking 2026 placed Tongji #110 worldwide, #21 in Asia, #11 in China and #3 in Shanghai.

Tongji graduates are highly desired in China and worldwide. In 2017, its Graduate Employability rankings placed at #101 in the world in the QS Graduate Employability Rankings. Tongji University is regarded as one of the most reputable Chinese universities by the Times Higher Education World Reputation Rankings where it ranked # 151 globally.

=== Subject Rankings ===
==== College of Civil Engineering ====
The College of Civil Engineering is considered the best in the world according to several widely cited international rankings, including Shanghai Ranking, U.S. News Rankings, URAP ranking and NTU Ranking.

==== Engineering ====
As of 2026, the U.S. News & World Report Best Global University Ranking ranks Tongji University at 7th in engineering among Best Global Universities.

==== Architecture ====
Tongji's College of Architecture and Urban Planning is home to one of the best architecture programs in the world. As of 2022, Tongji University was ranked the best university in the world in "architecture" by the University Ranking by Academic Performance and ranked as the number 12 architecture school worldwide in the QS World University Rankings and the top overall architecture program in China according to China's University and College Admission System (CACUS).

Tongji University has a major role in designing and planning new cities in China.

==== Arts and Design ====
The School of Design and Innovation was ranked 10th among art and design schools worldwide in 2023, and the top in Asia, according to QS.

== Presidents ==
Erich Paulun

- Erich Paulun (1907-1909)
- Oscar von Schab (福沙伯) (1909-1917)
- Berrens (贝伦子) (1912-1919&1921-1927)
- Shen Enfu (沈恩孚) (1917-1923) (acting)
- Yuan Xitao (袁希涛) (1923-1927) (acting)
- Ruan Shangjie (阮尚介) (1917-1927)
- Zhang Zhongsu (张仲苏) (1927-1929)
- Zhang Qun (March 1929-June 1929)
- Hu Shuhua (1929-1932)
- Weng Zhilong (翁之龙) (1932-1939)
- Zhao Shiqing (赵士卿) (1939-1940)
- Zhou Junshi (周均时) (1940-1942)
- Ding Wenyuan (丁文渊) (1942-1944)
- Xu Songming (徐诵明) (1944-1946)
- Dong Xifan (董洗凡) (1946-1947)
- Ding Wenyuan (丁文渊) (1947-1948)
- Xia Jianbai (夏坚白) (1948-1952)
- Xue Shangshi (薛尚实) (January 1953-July 1959)
- Wang Tao (王涛) (1959-1977)
- Li Guohao (October 1977-April 1984)
- Jiang Jingbo (江景波) (April 1984-February 1989)
- Gao Tingyao (高廷耀) (February 1989-February 1995)
- Wu Qidi (February 1995-July 2003)
- Wan Gang (July 2003-August 2007)
- Pei Gang (August 2007-September 2016)
- Zhong Zhihua (September 2016-July 2018)
- Chen Jie (July 2018-February 2023)
- Zheng Qinghua (郑庆华) (February 2023-present)

== Notable alumni ==
Some noted alumni of Tongji University are:

- Li Guohao, Former President of Tongji University, World Famous Bridge Engineering Expert
- Wang Shu, 2012 Pritzker Prize recipient
- Qiao Shi, Former Chairman of the Standing Committee of the National People's Congress, PRC
- Li Linsi, China's Mahatma Gandhi, diplomatic consultant to Chiang Kai-shek
- Qian Xinzhong, Minister of Health of the People's Republic of China
- Tang Dengjie, Minister of Civil Affairs of the People's Republic of China
- Qiu Fazu, Surgeon
- Wu Mengchao, Surgeon, Winner of the State Preeminent Science and Technology Award of China (2005)
- Pan Yunhe, Computer Scientist, Vice Chairman of the Chinese Academy of Engineering
- Bei Shizhang, Physiologist, "Father of Chinese Biophysics"
- Wan Gang, Minister of Science and Technology of the People's Republic of China
- Andy Xie, Economist
- Wang Guangtao, Minister of Construction of the People's Republic of China
- Kwong-Chai Chu (Zhu Guangcai), Hydraulic Engineer
- Shi Xiaolin, Communist Party Secretary of Chengdu
- Luo Xiaowei, Founder of the Architectural History and Theory department at Tongji University

== See also ==
- Tongji Medical College
