= Zhao Yueyu =

Chinese writer

- 赵跃宇

President of Guangxi University
- Incumbent
- Assumed office February 2017
- Preceded by: Zhao Yanlin

President of Hunan University
- In office 15 September 2011 – January 2016
- Preceded by: Zhong Zhihua
- Succeeded by: Duan Xianzhong

Personal details
- Born: September 1961 (age 65) Nan County, Hunan, China
- Party: Chinese Communist Party
- Education: Xiangtan University; Beijing Institute of Technology; Hunan University

Zhao Yueyu (simplified Chinese: 赵跃宇; traditional Chinese: 趙躍宇; pinyin: Zhào Yuèyǔ; born September 1961) is a Chinese educator who served as president of Guangxi University since February 2017. Previously he served as president of Hunan University from September 2011 to January 2016.

Zhao was an executive director of the 8th and 9th Chinese Society of Theoretical and Applied Mechanics.

== Biography ==
Zhao was born and raised in Yiyang, Hunan. He received his Bachelor of Solid Mechanics from Xiangtan University in June 1983, Master of General Mechanics from Beijing Institute of Technology in June 1987, and Doctor of Structural Engineering from Hunan University in June 1990.

In 1996 he was promoted to become a professor at Hunan University. In 2001 he became the vice-president of Hunan University, rising to president in September 2011. By late 2011, he was elected vice-chairman of Hunan Association for Science and Technology.

In February 2017, he was appointed president of Guangxi University, replacing Zhao Yanlin (赵艳林).

== Thesis ==
- Non-linear planar dynamics of suspended cables investigated by the continuation method, Engineering Structures, 2007, 29: 1135-1144.
- Nonlinear interactions and chaotic dynamics of suspended cables with three-to- one internal resonances, International Journal of Solids and Structures, 2006, 4: 7800-7819.
- On the symmetric modal interaction of the suspended cable: Three-to-one internal resonance, Journal of Sound and Vibration. 2006, 294: 1073-1093.
- Nonlinear dynamic analysis of the two-dimensional simplified model of an elastic cable, Journal of Sound and Vibration. 2002, 255: 43-59.
- Large amplitude motion mechanism and non-planar vibration character of stay cables subject to the support motions, Journal of Sound and Vibration. 2009, 327(1-2): 121-133.
- Multiple internal resonances and non-planar dynamics of shallow suspended cable to the harmonic excitation, Journal of Sound and Vibration. 2009, 319: 1-14.
- Rega G. Multimode dynamics and out-of-plane drift in suspended cable using the kinematically condensed model, Journal of Vibration and Acoustics, ASME. 2009, 131(6): 1008-1-9.
- In-plane free vibration analysis of cable–arch structure, Journal of Sound and Vibration. 2008, 312(3): 363-379.
- The nonlinear dynamic behaviors of viscoelastic shallow arches, Applied Mathematics and Mechanics. 2009, 30(6): 771-779.
- The global bifurcation and chaos for the coupling between longitudinal and transverse vibrations of a plate in large overall motions, Acta Mechanica Solid Sinica. 1998, 10(4): 309-315.

Educational offices
Preceded by Zhong Zhihua (钟志华)	President of Hunan University; 2011–2016	Succeeded by Duan Xianzhong
Preceded by Zhao Yanlin	President of Guangxi University; 2017–	Incumbent
