= Bin Bucheng =

- 宾步程
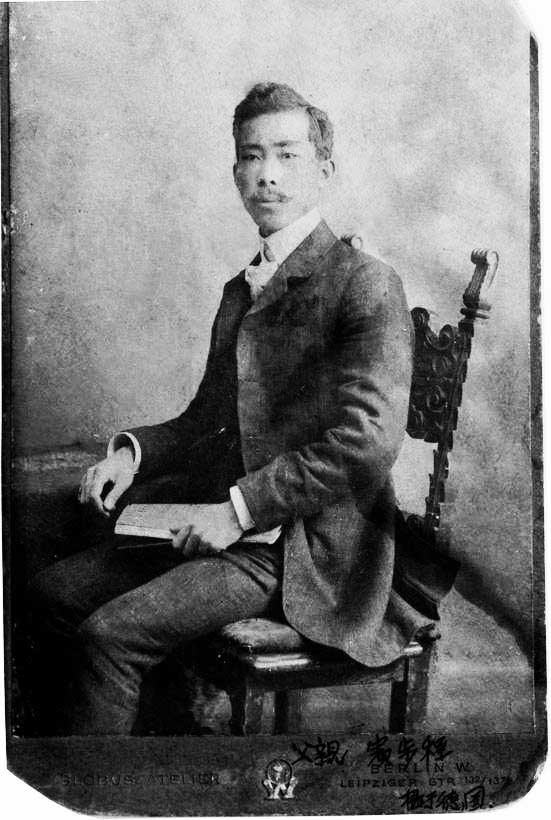
- Bin Bucheng

President of Hunan Public Polytechnic School
- In office 1913–1925
- Preceded by: Liu Zongxiang
- Succeeded by: Fu Dingyi

Personal details
- Born: Bin Xiaocong; January 12, 1880 Dong'an County, Hunan, Qing Empire
- Died: December 27, 1943 (aged 63) Changsha, Hunan, Republic of China
- Party: Tongmenghui
- Education: Technische Universität Berlin

Bin Bucheng (simplified Chinese: 宾步程; traditional Chinese: 賓步程; pinyin: Bīn Bùchéng; 12 January 1880 – 27 December 1943) was a Chinese politician and educator. He became the president of Hunan University in 1913, and served until 1923.

== Names ==
His style name was Min'gai (敏陔), and his art name was Yilu (艺庐).

== Biography ==
Bin was born Bin Xiaocong (Chinese: 宾孝聪) in Dong'an County, Hunan, on January 12, 1880, during the Qing Empire. He attended Lianghu Academy (Chinese: 两湖书院) and Jiangbin School (Chinese: 将弁学堂). In 1900, the Qing government sent him to Germany to study at Technische Hochschule Berlin (today Technische Universität Berlin), majoring in mechanical engineering. He joined the Tongmenghui when he was in Berlin.

He returned to China in 1908, he worked as an engineer at Guangdong-Hubei Railway Bureau, and later became the factory director of Jinling Arsenal. In 1913, he was appointed as president of Hunan University, and held that office until 1923. Hunan University's motto, "Seeking Truth from Facts and Daring to be Pioneers" (Chinese: 实事求是敢为人先), was founded by Bin Bucheng.

He founded Pili Pao (Chinese: 霹雳报) in 1932. In January 1938, he served as president of Guomin Daily (Chinese: 国民日报).

During the Second Sino-Japanese War, he was a member of the Hunan government and the director of Hunan Refugee Relief Agency.

He founded Seventh Hunan Provincial High School and Mingxian Girls' School in 1942.

On December 27, 1943, he died of illness in Changsha, Hunan.

Educational offices
| Preceded by Liu Zongxiang | President of Hunan Public Polytechnic School; 1913–1923 | Succeeded by Fu Dingyi |
