= Weng Zuze =

Chinese electrical engineer and academic

- 翁祖泽

President of Hunan University
- In office December 1987 – July 1993
- Preceded by: Cheng Wenshan
- Succeeded by: Yu Ruqin

Personal details
- Born: January 1941 (age 85) Shanghai, China
- Party: Jiusan Society
- Education: Harbin Institute of Technology

Weng Zuze (simplified Chinese: 翁祖泽; traditional Chinese: 翁祖澤; pinyin: Wēng Zǔzé; born January 1941) is a Chinese electrical engineer and academic. He served as president of Hunan University from December 1987 to July 1993. He is a member of the Jiusan Society.

== Biography ==
Weng was born and raised in Shanghai. In 1964 he graduated from Harbin Institute of Technology, where he majored in electrical engineering. Weng joined the chemical engineering faculty of Hunan University in 1978 and was promoted to professor in June 1988. He was a visiting scholar at the University of British Columbia from January 1980 to 1982.

He served as vice-president of Hunan University from December 1985 to December 1987 and the university's president from December 1987 to July 1993.

In December 1989, he joined the Jiusan Society.

Educational offices
| Preceded by Cheng Wenshan | President of Hunan University; 1987–1993 | Succeeded by Yu Ruqin |
