= Wang Huiwu =

Chinese social reformer

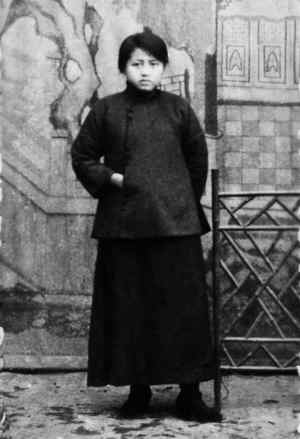
- Born: May 1898; Jiaxing, Zhejiang, China
- Died: 20 October 1993 (aged 95); Beijing, China
- Spouse: Li Da (divorced)
- Children: three, including Li Xintian
- Parent: Wang Yanchen (father)

Wang Huiwu (Chinese: 王会悟; May 1898 – 20 October 1993) was a social reformer, a Chinese Communist Party (CCP) women's organizer (in the early years), as well as a proponent of women's emancipation. She ran the first Communist-sponsored journal which was written and edited mostly by women. Her husband was Li Da (1890–1966) one of the founders of CCP and a propagator of Marxist Philosophy.

== Early life ==
Wang was born in Jiaxing County, Zhejiang, China, to a school teacher and his illiterate wife. Her father, Wang Yanchen (who owned the local school), provided her initial education. Her father's untimely death put the family in a penurious situation. However, she continued with her studies at the Jiaxing Women's Normal School and the Hujun Academy for Girls, managed by Christian Missionaries, where she learned English and became a Christian. At Hujun, she participated in student protests against the Paris Peace Conference. It was at Hujun while she became fluent in English that she imbibed the iconoclasm of the May Fourth Movement, which inspired her to spearhead the movement for women's emancipation.

After graduation, she moved to Shanghai where her cousin, Shen Yanbing, later known as Mao Dun (in later years one of the well known writers of China), introduced Wang to Marxists. She married Li Da, a Marxist philosopher and feminist, who had returned from Japan after studies, in autumn of 1920; they shared an apartment with Chen Duxiu and his wife, Gao Junman. Wang and Li moved to Changsha where they had a son (born 1924) and daughter (born 1925). After 1927, they lived in Shanghai and in Beijing, and in July 1937 during the Japanese invasion of northern China, they escaped and lived in Guilin and Guiyang, before eventually arriving in Chongqing, the wartime capital of Nationalist China. They later divorced.

== Career ==
With Junman, Wang was the first woman activist in Shanghai's Communist organization. She and her husband who had a common interest in the women's emancipation (both were known as May Fourth intellectuals) and together published a number of articles on the subject during post-World War I period in popular periodicals. In 1921, she participated in the First Communist Party of the China National Congress, working as a guard. Wang established the Shanghai Commoners' (Pingmin) Girls' School in 1922, (which attracted Ding Ling, Qian Xijun, Wang Jianhong, and Wang Yizhi). She was the editor of Women's Voice (Funü Sheng; 妇女声), a bimonthly periodical; which pioneered writings on politics by women. She also strongly supported the movement for birth control in spite of much male opposition.

In 1949, she moved to Beijing following establishment of the PRC and worked for the Legal Committee of the central government. She also participated in the 60th anniversary of the founding of CCP.

== Publications ==
Wang's earliest publication on Women's emancipation was entitled "Chinese Woman Question: Liberation from a Trap" which was published in 1919 in the Young China; the theme of this book was on early traditional marriage custom all related to the dominant role of the husband in every aspect of his wife's life.

In 1949, when Wang went to Beijing, she published many essays reminiscing the founding of the CCP.

== Family ==
Wang and her husband Li Da had three children. Their eldest daughter, Li Xintián (李心田), died of an illness during the Second Sino-Japanese War. The second daughter was Li Xinyi (李心怡). Their only son was Li Xintian (李心天), a founder of medical psychology in China.

== Death and legacy ==
In her final years, Wang was described as "frail and sickly", a result of years of hard labour. Wang died on 20 October 1993, at her residence in Beijing, aged 96. The cause of death was sickness coupled with old age. A memorial in honour of Wang's contribution to the cause of women in China was established at Wuzhen, a World Heritage town, in northern Zhejiang Province.
