= Jiaxing Women's Normal School =

School in Jiaxing, Zhejiang, China

Jiaxing Women's Normal School was a school in Jiaxing, China, which was run by Christian missionaries.

== Notable alumni ==
- Wang Huiwu
