= Shen Zuyan =

Chinese structural engineer

- 沈祖炎
- Born: June 5, 1935; Hangzhou, Zhejiang, China
- Died: October 11, 2017 (aged 82); Zhongshan Hospital, Shanghai, China
- Education: Nanyang Model High School; Tongji University
- Scientific career
- Fields: Structural steel
- Workplaces: Tongji University

Shen Zuyan (Chinese: 沈祖炎; pinyin: Shěn Zǔyán; June 5, 1935 – October 11, 2017) was a Chinese structural engineer known for his studies on structural steel. He served as Vice President of Tongji University and was an academician of the Chinese Academy of Engineering.

== Biography ==
Shen was born in Hangzhou, Zhejiang, on June 5, 1935. After graduating from Shanghai Nanyang Model High School in 1951, he was accepted to Tongji University and graduated in 1955. After graduation, he assumed various posts at the university, including teaching assistant，lecturer and deputy director. He was promoted to Associate Professor in October 1980 and to full Professor in August 1984. In 1982, he went to Lehigh University as a visiting scholar. In August 1988 he was appointed director of the State Key Laboratory of Civil Engineering Disaster Prevention, serving until May 1996. In March 1989, he became director of the Shanghai Institute of Disaster Prevention and Relief. In November 1994, he was director of Civil Engineering Research Center for Disaster Prevention. Shen was elected a fellow of the Chinese Academy of Engineering in 2005.

On October 11, 2017, he died of an illness at Zhongshan Hospital in Shanghai.

== Papers ==
- Stability of Single-Layer Reticulated Shells
- Improvements on the Arc-Length-Type Methods
- FEM Analysis of Steel Members Considering Damage Cumulation Effects Under Cyclic Loadings
