= Yang Zhuoxin =

- 杨卓新

President of Hunan University
- In office August 1930 – March 1931
- Preceded by: Hu Yuantan
- Succeeded by: Cao Dianqiu

Personal details
- Born: October 10, 1890 Xinhua County, Hunan, Qing China
- Died: June 10, 1963 (aged 72) Changsha, Hunan, China
- Education: Hunan University; Harvard University; University of Wisconsin–Madison; University of Illinois; Syracuse University
- Occupation: Educator, mathematician

Yang Zhuoxin (simplified Chinese: 杨卓新; traditional Chinese: 楊卓新; pinyin: Yáng Zhuóxīn; 10 October 1890 – 10 June 1963) was a Chinese educator and mathematician who served as president of Hunan University from August 1930 to March 1931.

== Biography ==
Yang was born and raised in Xinhua County, Hunan. He attended Zijiang School. He graduated from Hunan High College (now Hunan University) in 1908. He was sent abroad to study at the expense of the government in 1903. He studied at Harvard University and the University of Wisconsin–Madison. He received his master's degree from the University of Illinois and doctor's degree from Syracuse University. He then studied at Cambridge University (1920), the University of London (1920), the University of Paris (1922), and the Humboldt University of Berlin (1923).

He returned China in 1924 and that year became professor of mathematics at Hunan University. In the spring of 1927 he was appointed academic director of Hunan University. After this office was terminated in August 1930, he became president of Hunan University, serving until March 1931.

On June 10, 1963, he died of stomach cancer in Changsha, Hunan.

Educational offices
Preceded by Hu Yuantan (胡元倓)	President of Hunan University; 1930–1931	Succeeded by Cao Dianqiu (曹典球)
