= Pei Gang =

Chinese biologist

- Born: December 1953 (age 72); Shenyang, Liaoning
- Education: Shenyang Pharmaceutical University; University of North Carolina at Chapel Hill
- Spouse: Ma Lan
- Scientific career
- Fields: Molecular biology
- Workplaces: Shanghai Institute of Biochemistry and Cell Biology; Tongji University

Chinese name
- Simplified Chinese: 裴钢
Transcriptions
Standard Mandarin
- Hanyu Pinyin: Péi Gāng

Pei Gang (Chinese: 裴钢, born 1953) is a Chinese molecular biologist and pharmacologist, and a former president of Tongji University.

== Early life ==
Pei was born in Shenyang, Liaoning in 1953.

== Education ==
In 1977, Pei attended Shenyang Pharmaceutical University. He acquired his bachelor's degree and master's degree in 1982 and 1984, respectively. Pei enrolled at University of North Carolina at Chapel Hill for doctoral studies, and received his PhD degree in 1991.

== Career ==
After returning to China in 1995, Pei worked in the Shanghai Institute of Biochemistry and Cell Biology. He was the director of Shanghai Institutes for Biological Sciences from 2000 to 2007, and the president of Tongji University from 2007 to 2016. Pei was elected as an academician of the Chinese Academy of Sciences in 1999. He is also the president of Chinese Society for Cell Biology.

Pei's research focuses on GPCR signal transduction pathways. His research group discovered new mechanisms of β-arrestin proteins in cellular signal transduction.

== Awards ==
- HLHL Science and Technology Progress Award (1999)
- National Award for Science and Technology Progress, 2nd Class (2002, 2007)
