= Virginia School for Girls =

School in Huzhou, Zhejiang, China

- Traditional Chinese: 湖郡女子中學
- Simplified Chinese: 湖郡女子中学
Transcriptions
Standard Mandarin
- Hanyu Pinyin: Hújùn Nǚzǐ Zhōngxué
- Wade–Giles: Hu-chün Nü-tzu Chung-hsüeh

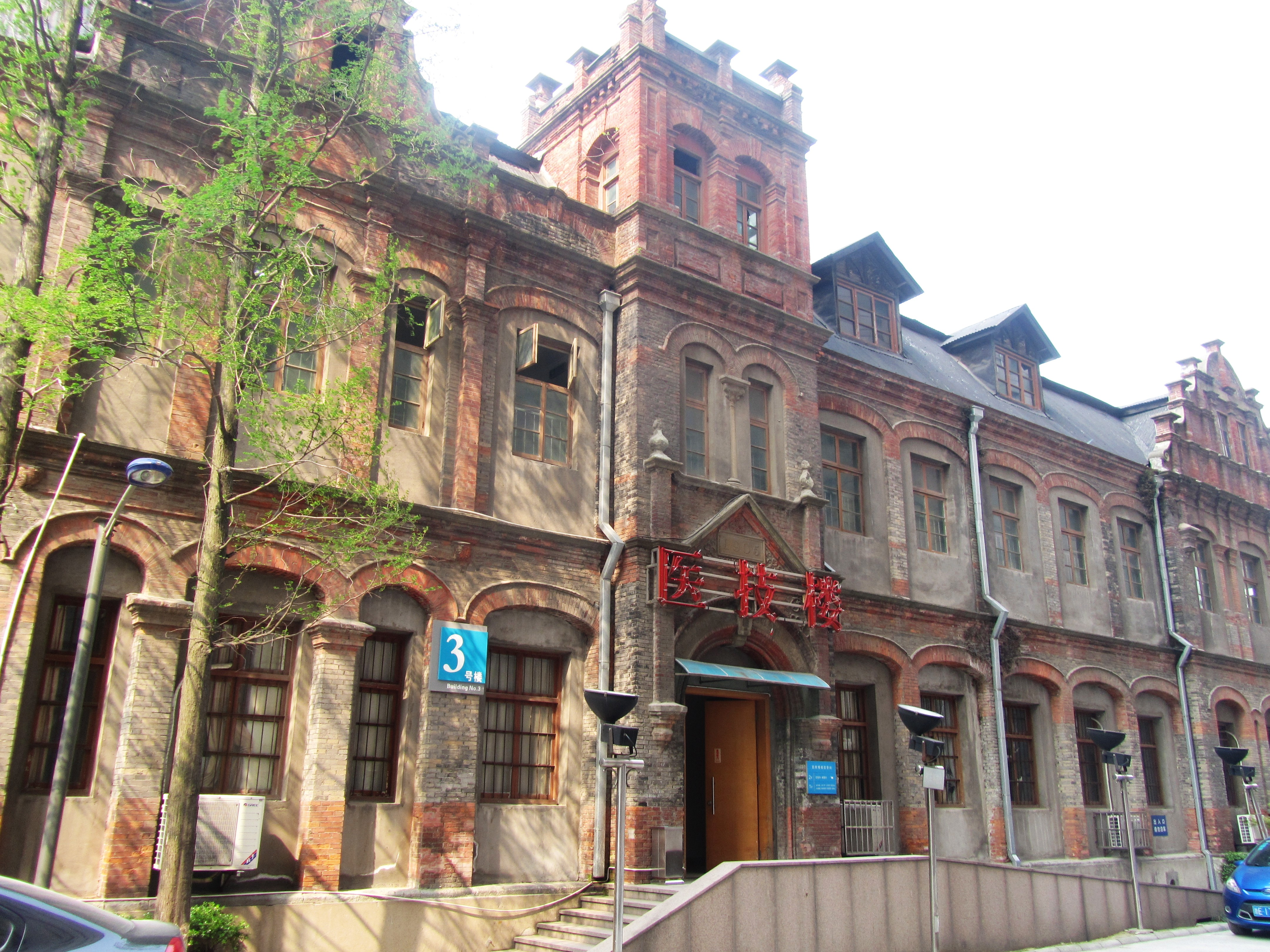
West Building

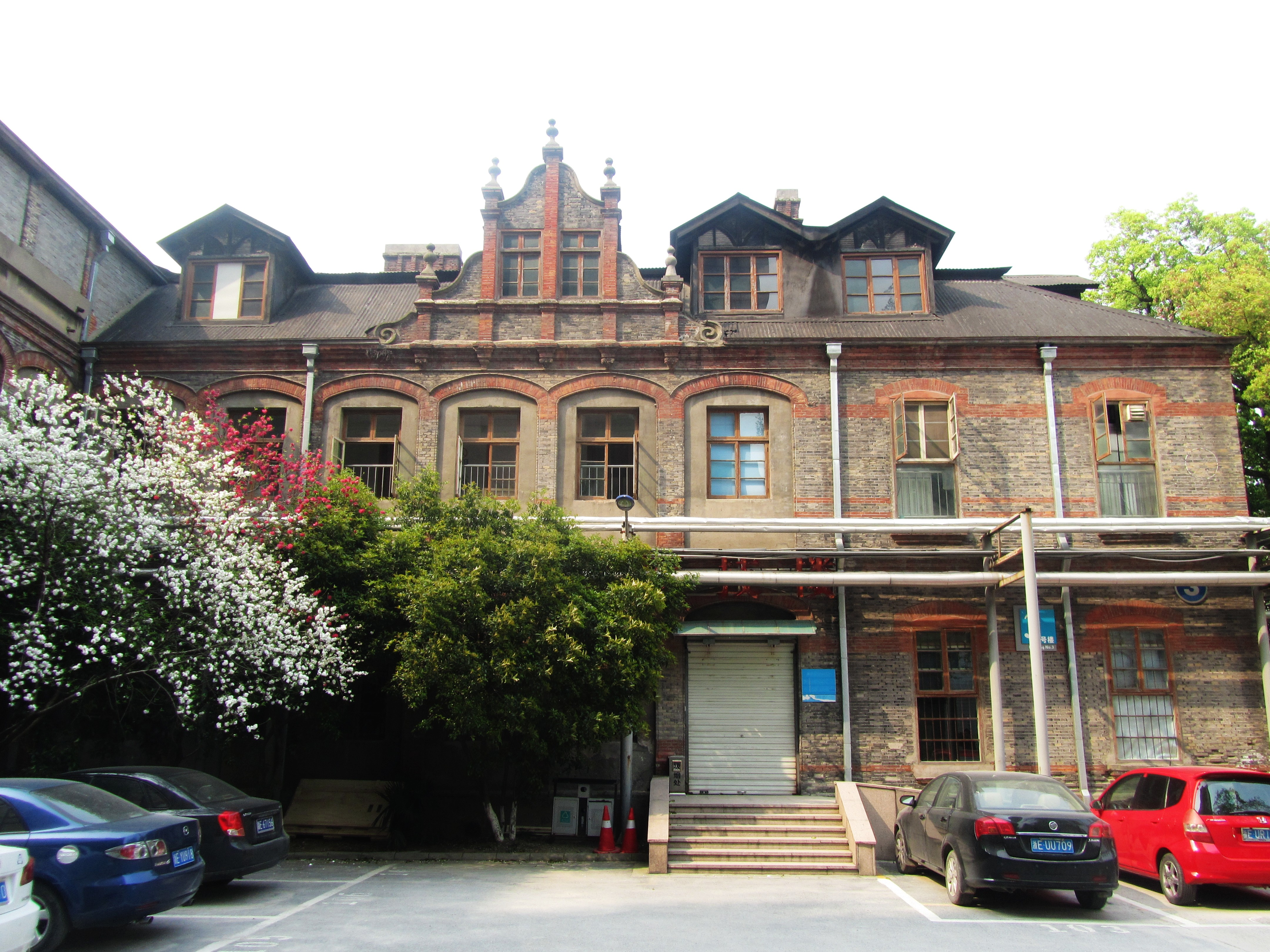
East Building

Virginia School for Girls, also known as Hujun School for Girls (Chinese: 湖郡女子中學), was a school in Huzhou, Zhejiang, China. It was run by Christian missionaries. Its buildings are now used by Huzhou No. 1 People's Hospital, and are listed by the Huzhou government as protected heritage architecture.

== Notable alumni ==
- Wang Huiwu
- American Southern Methodist Episcopal Mission
