= Li Xintian (psychologist) =

Chinese psychologist (1924–2019)

Li Xintian (Chinese: 李心天; February 1924 – 2 May 2019) was a Chinese psychologist. He was considered a founder of medical psychology and neuropsychology in China. He served as chair of medical psychology at the Institute of Psychology of the Chinese Academy of Sciences, and as an adjunct professor at Peking Union Medical College, China Medical University, and Peking University Health Science Center.

== Early life ==
Li was born in February 1924 in Jiaxing, Zhejiang, Republic of China, with his ancestral home in Lingling, Hunan. He was the only son of Li Da, a Marxist philosopher and co-founder of the Chinese Communist Party, and his wife Wang Huiwu. His parents moved frequently, and he spent his childhood in various cities including Changsha, Wuchang, Shanghai, and Beijing.

After the Second Sino-Japanese War broke out in 1937, the Japanese occupied Beijing. Li's family became war refugees and fled across half of China to Guilin and later Guiyang, where his older sister fell ill and died in 1938. Li attended Tsinghua High School in Guiyang and graduated in February 1942.

== Career ==
Li graduated from Xiangya Medical College in June 1948, and stayed on as a physician at the college. In 1958, he entered the Institute of Psychology of the Chinese Academy of Sciences, where he conducted research in medical psychology under the supervision of Ding Zan. He later served as professor and chair of medical psychology at the institute.

He was an adjunct professor at Peking Union Medical College from 1987 to 1990, at China Medical University from 1986 to 1991, and at Peking University Health Science Center (formerly Beijing Medical College) from 1985 to 2000.

His research on the coordination of cerebral hemispheres won multiple national and regional awards. His published works include the widely used reference book Medical Psychology. He is considered a founder of medical psychology and neuropsychology in China.

Li died on 2 May 2019 at Anzhen Hospital in Beijing, at the age of 95.
