= Hu Shuhua =

Chinese politician and educator

- 胡庶华
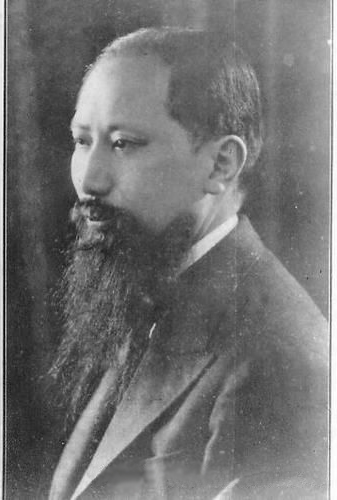
- Hu Shuhua

President of Hunan University
- In office February 1945 – June 1949
- Preceded by: Li Yuyao (李毓尧)
- Succeeded by: Yi Dingxin (易鼎新)
- In office September 1940 – August 1943
- Preceded by: Pi Zongshi
- Succeeded by: Li Yuyao
- In office October 1932 – December 1935
- Preceded by: Cao Dianqiu (曹典球)
- Succeeded by: Huang Shiheng

President of Northwest University
- In office 28 November 1939 – 14 February 1941
- Preceded by: New title
- Succeeded by: Chen Shizhen (陈石珍)

President of Chongqing University
- In office August 1935 – July 1938
- Preceded by: Liu Xiang
- Succeeded by: Ye Yuanlong

President of Tongji University
- In office June 1929 – 1932
- Preceded by: Zhang Qun
- Succeeded by: Weng Zhilong (翁之龙)

Personal details
- Born: December 24, 1886 You County, Hunan, Qing China
- Died: June 17, 1968 (aged 81) Beijing, People's Republic of China
- Party: Kuomintang; Chinese Communist Party
- Education: Peking University; Technische Universität Berlin
- Occupation: Politician, educator

Hu Shuhua (simplified Chinese: 胡庶华; traditional Chinese: 胡庶華; pinyin: Hú Shùhuá; 24 December 1886 – 17 June 1968) was a Chinese politician and educator.

Hu was a member of the 2nd, 3rd, 4th National Committee of the Chinese People's Political Consultative Conference.

== Biography ==
Hu was born into a family of teachers in Chengguan Town of You County, Hunan, on December 24, 1886, during the Qing Empire. He attended Changsha Mingde School in 1903. In 1907, he was accepted to Imperial University of Peking (now Peking University) and graduated in 1911, where he majored in German language. After college, he taught at Hunan Higher Normal School and Changsha Mingde School. In 1903, he went to Germany to study at the Technische Hochschule in Berlin (now Technische Universität Berlin) by the expense of the government. In 1920, he joined the Kuomintang in Berlin.

Hu returned to China in 1922. He became the president of Hunan University in 1923. In 1924, he became a professor at National Wuchang University. He was appointed as director of the Office of Education of Zhejiang government in 1925. In the spring of 1926, he was factory director of Shanghai Steel Plant. In 1927, he served as factory director of Hanyang Arsenal.

In June 1929, he served as president of Tongji University. In 1931, he was elected legislator of Legislative Yuan.

In 1932, he served as the president of Hunan University for the second time. He wrote the lyrics of Hunan University Song in 1933.

In August 1935, he served as president of Chongqing University, and held that office until July 1938. He wrote the lyrics of Chongqing University Song in 1936.

In November 1939, he was appointed president of Northwest University, and served until February 1941.

Hu served as president of Hunan University from September 1940 to August 1943, and again February 1945 to June 1949.

After the establishment of the People's Republic of China (PRC), he became a professor at University of Science and Technology Beijing.

He joined the Chinese Communist Party in 1961.

During the Cultural Revolution, he suffered political persecution and experienced mistreatment by the Red Guards.

Hu died in Beijing, on June 17, 1968.

Educational offices
Preceded by Zhang Qun	President of Tongji University; 1929–1932	Succeeded by Weng Zhilong
Preceded by Cao Dianqiu	President of Hunan University; 1932–1935	Succeeded by Huang Shiheng
Preceded by Liu Xiang	President of Chongqing University; 1935–1938	Succeeded by Ye Yuanlong
New title	President of Northwest University; 1939–1941	Succeeded by Chen Shizhen
Preceded by Pi Zongshi	President of Hunan University; 1940–1943	Succeeded by Li Yuyao
Preceded by Li Yuyao	President of Hunan University; 1945–1949	Succeeded by Yi Dingxin
