= Kwong-Chai Chu =

Chinese hydraulic engineer

Portrait of Kwong-Chai Chu from the book Commemorative book of Huayuankou embankment restoration (1947)

Kwong-Chai Chu (Chinese: 朱光彩; pinyin: Zhū Guāngcǎi; 12 December 1901 – 22 April 1992) was a Chinese hydraulic engineer, who received his CIE (Chinese Institute of Engineers) Award in 1947 for "his flood control engineering dealing with the unruly and turbulent Yellow River".

== Biography ==
According to an introduction in a book by Kwoh-Ting Li, former finance minister (1969-1976) of the Republic of China (p. 587):

"Mr. Kwong-Chai Chu was born in Xichuan County, Henan, and graduated from the Department of Civil Engineering, Tongji University and subsequently Technische Universität Dresden (TUD) ... He had served as the Director of the Engineering Bureau since July 1946 for the restoration of the levees of the Yellow River near Huayuankou."

== Legacy ==
Several scholarships has been established under his name in several institutions, such as the Chinese Institute of Civil and Hydraulic Engineering (CICHE), Cheng Kung Cultural Foundation as well as National Cheng Kung University.
