= Wang Kemin (born 1957) =

Chinese politician and educator

- 王柯敏

Vice-Chairman of the Standing Committee of the Hunan Provincial People's Congress
- In office 30 January 2016 – January 2021
- Chairman: Xu Shousheng; Du Jiahao

Head of Education Department of Hunan Government
- In office September 2011 – March 2016
- Preceded by: Zhang Fangping (张放平)
- Succeeded by: Xiao Guo'an (肖国安)

Head of Science and Technology Department of Hunan Government
- In office February 2003 – September 2011
- Preceded by: Ji Yigui (季益贵)
- Succeeded by: Peng Guofu (彭国甫)

President of Hunan University
- In office May 1999 – April 2003
- Preceded by: Yu Ruqin
- Succeeded by: Gu Shiwen

Personal details
- Born: August 1957 (age 69) Ningxiang County, Hunan, China
- Party: Chinese Communist Party
- Education: Hunan University; ETH Zurich

Wang Kemin (Chinese: 王珂敏; pinyin: Wāng Kēmǐn; born August 1957) is a retired Chinese politician and educator. He previously served as vice-chairman of the Standing Committee of the Hunan Provincial People's Congress, head of Education Department of Hunan government, head of Science and Technology Department of Hunan government, and president of Hunan University.

== Biography ==
Wang was born and raised in Ningxiang County, Hunan. He joined the Chinese Communist Party in November 1985. He received his doctor's degree from Hunan University in 1987. After college, he taught there. From February 1989 to January 1991 he studied at ETH Zurich as a postdoctor. He joined the chemical engineering faculty of Hunan University in January 1991 and was promoted to professor in 1992. He served as dean of Hunan University's College of Chemical Engineering from October 1996 to March 1997 and the university's vice-president from March 1997 to September 1997. In September 1997 he was appointed executive vice president of Hunan University. After this office was terminated in May 1999, he became its president, serving until April 2003.

In February 2003 he was promoted to become head of Science and Technology Department of Hunan Government, a position he held until September 2011, when he was appointed head of Education Department of Hunan Government.

On January 30, 2016, he was installed as vice-chairman of the Standing Committee of the Hunan Provincial People's Congress at the Fifth Plenary Meeting of the Twelfth People's Congress of Hunan.

== Honor ==
He was honored as a Distinguished Young Scholar by the National Science Fund for Distinguished Young Scholars in 1998.

Educational offices
Preceded by Yu Ruqin	President of Hunan University; 1999–2003	Succeeded by Gu Shiwen
Government offices
Preceded by Ji Yigui	Head of Science and Technology Department of Hunan Government; 2003–2011	Succeeded by Peng Guofu
Preceded by Zhang Fangping	Head of Education Department of Hunan Government; 2011–2016	Succeeded by Xiao Guo'an
Party political offices
Preceded by Zhang Fangping	Communist Party Secretary of the Hunan Provincial Education Committee; 2011–2016	Succeeded by Xiao Guo'an
