= Liu Xiang (warlord) =

Chinese warlord in Sichuan (1890–1938)

- 劉湘
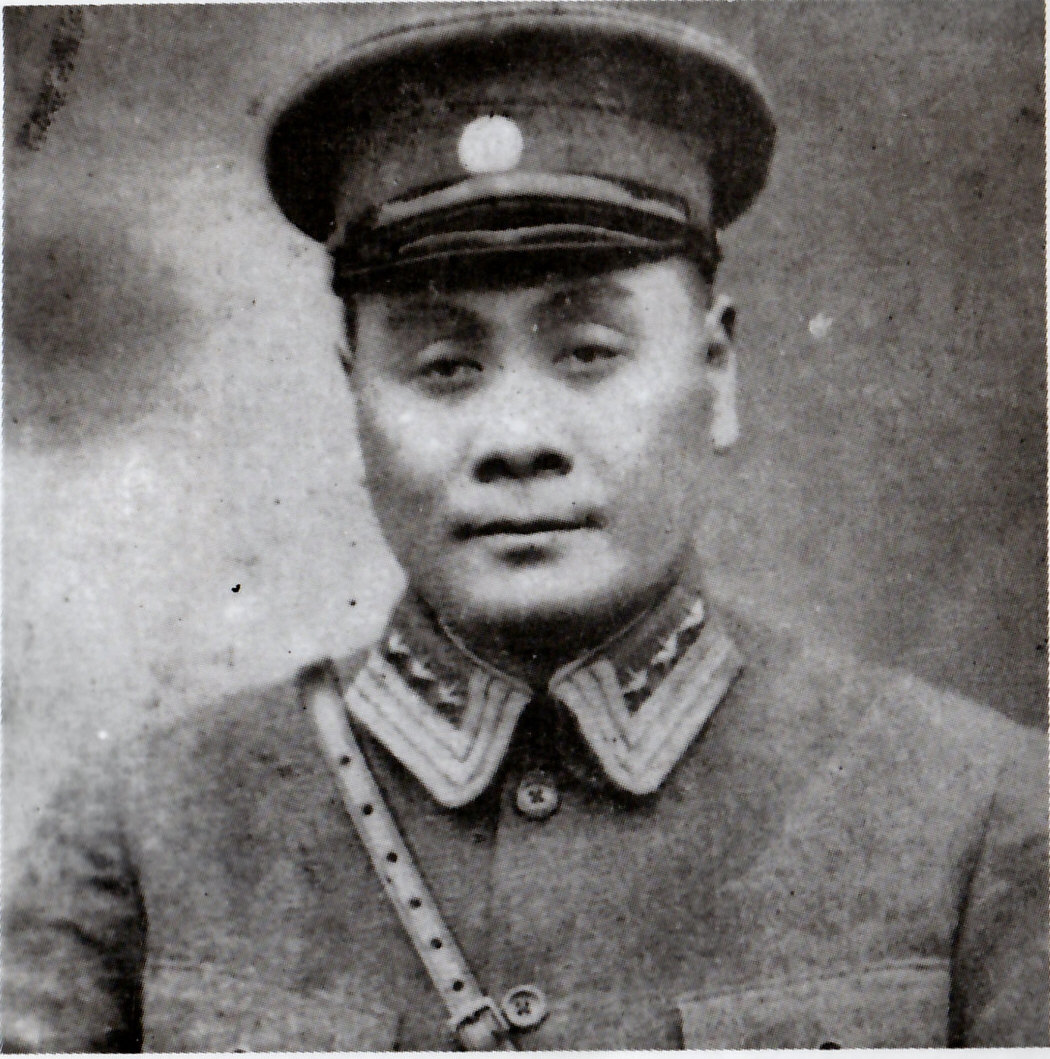
- General Liu Xiang

Governor of Sichuan
- In office December 1934 – January 1938
- Preceded by: Liu Wenhui
- Succeeded by: Zhang Qun

President of Chongqing University
- In office October 1929 – August 1935
- Preceded by: New title
- Succeeded by: Hu Shuhua

Chief of General Staff
- In office July 1926 – June 1927
- Preceded by: Liu Ruxian
- Succeeded by: Position revoked

Commander of Sichuan Clique
- In office June 1921 – May 1922
- Preceded by: Liu Cunhou
- Succeeded by: Liu Chengxun

Personal details
- Born: 1 July 1890 Dayi, Sichuan, Qing China
- Died: 20 January 1938 (aged 47) Hankou, Wuhan, Hubei, Republic of China

Military service
- Allegiance: Republic of China
- Branch/service: Sichuan clique
- Years of service: 1904–1938
- Rank: General
- Unit: 33rd Brigade
- Commands: Commander in Chief 23rd Army Group, general director of the 7th war zone
- Battles/wars: Xinhai Revolution, Chinese Civil War, Second Sino-Japanese War
- Awards: Order of Blue Sky and White Sun

Chinese name
- Traditional Chinese: 劉湘
- Simplified Chinese: 刘湘
Transcriptions
Standard Mandarin
- Hanyu Pinyin: Liú Xiāng
- Wade–Giles: Liu Hsiang

Liu Xiang or Liu Hsiang (Chinese: 劉湘; 1 July 1890 – 20 January 1938) was one of the warlords who controlled Sichuan province during the Warlord era of 20th-century China.

== Life ==
Liu Xiang was born on 1 July 1890, in Dayi, Sichuan, China. He graduated from Sichuan Military College and eventually was promoted to army commander in Sichuan. From 6 June 1921 to 24 May 1922 Liu was both Civil Governor and Military Governor of Sichuan Province, and remained civil governor until December 1922. He again became both civil and military Governor of Sichuan Province from July 1923 until 19 February 1924 and remained military governor until 27 May 1924. He was again military governor between 16 May 1925 until he was replaced by Deng Xihou in 1926.

During the period from 1927 to 1938, Sichuan was in the hands of five warlords: Liu Xiang, Yang Sen, Liu Wenhui, Deng Xihou, and Tian Songyao. No one warlord had enough power to take on all the others at once, so many small battles occurred, pitting one warlord against another. Large conflicts seldom developed, plotting and skirmishing characterized the Sichuanese political scene, and ephemeral coalitions and counter-coalitions emerged and vanished with equal rapidity.

However, Liu Xiang was the most influential of the Sichuan warlords. Aligning himself with Chiang Kai-Shek he became General Commanding 21st Army from 1926 to 1935. He controlled Chongqing and its surrounding areas. This region, sitting on the banks of the Yangtze River, was rich because of trade with provinces downriver and therefore controlled much of the economic activity in Sichuan.

From this position of strength, between 1930 and 1932 Liu and General Liu Wenhui improved their forces, organizing a small airforce at Chengdu, of two Fairchild KR-34CA aeroplanes and a Junkers K53. In 1932 Liu began putting together the "Armored Car and Tank Corps of Chungking". Armored cars were built in Shanghai based on the GMC 1931 truck with a 37 mm gun and 2 MGs in a crude turret.

Liu had a rivalry against his uncle, General Liu Wenhui. In 1935, Liu Xiang ousted Liu Wenhui, becoming Chairman of the Government of Sichuan Province. A family-brokered peace was arranged which mollified Liu Wenhui with control of the neighbouring Xikang province, a sparsely populated but opium-rich territory on the periphery of Han China and Tibet.

At the beginning of the Second Sino-Japanese War Liu Xiang led the Sichuan 15th Army at the Battle of Shanghai and 23rd Army Group in the Battle of Nanking, and was made Commander in Chief of the River Defence Forces for the Yangtze River. In January 1938, he ordered his armies of more than 100,000 soldiers out of Sichuan to fight against the Japanese. However Liu Xiang soon died of stomach cancer on 20 January 1938, in Hankou, Hubei; some suspected he was poisoned by Chiang Kai-shek for conspiring with Shandong chairman Han Fuju to turn against Chiang.

Liu's death and the arrival of the central government in Chongqing in 1938 brought reforms that eventually put an end to the major warlord garrisons. The Sichuan faction broke up and a lot of Sichuan units turned their loyalties over to Chiang Kai-shek and became essentially Central army units and the province a major recruiting ground for the hard pressed Nationalist armies.

== Career ==
- 1921–1922 Governor of Sichuan Province
- 1921–1922 Military-Governor of Sichuan Province
- 1923–1924 Military-Governor of Sichuan Province
- 1923–1924 Governor of Sichuan Province
- 1924 Governor of Sichuan Province
- 1925–1926 Military-Governor of Sichuan Province
- 1926–1935 General Commanding 21st Army
- 1928–1930 General Commanding 3rd Division, 21st Army
- 1930–1932 General Commanding Model Division, 21st Army
- 1933 Commander in Chief Sichuan Province Bandit Suppression Headquarters
- 1935–1938 Chairman of the Government of Sichuan Province
- 1937 General Commanding 15th Army
- 1937 Commander in Chief 23rd Army Group
- 1937–1938 Commander in Chief River Defence Forces

== See also ==
- History of the Republic of China
- Second Sino-Japanese War
- Liangping Aerodrome
- Warlord Era

== Sources ==
- 陈贤庆(Chen Xianqing), 民国军阀派系谈 (The Republic of China warlord cliques discussed), 2007 revised edition
- Rulers; Index Li-Ll, Liu Xiang
  - Rulers: Chinese Administrative divisions; Sichuan
- Steen Ammentorp, The Generals of WWII; Generals from China; Liu Xiang with photo

Government offices
Preceded by Liu Cunhou	Commander of Sichuan Clique; 1921–1922	Succeeded by Liu Chengxun
Preceded by Liu Ruxian	Chief of General Staff; 1926–1927	Succeeded by Position revoked
Preceded by Liu Wenhui	Governor of Sichuan; 1934–1938	Succeeded by Zhang Qun
Educational offices
New title	President of Chongqing University; 1929–1935	Succeeded by Hu Shuhua
