= List of presidents of Hunan University =

The president of Hunan University is the highest academic official of Hunan University. The president is the chief executive, appointed by the Ministry of Education of the People's Republic of China (MOE).

The university's current president is Zhao Yueyu, formerly Dean of the Graduate School of Hunan University.

== Presidents of Hunan University ==
Period	Year	President (English name)	President (Chinese name)	Alma mater	Ref
Hunan Higher Normal School	1912–1914	Feng Gaozhu	凤高翥		
Hunan Higher Normal School	1914–1915	Fu Dingyi	符定一	Peking University	
Hunan Higher Normal School	1915–1916	Wu Jiarui	吴嘉瑞		
Hunan Higher Normal School	1916–1917	Liu Zongxiang	刘宗向	Peking University	
Hunan Public Polytechnic School	1913–1923	Bin Bucheng	宾步程	Technische Universität Berlin	
Hunan Public Polytechnic School	1923–1926	Yang Maojie	杨茂杰		
Hunan Provincial University	February 2016–July 1926	Li Daichen	李待琛	University of Tokyo; Harvard University	
Hunan Provincial University	August 1926–June 1927	Lei Zhuhuan	雷铸寰		
Hunan Provincial University	June 1927–July 1929	Ren Kainan	任凯南	University of London; Waseda University	
Hunan Provincial University	July 1929–August 1930	Hu Yuantan	胡元倓	Hongwen Academy	
Hunan Provincial University	August 1930–March 1931	Yang Zhuoxin	杨卓新	Harvard University; University of Wisconsin; University of Illinois; Syracuse University	
Hunan Provincial University	March 1931–October 1932	Cao Dianqiu	曹典球		
Hunan Provincial University	October 1932–December 1935	Hu Shuhua	胡庶华	Peking University	
Hunan Provincial University	December 1935–July 1937	Huang Shiheng	黄士衡	Aiawa University; Columbia University	
National Hunan University	July 1937–September 1940	Pi Zongshi	皮宗石	University of Tokyo	
National Hunan University	September 1940–August 1943	Hu Shuhua	胡庶华	Peking University	
National Hunan University	August 1943–February 1945	Li Yuyao	李毓尧		
National Hunan University	February 1945–June 1949	Hu Shuhua	胡庶华	Peking University	
Hunan University	July 1949–December 1949	Yi Dingxin	易鼎新	University of Maine; Lehigh University	
Hunan University	December 1949–January 1953	Li Da	李达	Beijing Normal University; University of Tokyo	
Hunan University	February 1953–July 1953	Zhu Fan	朱凡	Shanghai University of Arts	
Hunan Institute of Technology	May 1953–June 1958	Liu Shiying	柳士英	Tokyo Institute of Technology	
Hunan University	July 1959–September 1968	Zhu Fan	朱凡	Shanghai University of Arts	
Hunan University	July 1978–March 1981	Zhang Jian	张健		
Hunan University	March 1981–June 1982	Zhu Fan	朱凡	Shanghai University of Arts	
Hunan University	June 1982–December 1987	Cheng Wenshan	成文山	Wuhan University	
Hunan University	December 1987–July 1993	Weng Zuze	翁祖泽	Harbin Institute of Technology	
Hunan University	July 1993–May 1999	Yu Ruqin	俞汝勤	Saint Petersburg State University	
Hunan University	May 1999–April 2003	Wang Kemin	王柯敏	Hunan University; ETH Zurich	
Hunan University	April 2003–July 2005	Gu Shiwen	谷士文	Beijing Jiaotong University	
Hunan University	July 2005–September 2011	Zhong Zhihua	钟志华	Hunan University	
Hunan University	September 2011–January 2016	Zhao Yueyu	赵跃宇	Xiangtan University; Beijing Institute of Technology	
Hunan University	January 2016–present	Duan Xianzhong	段献忠	Huazhong University of Science and Technology	

== Communist Party secretaries of Hunan University ==
Period	Year	Communist Party Secretary (English name)	Communist Party Secretary (Chinese name)	Alma mater	Ref
Hunan Institute of Technology	March 1956–March 1958	Gao Shezi	高舍梓		
Hunan Institute of Technology	March 1958–August 1960	Xu Qianli	徐千里		
Hunan University	August 1960–September 1966	Dai Yan	戴彦		
Hunan University	May 1970–June 1982	Zhang Jian	张健		
Hunan University	June 1982–December 1985	Yang Shijie	杨世杰		
Hunan University	December 1985–August 1993		赵里生		
Hunan University	August 1993–April 2000	Liu Guangdong	刘光栋	Tianjin University	
Hunan University	April 2000–January 2016	Liu Keli	刘克利	Hunan University	
Hunan University	January 2016–June 2018	Jiang Changzhong	蒋昌忠		
Hunan University	June 2018–present	Deng Wei	邓卫		
