= Luo Xiaowei =

Chinese architect (1925–2020)

Luo Xiao Wei (Chinese: 罗小未; September 10, 1925 - June 8, 2020) was a Chinese architect. started her education at the St. John's University in Shanghai where she graduated in 1948 as an architecture major. She became a lecturer afterwards, and with the 1952 Reorganization of Chinese Higher Education, she found herself working with Tongji University in Shanghai. There, she practiced as a teaching assistant, lecturer, associate professor and professor, as well as eventually becoming the founder of the Architectural History and Theory department at the institution.

== Exchange of Architectural Thought and Culture ==
Luo Xiao Wei systematically introduced one of the first courses on Western history, theory and thought into the Chinese architectural curriculum, and authored a plethora of textbooks, many of which have been adopted and are now fundamental to the curriculum of over 300 schools across the country.

While she gained recognition and respect in China for these accomplishments, Luo Xiao Wei is celebrated not for a one-sided import of information and ideas but rather the exchange of cultures between the east and west during her time abroad. After the implementation of the 1978 Open Door Policy, she is considered to have entered her 'golden age' of teaching, in which she spent a vast amount of time abroad immersing herself in various countries both learning and teaching: she conducted numerous lectures at overseas universities and would dedicate a large portion of her time engaging in academic discussions with local practitioners and scholars. Despite being such a big proponent of international architectural theory, she was one also of the first to vocalize a move away from eurocentrism ideologies. She emphasized that by learning about international architecture, one must understand "what it is and why it is the way it is" because "if one is unable to analyze and criticize it, one would not be able to learn from it," which was the real goal of looking at and studying cultures outside of one's own.

=== The first textbooks ===
Scholarly literature in Luo Xiao Wei's specialization was not abundant when she first entered the field of teaching. Recognizing this, she took it upon herself to compile and publicize information that could fill this gap. Given the extremely limited resources as well as the multidisciplinary knowledge that was needed to put these texts together, this was no easy feat; she additionally believed that imagery would be a priceless contribution to these publications as many viewing the books would have no way of ever visiting the structures in person. In total, she produced over 10 types of teaching materials composed up a multitude of textbooks, photo collections, and presentation slides. Books such as A Pictorial History of World Architecture, as she promised, were filled with images of architectural forms, construction detailing, and building facades painstakingly compiled in order to advance academic knowledge in the area.

=== Published work ===
- (1982) 外国近现代建筑史; Modern History of Architecture in Foreign Countries. Luo Xiaowei.
- (1986) 外国建筑历史图说; A Pictorial History of World Architecture. Luo Xiaowei, Cai Wanying.
- (1996) 上海建筑指南; A guide to Shanghai Architecture. Luo Xiaowei.
- (1997) 上海弄堂; Shanghai Longtang. Luo Xiaowei, Wu Jiang.
- (2003) 上海老虹口北部昨天·今天·明天：保护、更新于发展规划研究; The Yesterday, Today and Tomorrow of Shanghai Northern Old Hongkou: Planning Study for Conservation, Renewal and Development. (Shanghai, Tongji University Press) Luo Xiaowei.
- (2005) 外国建筑历史图说; Illustrated History of Foreign Architecture. (Shanghai, Tongji University Press) Luo Xiaowei.

=== Restoration work ===
Luo Xiao Wei was also passionate about restoration work of heritage buildings within her hometown of Shanghai. As such, she was involved in the protection of notable structures and worked on heritage conservation policies within the architectural realm. Due to this efforts, many see her as a pioneer in the preservation of culture and conservation work in Shanghai and even gained the nickname of 'the Goddess of Protection' for this work.

== Positions held ==
- (1984-1996) Chairman of The Architectural Society of Shanghai China 《上海市建筑学会》
- Honorary Chairman of The Architectural Society of Shanghai《上海市建筑学会》
- (1985-2001) Founder of Time+Architecture Magazine and served as its Editor in Chief
- Council of The Architectural Society of China《中国建筑学会》 for its 4th-8th runs
- Honorary Fellow of the AIA
