= Yu Ruqin =

Chinese chemist

- 俞汝勤

President of Hunan University
- In office July 1993 – May 1999
- Preceded by: Weng Zuze
- Succeeded by: Wang Kemin

Personal details
- Born: November 21, 1935 (age 90) Shanghai, China
- Education: Yali School; Beijing Foreign Studies University; Saint Petersburg State University

Yu Ruqin (Chinese: 俞汝勤; pinyin: Yú Rǔqín; born 21 November 1935) is a Chinese chemist. He served as president of Hunan University from 1993 to 1999 and is an academician of the Chinese Academy of Sciences.

== Biography ==
Yu was born in Shanghai, but was raised in Changsha, Hunan, his hometown. He secondary studied at Yali School. He graduated from Beijing Foreign Studies University and Saint Petersburg State University. After graduation, he worked at the Institute of Chemistry of the Chinese Academy of Sciences. At the same time, he taught at the University of Science and Technology of China.

He taught at Hunan University since 1962, what he was promoted to professor in 1980, and served as the university's president from 1993 to 1999.

In 1991, he was elected a fellow of the Chinese Academy of Sciences. He is a member of the Chinese Chemical Society. He was a member of the 6th, 8th, and 9th National Committee of the Chinese People's Political Consultative Conference.

Educational offices
Preceded by Weng Zuze	President of Hunan University; 1993–1999	Succeeded by Wang Kemin
