= Gu Shiwen =

Chinese educator and physicist

- 谷士文

President of Hunan University
- In office April 2003 – July 2005
- Preceded by: Wang Kemin
- Succeeded by: Zhong Zhihua

President of Central China Normal University
- In office February 2001 – April 2003
- Preceded by: Lu Gang
- Succeeded by: Ma Min

Personal details
- Born: May 1944 (age 82) Yuyao, Zhejiang, China
- Party: Chinese Communist Party
- Education: Beijing Jiaotong University
- Occupation: Educator, physicist

Gu Shiwen (Chinese: 谷士文; pinyin: Gǔ Shìwén; born May 1944) is a Chinese educator and physicist. He previously served as president of Central China Normal University from 2001 to 2003, and president of Hunan University between 2003 and 2005.

Gu is a member of the China Railway Society and Chinese Signal Processing Society.

== Biography ==
Gu was born and raised in Yuyao, Zhejiang. He entered Beijing Jiaotong University in 1963, majoring in communication science, where he graduated in 1967. From 1967 to 1978 he worked in Liuzhou Railway Bureau. Beginning in 1978, he served in several posts in the School of Railway of Central South University, he was deputy dean in 1989, and four years later promoted to the dean position. In 2000 he was vice-president of Central South University, one year later, he was transferred to Wuhan, capital of Hubei province, and appointed the president of Central China Normal University. He became the president of Hunan University in April 2003, and held that office until July 2005.

Educational offices
Preceded by Lu Gang (路钢)	President of Central China Normal University; 2001–2003	Succeeded by Ma Min (马敏)
Preceded by Wang Kemin (王柯敏)	President of Hunan University; 2003–2005	Succeeded by Zhong Zhihua (钟志华)
