= Liu Zongxiang =

- 刘宗向

President of Hunan University
- In office 1916–1917
- Preceded by: Wu Jiarui
- Succeeded by: Bin Bucheng

Personal details
- Born: 1897 Ningxiang County, Hunan, Qing Empire
- Died: 1951 (aged 53–54) Changsha, Hunan, People's Republic of China
- Education: Peking University

Liu Zongxiang (simplified Chinese: 刘宗向; traditional Chinese: 劉宗向; pinyin: Liú Zōngxiàng; 1897–1951) was a Chinese educator who served as president of Hanguang Private Girls' School from 1921 to 1924, and president of Hunan University from 1916 to 1917.

== Names ==
His courtesy name was Yinxian (寅先), and his art name was Zhongyuan (盅园) and Buguosheng (补过生).

== Biography ==
Liu was born in Ningxiang County, Hunan, in 1897, during the Qing Empire. He attended Changsha Mingde School in 1904. He was accepted to Imperial University of Peking (now Peking University). After college, he was assigned to the Qing government as an officer, and later became a professor at Shanxi University. Liu returned to Changsha, Hunan in 1911. He taught at Hunan Zhonglu Normal School and worked as an editor of Hunan Education. He was president of Hunan University between 1916 and 1917. In 1921, he founded Han'guang Private Girls' School and served as its president. After the founding of the People's Republic of China, he became a staff member at Hunan Research Institute of Culture and History. He died in Changsha in 1951.

Educational offices
Preceded by Wu Jiarui (吴嘉瑞)	President of Hunan University; 1916–1917	Succeeded by Bin Bucheng
