= Ren Kainan =

- 任凯南

President of Hunan University
- In office June 1927 – July 1929
- Preceded by: Lei Zhuhuan
- Succeeded by: Hu Yuantan

Personal details
- Born: August 1884 Xiangyin County, Hunan, Qing Empire
- Died: 1949 (aged 64–65) Changsha, Hunan, Republic of China
- Party: Tongmenghui; Kuomintang
- Education: University of London; Waseda University

Ren Kainan (simplified Chinese: 任凯南; traditional Chinese: 任凱南; pinyin: Rén Kaǐnán; August 1884-July 1949) was a Chinese educator who served as president of Hunan University from June 1927 to July 1929.

== Biography ==
Ren was born in Xiangyin County, Hunan, during the Qing Empire. He attended Hunan Industrial High School (now Hunan University). After graduation, he went to studied at Waseda University, in Shinjuku of Tokyo, Japan. When he studied at Japan, he got acquainted with Huang Xing, and joined the Tongmenghui. He returned to China in 1911, after the Xinhai Revolution, he established the Republic of China Daily (Chinese: 民国日报) in French concession in Hankou, Hubei. The Beiyang government closed down the newspaper when its articles againsted Yuan Shikai's restoration of monarchy. He received his Doctor of Economics from the University of London in 1921.

He returned to China in 1922 and that year became President of Hunan Business School. He also founded Changsha Dalu School (Chinese: 长沙大麓中学) and served as Chief-Librarian of Hunan Provincial Library. In 1926, he became a professor at Hunan University, he became its president in June 1927, and held that office until July 1929. In August 1927, he was recruited by National Wuhan University (now Wuhan University) as a professor, and became its director of Department of Economics in October 1932. In July 1937, he served as provost of Hunan University and concurrently served as board chairman of Changsha Dalu School. In 1940, he served as president of Changsha Dalu School. After the Second Sino-Japanese War, he resigned.

In July 1949, he died of stroke in Changsha, Hunan.

Educational offices
Preceded by Lei Zhuhuan (雷铸寰)	President of Hunan University; 1927–1929	Succeeded by Hu Yuantan (胡元倓)
