= Li Guohao =

Chinese engineer (1913–2005)

Li Guohao (Chinese: 李国豪; pinyin: Lǐ Guóháo; Wade–Giles: Li Kuo-hao; born 13 April 1913 in Mei County, Guangdong; died 23 February 2005 in Shanghai) was a Chinese structural engineer and bridge engineering expert, known as Suspension Bridge Li. His method of calculation, with a high degree of precision although of extreme complexity, can cut down the cost of engineering and promote bridge stability. Li also served as Chairman of the Chinese People's Political Consultative Conference (CPPCC) of Shanghai, making him a politician of provincial-ministerial rank.

== Biography ==
At the age of 16, Li, the son of a poor farming family, completed the preparatory course for Tongji University in Shanghai and started studying civil engineering there in 1931, graduating with distinction in 1936. Just one year later, Li took over the seminars for steelwork and steel bridges from his German predecessor – in those days Tongji University had many visiting German scientists on its staff, including Erich Wilfried Reuleaux (1883-1967), professor for railways and transport in Darmstadt (Germany), who was in China from 1934 to 1937.

Furnished with a scholarship from the Alexander von Humboldt Foundation, Li started his research work under Kurt Klöppel at TU Darmstadt in the autumn of 1938. He was awarded a doctorate in 1940 for his groundbreaking dissertation on the practical calculation of suspension bridges according to second-order theory. Together, Klöppel and Li published further research findings on the quantitative analysis of suspension bridges. Turning to stability theory, during the drafting of DIN 4114 (German Standard of stability of steel structures), the excellent article appeared on the sufficient criterion for the branching point of elastic equilibrium, which Klöppel and Li explained using the example of the buckling of struts – and their theoretical findings also applied to overturning, plate buckling and torsional-flexural buckling. Li submitted his habilitation thesis to the Faculty of Construction at Darmstadt TH in January 1942.

After the war, he returned to Shanghai, to take up a post as professor at Tongji University in 1946. While there, he wrote textbooks on the design of steel structures (1952), steel bridges (1952) and bridge dynamics (1955). Li was elected a member of the Chinese Academy of Sciences in 1955. One year later he became pro-rector of Tongji University and established the Faculty of Applied Mechanics, where he lectured in structural dynamics and the mechanics of plates and shells. Li already had a reputation as a bridges engineer by now and influenced the design of several bridges over the Yangtze. Like many intellectuals, Li was ostracised as a reactionary scientific force during China's Cultural Revolution (1966-1976), but was rehabilitated in 1977 and became rector of his Alma Mater. Li remained productive even during the Cultural Revolution.

During the 1980s, Li wrote books on earthquake engineering (1980), engineering works subjected to explosions (1989) and, of course, the calculation of bridges (1988). The 1980s can be quite rightly called the preparatory phase for the building of large bridges in China, with Li as its founding father. Li Guohao participated in several famous bridge designs and constructions such as Chengdu-Kunming Railway Bridge and Nanjing Yangtze River Bridge. His services to scientific-technical developments were acknowledged by numerous awards, e.g. the Goethe Medal (1982), honorary doctorates from Tongji University (1984) and TU Darmstadt (1985), member of the Chinese Academy of Engineering Sciences (1994) and the Ho Leung Ho Lee Prize (1995).

Due to his outstanding achievements, Li was rated as one of top 10 world-famous bridge experts by the International Association for Bridge and Structural Engineering in 1981.

== Works ==
- with Kurt Klöppel: Hängebrücken mit besonderer Stützbedingung des Versteifungsträgers, in: Der Stahlbau 13 (1940), No. 21/22, pp. 109-116. (in German)
- Praktische Berechnung von Hängebrücken nach der Theorie II. Ordnung. Einfeldrige und durchlaufende Versteifungsträger mit konstantem und veränderlichen Trägheitsmoment, in: Der Stahlbau 14 (1941), No. 14/15, pp. 65-69 & No. 16/18, pp. 78-84. (in German)
- with Kurt Klöppel: Berechnung von Hängebrücken nach der Theorie II. Ordnung unter Berücksichtigung der Nachgiebigkeit der Hänger, in: Der Stahlbau 14 (1941), No. 19/20, pp. 85-88. (in German)
- with Kurt Klöppel: Das hinreichende Kriterium für den Verzweigungspunkt des elastischen Gleichgewichts, in: Der Stahlbau 16 (1943), No. 6/7, pp. 17-21. (in German)
- Ermittlung der Einflußlinien von Stabwerken auf geometrischem Wege, in: Der Stahlbau 16 (1943), No. 12/13, pp. 45-52 & No. 14/16, pp. 58-64. (in German)
- with Kurt Klöppel: Das hinreichende Kriterium für den Verzweigungspunkt des elastischen Gleichgewichts, in: Der Stahlbau 16 (1943), No. 6/7, pp. 17-21. (in German)
- Analysis of Box Girder and Truss Bridges. Berlin/Heidelberg: Springer-Verlag 1988.
- with A. Chen, A., 2001. Neuere Großbrücken in China, in: Stahlbau 70 (2001), No. 9, pp. 661-666. (in German)

Political offices
Preceded by Wang Yiping	Chairman of Chinese People's Political Consultative Conference Shanghai Municipal Committee; 1983–1988	Succeeded by Xie Xide
