= Liu Shiying (architect) =

Chinese architect and educator (1893 – 1973)

- 柳士英
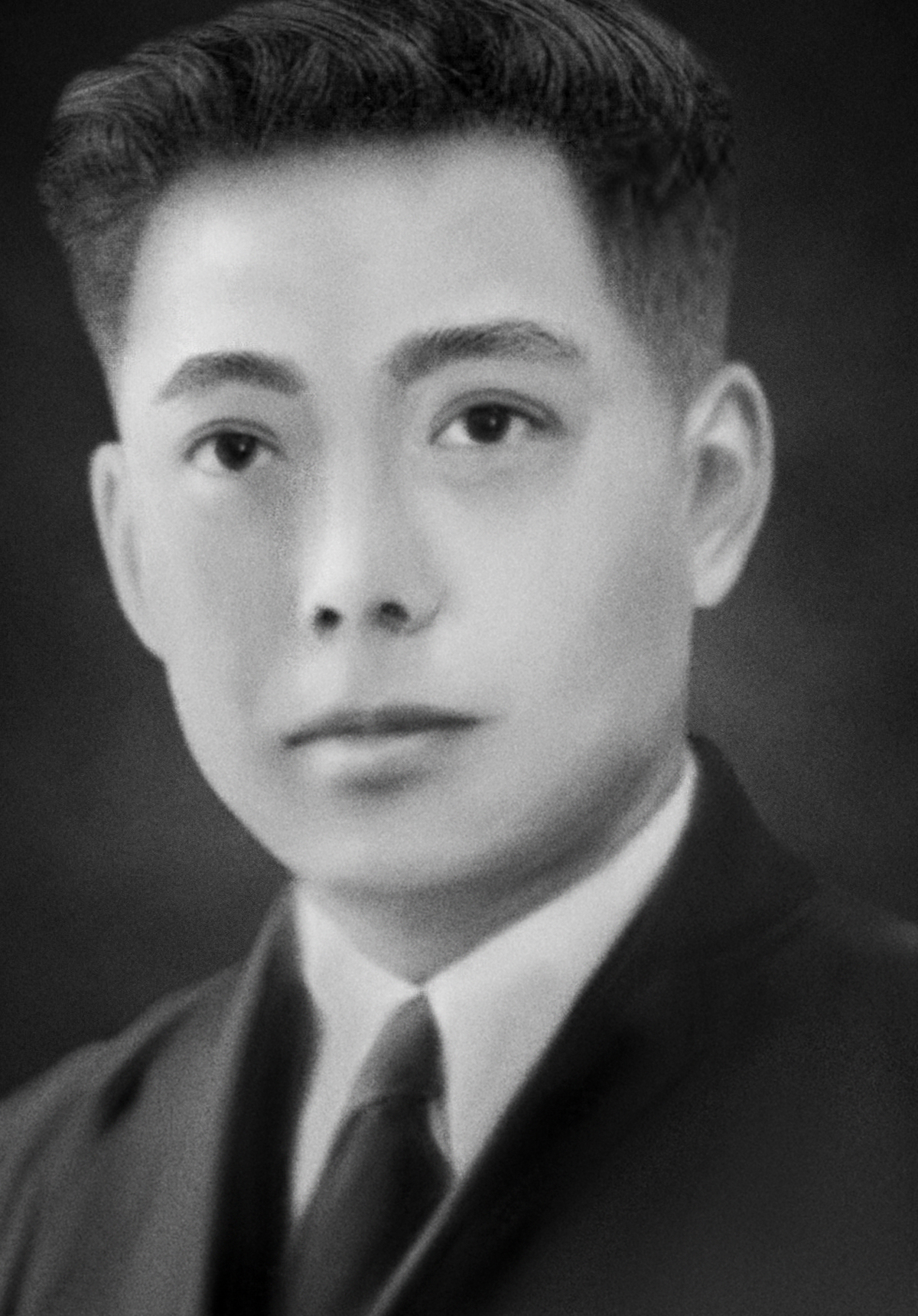
- Liu Shiying

President of Hunan Institute of Technology
- In office May 1953 – June 1958
- Preceded by: Zhu Fan
- Succeeded by: Zhu Fan

Personal details
- Born: 26 October 1893 Suzhou, Jiangsu, Qing China
- Died: 15 July 1973 (aged 79) Changsha, Hunan, China
- Spouse: Fan Lisheng
- Children: 7
- Education: Tokyo Institute of Technology
- Occupation: Modern Chinese architect, architectural educator

Liu Shiying (Chinese: 柳士英; 26 October 1893 – 15 July 1973), also known as Feixiong, was a Chinese architect and educator. Liu Shiying had five major contributions to the history of Chinese architecture:

- He was the founder of modern architectural education in China.
- He founded one of the first design firms run by Chinese architects in China.
- He was in charge of urban planning for Suzhou, laying the foundation for modern city development in Suzhou.
- He founded the Department of Architecture in Hunan University. Liu designed the early modern architectural complex in Hunan University, which became a nationally protected cultural relic.
- He introduced early modern architectural style into China, which was particularly rare in China at that time.

== Early life ==
Liu Shiying was born in Suzhou City, Jiangsu Province on October 26, 1893. He lost his father in his childhood. In 1907 he was admitted to the Jiangnan Army Academy. During the Revolution of 1911, he served as the battalion commander of the Northern Expedition, and led troops in the Battle of Nanjing.

After the failure of the second revolution, he fled to Japan with his brother and changed his name to Feixiong. In 1914 he was admitted to the Department of Architecture of the Tokyo Higher Technical School (now Tokyo Institute of Technology). In 1920 he graduated and returned to Shanghai, China.

== Career ==
In 1923, together with friends Liu Dunzhen, Wang Kesheng and Zhu Shigui, Liu founded Huahai Architectural Practice in Shanghai, one of the first Chinese architectural firms, in an era in which foreigners monopolized the Chinese architectural market. The first design project was the early modern industry Hangzhou Wulin Paper Mill, followed by design projects in Shanghai, Suzhou, Nanjing, Wuhan and other provinces.

In the meantime, Liu gradually realized that developing modern architecture in China could not only depend on a few Chinese modern architects, but it was more important to establish modern architectural education in China. Subsequently, in 1924 Liu founded Suzhou Higher Technical School, which is considered to be the beginning of modern architectural education in China. He served as the director and professor of the department, and also invited Liu Dunzhen and Zhu Shigui to join. From then on, modern architectural education in China would gradually grow and thrive.

In 1928 Liu was appointed as the director of Suzhou Municipal Engineering. He formulated three horizontal, three vertical, and six main roads, as well as peripheral circulation lines. He had the streets of the old city broadened and had the river systems in the city repaired. All his work laid the foundation for the construction of the modern city of Suzhou. In 1930 Liu was hired by the Civil Engineering Department of Daxia University and Shanghai Zhonghua Vocational Education Association. While he was teaching, he also designed Zhonghua Hall at Shanghai Zhonghua Vocational School, Xincun Village at Daxia University and the Wang Boqun House in Shanghai.

In 1934 Liu joined the faculty of Hunan University and served as the director of the Department of Civil Engineering. In 1952 he was appointed to establish the Central and Southern Civil Engineering College and served as its dean a year later. In 1958 he was appointed as dean of Hunan Institute of Technology and vice president of Hunan University. He wrote several books, such as Western Architectural History, Five-column Specifications, Architectural Construction, and Architectural Drawing Specifications. From the 1920s to 1950s Liu Shiying designed 42 buildings, such as Changsha Light Company, Changsha Hospital, and the Grand Auditorium, Library, and Engineering Hall at Hunan University. Eight of his design works have become nationally protected cultural relics.

== Design concept ==
Liu Shiying advocated that architecture should be viewed as reflecting culture. Even though at the time many Chinese architects who got educated in Western countries had the same opinions, he was the first one to state it. He pointed out the backwardness of the style, layout and function in Chinese traditional architecture, and thus further advocated that civilization must be first improved. Ten years after his talk, a New Life Movement arose in China. His design style was mainly Modernism, which was rare in China at that time. He was against luxuriant decoration and promoted a fresh and concise style. He advocated the combination of artistry and practicality.

== List of design works ==
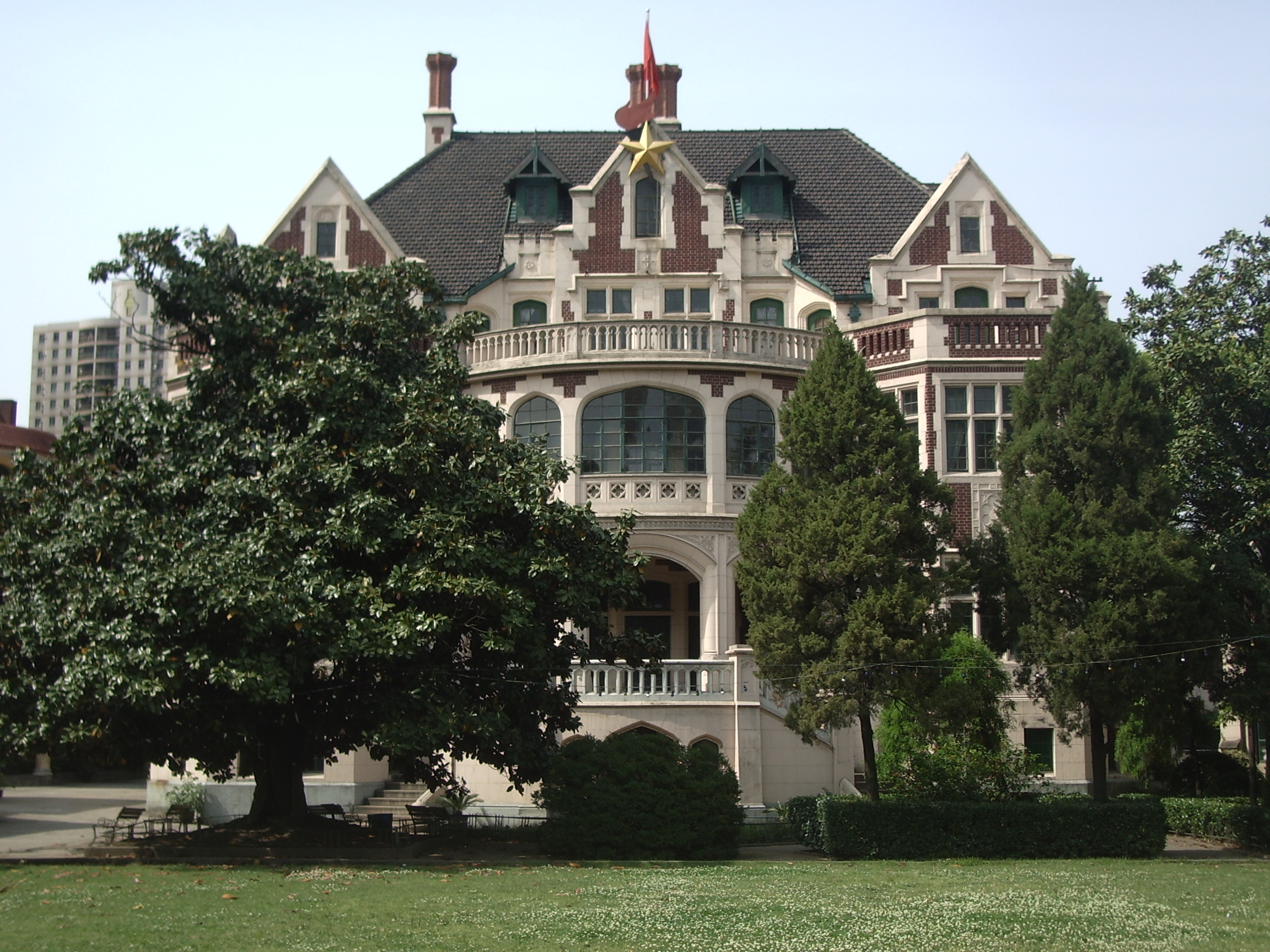
Wang Boqun House (now Shanghai Changning Children's Palace)

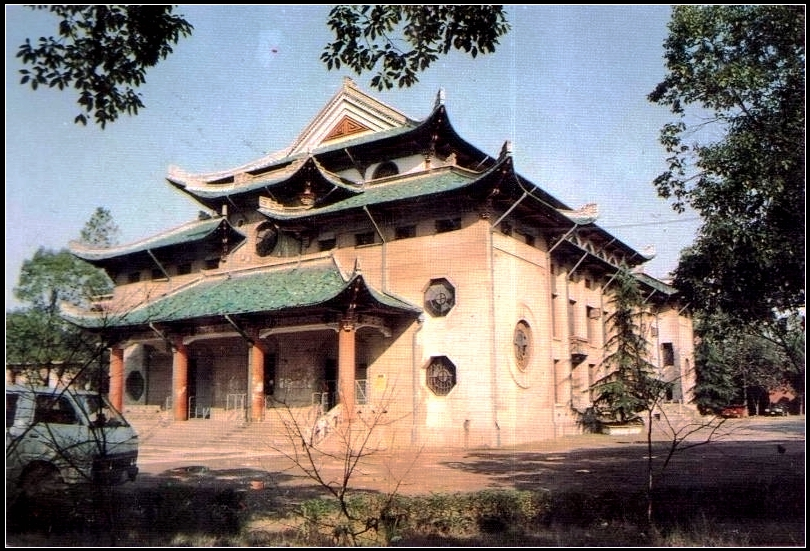
Grand Auditorium at Hunan University

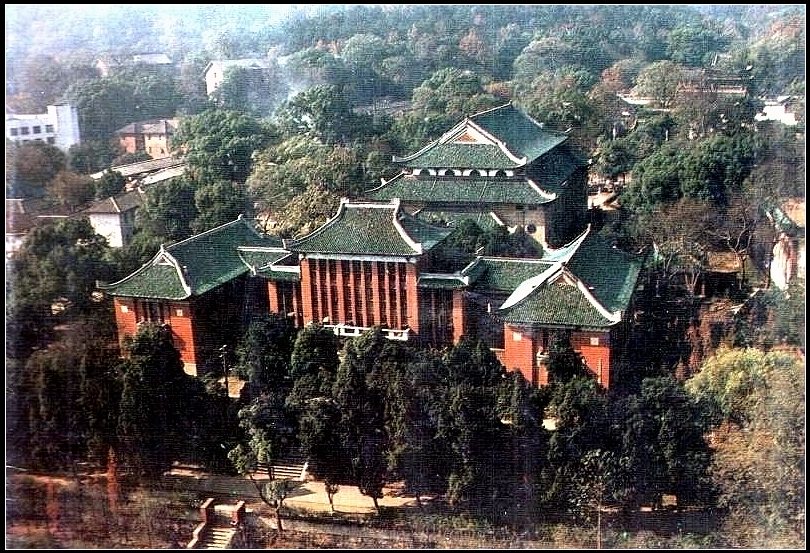
Aerial view of Hunan University Library and Grand Auditorium, both designed by Liu Shiying

From the 1920s to 1950s Liu Shiying completed 42 design works:

- Shanghai Tongxi Textile Mill: Shanghai, 1921
- Elementary School: Shanghai, 1921
- Movie Theater: Shanghai, 1921
- Employee Housing: Shanghai, 1921
- Hangzhou Wulin Paper Mill: Hangzhou, 1922
- Nanjing Dagao Club: Nanjing, 1922–1930
- Lecture Hall in Nanjing Advanced Industrial School: Nanjing, 1922–1930
- Lecture Hall in Suzhou Advanced Industrial School: Suzhou, 1922–1930
- Fan Buchen House: Suzhou, 1922–1930
- Bank of China in Wuhu: Wuhu, 1922–1930
- Urban planning of Suzhou: Suzhou, 1926
- Chinese Academy of Arts in Shanghai (now Shanghai Literature and Art Publishing Company): Shanghai, 1930
- Employee Housing in Shanghai Daxia College (now East China Normal University): Shanghai, 1930–1934
- Zhonghua Hall in Shanghai Vocational School: Shanghai, 1932–1934
- Wang Boqun House (now Shanghai Changning Children's Palace): Shanghai, 1932–1934
- Changsha Light Company: Changsha, 1934
- Exhibition Hall of Four Provinces (destroyed): Changsha, 1934
- Changsha Commercial Press: Changsha, 1934–1937
- Bank of Shanghai in Changsha (destroyed): Changsha, 1934–1937
- Li Wenyu Gold Store: Changsha, 1934
- School Buildings in Hunan University for temporary use in the war: Hunan, 1937–1945
- Xiushan Bank of Transportation: Sichuan, 1938
- Treasury Building in Zhongjiao Bank of Agriculture: Hunan, 1939
- Changsha Hospital (destroyed): Changsha, 1947
- Cai Fusheng House: Changsha, 1947
- Science Hall in Hunan University: Changsha, 1946
- 1st Student Housing in Hunan University: Changsha, 1946
- 2nd Student Housing in Hunan University: Changsha, 1946
- 3rd Student Housing in Hunan University: Changsha, 1946
- 4th Student Housing in Hunan University: Changsha, 1947
- 7th Student Housing in Hunan University: Changsha, 1947
- Jingyizhai Employee Housing in Hunan University: Changsha, 1947
- Jixianchun Employee Housing in Hunan University: Changsha, 1947
- Shenglizhai Employee Housing in Hunan University: Changsha, 1948
- Zhishancun Employee Housing in Hunan University: Changsha, 1948
- Engineering Hall in Hunan University: Changsha, 1947–1951
- Hunan University Library: Changsha, 1950
- Grand Auditorium in Hunan University: Changsha, 1951
- Rebuilt Autumn-Admiring Pavilion: Changsha, 1951
- Planning of Huazhong University of Science and Technology: Wuhan, 1952
- Grand Auditorium in Wuhan Government: Wuhan, 1953-1954

Educational offices
Preceded by Zhu Fan	President of Hunan Institute of Technology; 1953–1958	Succeeded by Zhu Fan
