= Li Daichen =

Chinese educator and military officer

- 李待琛

President of Chung Cheng Institute of Technology
- In office September 1934 – 1937
- Preceded by: Xu Zheng
- Succeeded by: Liang Qiang

President of Hunan University
- In office February 1926 – July 1926
- Preceded by: Yang Maojie
- Succeeded by: Lei Zhuhuan

Personal details
- Born: September 28, 1891 Hengshan County, Hunan, Qing Empire
- Died: November 15, 1959 (aged 68) Kaohsiung, Taiwan, Republic of China
- Party: Kuomintang
- Spouse: Gan Kui
- Parent: Li Yinqiu
- Education: University of Tokyo; Harvard University

Military service
- Allegiance: Republic of China
- Branch/service: Republic of China Army
- Years of service: 1927–1950
- Rank: Lieutenant General
- Battles/wars: Wuchang Uprising; Second Sino-Japanese War
- Awards: Order of the Cloud and Banner

Li Daishen (Chinese: 李待琛; pinyin: Lǐ Daìshēn; 28 September 1891 – 15 November 1959) was a Chinese educator and military officer.

== Names ==
His courtesy name was Boqin (伯芹), and his art name was Caichi (采池).

== Biography ==
Li was born in Daqiao Town of Hengshan County, Hunan, on September 28, 1891. His father, Li Yinqiu (Chinese: 李吟秋), was a local official. In 1906, he went to study at Hongwen Academy with his father, in Japan. In 1908, he returned to China after graduation.

During the Wuchang Uprising, he was an ordnance officer at the Tongmenghui army. In the autumn of 1912, he went to study in Japan again, where he was educated at the University of Tokyo, he earned his Bachelor of Engineering in 1919, by age 29. He became the chief engineer of Guangdong Arsenal in 1920. One year later, he was appointed chief engineer of Hunan Iron Factory. He received his Doctor of Metallurgy from Harvard University in 1923. He was President of Hunan University in February 1926, and held that office until July 1926. In 1927, he served as Director of the Political Department of the 40th Army of the National Revolutionary Army. At the same year, he was an engineer of Shanghai Arsenal. In 1928, he was promoted to the rank of Major General. And he was awarded Order of the Cloud and Banner in 1935, at the age of 45. In 1937, during the Second Sino-Japanese War, he was made a Lieutenant General. On August 28, 1945, he attended the Chongqing negotiation and visited the Communist leader Mao Zedong. In 1946, he was appointed the Deputy Head of the Chinese Mission to Japan, and one year later, the Chinese Representative to Japan. After the founding of the Communist state, he moved to Japan.

Li died of heart disease in Kaohsiung, Taiwan, on November 15, 1959.

== Work ==
- Modern Weapons (Chinese: 现代武器)
- After the Revolution in Russia (Chinese: 革命后之俄罗斯)
- Metallic Materials (Chinese: 金属材料)
- Manufacture of Weapons (Chinese: 军械制造)
- National Defense and Industry (Chinese: 国防与工业)
- Calculation of Weapons (Chinese: 兵器计算)
- The Structure and Theory of Weapons (Chinese: 枪炮构造及理论)
- Yingminglu (Chinese: 嘤鸣录)
- Basis of the Construction of National Defense (Chinese: 国防建设之基础)
- The Present Situation of Hainan Island (Chinese: 海南岛之现状)
- Atomic Weapons (Chinese: 原子兵器)

== Personal life ==
Li married Gan Kui (Chinese: 甘葵).

Educational offices
Preceded by Yang Maojie (杨茂杰)	President of Hunan University; 1926–1926	Succeeded by Lei Zhuhuan (雷铸寰)
Preceded by Xu Zheng (许征)	President of Chung Cheng Institute of Technology; 1934–1937	Succeeded by Liang Qiang (梁强)
