= Chen Jie (engineer) =

Chinese engineer

- 陈杰

President of Tongji University
- Incumbent
- Assumed office July 2018
- Preceded by: Wan Gang

Personal details
- Born: 8 July 1965 (age 61) Fuqing, Fujian, China
- Party: Chinese Communist Party
- Education: Beijing Institute of Technology
- Scientific career
- Fields: Control theory Control engineering
- Workplaces: Tongji University

Chinese name
- Simplified Chinese: 陈杰
- Traditional Chinese: 陳杰
Transcriptions
Standard Mandarin
- Hanyu Pinyin: Chén Jié

Chen Jie (born 8 July 1965) is a Chinese engineer who is a professor and the current president of Tongji University, and an academician of the Chinese Academy of Engineering.

== Biography ==
Chen was born in Fuqing, Fujian, on 8 July 1965. He attended the Fuqing Experimental Primary School. He secondary studied at Fuqing No. 1 High School. He earned a bachelor's degree in 1986, a master's degree in 1996, and a doctor's degree in 2001, all from Beijing Institute of Technology.

He was a visiting scholar at California State University between 1989 and 1990, a visiting research fellow at Tokyo Institute of Technology in 1993, and research fellow at the University of Birmingham from 1996 to 1997. In April 2014, he became vice president of Tongji University, rising to president in July 2018.

== Honours and awards ==
- Senior Member of the Institute of Electrical and Electronics Engineers (IEEE)
- 27 November 2017 Member of the Chinese Academy of Engineering (CAE)

Educational offices
Preceded by Wan Gang	President of Tongji University; 2018–president	Incumbent
