= Zhou Gengsheng =

Chinese politician

- 周鲠生
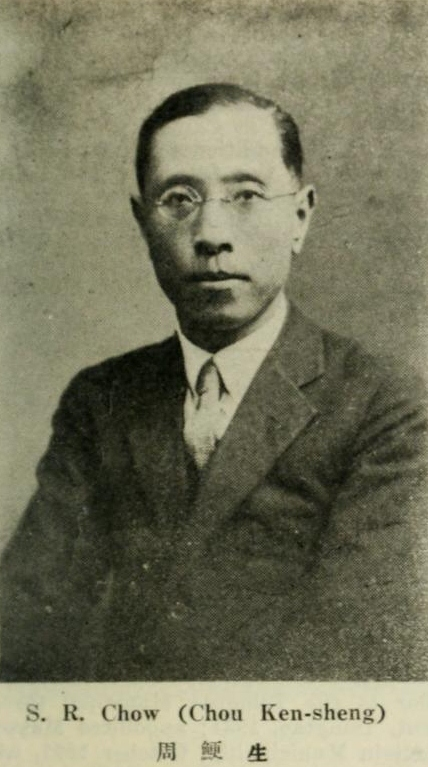
- Born: 18 March 1889; Changsha County, Hunan, Qing China
- Died: 20 April 1971 (aged 82); Beijing, People's Republic of China
- Education: Waseda University; University of Edinburgh; University of Paris
- Occupation: Jurist
- Political party: Chinese Communist Party

Zhou Gengsheng (Chinese: 周鲠生; Wades-Giles: Chou Keng-sheng 1889–1971) was a Chinese jurist, historian and academic.

== Biography ==
Born in Changsha County, Hunan, the son of a school principal, Zhou studied political economy at Waseda University in Japan (where he joined the Tongmenghui), obtained a master's degree in political economy from the University of Edinburgh in Scotland, and a doctorate in international law from the University of Paris in France.

Zhou served as professor of political science at Peking University, and professor of diplomatic history and public international law at Wuhan University. From 1945 to 1949, he was president of Wuhan University.

After the founding of the People's Republic of China in 1949, he served as vice chairman of the Central-South Military and Political Committee (which was responsible for political and military affairs in Guangdong, Hainan, Henan, Hubei and Hunan), special adviser to the Ministry of Foreign Affairs, deputy director of the Chinese People's Institute of Foreign Affairs and director of the Committee of International Treaties of the Ministry of Foreign Affairs.

A personal friend of Zhou Enlai, he was accepted as a member of the Chinese Communist Party in 1956.
