= First Middle School of Changsha =

Coordinates: 28°14′25″N 112°59′15″E

- Changsha, Hunan Province; China

Information
- School type: Secondary
- Motto: Fair-mindedness, Bravery, Diligence, and Plainness
- Established: 1912
- School district: Qingshuitang, Changsha
- President: Liao Dequan
- Grades: 7th through 12th
- Website: www.hnfms.com.cn

The First Middle School of Changsha (simplified Chinese: 长沙市第一中学；traditional Chinese: 長沙市第一中學), colloquially known as First Middle School of Changsha, is a senior secondary school (7th through 12th grades) located in Changsha, Hunan Province, China. The school has been ranked No. 1 among the high schools in Hunan Province. It is directly subordinated by the Provincial Education Department and has been received the titles of Provincial Civilized Unit, National Key School of Sports Reserve Talent Training, Provincial Advanced Unit of Moral Education.

== History ==
Established in 1912, the First High School of Changsha, Hunan is the earliest state-owned middle school in the province. The founder and first President of the school is Fu Dingyi. The original address of the school was Changsha Zidong Yuan (now No. 4 and No. 5 Minzhu Hou Street). The name of the school had been changed several times. In 1946, the school was moved to Qingshuitang, Changsha. The current name of the school, "First High School of Changsha", was officially used in 1952.

== Academics ==
The school is regarded as one of the "Famous Four", a group of academically selective high schools in China, alongside Yali High School, Changjun High School and High School Attached to Hunan Normal University. The school is one of the nation's first-tier key schools and the admission process is extremely competitive. For all students, there are four required courses including Chinese, Math, English, and Physical education. The school's official guiding principle is "Gearing to Modernization, Gearing to the World, Gearing to the Future", and its official aim is "Moral Education, Devoted to Teaching, Led by Teaching Research and Quality First".

Graduates of the First High School of Changsha score among the highest in China’s college entrance examinations. In recent years, its students have been accepted by top US institutions such as Harvard University, MIT, Stanford University, UC Berkeley, Princeton, and Yale University.

== Sports and arts ==
The school’s man basketball team and soccer team has won the first place in several national tournaments. Two gold medals and ten silver medals were won recently in the international sports competitions. Li Xiang, who is a famous TV show host, graduated from the school.

== Alumni ==
Graduates from the First High School of Changsha include the founding father of the People's Republic of China, Chairman Mao Zedong, the former Premier of People's Republic of China Zhu Rongji, the Vice Chairperson of the Standing Committee of the National People's Congress Zhou Gucheng, the novelist and translator Zhou Libo, the economist Yang Xiaokai, the composer and conductor Tan Dun, and 17 members of the Chinese Academy of Sciences and the Chinese Academy of Engineering.

== Former presidents ==
Fu Dingyi 1912.3–End of 1912
Yin Jiqin 1914.1–1914.6
Shi Wenyao 1914.7–1916.6
Liu Jingyi 1916.8–1917.2
Tang Tingyi 1917.2–1917.8
Liu Wu 1917.8–1918.9
Huang Zhen 1918.9–1920.6
Luo Jiaoduo 1920.8–1921.8
Tong Wenbao 1921.8–1925.1
Fang Kuojun 1925.1–1926.7
Zhang Tanran 1926.7–1927.1
Luo Yuxiong 1927.1–1927.5
Wu Jianzhen1928.4–1929.9
Liao Yunan 1929.9–1931.3
Yu Xianli1931.3–1931.12
Peng Jinyun 1932—1933
Wu Huihua 1933—1940
Zhang Zan 1940.9–1940
Guo Kun 1942—1942
Qian Qiwei 1943—194
Zhang Haisun 1944—1945.9
Gong Lichu 1945—1947.8
Zhou Shifu 1947—948.8
Liu lizhong 1948—1949.9
hen Runquan 1950—1952.10
Zhu Jiusi 1952.10—1953.4
Yuan Zongkai 1953.4–1972
Tan Qicheng 1967.11—1970.7
Huang Renling 1970.8–1971.4
Lizhenguo 1971.5–1974.5
Li Diguang 1981.5–1984
Ma Qingze 1985.4–1999.2
Yu Zeping 1999.2–2003
Zhao Yaqian 2003 to 2014
Liao Dequan 2014 to present

== Bibliography ==
- Li, Bin (2014). Hand over the school to a young journalist's Chinese education (in Chinese). Beijing: Educational Science Press. ISBN 978-7-5041-7748-3.
- He, Linheng; He, Xueying (2016). The University Town belongs to the 18-year-old city of 18 universities (in Chinese). Zhongqing: Chongqing Publishing House. ISBN 978-7-229-09278-8.
- Lee, Sharon (June 9, 2006). "The First High School of Changsha, Hunan". Rednet (in Chinese). Archived from the original on 4 March 2016.
