= Shenyang Pharmaceutical University =

University in Shenyang, China

Coordinates: 41.7694°N 123.4461°E

- 沈阳药科大学
- Established: 1931
- Location: Shenyang, Liaoning, China

Shenyang Pharmaceutical University (Chinese: 沈阳药科大学; pinyin: Shěnyáng Yàokē Dàxué; SPU) is a university in Shenyang, Liaoning, China. It is the first research institute in pharmaceutical sciences in China.

== History ==
Shenyang Pharmaceutical University has traditions that have brought it to prominence as one of two comprehensive pharmaceutical universities in China. It started at Ruijin in the Jiangxi in 1931 and moved to its present location on the banks of the Hun River in Shenyang, Liaoning in 1949.

== Academics ==
SPU has developed into a multidisciplinary, multilevel and multiform institute of higher learning, covering wide and diverse majors in pharmaceutical study. It consists of the schools of Pharmacy, Pharmaceutical engineering, Traditional Chinese Medicines, Business Administration, Basic Courses, and Adult Education. SPU has been authorized to confer master's and doctor's degrees and to enroll students from Hong Kong, Macau, Taiwan, as well as other countries.

SPU has resources that facilitate learning: The Institute of Material Medicine; The Institute of Pharmaceutical Education of Higher Learning; The Computer Center; The Audio-visual Education Program Center; The Center of Instrumental Analysis; The Botanical Garden of Medicinal Herbs, and a subsidiary pharmaceutical factory.

SPU has a staff of 1,111; among them there are 394 full-time teachers. The student population has grown to more than 7,000. There is one academician of the Chinese Academy of Engineering, over 182 professors and associate professors (nearly one-quarter of them have work experience abroad, nearly one-third have doctorates).

More than 3,000 academic papers have been published by SPU academics on research toward recommended dosages of pharmaceutical preparations, polyphase liposomes and solid preparations, on chemical and active components of traditional Chinese medicines and natural drugs, on the distinction and properties of chemical models of traditional Chinese medicines and the study of their quality control. This scientific exploration is at the forefront of research in China.

In recent years, mutually beneficial collaborative efforts have come to fruition between the university's academics and all levels of government: city, province, and state.

In March 2025, SPU established an agreement for exchanging students with Campbell University.

== See also ==
- Pharmacy in China
- Pharmaceutical industry in China
