= Wu Chinese-speaking people =

Han Chinese subdivision

Wuyue Chinese 吳越民系
Total population
- 80,102,480 (2013)

Regions with significant populations
- People's Republic of China: Zhejiang; Jiangsu; Shanghai; Anhui; Jiangxi; Fujian; Hong Kong; Macau
- Republic of China (on Taiwan): As part of Waishengren population
- United States: As part of Chinese American population
- Canada: As part of Chinese Canadian population
- Australia: As part of Chinese Australian population
- Italy: Majority of Chinese people in Italy
- France: Majority of Chinese people in France
- Singapore: As part of Chinese Singaporean population

Languages
- Wu Chinese and Mandarin Chinese

Religion
- Mahayana Buddhism, Confucianism, Taoism, Folk religion. Small Christian minorities.

Related ethnic groups
- Other Han Chinese subgroups

The Wuyue people, also known as Wu Chinese-speaking people (simplified Chinese: 吴越民系; traditional Chinese: 吳越民系; pinyin: Wúyuè mínxì, Shanghainese: Wu Chinese pronunciation: [ŋ̩˨˩ɦyɪʔ˥ min˩˧ɕi˥˩]), are a Han Chinese ethnolinguistic subgroup native to Jiangnan. They are a Wu Chinese-speaking people who hail from southern Jiangsu Province, the entirety of the city of Shanghai and all of Zhejiang Province, as well as smaller populations in Xuancheng prefecture-level city in southern Anhui Province, Shangrao, Guangfeng and Yushan counties of northeastern Jiangxi Province and some parts of Pucheng County in northern Fujian Province.

== History ==
=== Origins ===
For much of its history and prehistory, the Wuyue region has been home to several neolithic cultures such as the Hemudu culture, Majiabang culture and the Liangzhu culture. Both Wu and Yue were two kingdoms during the Zhou dynasty and many such allusions to those kingdoms were attributed in the Spring and Autumn Annals, the Zuo Zhuan and the Guoyu. Later, after years of fighting and conflict, the two cultures of Wu and Yue became one culture through mutual contact and cultural diffusion. The Chu state from the west (in Hubei) expanded into this area and defeated the Yue state.

After Chu was conquered by Qin, China was unified. It was not until the fall of Western Jin during the early 4th century AD that northern Chinese moved to Jiangnan in significant numbers. The Yellow River valley was becoming barren due to flooding, lack of trees after intensive logging to create farmland and constant warfare during the upheaval of the Five Barbarians.

In the 10th century, Wuyue (Ten Kingdoms) was a small coastal kingdom founded by Qian Liu who made a lasting cultural impact on Jiangnan and its people to this day. The cultural distinctiveness that began developing over this period persists to this day as the Wuyue region speaks a branch of the Chinese language called Wu (the most famous dialect of which is Shanghainese), has distinctive cuisine and other cultural traits.

There have been many periods of mass-migrations to Wuyue areas from Northern China, sometimes overtaking the local Wuyue population. One notable example of this was when the Song dynasty fell in the north, large numbers of northern refugees flooded into the relocated capital Hangzhou mainly from the areas that are currently under the administration of modern-day Henan Province. Within just 30 years, contemporary accounts record that these Northern immigrants outnumbered the Wu natives of Hangzhou, altering the city's spoken dialect and culture.

== Subgroups ==
- Shanghainese people
- Wenzhou people

== Culture ==
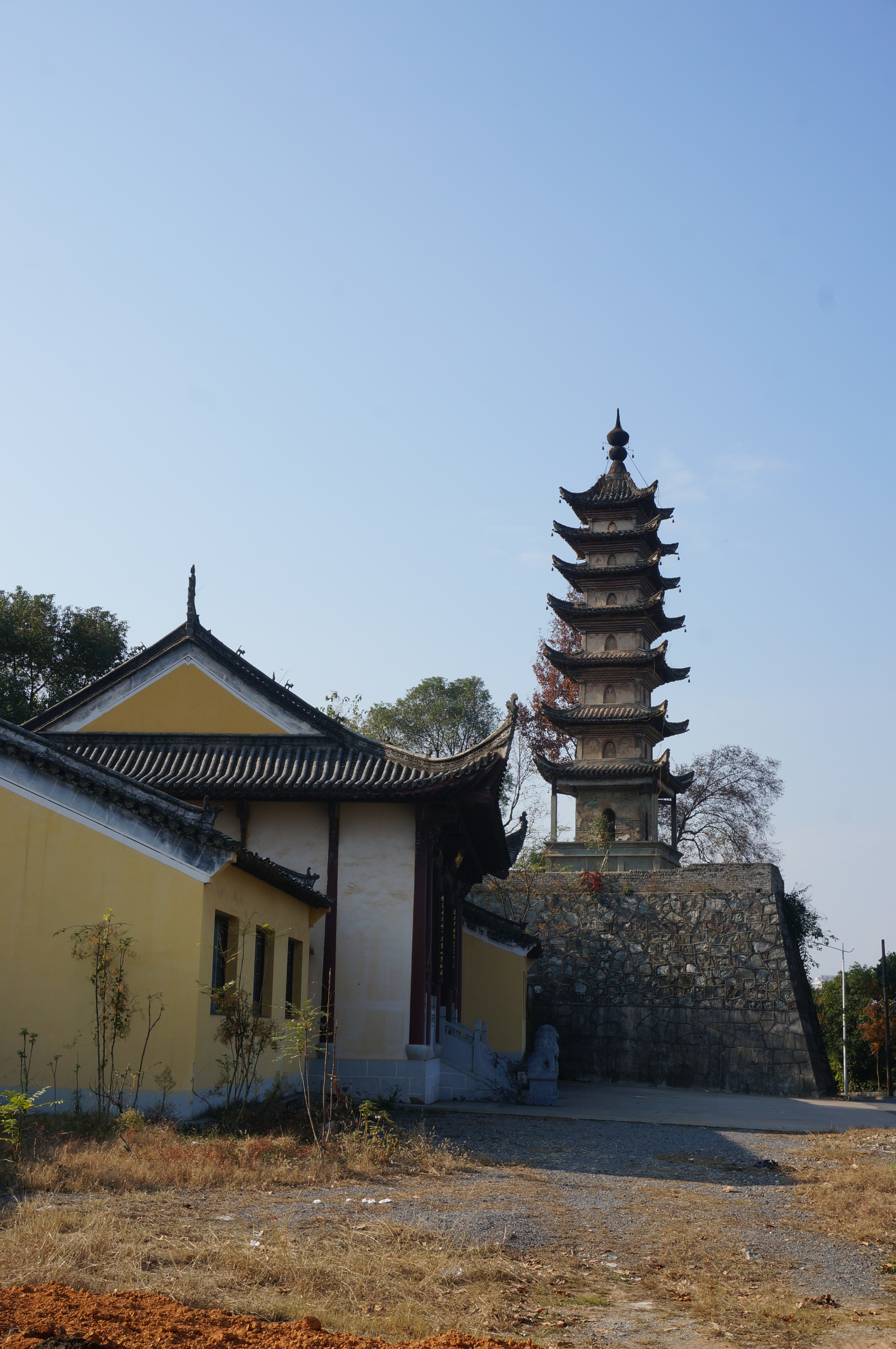
Wu architecture styled pagoda.

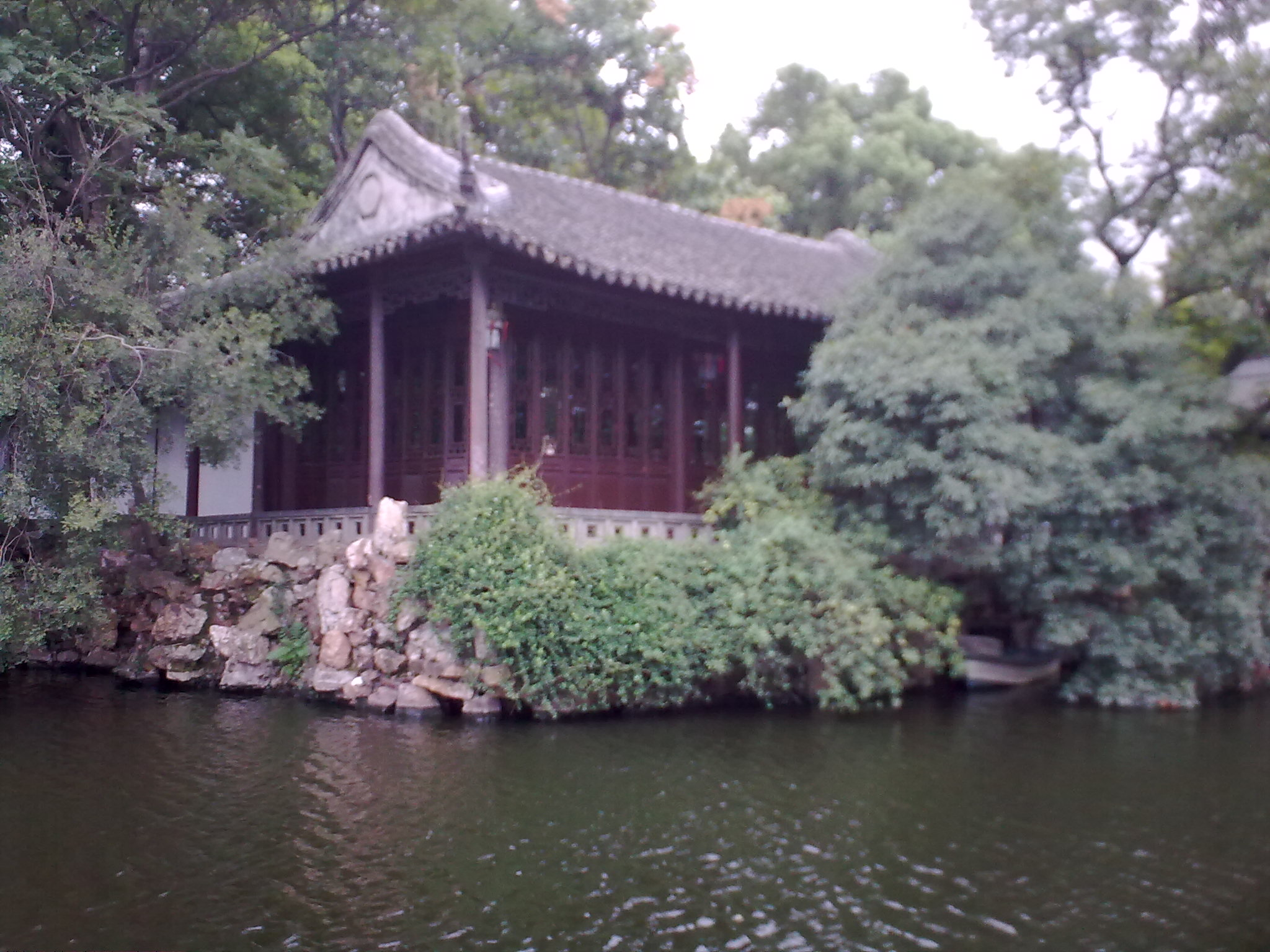
Canglang Pavilion in Suzhou.

=== Education ===
Traditionally, in the past, Wu Chinese-speaking people dominated the imperial examinations and were often ranked first in the imperial examinations as Zhuangyuan (狀元), or in other positions of the Jinshi (進士) degree. The Wu Chinese-speaking region produced 59 out of 114 Zhuangyuan scholars during the Ming and Qing dynasty, and 10427 out of 51444 Jinshi scholars, despite currently only constituting 6% of China's population. Amongst the 2331 scholars promoted to the Chinese Academy of Sciences and Chinese Academy of Engineering since the institutions' establishment from 1955, over 30% are Wuyue people, with 450 are from Jiangsu, 375 are from Zhejiang, 84 are from Shanghai. In addition, 5 out of 12 Nobel laureates who are of Chinese descent are Wuyue people, including Tsung Dao Lee, Charles Kao, Steven Chu, Roger Tsien and Youyou Tu.

=== Languages ===
- Changzhou dialect
- Hangzhou dialect
- Huzhou dialect
- Jinhua dialect
- Ningbo dialect
- Shanghainese dialect
- Shaoxing dialect
- Suzhou dialect
- Wenzhounese dialect
- Wuxi dialect

=== Music ===
- Jiangnan sizhu
- Suzhou Pingtan (originated from Suzhou)

=== Opera ===
Kunqu and Yue opera are amongst the most popular form of traditional opera in China, second to Peking Opera only.

- Kunqu
- Yue opera
- Shanghai opera
- Yongju, or Ningbo opera

=== Literature ===
- Wo Bau-Sae
- Butterfly Lovers (梁山伯與祝英台)
- Legend of the White Snake (白蛇傳)
- Dream of the Red Chamber

=== Philosophy and Religion ===
- Yangming school of Neo-Confucianism
- Tiantai school of Mahayana Buddhism

=== Architecture Heritage Sites ===
- Tianyi Chamber
- The Classical Gardens in Suzhou

=== Cultural Items ===
- Silk, Jiangnan is the largest silk-producing region in China. Huzhou is known for its fine silk.
- Tea (Camellia sinensis), Hangzhou is known for its Longjing tea, and the rest of Jiangnan has their own unique tea varieties.
- Suzhou embroidery
- Shaoxing wine

== DNA analysis ==
The HLA-DRB1 distribution of Jiangsu-Zhejiang-Shanghai Han population does share genetic characteristics with other Han Chinese populations, but it also exhibits its own characteristics distinct from that of other Han Chinese populations. This study also suggests that Wu-speaking peoples genetically, bridge the gap between Northern Han and Southern Han populations and thus are an intermediate between both populations. Even though Wu-speaking peoples form a genetic cluster, DNA analyses also show that Wu-speaking peoples are genetically coherent with other Han Chinese populations.

== Notable Wu Chinese-speaking people ==
=== Scientists and inventors ===
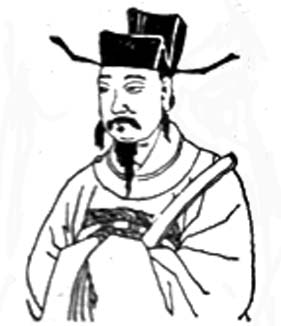
Shen Kuo, a brilliant polymathic scientist and mathematician of the Song dynasty.

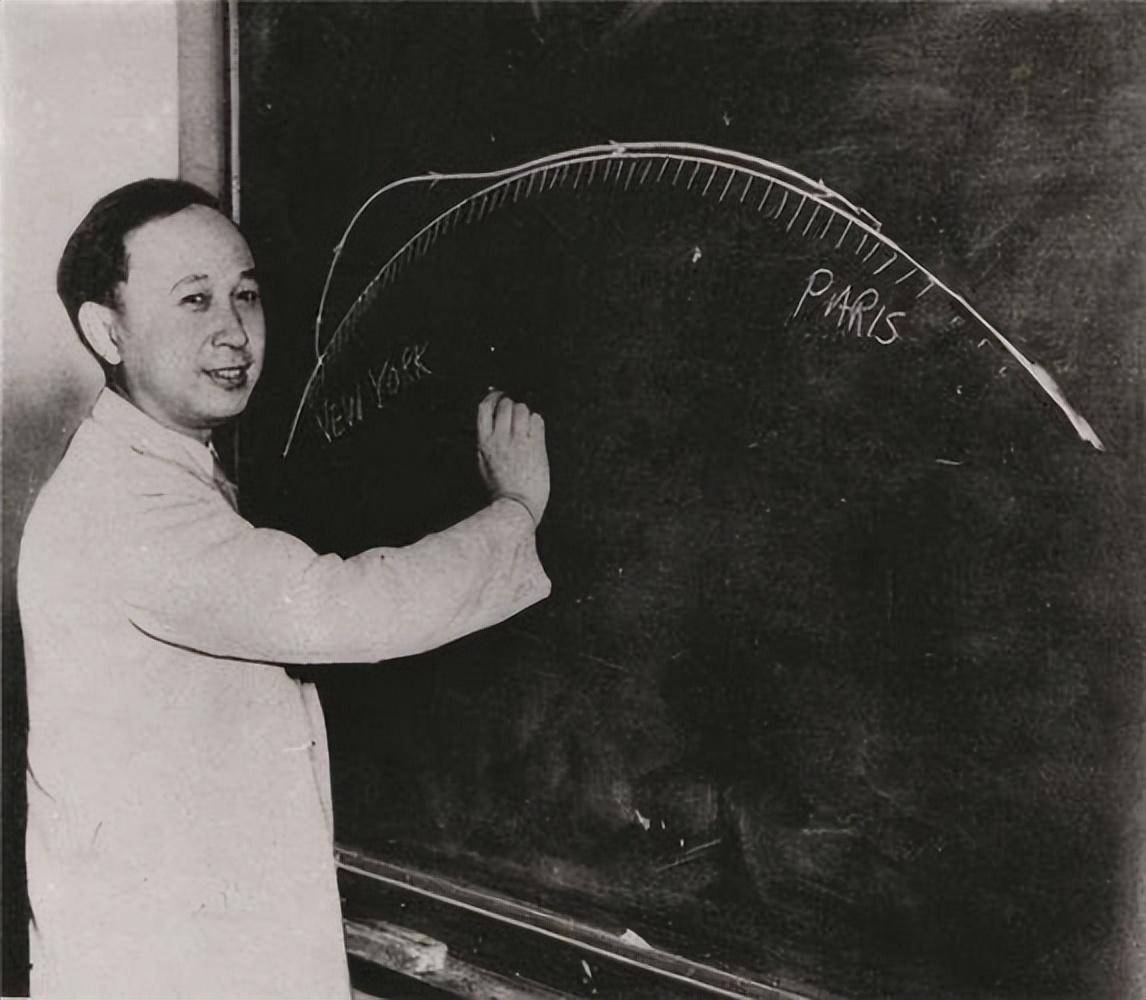
Qian Xuesen, the father of Chinese space program.

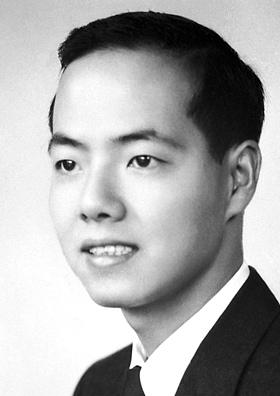
Tsung-Dao Lee, one of the first two Chinese Nobel prize laureates in Physics.

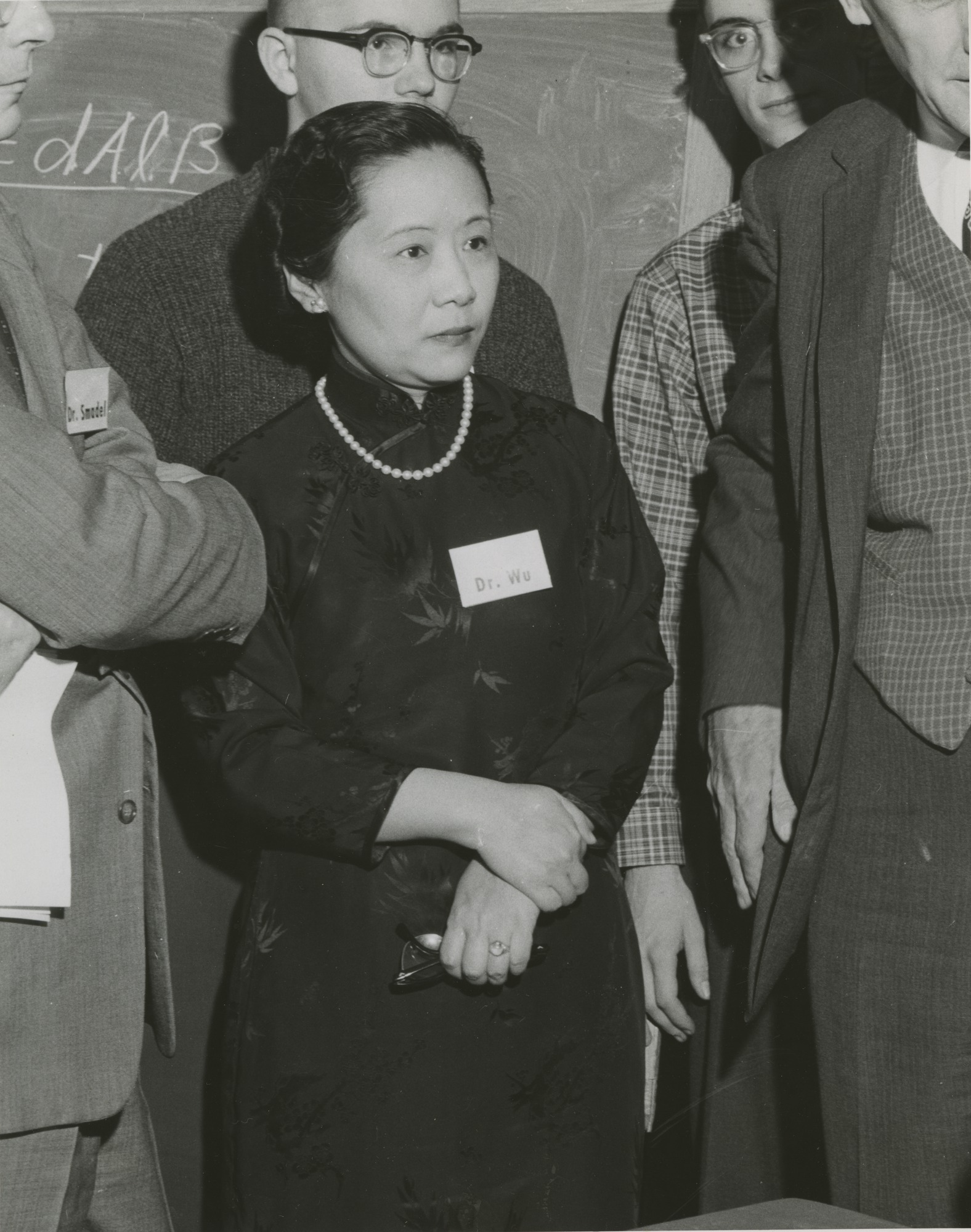
Chien-Shiung Wu, the first recipient of the Wolf Prize in Physics.

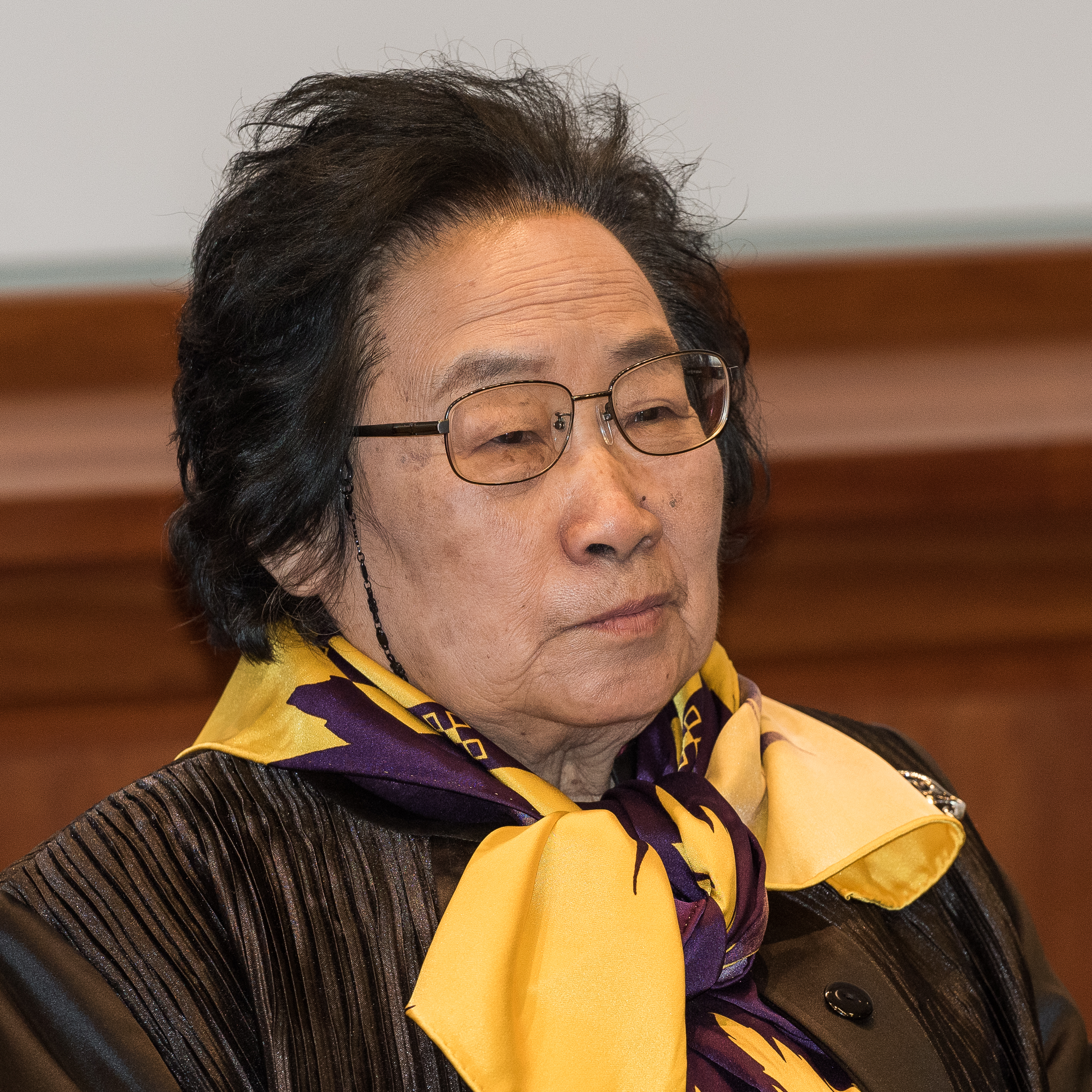
Tu Youyou, the first Chinese Nobel prize laureate in Physiology or Medicine.
- Shen Kuo (1031–1095), a brilliant polymathic scientist and mathematician of the Song dynasty.
- Xu Guangqi (1562–1633), Chinese mathematician, agricultural scientist, astronomer, and scholar-bureaucrat under the Ming dynasty.
- Wang Ganchang (1907–1998), one of the founding fathers of Chinese nuclear physics, cosmic rays and particle physics.
- Tan Jiazhen (1909–2008), Chinese geneticist and the main founder of modern Chinese genetics.
- Qian Xuesen (1911–2009), the father of Chinese space program, Qian was praised by Theodore von Kármán who said that Qian "answered my questions with unusual precision. I was immediately impressed with the keenness and quickness of his (Qian's) mind."
- Chien-Shiung Wu (1912–1997), an experimental physicist, she was known as "the First Lady of Physics" for her contributions to nuclear physics and was the first recipient of the Wolf Prize in Physics.
- Chien Wei-zang (1912–2010), an applied mathematician and physicist.
- He Zehui (1914–2011), a Chinese nuclear physicist who worked to develop and exploit nuclear physics in China.
- Shao Xianghua (1913–2012), Chinese scientist and metallurgical engineer. He was considered as a pioneer of modern Chinese metallurgical engineering.

Tsung-Dao Lee (1926–2024), Nobel prize laureate in Physics (1956).

- Li Zhijian (1928–2011), the pioneer of Chinese microelectronics.

Tu Youyou (1930–), Nobel prize laureate in Physiology or Medicine (2015).

Charles K. Kao (1933–), Nobel prize laureate in Physics (2009).

- Ni Guangjiong (1934–), Chinese physicist and science writer.
- Gu Leguan (1935–2001), a Chinese physicist and educator, he was also the former president of Chongqing University.
- Li Sanli (1935–), one of China's pioneers in computer science and engineering. He has won many domestic awards for research in the fields of computer architecture and organization.
- Zhou Chaochen (1937–), Chinese computer scientist and inventor of the Duration calculus.
- Andrew Yao (1946–), a Chinese computer scientist and computational theorist. His contributions include proving what is now known as Yao's Principle.
- Ho-Kwang Mao (1947–), an eminent scientist and geologist in America.
- Jiawei Han, (1949–), Chinese computer scientist and Abel Bliss Professor in the Department of Computer Science at the University of Illinois at Urbana-Champaign.

Roger Y. Tsien (1952–2016), Nobel prize laureate in Chemistry (2009), Tsien was praised for being immensely intelligent by Herman Quirmbach who said "It's probably not an exaggeration to say he(Roger Y. Tsien)'s the smartest person I ever met... [a]nd I have met a lot of brilliant people".

- Junying Yu (1975–), is a stem cell biologist and researcher at the University of Wisconsin–Madison.

=== Leaders and politicians ===
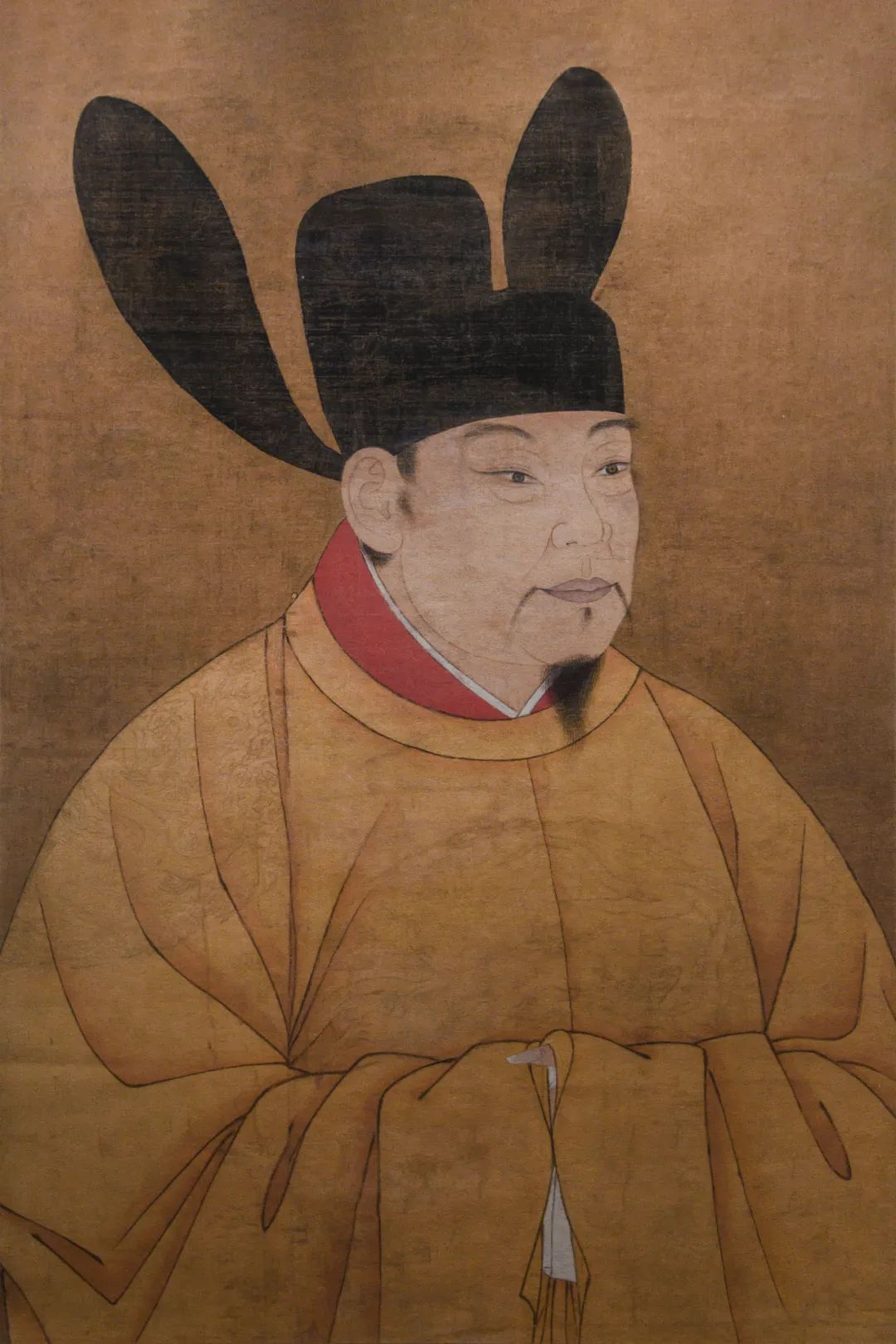
Qian Liu, the first ruler of Wuyue kingdom.

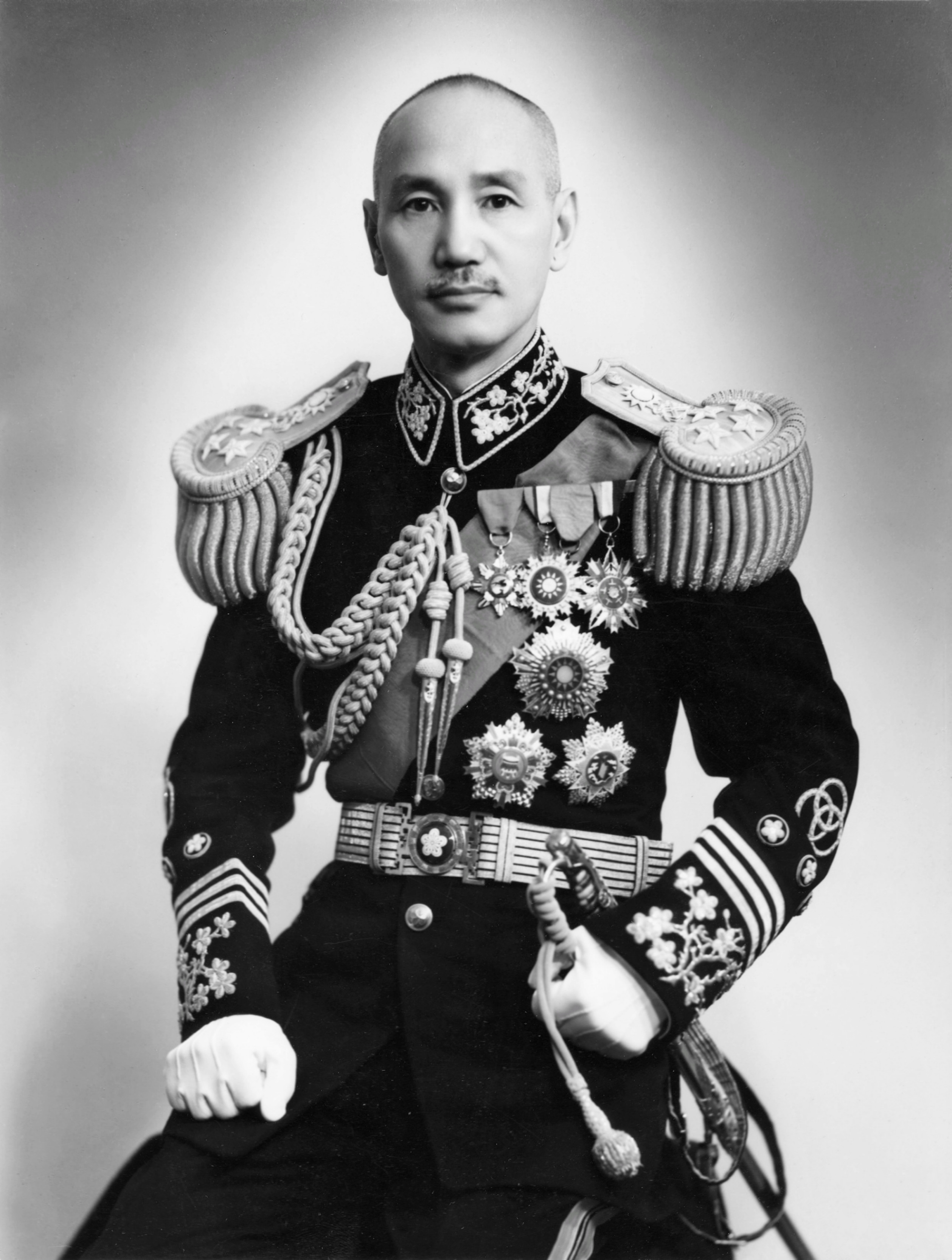
Chiang Kai-shek, former president of the Republic of China in Mainland China and Taiwan.

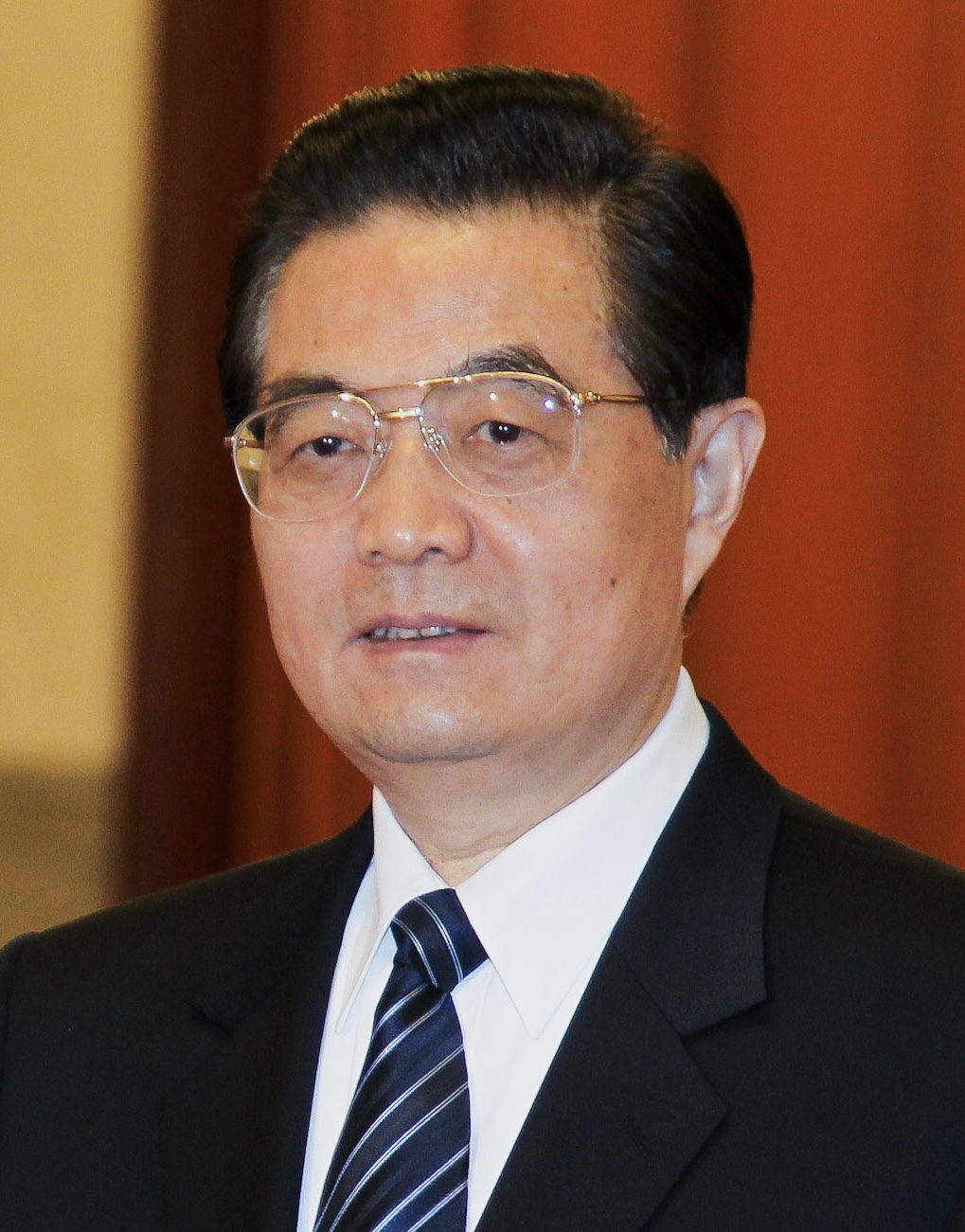
Hu Jintao, former president of the People's Republic of China.

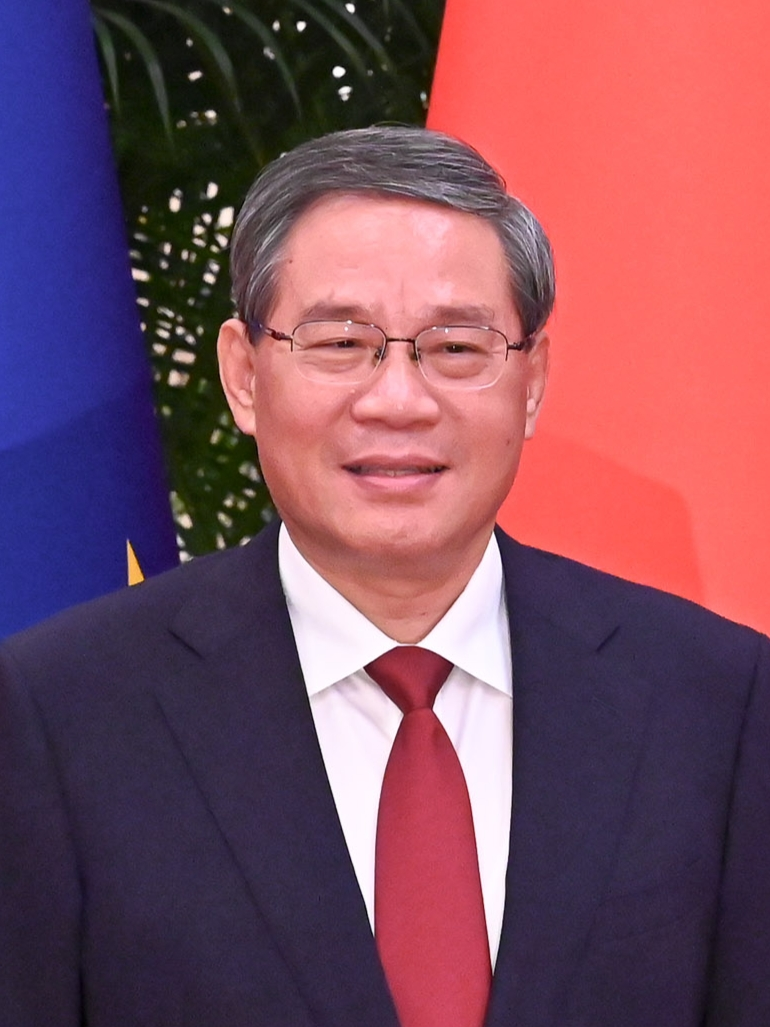
Li Qiang, the current premier of the People's Republic of China.
- Qian Liu (852–932), founder and first king of Wuyue.
- Qian Yuanguan (887–941), second king of Wuyue.
- Sun Baoqi (1867–1931), the Qing governor of Shandong Province and the premier of the Republic of China.
- Chiang Kai-shek (1887–1975), President of the Republic of China in Mainland China and Taiwan.
- Chiang Ching-kuo (1910–1988), President of Republic of China (Taiwan).
- Sang Guowei (1941–), former chairman of the Chinese Peasants' and Workers' Democratic Party.
- Hu Jintao (1942–), former president of the People's Republic of China.
- Han Zheng (1955–), current vice president of the People's Republic of China.
- Wang Huning (1955–), current chairman of the Chinese People's Political Consultative Conference.
- Li Qiang (1958–), current premier of the People's Republic of China.
- Ding Xuexiang (1962–), current first Vice Premier of the People's Republic of China.

=== Businesspeople and entrepreneurs ===
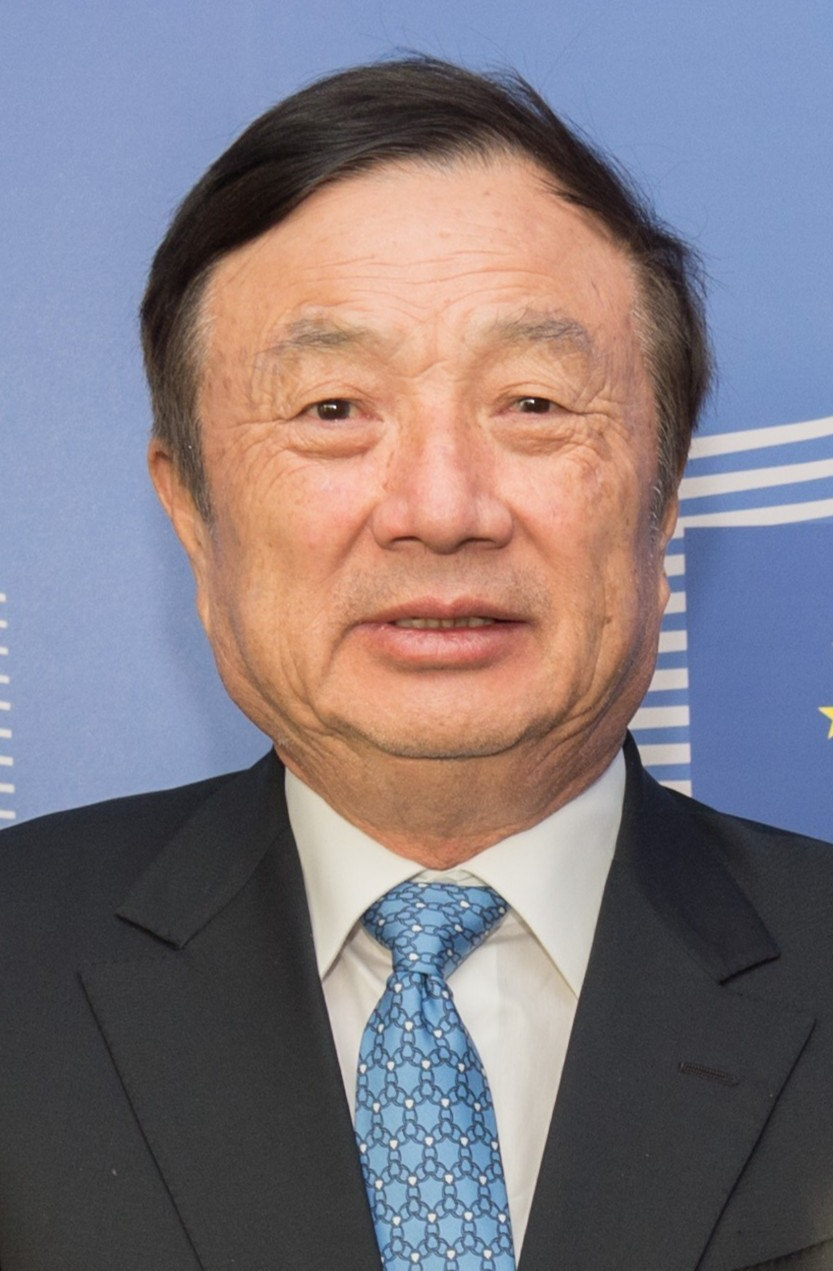
Ren Zhengfei, founder and CEO of Huawei.

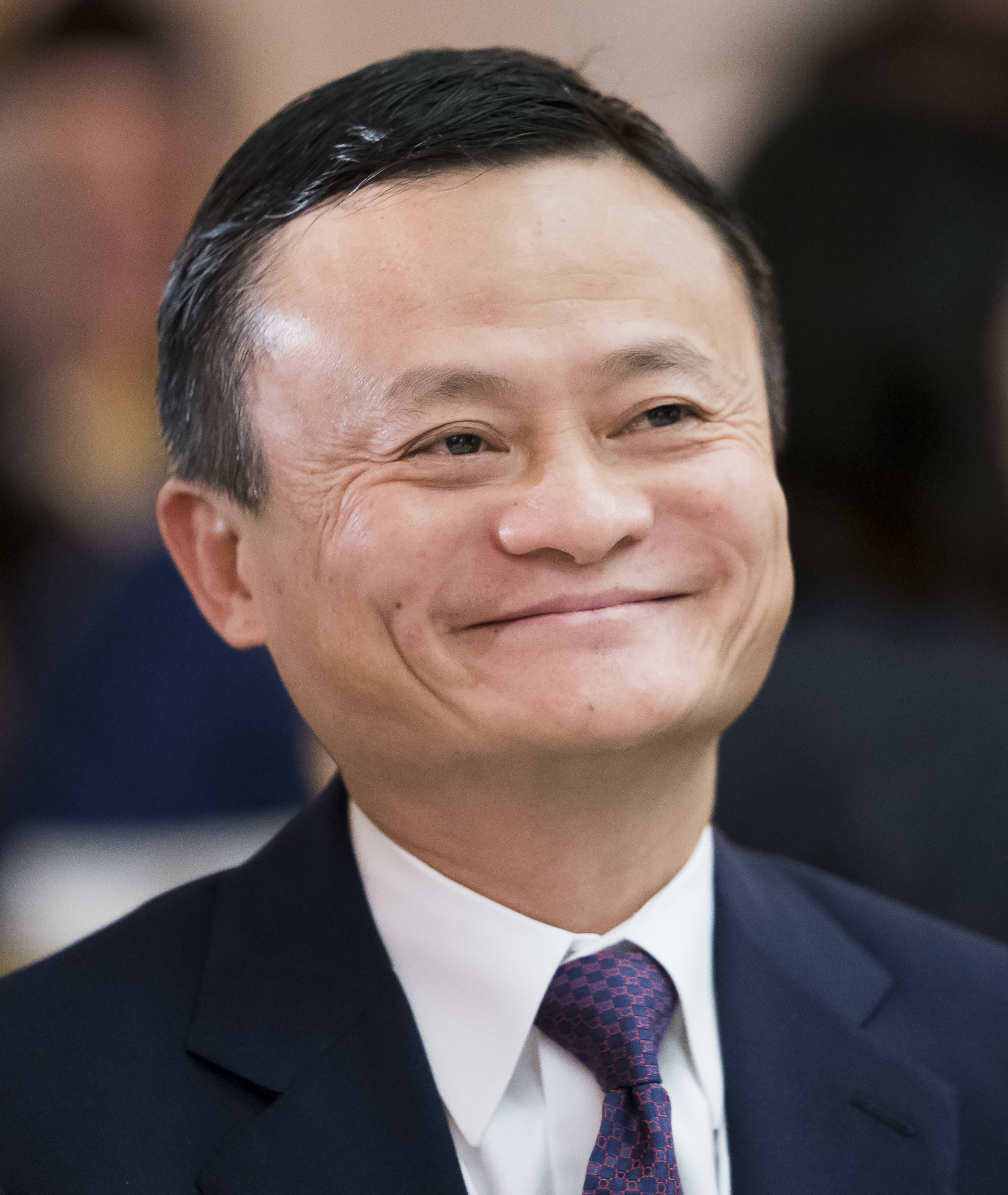
Jack Ma, co-founder of Alibaba Group.
- Ren Zhengfei (1944–), an entrepreneur and engineer. Founder and CEO of Huawei.
- Zhong Shanshan (1954–), an entrepreneur. Founder and chairperson of beverage company Nongfu Spring.
- Jack Ma (1964–), a businessman, investor and philanthropist . Co-founder of Alibaba Group.
- Colin Huang (1980–), a businessman, investor and philanthropist. Founder of e-commerce company Pinduoduo.
- Frank Wang (1980–), an entrepreneur and aerospace engineer. Founder and CEO of the technology company DJI.

=== Sportspeople ===
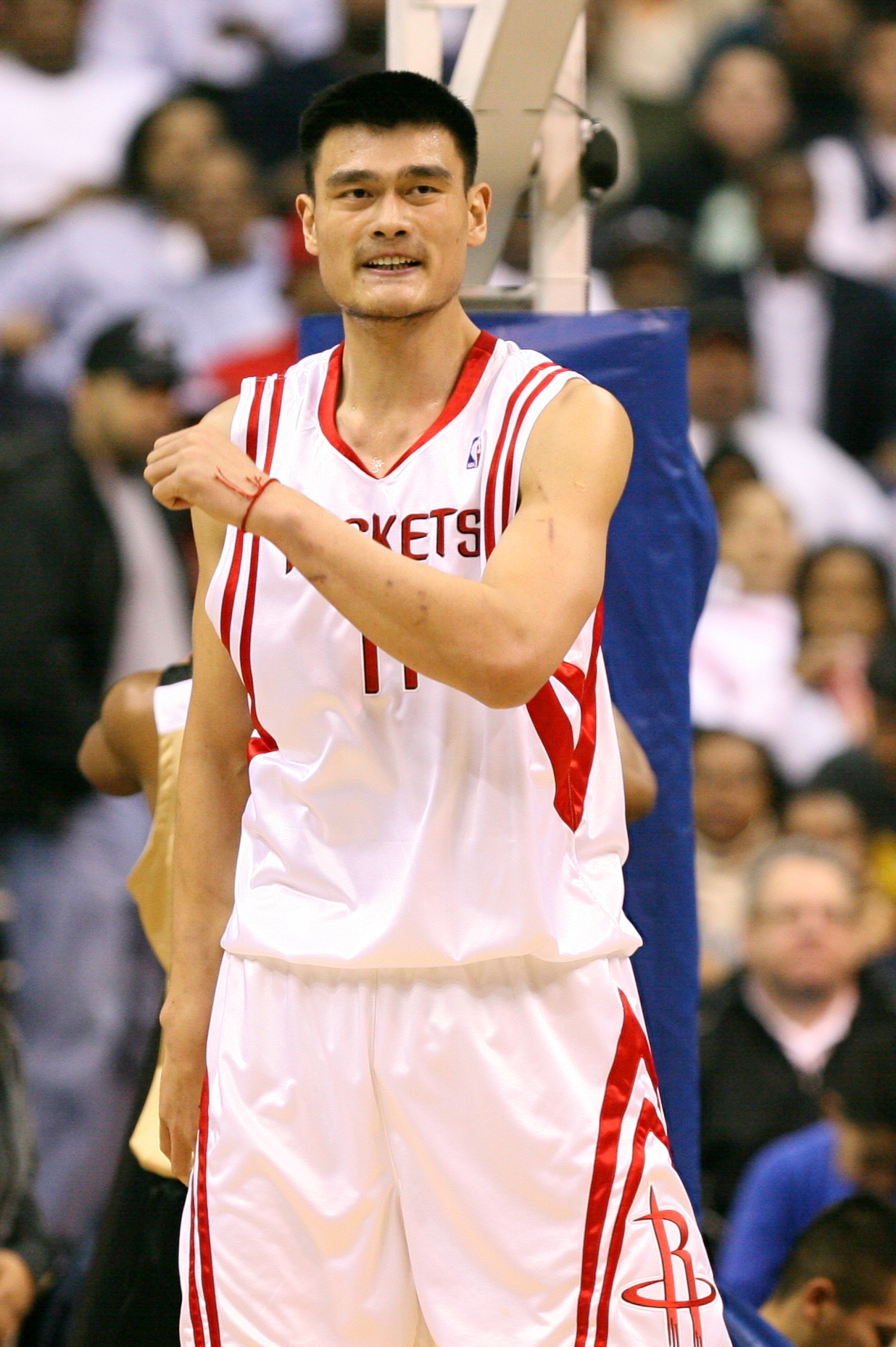
Yao Ming, former professional basketball player for the Houston Rockets.

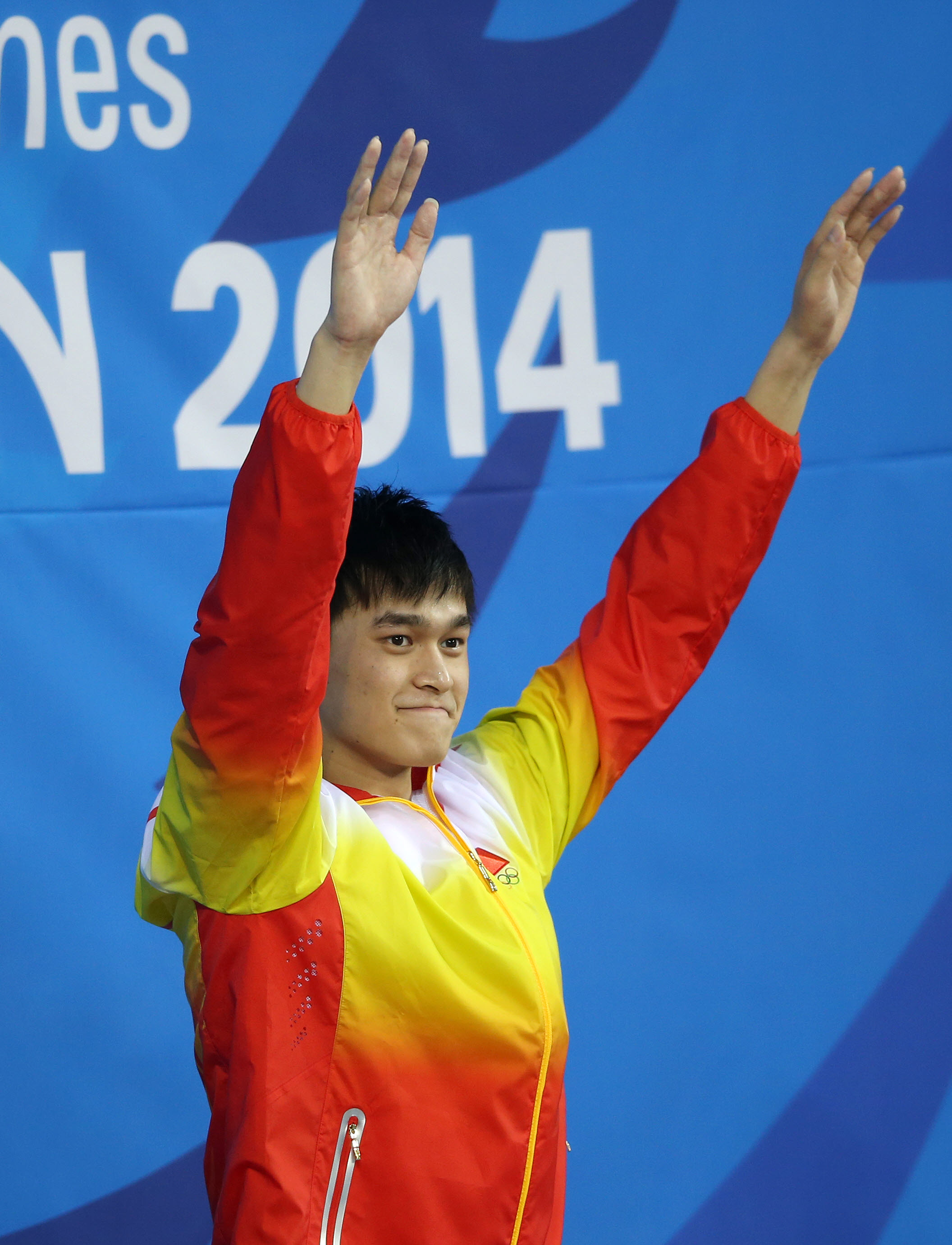
Sun Yang, considered to be one of the 'greatest freestyle swimmers of all time'.

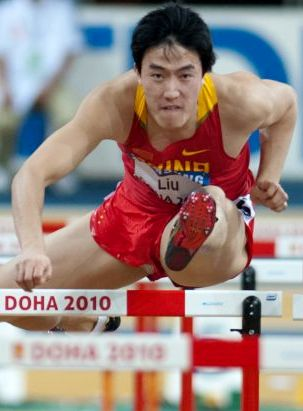
Liu Xiang, Olympic Gold medallist and World Champion in the 110 metres hurdles.

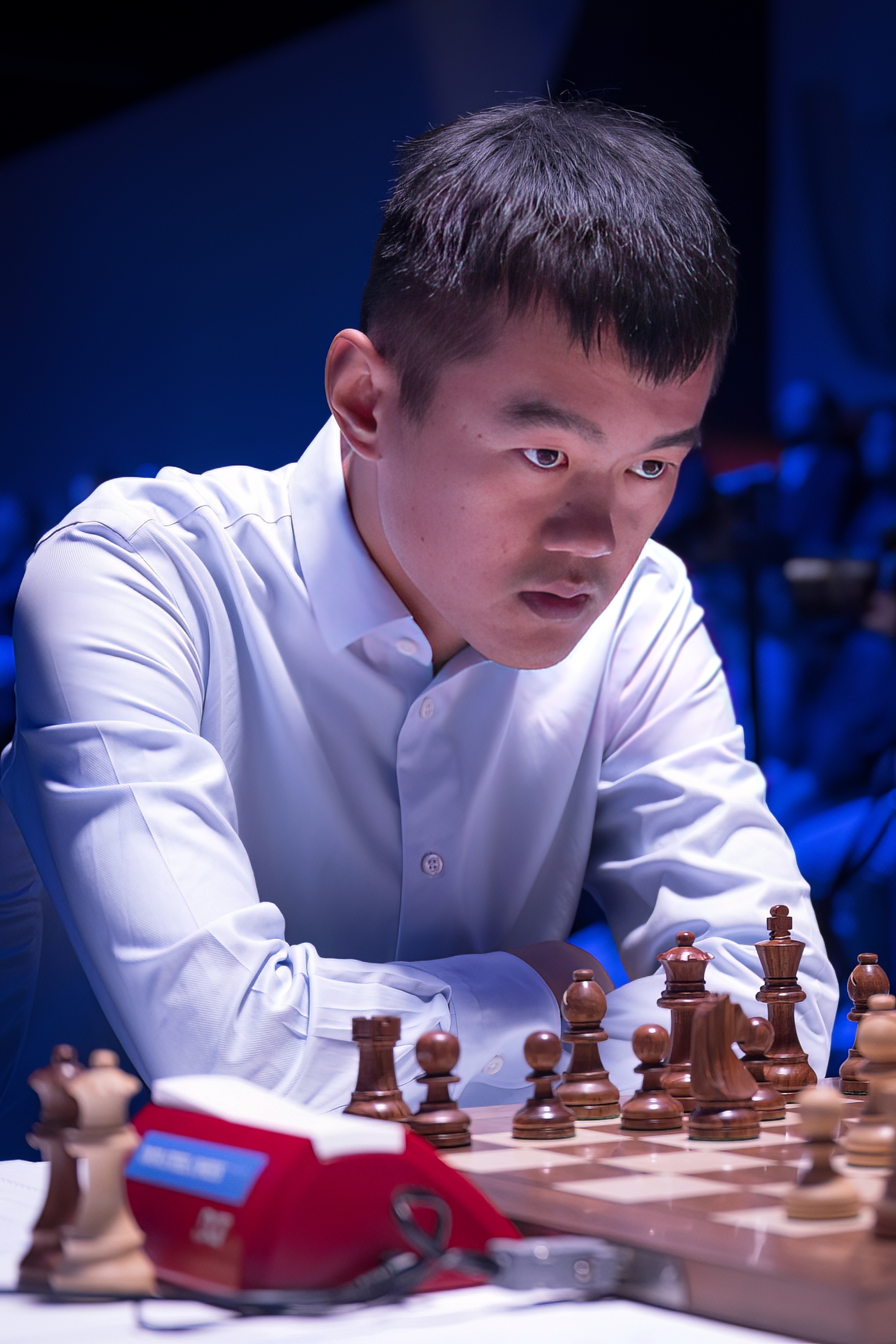
Ding Liren, the current World Chess Champion.

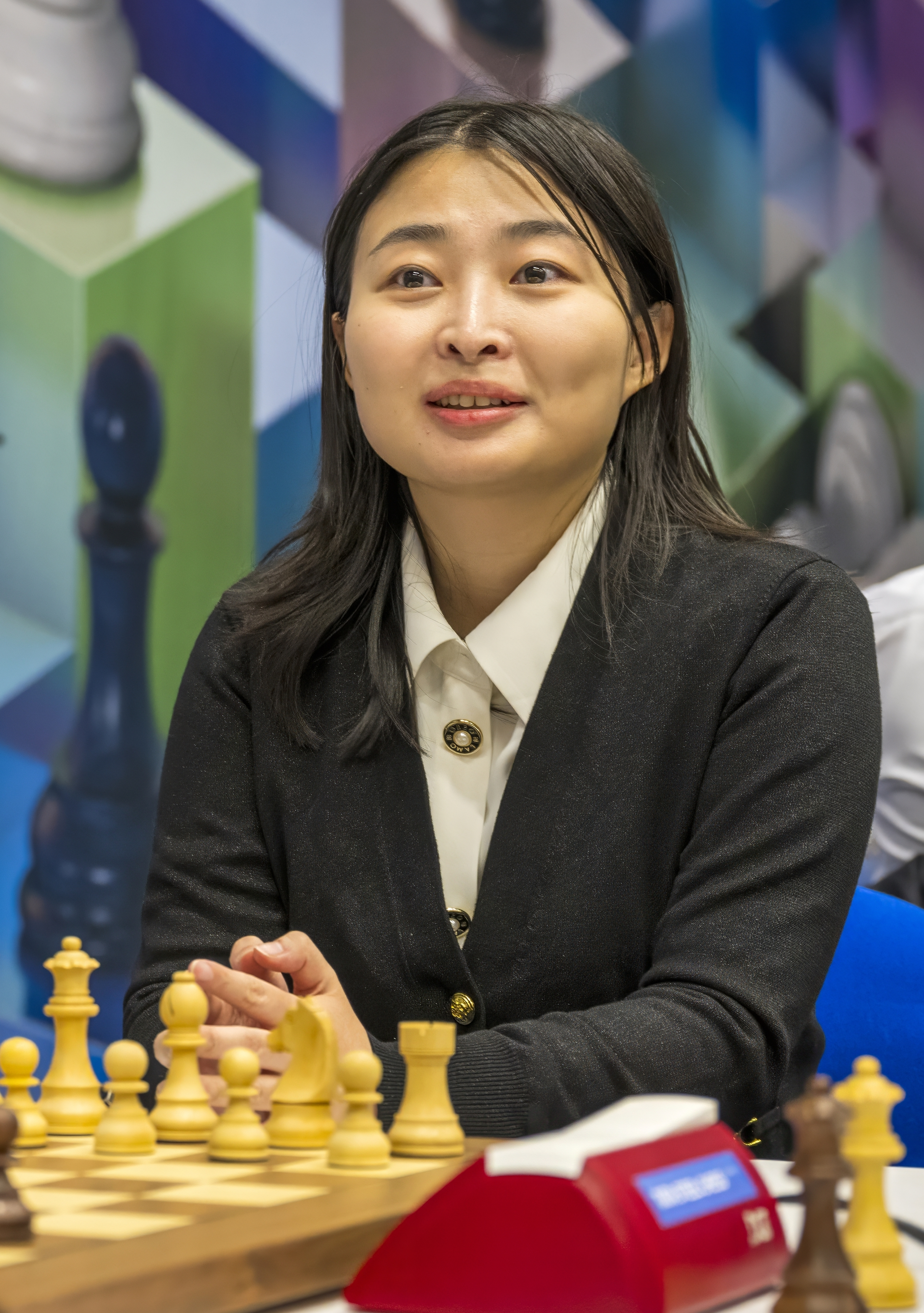
Ju Wenjun, the current Women's World Chess Champion.

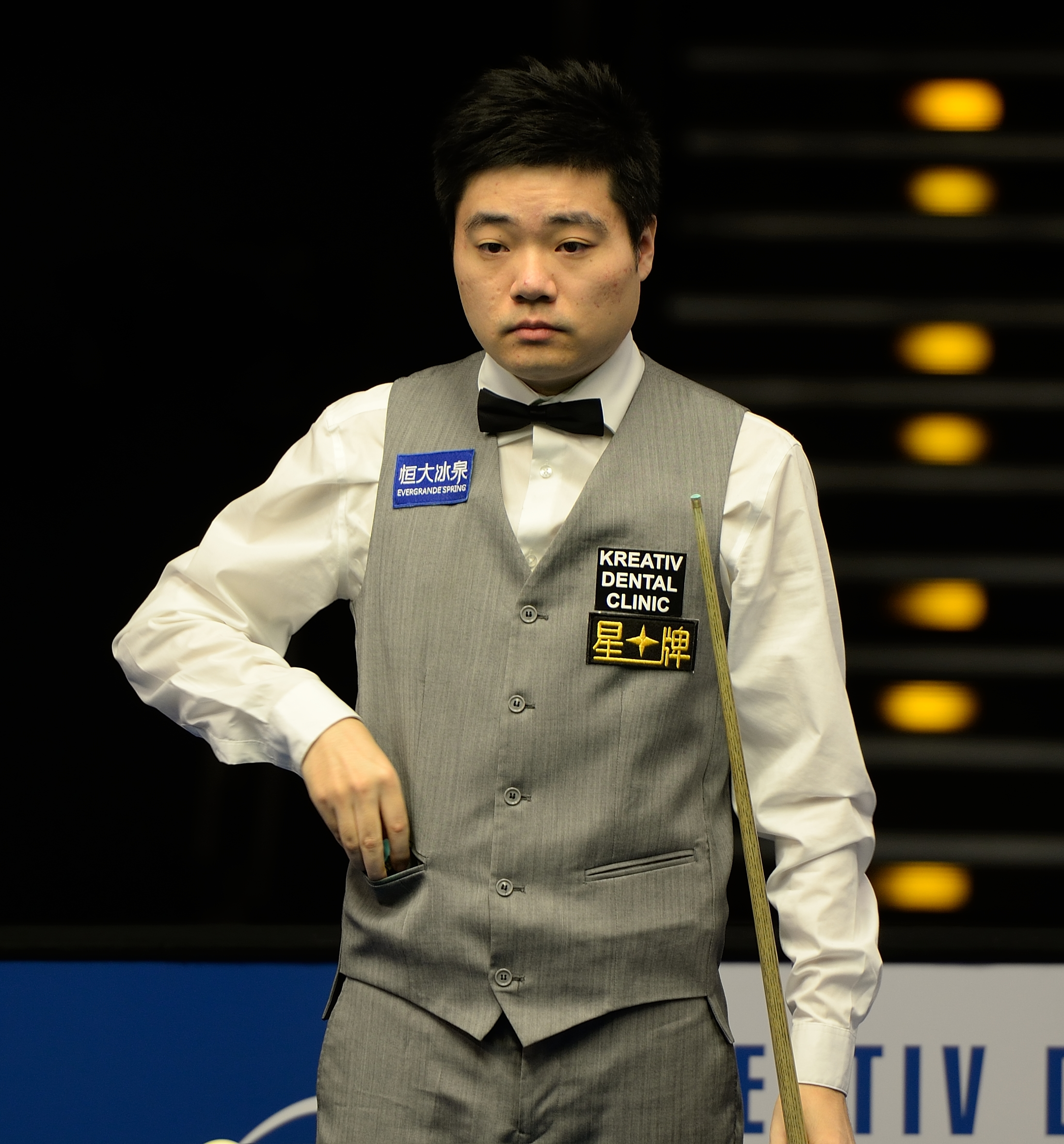
Ding Junhui, regarded as the greatest Asian snooker player of all time.

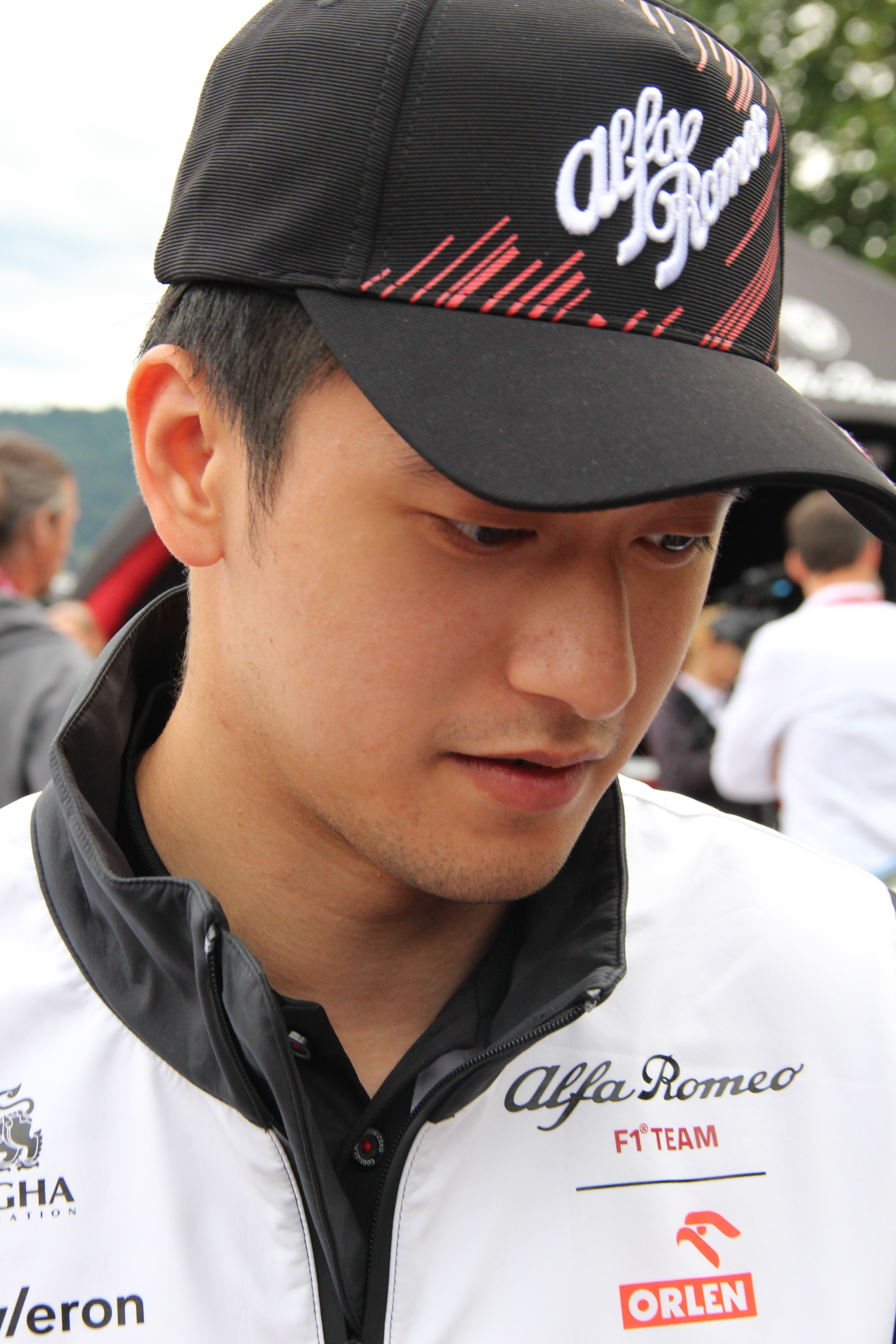
Zhou Guanyu, current Formula One driver for Sauber Motorsport.
- Fan Zhiyi (1969–), former international footballer. Former player for Crystal Palace and Cardiff City.
- Yao Ming (1980–), former professional basketball player for the Houston Rockets, and current president of the Chinese Basketball Association.
- Liu Xiang (1983–), former hurdler. Olympic Gold medallist and World Champion in the 110 metres hurdles.
- Wu Minxia (1985–), former diver, eight-time world champion and five-time Olympic and Asian champion making her one of the most decorated divers in history.
- Ding Junhui (1987–), a professional snooker player. As a former world No.1 ranked player, he is widely regarded as the greatest Asian player of all time.
- Ju Wenjun (1991–), a chess grandmaster. She is the current Women's World Chess Champion.
- Sun Yang (1991–), professional swimmer, considered to be one of the 'greatest freestylers of all time'.
- Ding Liren (1992–), a chess grandmaster. He is the current World Chess Champion.
- Chen Ruolin (1992–), former diver, multiple Olympic gold medallist.
- Xie Zhenye (1993–), professional sprinter. Olympic medallist and Asian record holder in the 200 metres.
- Wang Shun (1994–), professional swimmer, Olympic gold medallist.
- Ye Shiwen (1996–), professional swimmer, Olympic gold medallist.
- Zhang Zhizhen (1996–), highest-ever ranked Chinese male tennis player on the ATP Tour.
- Zhou Guanyu (1999–), current Formula One driver for Sauber Motorsport. He was the first Chinese driver to compete in Formula One.
- Pan Zhanle (2004–), professional swimmer, current world record holder in the 100 metre freestyle.
- Chen Yuxi (2005–), professional diver, six-time world champion.

=== Mathematicians ===
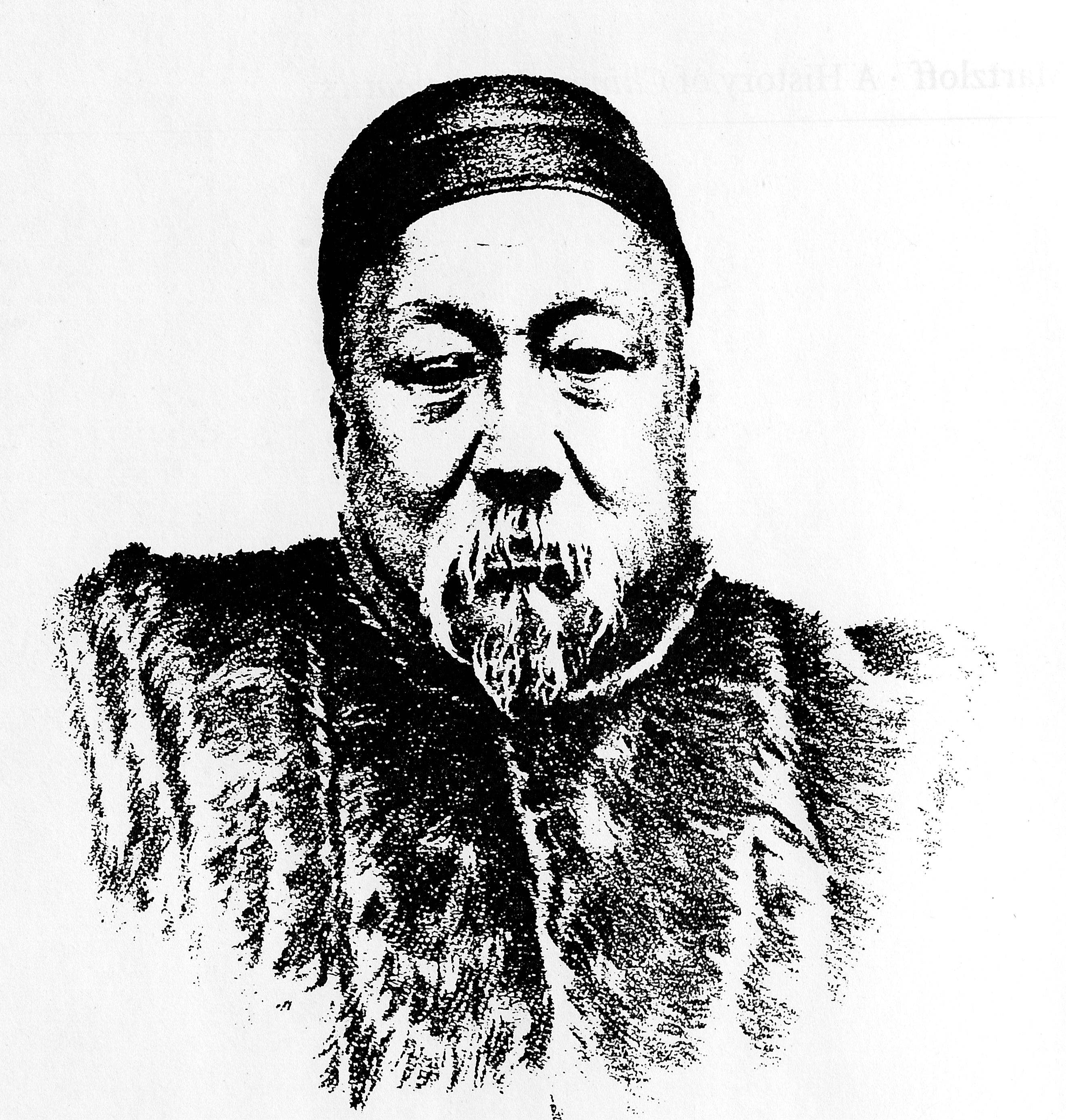
Li Shanlan, 19th century Chinese mathematician, Li invented the Li Shanlan's Summation Formulae.

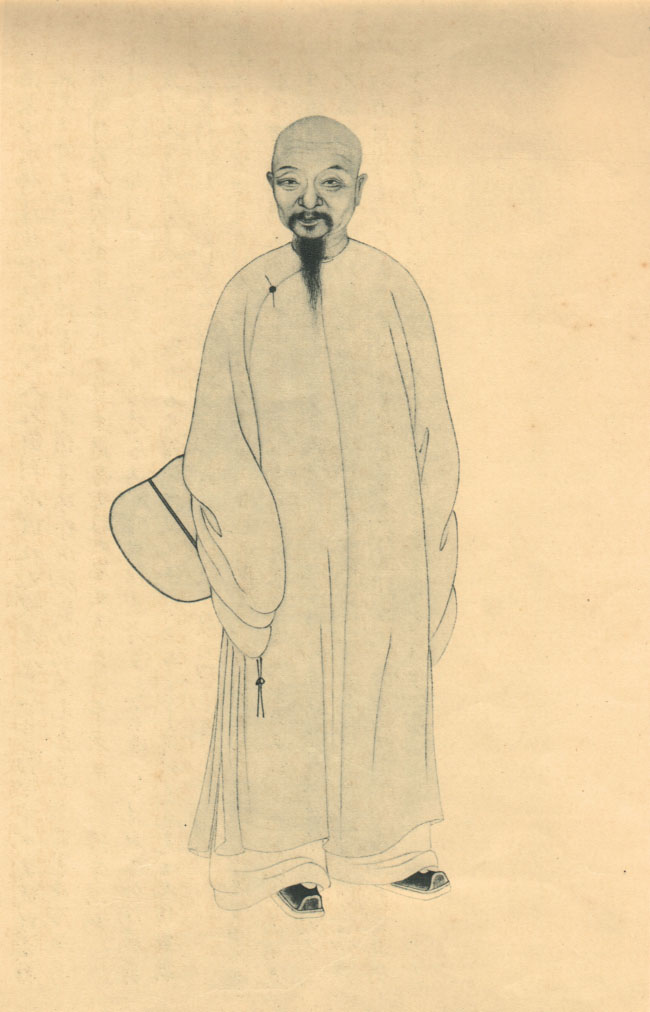
Pan Lei, QIng era scholar involved in the study of mathematics.

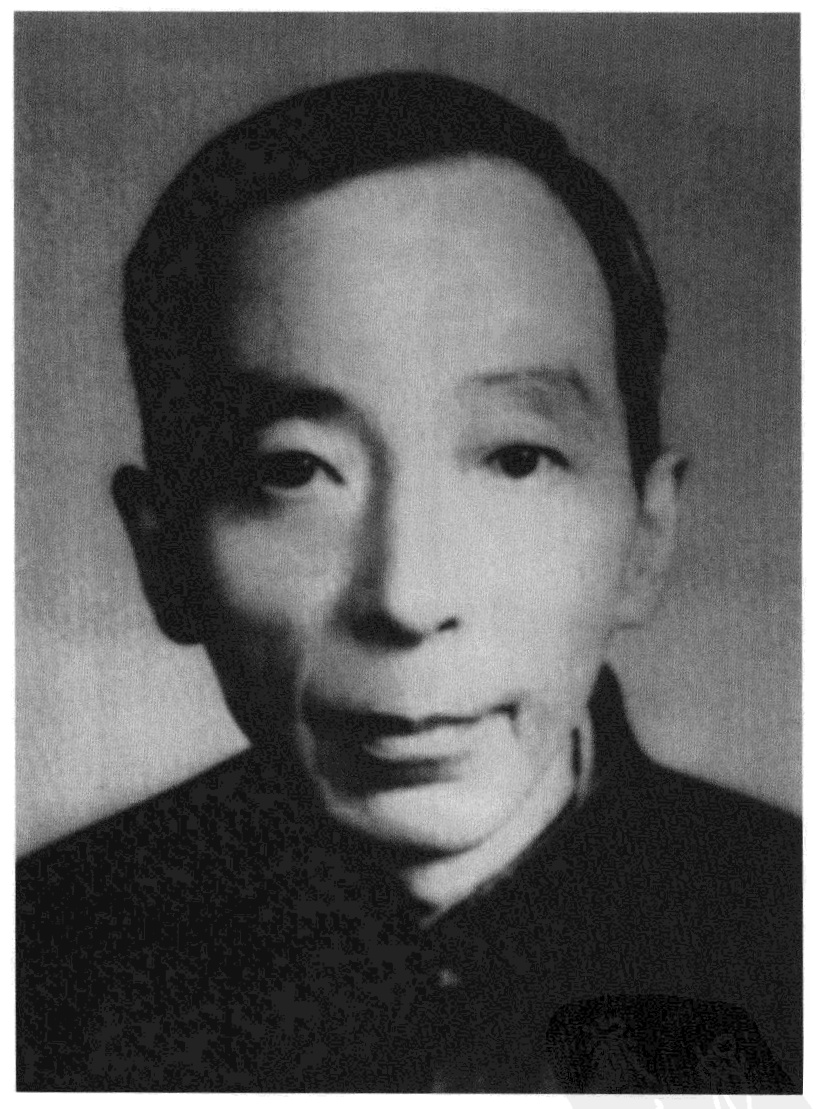
Pao-Lu Hsu, famous world class statistician and the father of probability and statistics in China.

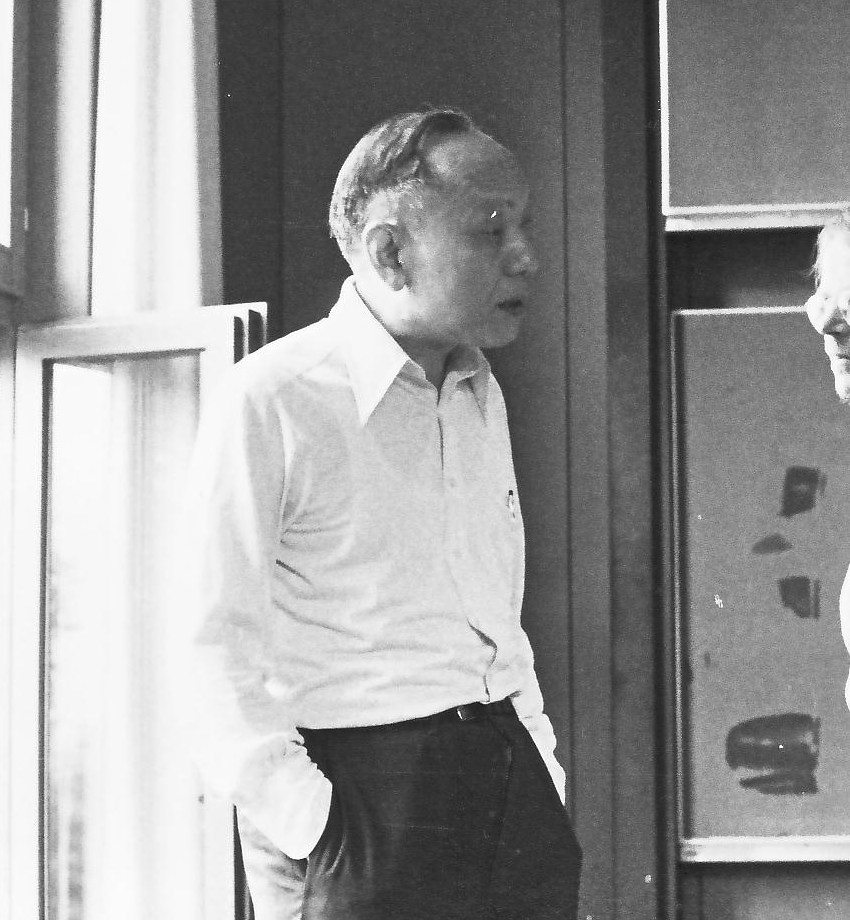
Shiing-Shen Chern, considered to be one of the greatest mathematicians of the twentieth century and a leader in geometry.
- Shen Kuo (1031–1095), a brilliant polymathic mathematician and scientist of the Song dynasty, he created an approximation of the arc of a circle s by s = c + 2v^{2}/d, where d is the diameter, v is the versine, c is the length of the chord c subtending the arc.
- Xu Guangqi (1562–1633), Chinese mathematician, agricultural scientist, astronomer and scholar-bureaucrat under the Ming dynasty.
- Pan Lei (1646 – 1708) was a Qing dynasty scholar and mathematician.
- Li Rui (1768–1817), independently invented Descartes's rule of signs during the Qing dynasty.
- Li Shanlan (1810 – 1882), invented the Li Shanlan's Summation Formulae, he also coined a great number of mathematical terms used in Chinese today.
- Hu Dunfu (1886–1978), Chinese mathematician and pioneer in higher education, he was the first dean of Tsinghua University.
- Jiang Lifu (1890–1978), father of modern Chinese mathematics and the first president of Academia Sinica of Mathematics.
- Chen Jiangong (1893–1971), an educator, mathematician and pioneer of modernizing Chinese mathematics
- Pao-Lu Hsu (1910–1970), a famed mathematician for being the father of probability and statistics in China.
- Hua Luogeng (1910–1985), famous for his important contributions to number theory and for his role as the leader of mathematics research and education in the People's Republic of China.
- Shiing-Shen Chern (1911–2004), one of the greatest mathematicians of the twentieth century and widely regarded as a leader in geometry and winning many prizes for his immense number of contributions to mathematics.
- Ky Fan (1914–2010), famous mathematician who invented many new mathematical equations and theories.
- Wu Wenjun (1919–2017), Chinese mathematician.
- Wang Yuan (mathematician) (1930–), head of the Institute of Mathematics, Chinese Academy of Sciences..
- Pan Chengdong (1934–1997), mathematician and vice president of Shandong University.
- Weinan E (1963–), applied mathematician who made many achievements in mathematics by contributing new equations into homogenization theory, theoretical models of turbulence, electronic structure analysis, multiscale methods, computational fluid dynamics, and weak KAM theory.
- Zhiwei Yun (1982–), received a gold medal with a perfect score on his first time participating, and was awarded the SASTRA Ramanujan Prize in 2012 for his "fundamental contributions to several areas that lie at the interface of representation theory, algebraic geometry and number theory".

=== Philosophers ===
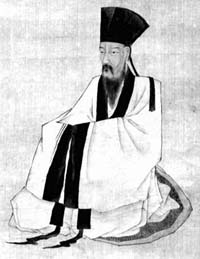
Wang Yangming, considered to be one of the greatest Confucian philosophers in history.

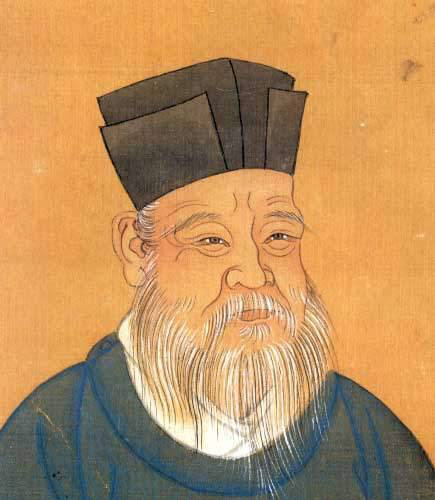
Zhu Xi, regarded as one of the most influential Confucian philosophers in history and the founder of Neo-Confucianism.

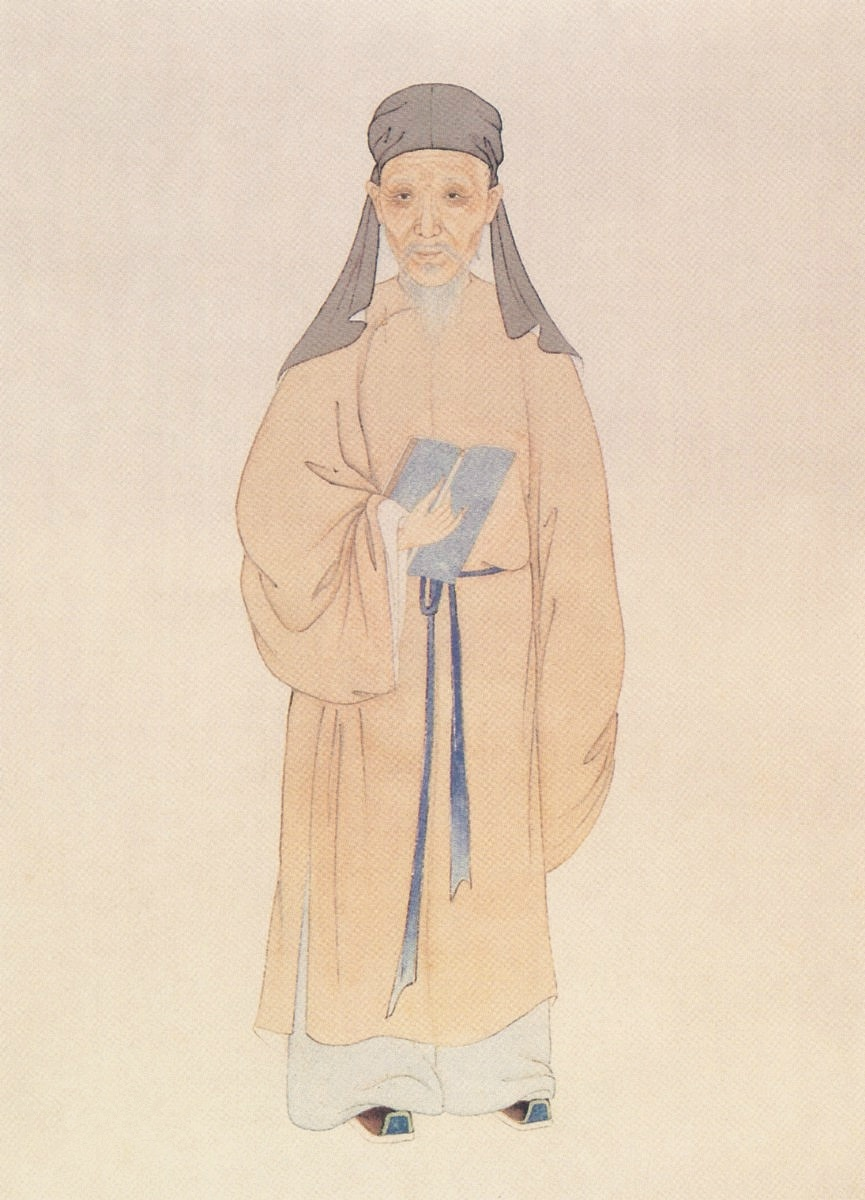
Huang Zongxi, naturalist and political theorist, he advocated the belief that ministers should be openly critical of their emperor.

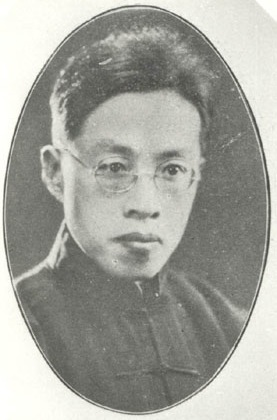
Ch'ien Mu, Chinese philosopher, historian, educator and Confucian.
- Wang Chong (Shaoxing), Han dynasty philosopher.
- Zhu Xi (Huizhou region), founder of Neo-Confucianism, Song dynasty philosopher.
- Wang Yangming (Ningbo), regarded as one of the four greatest Confucianist philosophers.
- Qian Dehong (Ningbo), philosopher, writer, and educator during the mid-late Ming dynasty.
- Pan Pingge (Ningbo), Ming era critic of Neo-Confucianism.
- Huang Zongxi (Ningbo), naturalist and political theorist, he advocated the belief that ministers should be openly critical of their emperor.
- Wang Maozu (Suzhou), Republic era philosopher and educationalist.
- Ch'ien Mu (Wuxi), Chinese philosopher, historian, educator and Confucian. He was honored as one of the "Four Greatest Historians" of Modern China.

=== Writers ===
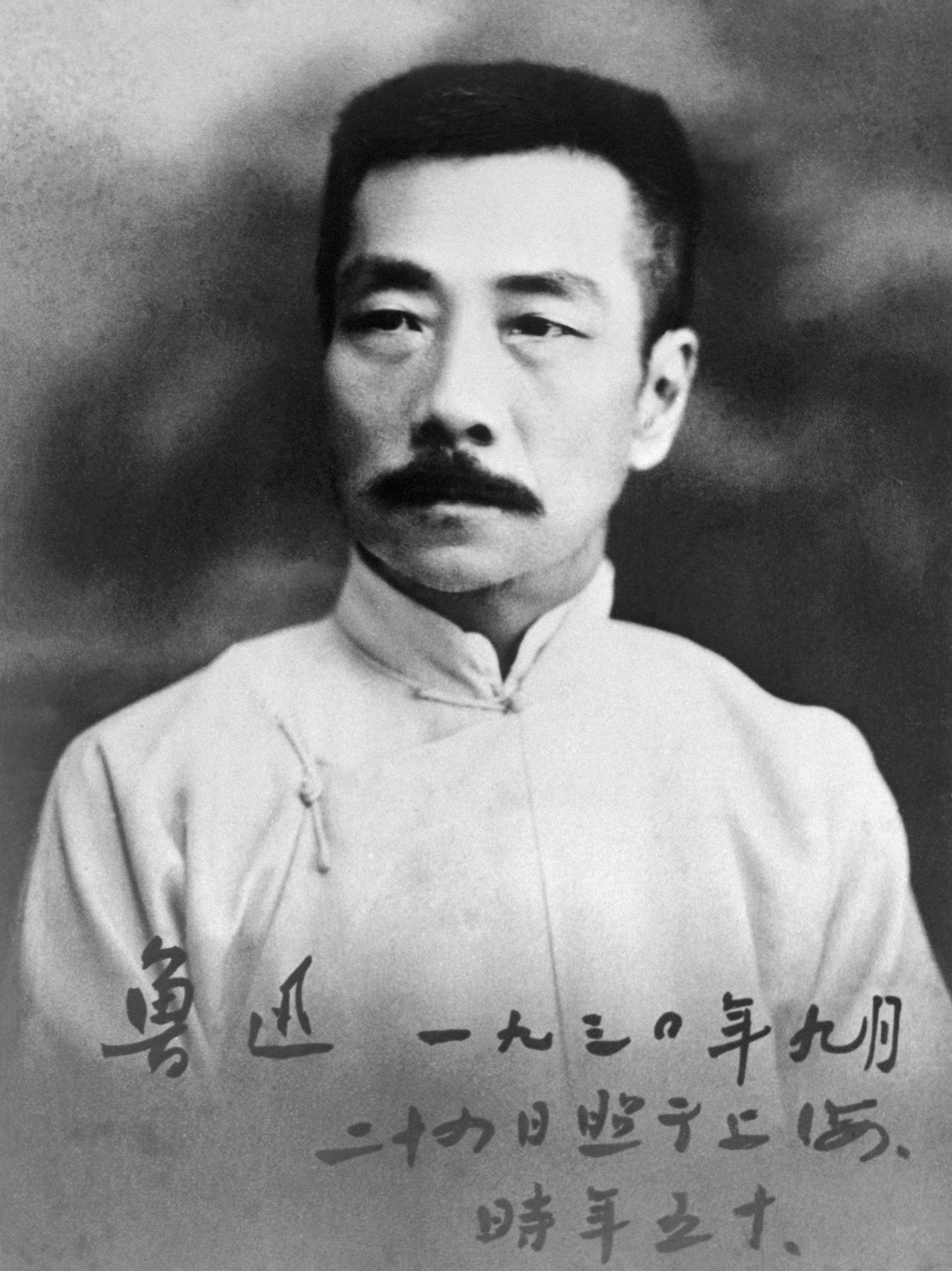
Lu Xun, praised as "The greatest writer Asia produced in the twentieth century" by Nobel prize laureate Kenzaburō Ōe.

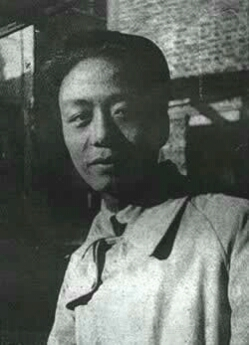
Ai Qing, one of the most outstanding poets in Modern China.

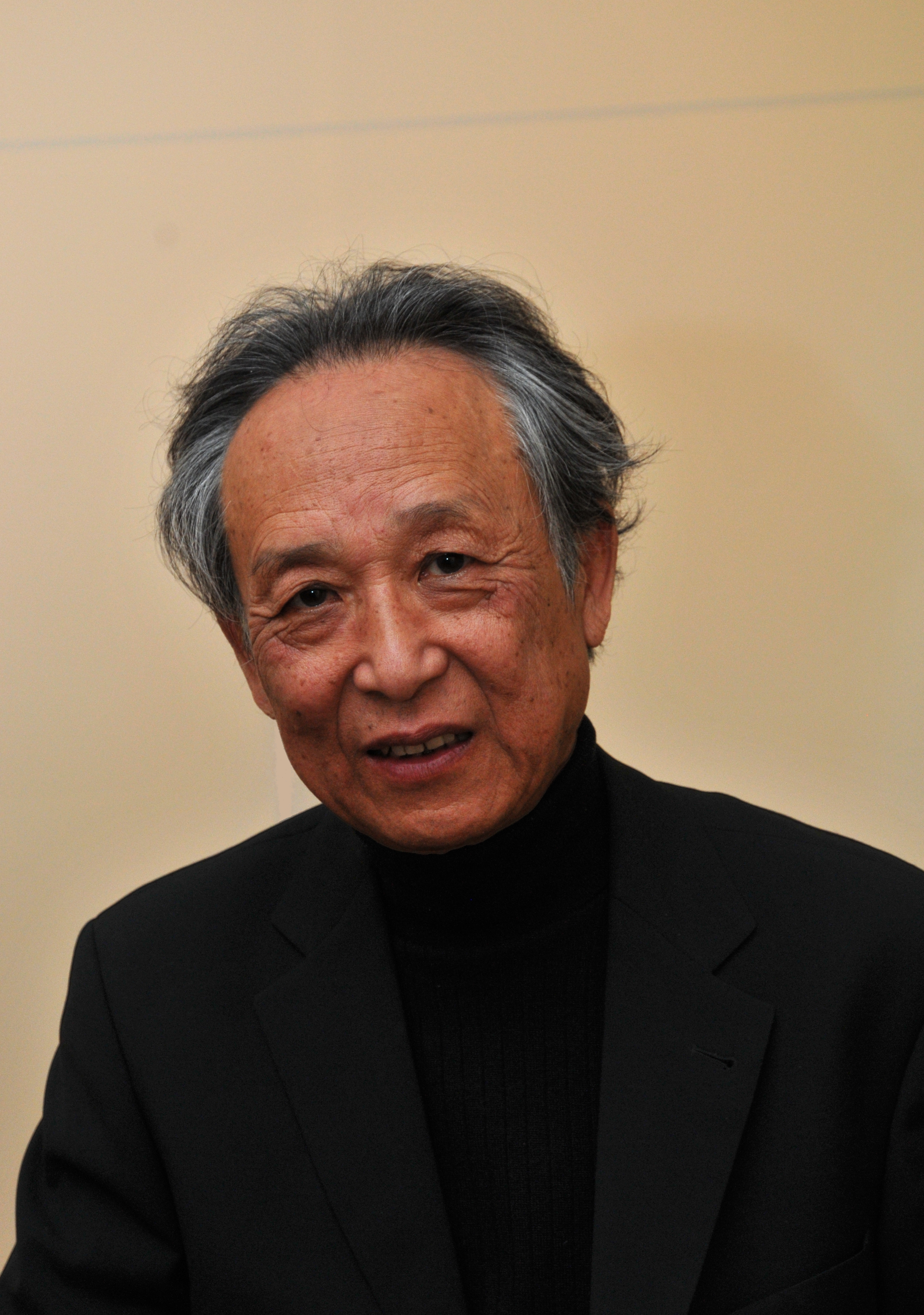
Gao Xingjian, Nobel prize laureate for Literature in 2000.

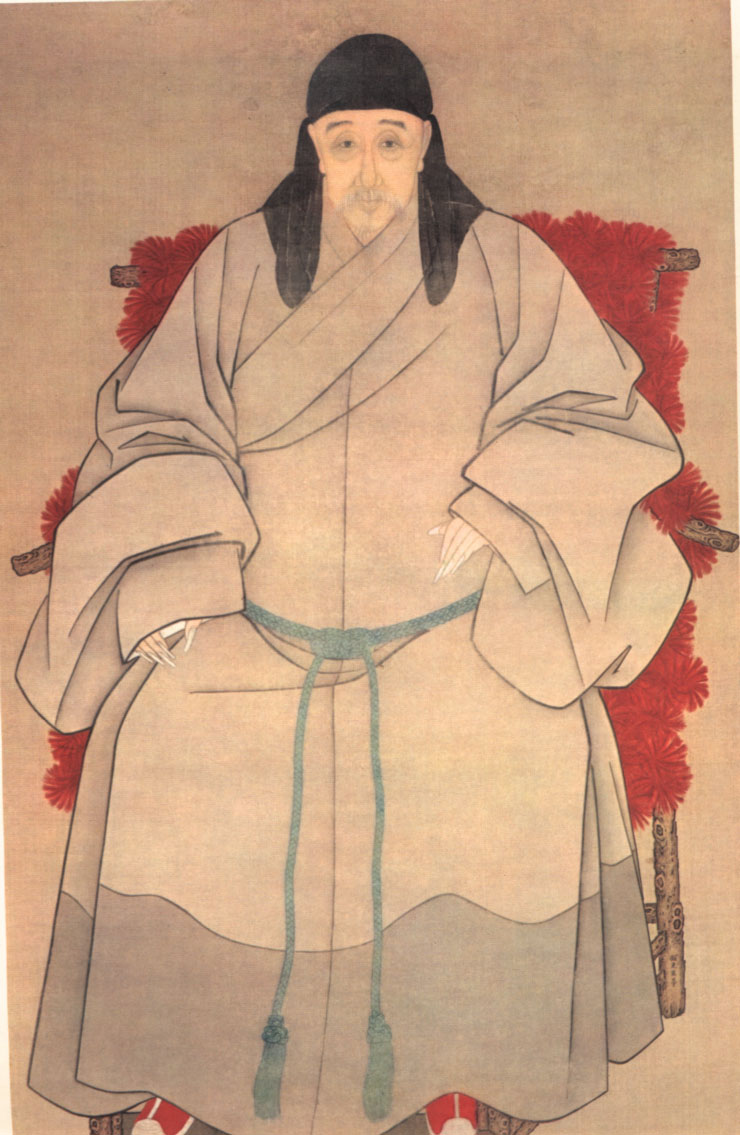
Wu Weiye, one of the Three Masters of Jiangdong.
- Zhang Rong (443–497) was a Chinese official and poet during the period of the Southern and Northern Dynasties.
- Lu Guimeng (before 836–881), Tang dynasty Chinese poet.
- Lu You (1125–1209), patriotic poet of the Southern Song dynasty.
- Shi Nai'an (1296–1372), author of the Water Margin, one of the Four Great Classical Novels.
- Qian Qianyi (1582–1664), a Chinese official, scholar and social historian of the late Ming dynasty.
- Shao Mi (1592-1642) a Chinese landscape painter, calligrapher, and poet during the Ming dynasty.
- Zhang Dai (1597–1679), Ming writer, historian and biographer.
- Wu Weiye (1609–1671) was an author and poet in Classical Chinese poetry.
- Lu Xun (1881–1936), a leading figure of modern Chinese literature.
- Liu Bannong (1891–1934), a Chinese linguist and poet.
- Gu Jiegang (1893–1980), a Chinese historian best known for his seven-volume work Gushi Bian (古史辨, or Debates on Ancient History). He was a co-founder and the leading force of the Doubting Antiquity School, and was highly influential in the 20th century development of Chinese history.
- Ai Qing (1910–1996), regarded as one of the finest modern Chinese poets.
- Fei Xiaotong (1910–2005), a pioneering Chinese researcher and professor of sociology and anthropology.
- Qian Zhongshu (1910–1998), a Chinese literary scholar and writer, known for his wit and erudition.
- Eileen Chang (1920–1995), one of the most influential modern Chinese writers, it was stated by poet and University of Southern California professor Dominic Cheung that "had it not been for the political division between the Nationalist and Communist Chinese, she (Eileen Chang) would have almost certainly won a Nobel Prize".

Gao Xingjian (1940–), novelist, playwright, critic and the Nobel prize laureate for Literature of 2000.

- Ye Wenling (1942–), Chinese novelist and politician.
- Xiaolu Guo (1973–), novelist and filmmaker, her novels have been translated into 27 languages. In 2013 she was named as one of Granta's Best of Young British Novelists, a list drawn up once a decade.

== See also ==
- Wuyue
- Chinese people
- Taihu Lakr Plain (region)
