= List of presidents of Chongqing University =

The office of the President of Chongqing University, currently held by Wang Shuxin, was created with the founding of Chongqing University in 1929 as the chief executive officer of the school.

After the founding of the Communist State, each president is appointed by and is responsible to the Central Committee of the Chinese Communist Party and the State Council, who is delegated the day-to-day running of the university. In reality, the university President reports to the Party Secretary in the university's Communist Party committee.

== Presidents of Chongqing University ==
Period	Year	President (English name)	President (Chinese name)	Alma mater	Ref
Chongqing University	October 1929–August 1935	Liu Xiang	刘湘	Sichuan Military College	
Sichuan Provincial Chongqing University	August 1935–July 1938	Hu Shuhua	胡庶华	Peking University; Technische Universität Berlin	
Sichuan Provincial Chongqing University	October 1938–July 1941	Ye Yuanlong	叶元龙	Utopia University; Wisconsin University	
National Chongqing University	September 1941–November 1949	Zhang Hongyuan	张洪沅	Tsinghua University; California Institute of Technology; Massachusetts Institute of Technology	
Chongqing University	March 1950–November 1952	He Lu	何鲁		
Chongqing University	July 1956–August 1966	Zheng Siqun	郑思群		
Chongqing University	April 1978–May 1980	Zeng Delin	曾德林		
Chongqing University	May 1980–April 1982	He Wenqin	何文钦		
Chongqing University	December 1982–December 1986	Jiang Zejia	江泽佳	Chongqing University; McGill University	
Chongqing University	December 1986–August 1992	Gu Leguan	顾乐观	Chongqing University; Saint Petersburg State Polytechnic University	
Chongqing University	August 1992–August 1996	Wu Yunpeng	吴云鹏	Huazhong University of Science and Technology	
Chongqing University	August 1996–July 1997	Liu Fei	刘飞		
Chongqing University	July 1997–January 2003	Wu Zhongfu	吴中福	Chongqing University	
Chongqing University	January 2003–December 2010	Li Xiaohong	李晓红	Chongqing University	
Chongqing University	December 2010–June 2013	Lin Jianhua	林建华	Peking University; Iowa State University	
Chongqing University	June 2013–present	Zhou Xuhong	周绪红	Hunan University	
Chongqing University	December 2017–April 2022	Zhang Zongyi	张宗益	Chongqing University; University of Portsmouth	
Chongqing University	June 2022–present	Wang Shuxin	王树新	Hebei University of Technology; Tianjin University	

== Communist Party Secretaries of Chongqing University ==
Period	Year	Communist Party Secretary (English name)	Communist Party Secretary (Chinese name)	Alma mater	Ref
Chongqing University	December 1953–August 1966	Zheng Siqun	郑思群		
Chongqing University	April 1972–May 1980	Zeng Delin	曾德林		
Chongqing University	May 1980–February 1982	He Wenqin	何文钦		
Chongqing University	February 1982–August 1983	Zhang Wencheng	张文澄		
Chongqing University	August 1983–May 1989	Cheng Diquan	程地全		
Chongqing University	August 1989–April 1997	Gu Leguan	顾乐观	Chongqing University; Saint Petersburg State Institute of Technology	
Chongqing University	April 1997–May 2000	Ou Keping	欧可平	Chongqing University	
Chongqing University	May 2000–December 2005	Zhu Jialin	祝家麟	Peking University; Pierre and Marie Curie University	
Chongqing University	December 2005–October 2015	Ou Keping	欧可平	Chongqing University	
Chongqing University	October 2015–December 2019	Zhou Xun	周旬	Chongqing Normal University; Southwest University	
Chongqing University	January 2020–present	Shu Lichun	舒立春	Chongqing University	
