= Wang Shuxin =

Chinese scientist

- 王树新

President of Chongqing University
- Incumbent
- Assumed office 1 June 2022
- Party Secretary: Shu Lichun
- Preceded by: Zhang Zongyi

Personal details
- Born: September 1966 (age 60) Xuanhua County, Hebei, China
- Party: Chinese Communist Party
- Education: Hebei University of Technology; Tianjin University
- Scientific career
- Fields: Artificial intelligence
- Workplaces: Tianjin University (1990–2022); Chongqing University (2022–present)

Chinese name
- Simplified Chinese: 王树新
- Traditional Chinese: 王樹新
Transcriptions
Standard Mandarin
- Hanyu Pinyin: Wáng Shùxīn

Wang Shuxin (Chinese: 王树新; born September 1966) is a Chinese scientist who is a professor at Tianjin University, a former vice president of Tianjin University, and currently president of Chongqing University.

== Biography ==
Wang was born in Xuanhua County (now Xuanhua District), Hebei, in September 1966. He holds a Bachelor of Engineering degree from Hebei University of Technology, and Master of Engineering and Doctor of Engineering degrees from the Tianjin University, all in mechanical manufacturing and automation.

Starting in February 1990, Wang successively served as assistant (February 1990), lecturer (August 1992), associate professor (November 1994), full professor (November 1998), and doctoral supervisor (June 1999) of Tianjin University. He moved up the ranks to become dean of Graduate School in May 2017 and vice president in September 2018. He was a visiting scholar at the Robot Laboratory in Paris (2001), King's College London (2008), and the University of Michigan (2010).

In June 2022, he was appointed president of Chongqing University, a position at vice-ministerial level.

== Honors and awards ==
- 2013 State Science and Technology Progress Award (Second Class)
- 2016 State Technological Invention Award (Second Class)
- 2020 State Technological Invention Award (Second Class)
- 2021 Member of the Chinese Academy of Engineering (CAE)

Educational offices
Preceded by Zhang Zongyi	President of Chongqing University; 2022–present	Incumbent
