= Zhang Hongyuan =

Chinese chemist

- 张洪沅

President of Chongqing University
- In office September 1941 – November 1949
- Preceded by: Ye Yuanlong
- Succeeded by: He Lu

Personal details
- Born: April 8, 1902 Huayang County, Sichuan, Qing China
- Died: October 28, 1992 (aged 90) Chengdu, Sichuan, People's Republic of China
- Party: Jiusan Society
- Parent: Zhang Yunkui (father)
- Education: Tsinghua University; California Institute of Technology; Massachusetts Institute of Technology
- Occupation: Chemist, educator

Zhang Hongyuan (simplified Chinese: 张洪沅; traditional Chinese: 張洪沅; pinyin: Zhāng Hóngyuán; 8 April 1902 – 28 October 1992) was a Chinese chemist and educator. He was President of Chongqing University between September 1941 to November 1949.

Zhang was an adviser at the Central Committee of the Jiusan Society.

== Biography ==
Zhang was born in Huayang County, Sichuan, in 1902, during the Qing Empire, to Zhang Yunkui (Chinese: 张运魁), a traditional intellectual. His parents died when he was a child. He was raised by his aunt. After graduating from Tsinghua University in August 1924, he went to study at California Institute of Technology, in the United States. Zhang received his master's degree from Massachusetts Institute of Technology in January 1928. After college, he worked as a chemical engineer at a paper mill in Ohio, and later he joined the chemical engineering faculty of MIT and earned his doctor's degree in 1930.

Zhang returned to China in 1931 and one year later became a professor at the Chemical Engineering Department of Nankai University.

In 1937, when the Second Sino-Japanese War broke out, he moved to Sichuan and taught at Sichuan University. He served as director of Sichuan University's Department of Chemistry and the university's Dean of School of Science, he founded the Research Laboratory of Applied Chemistry there.

In September 1941, he was recruited by the Kuomintang government to succeed Ye Yuanlong as President of Chongqing University, a position in which he remained until November 1949.

After the founding of the Communist State, he was a professor at Sichuan University of Science and Engineering (1952) and Chengdu Institute of Technology (1956), respectively.

Zhang died of illness in 1992, in Chengdu, Sichuan.

Educational offices
Preceded by Ye Yuanlong	President of Chongqing University; 1941–1949	Succeeded by He Lu (何鲁)
