= Jiang Zejia =

Chinese electrical engineer and educator

- 江泽佳

President of Chongqing University
- In office December 1982 – December 1986
- Preceded by: He Wenqin
- Succeeded by: Gu Leguan

Personal details
- Born: November 1920 Hankou, Hubei, China
- Died: November 10, 2013 (aged 92–93) Chongqing, China
- Party: Chinese Communist Party
- Education: Chongqing University; McGill University
- Occupation: Electrical engineer, educator

Jiang Zejia (simplified Chinese: 江泽佳; traditional Chinese: 江澤佳; pinyin: Jiāng Zéjiā; November 1920 – 10 November 2013) was a Chinese electrical engineer and educator.

== Biography ==
Jiang was born in November 1920 in Hankou, Hubei, with his ancestral home in Jingde County, Anhui. After the high school, he studied, then taught, at what is now Chongqing University. He went to study at McGill University in Canada in 1947.

He returned to China in 1948 and that year joined the Department of Electrical Engineering faculty of Chongqing University, he was promoted to professor in 1951. In 1951 Chongqing University appointed him director of its Electrical Engineering Department. In 1982, he became President of Chongqing University, serving until 1986. On November 10, 2013, he died of illness in the First Affiliated Hospital of Chongqing Medical University.

Educational offices
Preceded by He Wenqin (何文钦)	President of Chongqing University; 1982–1986	Succeeded by Gu Leguan
