= Gu Leguan =

Chinese physicist and educator

- 顾乐观

Communist Party Secretary of Chongqing University
- In office August 1989 – April 1997
- Preceded by: Cheng Diquan
- Succeeded by: Ou Keping

President of Chongqing University
- In office December 1986 – August 1992
- Preceded by: Jiang Zejia
- Succeeded by: Wu Yunpeng

Personal details
- Born: January 1935 Wu County, Jiangsu, China
- Died: 2001 (aged 65–66) Chongqing, China
- Party: Chinese Communist Party
- Education: Chongqing University; Saint Petersburg State Polytechnic University

Gu Leguan (simplified Chinese: 顾乐观; traditional Chinese: 顧樂觀; pinyin: Gù Lèguān; January 1935 – 2001) was a Chinese physicist and educator. He served as President of Chongqing University from December 1986 to August 1992, and Communist Party Secretary of Chongqing University, from August 1989 to April 1997.

== Biography ==
Gu was born and raised in Wu County, Jiangsu. After high school, he studied, then taught, at Chongqing University. He earned his Ph.D. in Sciences and Engineering from Saint Petersburg State Polytechnic University in 1960s. After graduation, he returned to China and taught at Chongqing University. In December 1986 the Central Committee of the Chinese Communist Party and the State Council of the People's Republic of China appointed him President of Chongqing University, a position he held until August 1992. He also served as Communist Party Secretary of Chongqing University, from August 1989 to April 1997. He died in 2001 in Chongqing.

Educational offices
Preceded by Jiang Zejia	President of Chongqing University; 1986–1992	Succeeded by Wu Yunpeng (吴云鹏)
Party political offices
Preceded by Cheng Diquan (程地全)	Communist Party Secretary of Chongqing University; 1989–1997	Succeeded by Ou Keping (欧可平)
