= Li Shanlan identity =

Combinatorial identity

In mathematics, in combinatorics, the Li Shanlan identity (also called Li Shanlan's summation formula) is a certain combinatorial identity attributed to the nineteenth century Chinese mathematician Li Shanlan. Since Li Shanlan is also known as Li Renshu (his courtesy name), this identity is also referred to as the Li Renshu identity. This identity appears in the third chapter of Duoji bilei (垛积比类 / 垛積比類, meaning summing finite series), a mathematical text authored by Li Shanlan and published in 1867 as part of his collected works. A Czech mathematician Josef Kaucky published an elementary proof of the identity along with a history of the identity in 1964. Kaucky attributed the identity to a certain Li Jen-Shu. From the account of the history of the identity, it has been ascertained that Li Jen-Shu is in fact Li Shanlan. Western scholars had been studying Chinese mathematics for its historical value; but the attribution of this identity to a nineteenth-century Chinese mathematician sparked a rethink on the mathematical value of the writings of Chinese mathematicians.

== The identity ==
The Li Shanlan identity states that

$$\sum_{k=0}^p {p \choose k}^2 {{n+2p-k}\choose {2p}} = {{n+p} \choose p}^2$$.

Li Shanlan did not present the identity in this way. He presented it in the traditional Chinese algorithmic and rhetorical way.

== Proofs of the identity ==
Li Shanlan had not given a proof of the identity in Duoji bilei. The first proof using differential equations and Legendre polynomials, concepts foreign to Li, was published by Pál Turán in 1936, and the proof appeared in Chinese in Yung Chang's paper published in 1939. Since then at least fifteen different proofs have been found. The following is one of the simplest proofs.

The proof begins by expressing $n \choose q$ as Vandermonde's convolution:

$${n \choose q } = \sum_{k=0}^q {{n-p} \choose k}{p \choose {q-k}}$$

Pre-multiplying both sides by $n\choose p$,

$${n \choose p}{n \choose q} = \sum_{k=0}^q {n \choose p} {{n-p} \choose k}{p \choose {q-k}}$$.

Using the following relation

$${n \choose p} {{n-p} \choose k} = {{p+k} \choose k}{n \choose {p+k}}$$

the above relation can be transformed to

$${n \choose p}{n \choose q} = \sum_{k=0}^q {p \choose {q-k}} {{p+k} \choose k}{n \choose {p+k}}$$.

Next the relation

$${p \choose {q-k}} {{p+k} \choose {k}} = {q \choose k}{{p+k}\choose {q}}$$

is used to get

$${n \choose p}{n \choose q} = \sum_{k=0}^q {q \choose k}{n \choose {p+k}}{ {p+k}\choose q}$$.

Another application of Vandermonde's convolution yields

$${ {p+k}\choose q} =  \sum_{j=0}^q {p \choose j}{k \choose {q-j}}$$

and hence

$${n \choose p}{n \choose q} = \sum_{k=0}^q {q \choose k}{n \choose {p+k}} \sum_{j=0}^q {p \choose j}{k \choose {q-j}}$$

Since $p \choose j$ is independent of k, this can be put in the form

$${n \choose p}{n \choose q} = \sum_{j=0}^q {p \choose j}\sum_{k=0}^q {q \choose k}{n \choose {p+k}}{k \choose {q-j}}$$

Next, the result

$${q \choose k}{k \choose {q-j}} = {q\choose j}{j \choose{q-k}}$$

gives

${n \choose p}{n \choose q} = \sum_{j=0}^q {p \choose j}\sum_{k=0}^q {q \choose j}{j \choose {q-k}}{n \choose {p+k}}$

$$= \sum_{j=0}^q {p \choose j}{q \choose j}\sum_{k=0}^q {j \choose {q-k}}{n \choose {p+k}}$$
$$= \sum_{j=0}^q {p \choose j}{q \choose j}{{n+j}\choose {p+q}}$$

Setting p = q and replacing j by k,

$${n \choose p}^2 = \sum_{k=0}^p {p \choose k}^2{{n+k}\choose {2p}}$$

Li's identity follows from this by replacing n by n + p and doing some rearrangement of terms in the resulting expression:

$${{n+p} \choose p}^2 = \sum_{k=0}^p {p \choose k}^2{{n+2p-k}\choose {2p}}$$

== On Duoji bilei ==
The term duoji denotes a certain traditional Chinese method of computing sums of piles. Most of the mathematics that was developed in China since the sixteenth century is related to the duoji method. Li Shanlan was one of the greatest exponents of this method and Duoji bilei is an exposition of his work related to this method. Duoji bilei consists of four chapters: Chapter 1 deals with triangular piles, Chapter 2 with finite power series, Chapter 3 with triangular self-multiplying piles and Chapter 4 with modified triangular piles.
