= Ni Guangjiong =

Chinese physicist and science writer (born 1934)

Ni Guangjiong (Chinese: 倪光炯; born December 29, 1934, in Ningbo, Zhejiang) is a Chinese physicist. He began studies in physics about 1950, and became a Doctor of Philosophy in 1955. He married Su Qing, a physics professor, in 1960. He published his first book in 1978. He holds a Chair in Physics at Fudan University, Shanghai. He is the director of Modern Physics Institute and the head of the Division for Theoretical Physics.

He is a specialist in quantum mechanics, field theory, and particle physics. His books include Modern Physics (1979), Methods of Mathematical Physics (1989), Levinson Theorem, Anomaly and Phase Transition of Vacuum (1995), Physics Changing the World (1998), and Advanced Quantum Mechanics (2000).

== Accelerating universe: the role of the antimatter ==
Ni is studied by several authors in astrophysics and for the theories of the antimatter, that he includes in the cosmological model that he proposes.

The theories of Ni about antimatter are also used for invariances of scale within the framework as Quantum tunnelling and it is within the framework of this cosmological model that Ni develops an important part of his study with regard to the neutrinos.

== International works about a superluminal speed of the (muon) neutrino ==
Ni claimed to prove that the muon neutrino exceeded the speed of light in vacuum. He spent most of his career studying this. This work was cited on many occasions by international teams of scientists and in several anthologies.

== Distinctions ==
Ni received scientific awards recognized nationally in China, inter alia :

- Award of the worker models national (for his research) in 1979
- Progress Award in 1988 for state education delivered by the Commission of the Chinese Academy of Sciences and Technology
- Progress Award delivered by the Ministry for the teaching of sciences and technology for a work on the theorem of Levinson left in 1995
- National outstanding commendation award of teaching in 2002 for a work entitled "world Change in physics"
- National award for the colleges of teaching and universities for a book about quantum Mechanical "advanced" in 2002.

Guang-Jiong Ni has also been quoted in the field of philosophy and by Siemens.

== Bibliography ==
- Modern Physics (1979)
- Methods of Mathematical Physics (1989)
- Levinson Theorem, Anomaly and Phase Transition of Vacuum (1995)
- Physics Changing the World (1998)

=== Anthologies containing his writings ===
- Relativity, Gravitation, Cosmology, Contemporary Fundamental Physics, under the direction of Valeri Dvoeglazov
- Surface Physics and Related Topics: Festschrift for Xide Xie, with Fujia Yang, Xun Wang and Kai-Ming Zhang
- Advanced Quantum Mechanics, with Su-qing Chen

== See also ==
- Neutrino
- Neutrino oscillation
- Solar neutrino problem
- Cosmic neutrino background
- Faster than light
- Special relativity
- Speed of light
- OPERA experiment
- MINOS
- Wheeler–Feynman absorber theory
