= List of Agnes Scott College alumnae =

Agnes Scott College is a women's college in Decatur, Georgia. It was known as the Decatur Female Seminary from 1889 to 1890 and the Agnes Scott Institute from 1890 to 1906.

== Academia ==
- Andrea Abrams, anthropologist and associate professor at Centre College
- Martha Bailey, 1997, professor of economics and scholar of how access to contraception has shaped women's lives
- Anita Barbee,1982, psychologist and professor & Distinguished University Scholar at the University of Louisville's Kent School of Social Work
- Tommie Dora Barker, 1909, public librarian and founding dean of Emory Library School
- Marilyn Breen, 1966, professor of mathematics at the University of Oklahoma
- Mary Brown Bullock, 1966, seventh president of Agnes Scott College and executive vice chancellor of Duke Kunshan University
- Chesya Burke, 2013, author of comic books and speculative fiction; assistant professor of English and U.S. Literatures; director of Africana Studies at Stetson University
- Sue Jinks-Robertson, 1977, professor of genetics and microbiology
- Susan M. Phillips, 1967, economist, member of the Federal Reserve Board of Governors, and dean of the George Washington University School of Business
- Loretta Ross, 2007, academic, feminist, and activist who advocates for reproductive justice
- Cornelia Strong, 1901, professor, mathematician, and astronomer
- Anna Irwin Young, 1910, professor of mathematics, physics, and astronomy

== Art and architecture ==
- Jordan Casteel, 2011, figure painter
- Ipek Duben, 1963, contemporary visual artist
- Margot Gayle, 1931, historic preservationist and author who helped save the Victorian cast-iron architecture in New York City's SoHo district
- Anna Colquitt Hunter, Historic Savannah Foundation founder
- Mary E. Hutchinson, non-degreed, artist
- Leila Ross Wilburn, 1904, architect

== Business ==
- Kay Krill, 1977, president and chief executive officer of ANN INC., parent company of Ann Taylor and LOFT

== Entertainment ==
- Amaarae, 2017, singer and songwriter
- Amira Unplugged, 2019, singer and rapper
- Michelle Malone, 1990, singer-songwriter and guitarist
- Joanna Moore, non-degreed, actress and mother of Tatum O'Neal
- Jennifer Nettles, 1997, lead singer of the AMA and Grammy Award-winning country music band Sugarland
- Saycon Sengbloh, 2000, actress and singer

== Law ==
- Jean H. Toal, 1965, chief justice of the South Carolina Supreme Court

== Literature ==
- Kimberly Belle, novelist
- Chesya Burke, 2013, author of comic books and speculative fiction; assistant professor of English and U.S. Literatures; director of Africana Studies at Stetson University
- Mary Norton Kratt, 1958, writer of Charlotte history and Southern novels
- Catherine Marshall, 1936, author of the novel Christy
- Marsha Norman, 1969, playwright
- Agnes White Sanford, 1919, author of The Healing Light

== Politics ==
- Teri Anulewicz, 1998, Georgia state representative
- Catherine Fleming Bruce, 1984, author, activist, and 2026 candidate for United States Senate
- Constance Curry, 1955, civil rights activist
- Goudyloch E. Dyer, 1938, Illinois state representative
- Caroline Frederick, 1928, South Carolina House of Representatives
- Katherine Harris, 1979, U.S. House of Representatives, Secretary of State of Florida, and Florida Senate
- Bertha "B" Holt, 1938, former North Carolina state representative and children's rights advocate
- Brownie Ledbetter, political activist, social justice crusader, and lobbyist who was involved in the civil rights, feminist, labor, and environmental movements in Arkansas
- Rosalind McGee, non-degreed, Utah House of Representatives
- Frances Freeborn Pauley, 1927, civil rights activist
- Martha Priscilla Shaw, non-degreed, mayor of Sumter, South Carolina (1952–1956), first female mayor in South Carolina
- Marjorie Turnbull, non-degreed, Florida House of Representatives

== Religion ==
- Sarah Fisher, 1993, Episcopal bishop
- Ivylyn Girardeau, 1922, medical missionary in India and Pakistan
- Rachel Henderlite, 1928, first woman to be ordained a pastor of the Presbyterian Church in the United States

== Science and medicine ==
- Frances Anderson, pioneer of art therapy
- Ivylyn Girardeau, 1922, medical missionary in India and Pakistan
- Kathryn Johnson, 1947, journalist
- Lucia Murchison, 1922, social worker, club woman, and president of the South Carolina Public Health Association
- Willie W. Smith, 1927, physiologist who specialized in radiobiology and researcher with the National Institutes of Health
- Patricia Ann Webb, 1945, microbiologist with the Centers for Disease Control and Prevention and National Institutes of Health

== Sports ==
- Wasfia Nazreen, 2006, mountaineer
