= The Bolles School =

Private school in Jacksonville, Florida, United States

Location
- 7400 San Jose Boulevard; Jacksonville and Ponte Vedra Beach, Florida; United States; 30°14′31″N 81°37′46″W

Information
- Other name: Florida Military Academy
- Type: Private, day, boarding
- Motto: "All things possible"
- Religious affiliation: Non-denominational
- Established: 1933
- Headmaster: Tyler Hodges
- Faculty: 295
- Grades: Pre-K–12
- Gender: coeducational
- Enrollment: 1,742
- Average class size: 15
- Student to teacher ratio: 1:12
- Campus: Suburban
- Campus size: 84 acres (0.34 km^{2})
- Colors: Blue and Orange
- Nickname: Bulldogs
- Newspaper: The Bugle
- Yearbook: The Turris
- Endowment: $19 million
- Tuition: 2023-24 Tuition Lower School: $12,780-$21,680; Middle School: $29,890; Upper School: $30,810 Boarding: $62,920
- Website: bolles.org
- San Jose Thematic Group
- U.S. National Register of Historic Places
- Bolles Hall
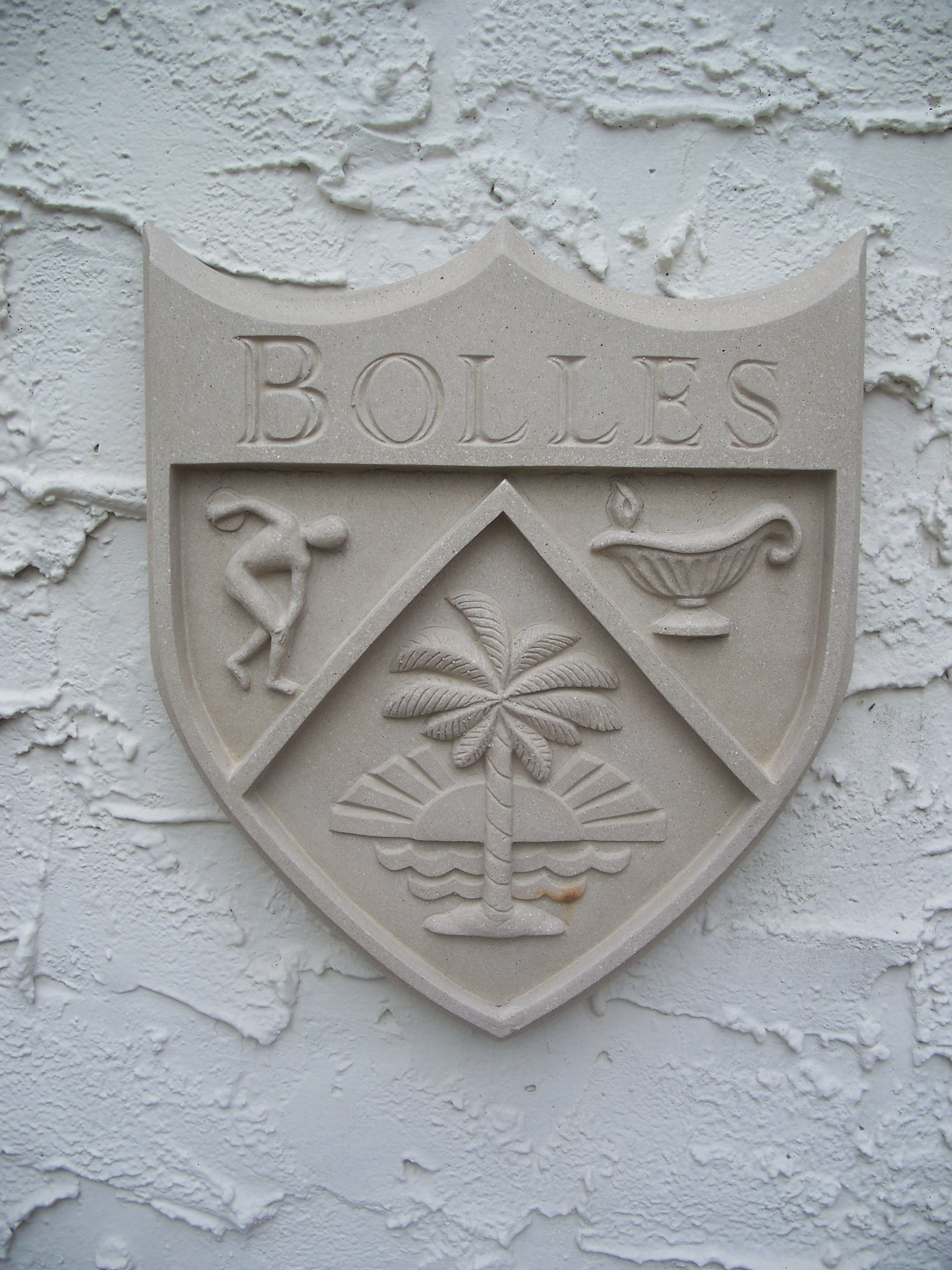
- MPS: San Jose Thematic Group
- NRHP reference No.: 64000119

The Bolles School is an American private and independent college preparatory day and boarding school in Jacksonville, Florida governed by a self-perpetuating Board of Trustees. It has a lower school (including pre-kindergarten), a middle school, and a high school, spread across four campuses around the Jacksonville area, and enrolls about 1,800 students a year. The school was founded in 1933 as an all-boys military academy. It dropped its military focus in 1962 and its athletics programs have been recognized as some of the best in the Florida High School Athletic Association by Sports Illustrated magazine.

== History ==
The school was founded as an all-boys' military academy for grades 7-12 in 1933 by Agnes Cain Painter, an associate of Richard J. Bolles. The original campus, now known as the San Jose Campus, was formed from the San Jose Hotel, a former hotel on San Jose Boulevard near the east bank of the St. Johns River. Bolles announced that it would drop its military status in 1961 and the graduating class of 1962 ended the military era. It began admitting girls in 1971. Today, male and female students are enrolled in relatively equal numbers. The lower school opened with a kindergarten class in 1981, expanding one grade each year, finishing in 1986 with 5th grade or 1987 with 6th grade. Pre-K was added after 2005. The Bartram School became the Bolles Middle School grades 6-8 in 1991.

International students have enrolled at Bolles since the late 1930s, and the school maintains separate boys and girls boarding facilities for 90 students from other states and 22 foreign countries. The school also has an active student exchange program with schools in China, Japan, France and Spain. Participants live with the host family while attending school.

=== Bartram School ===
The Glynlea School was founded by four Jacksonville families in 1934 at the home of Madeleine Downing Knight on the Arlington River. Four years later it was renamed the Bartram School when it moved to a location on Little Pottsburg Creek. Bartram School merged into the Bolles School in 1991 and the Bartram campus became home to the Bolles Middle School. The Bolles girl's boarding program was at that location until 2021 when the Bartram Residence Hall for Girls was dedicated on the San campus.

=== Headmasters ===
Harry M. deMontmollin Jr. was the fifth headmaster from 1976 to 2000, the longest tenure of any president. John E. Trainer, Jr. served as the sixth Bolles President/Headmaster from 2002 to 2012, overseeing the growth of the Bartram campus, creation of an elementary school in Ponte Vedra Beach, and boosting the school's endowment. He was succeeded by Brian E. M. Johnson for the 2012–2013 school year, who was succeeded by Bradley R. Johnson '79, who was succeeded by David J. Farace who was then succeeded by the previous Assistant Head of School Tyler Hodges the ninth head of school since its founding.

=== Campuses ===
- Upper School (grades 9–12) – San Jose Campus (Jacksonville)
- Middle School (6–8) – Bartram Campus (Jacksonville)
- Lower School (pre-kindergarten–5) – Ponte Vedra (Ponte Vedra Beach) & Whitehurst (Jacksonville) Campuses

== Academics ==
Bolles has been a fully accredited Florida high school since 1934. Bolles operates on a two-semester academic year, with each semester split into two quarters. Bolles offers 38 Honors courses and approximately 30 Advanced Placement courses each year, depending on enrollment and student interest. In May 2024 AP exams, the average score was 4.0 and 91% of students earned at least a 3.0. There are 295 faculty/staff positions; 42% have master’s degrees and 4% have doctoral degrees. The student-teacher ratio was approximately 12:1 and the average class size was 15 in 2023-2024.

The Sanchez & Fender Center for Innovation contains the Bolles STEM programs. The courses they offer are advanced study in robotics, engineering & design, computer programming & IT. In addition to classrooms, there are 12 specialty labs and areas for biology, chemistry and anatomy.

The school considers Fine Arts to be integral to human experience and history. Every student is required to be adept in at least one art discipline to acquire a broad historical and cultural perspective. Study of performing and/or visual arts enable students "to communicate clearly, analyze abstract images, make discriminating judgments, and understand their world."

The school considers World Language skills essential for future success in college, travel and the profession they choose. The program provides the student with the skills to listen, read, speak and write the language while becoming aware of cultural aspects of the language. Six advanced languages are offered including Mandarin, French, Japanese, Latin, Spanish and Arabic. The school has ten domestic and international programs for travel.

Graduation requires a minimum of 22 core credits with a C− average, including 4 English, 4 Mathematics, 3 Science, 3 Social Studies, 2 Language, 1 PE/Fitness, 1 Fine Arts, 3.5 Electives and .5 Wellness.

== Athletics ==
In 2005, Sports Illustrated named Bolles's athletic program the ninth best in the country, and second best in Florida. Of the top twenty-five schools, Bolles was the only one with an Upper School enrollment of under 1,000 students. As of the 2024-2025 school year, Bolles has received the Florida High School Athletic Association's Dodge Sunshine Cup/Floyd E. Lay All-Sports Award (given to the best overall athletic program in each school type/size classification in Florida) 29 times. Following the 2023–2024 school year, Bolles had won 160 state titles, 101 state runner-up and 543 district titles.

The outdoor field where its seven outdoor sports teams practice is called "George H. Hodges Field" and in 2016 it was converted to an artificial turf.

The swim team was coached by Gregg Troy who went on to coach at the University of Florida and 2012 US Olympic men's team. Troy was followed as head coach by Olympic medalist Sergio Lopez until 2014 when Lopez left to become the Singapore national swimming team's head coach. The current Bolles coach is Peter Verhoef. The school's swimming facility has its own offices, weight room (separate from the weight room that the rest of the school uses), and two swimming pools (one Olympic-sized). As of 2016, the boys swim team has won 39 consecutive Florida state championships and 9 national championships, while the girls' team has won 37 consecutive state championships and 9 different national titles. Bolles has had at least one alumnus or student competing in every Summer Olympics since 1972, including 2016 Summer Olympics gold medal winners Ryan Murphy and Joseph Schooling. The Bolles Sharks, Bolles's club swim team, compete and practice year-round.

The school's football team was coached by Charles "Corky" Rogers from 1989-2016. Rogers is the all-time winningest Florida high school football coach with 466 wins. The team has won eleven state championships, ten under Rogers. He compiled a record of 325-46 during his tenure at the school and his teams never had a losing season.

=== Sports titles ===
Bolles School Championships
Season	Sport	Team	Championship
FALL	Football	Boys	32 District Championships
FALL	Football	Boys	5 times State Runners-up
FALL	Football	Boys	11 State Championships
FALL	Volleyball	Girls	29 District Championships
FALL	Volleyball	Girls	21 Final Four berths
FALL	Volleyball	Girls	7 times State Runners-up
FALL	Volleyball	Girls	2 State Championships
FALL	Golf	Boys	15 District Championships
FALL	Golf	Boys	5 times State Runners-up
FALL	Golf	Boys	2 State Championships
FALL	Golf	Girls	15 District Championships
FALL	Cross Country	Boys	8 District Championships
FALL	Cross Country	Boys	2 times State Runners-up
FALL	Cross Country	Boys	4 State Championships
FALL	Cross Country	Girls	16 District Championships
FALL	Cross Country	Girls	7 times State Runners-up
FALL	Cross Country	Girls	10 State Championships
FALL	Swimming & Diving	Boys	53 District Championships
FALL	Swimming & Diving	Boys	12 times State Runners-up
FALL	Swimming & Diving	Boys	37 State Championships
FALL	Swimming & Diving	Boys	7 times National Runners-up
FALL	Swimming & Diving	Boys	8 National Championships
FALL	Swimming & Diving	Girls	37 District Championships
FALL	Swimming & Diving	Girls	5 times State Runners-up
FALL	Swimming & Diving	Girls	34 State Championships
FALL	Swimming & Diving	Girls	1 time National Runners-up
FALL	Swimming & Diving	Girls	9 National Championships
WINTER	Basketball	Boys	23 District Championships
WINTER	Basketball	Boys	11 Final Four berths
WINTER	Basketball	Boys	5 times State Runners-up
WINTER	Basketball	Boys	4 State Championships
WINTER	Basketball	Girls	3 District Championships
WINTER	Wrestling	Boys	11 District Championships
WINTER	Wrestling	Boys	1 time State Runners-up
WINTER	Wrestling	Boys	2 State Championships
WINTER	Soccer	Boys	20 District Championships
WINTER	Soccer	Boys	18 times Final Four berth
WINTER	Soccer	Boys	4 State Runners-up
WINTER	Soccer	Girls	23 District Championships
WINTER	Soccer	Girls	19 times Final Four berth
WINTER	Soccer	Girls	5 times State Runners-up
WINTER	Soccer	Girls	6 State Championships
SPRING	Baseball	Boys	30 District Championships
SPRING	Baseball	Boys	18 times Final Four berth
SPRING	Baseball	Boys	3 times State Runners-up
SPRING	Baseball	Boys	7 State Championships
SPRING	Softball	Girls	7 District Championships
SPRING	Softball	Girls	2 times State Runners-up
SPRING	Tennis	Boys	36 District Championships
SPRING	Tennis	Boys	10 times State Runners-up
SPRING	Tennis	Boys	2 State Championships
SPRING	Tennis	Girls	37 District Championships
SPRING	Tennis	Girls	8 times State Runners-up
SPRING	Tennis	Girls	4 State Championships
SPRING	Lacrosse	Boys	10 District Championships
SPRING	Weightlifting	Boys	6 times Top 5 in State
SPRING	Crew	Boys	9 State Championship Boats
SPRING	Crew	Girls	11 State Championship Boats
SPRING	Track & Field	Boys	19 District Championships
SPRING	Track & Field	Boys	1 time State Runners-up
SPRING	Track & Field	Boys	1 State Championship
SPRING	Track & Field	Girls	9 District Championships
SPRING	Track & Field	Girls	2 time State Runners-up
SPRING	Track & Field	Girls	2 time State Champion

== Activities ==
=== Fine & Performing Arts ===
The upper school has five performances each year, 13 gallery shows, eight musical concerts, three dance performances, two Coffeehouse performances, two drama showcases and five community art shows. 70% of upper and middle school students participate in the arts. Music, drama and art classes are required in lower school. The school offers 22 performing arts classes and 28 visual arts classes

=== Service ===
Compassion and service are core values at Bolles. There are over 85 Service Clubs with participation opportunities for students in middle and lower schools.

== Notable alumni ==
- Linden Ashby – actor
- Alex Aster – author
- Ron Clark Ball – author
- Jackson Baumeister – professional baseball player
- Chris Bono – American freestyle and folkstlye wrestler, member of three US freestyle World Championship teams and an NCAA wrestling champion at Iowa State
- Gustavo Borges – Brazilian world-record-setting swimmer and 4-time Olympic medalist, competing for Brazil in the 1992, 1996, 2000, and 2004 Olympics.
- George Bovell – Olympic bronze medal swimmer
- Dee Brown – former National Basketball Association player
- Greg Burgess – Olympic silver medal swimmer
- Travis Carroll – former NFL player
- Shaun Chapas – NFL fullback for the Detroit Lions
- Santo Condorelli – 2016 Olympian for Canada
- Jackie Crosby – Pulitzer Prize winning journalist
- Bruce Crump – southern rock musician
- Char-ron Dorsey – former NFL offensive lineman
- Max Ferguson – baseball player in the Boston Red Sox organization
- Brian Ferlin – former NHL player
- Caden Fordham – NFL linebacker for the Tampa Bay Buccaneers
- Javontee Herndon – former NFL player
- Charles Hicks – two-time European U23 Cross Country champion
- Hayden Hurst – NFL tight end for the Los Angeles Chargers
- Jordan Jackson – NFL defensive end for the Denver Broncos
- Trina Jackson – Olympic gold medal swimmer
- Jawan Jamison – former NFL running back
- Chipper Jones – former Major League Baseball player and member of the National Baseball Hall of Fame
- Mac Jones – San Francisco 49ers quarterback
- Joseph Kittinger – United States Air Force pilot, performed the record highest and fastest skydive at over 100,000 feet as a key member of Project Excelsior
- Kay Krill – President/CEO of Ann Inc.
- David Larson – Olympic gold medal swimmer
- Amelia Lewis – LPGA professional golfer. Attended UF in 2009 on a golf scholarship before turning pro. She currently has 57 professional and amateur wins to her name.
- Brian Liesegang – Filter, Nine Inch Nails, Billy Corgan, Veruca Salt; songwriter, producer, musician
- Bailey Chase Luetgert – American stage and television actor
- David López-Zubero – Olympic bronze medal swimmer
- Martin López-Zubero – Olympic gold medal swimmer
- Charles Martin – author
- Andrew G. McCabe – former deputy director of the Federal Bureau of Investigation
- MacKenzie Miller – U.S. Racing Hall of Fame Thoroughbred trainer
- Ryan Murphy – 2016 Olympic gold medalist and swimmer for the Cal Golden Bears.
- Anthony Nesty – Olympic gold medal swimmer for Suriname
- Gram Parsons – country rock musician
- Colin Peek – All-SEC and Academic All-SEC tight end for the University of Alabama 2010 BCS National Championship team and a free agent in the National Football League
- Alexandra Pierson – author
- Daniella Pierson – founder and CEO of The Newsette
- Jack Pyburn – NFL linebacker for the Tampa Bay Buccaneers
- Will Ropp – Actor, The Way Back
- Kevin Sack – The New York Times reporter
- Joseph Schooling – Olympic gold medalist for Singapore.
- Frederick H. Schultz – American businessman and politician
- George Scribner – Disney Director, Imagineer. Directed Oliver & Company. Professional painter.
- Ryan Silverfield – Head football coach, University of Arkansas.
- Riley Skinner – All-ACC quarterback for the Wake Forest University Demon Deacons and NFL New York Giants
- Austin Slater – MLB player with the Tampa Bay Rays
- Jason Spitz – NFL player with the Jacksonville Jaguars
- George B. Stallings Jr. – Served in the Florida House of Representatives from 1959 to 1968
- DJ Stewart – MLB player with the New York Mets
- John Theus – former NFL player.
- David Treadwell – former NFL player
- Travis Tygart – CEO of the U.S. Anti-Doping Agency USADA
- Fred Tyler – Olympic gold medal swimmer
- Arianna Vanderpool-Wallace – Olympic swimmer
- Alexa von Tobel – American businesswoman
- Dez White – former NFL player
- Ashley Whitney – Olympic gold medal swimmer
- Mari Wilensky – 2006 Miss Florida
- Rick Wilkins – former Major League Baseball player

== See also ==
- List of high schools in Florida
