= Liu Jingnan =

Chinese geodesist and educator (born 1943)

- 刘景南

1st Chancellor of Duke Kunshan University
- In office September 20, 2012 – September 1, 2018
- Preceded by: Office established
- Succeeded by: Feng Youmei

President of Wuhan University
- In office 2003–2008
- Succeeded by: Gu Hailiang

Personal details
- Born: July 1, 1943 (age 83) Chongqing, China
- Education: Wuhan Institute of Surveying and Mapping

Liu Jingnan (Chinese: 刘经南; born July 1, 1943) is a Chinese geodesist and educator. He earned his bachelor's and master's degrees at the Wuhan Institute of Surveying and Mapping (now the School of Geodesy and Geomatics, Wuhan University), and worked at Hunan Provincial Coalfield Physical Test Team, Xiangtan Mining Institute and Wuhan University. In 1999, he was elected a member of Chinese Academy of Engineering. He served as the President of Wuhan University from 2003 to 2008, and the inaugural Chancellor of Duke Kunshan University from 2012.

Liu's early research focused on transformation models in satellite positioning technology, and developed several related software systems. And under his leadership developed the first GPS satellite positioning data processing system in China. He also took part in the design of National High Precision GPS Network.
