= Dou Xiankang =

Chinese researcher

- 窦贤康

Director of the National Natural Science Foundation of China
- Incumbent
- Assumed office April 2023
- Minister: Yin Hejun

President of Wuhan University
- In office 6 December 2016 – December 2022
- Preceded by: Li Xiaohong
- Succeeded by: Zhang Pingwen

Personal details
- Born: 23 January 1966 (age 60) Si County, Anhui, China
- Party: Chinese Communist Party (since 1985)
- Education: University of Science and Technology of China; Shanghai International Studies University; Paris Diderot University; Central Party School of the Chinese Communist Party
- Scientific career
- Fields: Space physics

Chinese name
- Simplified Chinese: 窦贤康
- Traditional Chinese: 竇賢康
Transcriptions
Standard Mandarin
- Hanyu Pinyin: Dòu Xiánkāng

Dou Xiankang (Chinese: 窦贤康; born 23 January 1966) is a Chinese space physicist, university administrator and politician, formerly served as president of Wuhan University.

Dou joined the Chinese Communist Party (CCP) in October 1985. He is a delegate to the 13th National People's Congress. He is a representative of the 20th National Congress of the Chinese Communist Party and an alternate of the 20th Central Committee of the Chinese Communist Party. He was a member of the 11th National Committee of the Chinese People's Political Consultative Conference.

== Biography ==
Dou was born in Si County, Anhui, on 23 January 1966. He attended Si County No. 1 High School. He received his master's degree and doctor's degree from the University of Science and Technology of China in 1987 and 1988, respectively. After a short time studying French at the Shanghai International Studies University, he pursued advanced studies in the France, earning his master's degree in 1990 and doctor's degree in 1993 at Paris Diderot University. He carried out postdoctoral research at the French National Scientific Research Center in July 1993.

Dou returned to China in March 1995 and that year became associate professor at the University of Science and Technology of China, and was promoted to full professor in January 2000. He moved up the ranks to become assistant president in November 2003 and vice president in September 2005. He was honored as a Distinguished Young Scholar by the National Science Fund for Distinguished Young Scholars in 2010.

In December 2016, he was appointed president of Wuhan University, a position at vice-ministerial level.

== Honours and awards ==
- 27 November 2017 Member of the Chinese Academy of Sciences (CAS)

Educational offices
Preceded by Li Xiaohong	President of Wuhan University; 2016–2022	Succeeded by Zhang Pingwen
