= Frances Anderson (disambiguation) =

Frances Anderson may refer to:

- Judith Anderson (1897–1992), born Frances Margaret Anderson
- Frances Anderson Center, located in Edmonds, Washington
- Frances Anderson, wife of Robert Needham, 2nd Viscount Kilmorey
- Frances Anderson, Miss Arkansas 1961
- Frances Anderson, art therapist
- Aubrey Anderson-Emmons (born 2007), actor and musician who releases music under the name "Frances Anderson"
- Frances Anderson (1871-1828), billiards player

== See also ==
- Francis Anderson (disambiguation)
