= Liu Yaolin =

Chinese scientist and academic

- 刘耀林

3rd Chancellor of Duke Kunshan University
- Incumbent
- Assumed office 1 September 2023
- Preceded by: Feng Youmei

Personal details
- Education: China University of Geosciences (BS, MS); Wageningen University (PhD)

Liu Yaolin (Chinese: 刘耀林) is a Chinese scientist and academic, currently serving as Chancellor of Duke Kunshan University. Liu previously served as dean of the School of Resources and Environmental Science at Wuhan University. Liu is an expert on geographic information science.
