= Feng Youmei =

Chinese university administrator

- 冯友梅

2nd Chancellor of Duke Kunshan University
- In office September 1, 2018 – September 1, 2023
- Preceded by: Liu Jingnan
- Succeeded by: Liu Yaolin

Personal details
- Born: December 1958 (age 67)
- Education: Tongji Medical College (BMED), (M.Sc)

Feng Youmei (Chinese: 冯友梅) is a Chinese academic and university administrator who served as Chancellor of Duke Kunshan University from 2018 to 2023. Feng previously served as Executive Vice President of Wuhan University and President of Tongji Medical University. Feng is among the few female university chancellors in China.

Feng's prior scholarship includes research in the geriatric disease and cancer fields, along with health system reform.

== Selected works ==
- The effect of neferine on foam cell formation by anti-low density lipoprotein oxidation Journal of Tongji Medical University, 1998
