= Gu Hailiang =

Gu Hailiang (Chinese: 顾海良; born 1951) is a former president of Wuhan University, in the People's Republic of China.

Gu was born in January 1951 in Shanghai. In the 1970s, Gu was working and studying in He County, Anhui Province. From February 1978 to February 1982, Gu studied economics in Anhui University. He then enrolled in the graduate school of Chinese Academy of Social Sciences and obtained a master in economics in December 1984. From 1984 to 1996, he was teaching in Marxism–Leninism Institute in Renmin University, and became its director. Gu was promoted to associate professor in June 1991, and a full professor in 1994, and became doctorate supervisor in 1995. Since 1996, he served in the State Department and the Department of Education. In December 2001, Gu became the vice secretary of CPC committee at Wuhan University. From August 2002 to November 2008, Gu was the CPC chief at Wuhan University, with the rank of deputy minister. From 2008 to 2010, he has served as the president of Wuhan University. He was succeeded by Li Xiaohong.

Academic offices
Preceded by Liu Jingnan	President of Wuhan University; 2008-2010	Succeeded by Li Xiaohong
