= SGG =

SGG may refer to:

- School of Geodesy and Geomatics
- Sermiligaaq Heliport (IATA: SGG)
- Silicon Gulch Gazette, a West Coast Computer Faire-related gazette by Jim Warren between 1977 and 1985
- Societe Generale Group
- Sultanganj railway station (station code:SGG), Bihar, India
- Supergiant Games
- Swiss-German Sign Language (ISO 639:sgg)
- Sega Game Gear
