= Ronald Ball =

Ronald Ball, and variants, may refer to:

- Ron Ball (born 1950), first elected police commissioner (PCC) for Warwickshire
- Ronnie Ball (1927–1984), British jazz musician
- Ron Clark Ball (born 1959), American thriller and suspense novelist
- Ronald Ball, officer killed alongside Arleigh McCree in a 1986 bomb disposal operation in North Hollywood
