= Youmei =

Youmei (Chinese: 友梅) is a Chinese unisex given name. Notable people with the name include:

- Feng Youmei, Chinese university administrator
- Xiao Youmei, Chinese music educator
