= Jack Pyburn =

American football player (born 2003)

No. 54 – Kansas City Chiefs
- Position: Outside linebacker
- Roster status: Practice squad

Personal information
- Born: September 3, 2003 (age 23)
- Listed height: 6 ft 4 in (1.93 m)
- Listed weight: 258 lb (117 kg)

Career information
- High school: The Bolles School (Jacksonville, Florida)
- College: Florida (2022–2024); LSU (2025)
- NFL draft: 2026: undrafted

Career history
- Tampa Bay Buccaneers (2026)*; Kansas City Chiefs (2026–present)
- * Offseason or practice squad member only
- Stats at Pro Football Reference

Jack Pyburn (born September 3, 2003) is an American professional football outside linebacker for the Kansas City Chiefs of the National Football League (NFL). He played college football for the LSU Tigers and Florida Gators.

== Early life ==
Pyburn attended The Bolles School in Jacksonville, Florida. He was rated as a three-star recruit, the 36th overall defensive end, and the 441st overall player in the class of 2022. Pyburn committed to play college football for the Florida Gators.

== College career ==
During his freshman season at Florida in 2022, Pyburn recorded three tackles. In 2023, he totaled 17 tackles with one for a loss before his season was cut short after nine games due to an ACL injury. In week four of the 2024 season, Pyburn totaled six tackles with one going for a loss in a win over Mississippi State. In week 12, he recorded eight tackles in a victory over LSU. Pyburn finished the 2024 season with 60 tackles with four being for a loss, a sack, a forced fumble, and an interception. After the season, he entered his name into the NCAA transfer portal.

Pyburn transferred to play for the LSU Tigers. He entered the 2025 season as a starter on the Tigers defensive line. For his performance during the 2025 season, Pyburn accepted an invitation to participate in the 2026 Senior Bowl.

== Professional career ==
Pre-draft measurables
Height	Weight	Arm length	Hand span	Wingspan	20-yard shuttle	Three-cone drill	Broad jump
6 ft 3 7/8 in (1.93 m)	258 lb (117 kg)	30 7/8 in (0.78 m)	10 in (0.25 m)	6 ft 5 3/8 in (1.97 m)	4.45 s	7.40 s	9 ft 1 in (2.77 m)
All values from NFL Combine/Pro Day

=== Tampa Bay Buccaneers ===
Pyburn signed with the Tampa Bay Buccaneers as an undrafted free agent on May 8, 2026. On August 30, he was waived by the Buccaneers as a part of final roster cuts.

=== Kansas City Chiefs ===
On August 31, 2026, Pyburn was claimed off waivers by the Kansas City Chiefs. He was waived on November 10 and re-signed to the practice squad two days later.
