= Li Xiaohong =

Chinese engineer and educator

- 李晓红

President of the Chinese Academy of Engineering
- In office June 2018 – July 2026
- Preceded by: Zhou Ji
- Succeeded by: Zhang Yuzhuo

President of Wuhan University
- In office December 2010 – October 2016
- Preceded by: Gu Hailiang
- Succeeded by: Dou Xiankang

President of Chongqing University
- In office January 2003 – December 2010
- Preceded by: Wu Zhongfu
- Succeeded by: Lin Jianhua

Personal details
- Born: June 1959 (age 67) Hechuan, Chongqing, China
- Party: Chinese Communist Party
- Education: Chongqing University
- Scientific career
- Fields: Mining engineering
- Workplaces: Chongqing University; Wuhan University

Li Xiaohong (simplified Chinese: 李晓红; traditional Chinese: 李曉紅; pinyin: Lǐ Xiǎohóng; born June 1959) is a Chinese engineer and educator. He served as the president of Chongqing University from 2003 to 2010, and was appointed the president of Wuhan University in 2010. In 2011, he was elected as a member of the Chinese Academy of Engineering (CAE), and served as the president of the CAE from 2018 to 2026. As a researcher, Li's main interests are in the field of mining engineering. He made contributions to the development of water jet cutters in China, and established new equations about jet parameters and cutting effection, so the use of abrasive jet could be improved.

== Life and career ==
Li was born into a rural family; he once served as a commune cadre in 1975. In 1978, he entered the Mining Engineering Department, Chongqing University, and was appointed the party secretary of the department after he graduated in 1982. From June 1989, he trained at UC Berkeley for 3 years. In 1993, he received his doctor's degree in engineering from Chongqing University. Then he served as a visiting scholar at UQ from March to August 1996. Li later served as the dean of College of Resources and Environmental Engineering, Chongqing University, from 1994 to 1998. He served as the president of Chongqing University from 2003 to 2010, and the president of Wuhan University from 2010 to 2016.

== Research ==
Li began to develop Water Jet TBM Tunneling Machine when trained at UC Berkeley. There, he spent two years to make the machine capable of crushing stones which are extremely hard. He continued this research after he returned to Chongqing University. He finally developed a method of rock crushing, containing eroding coal rock with water jet, crack extension, washing away the debris, and cooling the cutting-tools.

Li and his colleagues studied the mechanism of abrasive mixing in self-oscillation flow, and measured its effects on main parameters, so they could develop the equations about jet parameters and cutting effection. Consequently, they could infer the relation between characteristics of wear particles and effect of cavitation in pulsed abrasive water jet. Based on this, they proposed a design standard of pulsed abrasive water jet nozzles.

Educational offices
Preceded by Wu Zhongfu	President of Chongqing University; 2003–2010	Succeeded by Lin Jianhua
Preceded by Gu Hailiang	President of Wuhan University; 2010–2016	Succeeded by Dou Xiankang
Academic offices
Preceded by Zhou Ji	President of the Chinese Academy of Engineering; 2018–2026	Succeeded by Zhang Yuzhuo
