= George B. Stallings Jr. =

Florida politician (1918–2018)

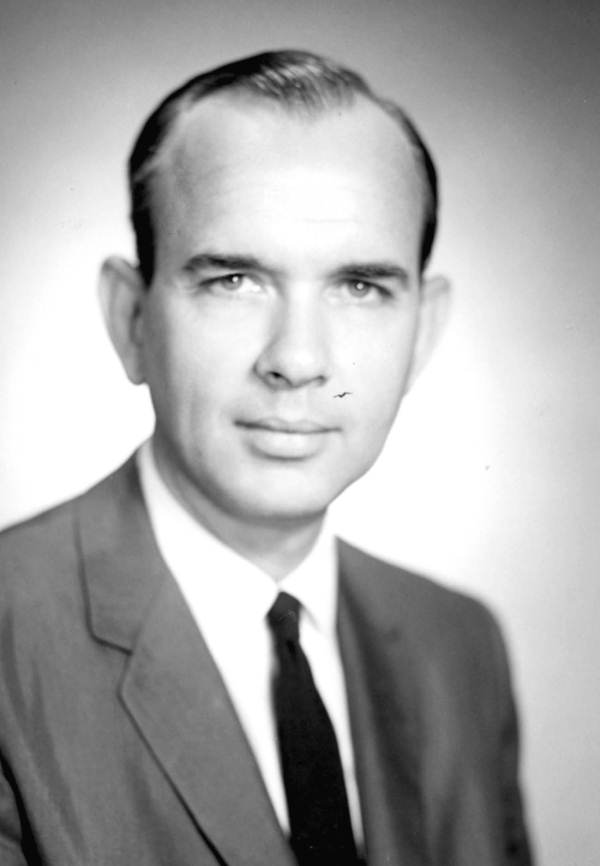

Member of the Florida House of Representatives from the 20th district
- In office 1959–1968

Personal details
- Born: May 12, 1918 Jacksonville, Florida, U.S.
- Died: September 30, 2018 (aged 100) Jacksonville, Florida, U.S.
- Party: Democratic
- Spouse(s): Marguerite Hamilton; Martha Ullmann
- Education: University of Virginia, University of Florida
- Occupation: Attorney

Military service
- Branch/service: United States Army
- Years of service: 1941-1945
- Rank: Captain
- Battles/wars: World War II

George B. Stallings Jr. (May 12, 1918 – September 30, 2018) was an American lawyer and politician. He served in the Florida House of Representatives from 1959 to 1968, representing the 20th district.

== Early life ==
Stallings was born May 12, 1918, in Jacksonville, Florida. He was born to George B. Stallings Sr. and Carolyn Dohme Stallings. As a youth he attended The Bolles School. He was a part of the second admitting class. After graduating he attended the University of Virginia, while in his senior year he was drafted. He enlisted with the Army Air Corps on March 3, 1941. After nine months of training at MacDill Air Force Base he became a commissioned officer. He served as a flight instructor teaching pilots how to fly the B-24 Liberator. He obtained the rank of Captain while in the service.

== Career ==
Stallings started practicing law after graduating from the University of Florida. He was an attorney for 38 years. He was elected to the 20th district of the Florida House of Representatives, he served from 1959 to 1968. While in office, he was head of the Judiciary Committee. After retiring from the legislator, he served as the general counsel of the Florida Retail Federation. He lobbied 13 years for them.

== Personal life ==
Stallings first marriage was to a woman named Marguerite Hamilton, a war widow, in 1946. They had 3 daughters together: Ann, Margo, and Debbie. Hamilton died in 1984. Stallings later remarried to Martha Ullmann on November 25, 1995. He turned 100 in May 2018 and died on September 30.
