= Francis Anderson =

Francis Anderson may refer to:

- Sir Francis Anderson (philosopher) (1858–1941), Australian philosopher and educationist
- Francis T. Anderson (1808–1887), Virginia judge
- Sir Francis Anderson (MP for Newcastle-upon-Tyne) (1614–1679), English Royalist and politician
- Francis Sheed Anderson (1897–1966), Scottish businessman, civil servant and politician
- Francis Evelyn Anderson (1752–1821), British Army officer and politician, MP for Great Grimsby, and for Beverley

== See also ==
- Frank Anderson (disambiguation)
- Frances Anderson (disambiguation)
- Francis Andersen (1925–2020), Australian scholar
