= Zhang Pingwen =

Chinese mathematician

- 张平文
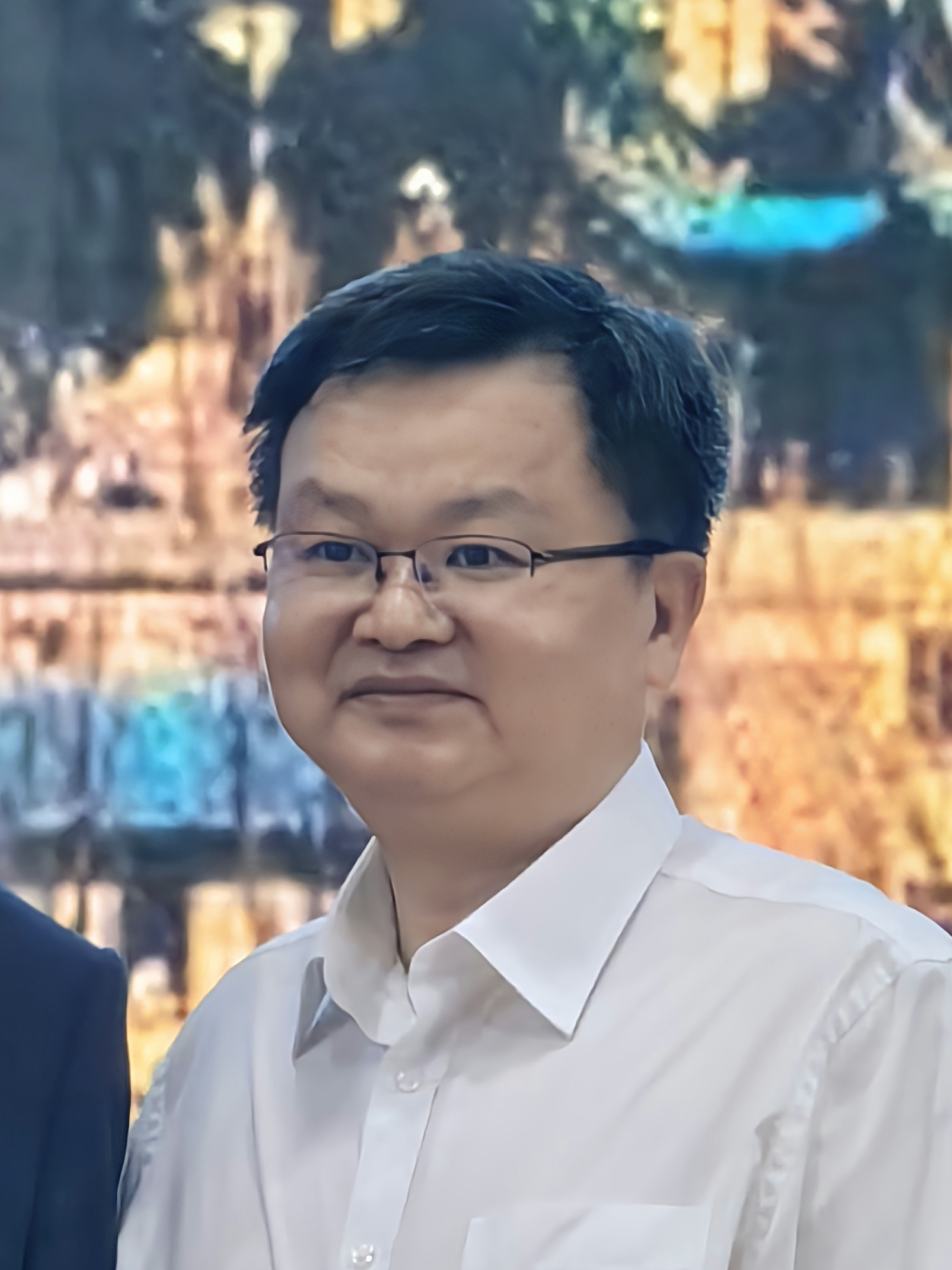

President of Wuhan University
- Incumbent
- Assumed office 28 December 2022
- Preceded by: Dou Xiankang

Personal details
- Born: July 1966 (age 60) Changsha County, Hunan, China
- Party: Chinese Communist Party
- Education: Peking University
- Scientific career
- Fields: Mathematics
- Workplaces: Peking University; Wuhan University
- Doctoral advisor: Ying Long'an (应隆安)

Chinese name
- Simplified Chinese: 张平文
- Traditional Chinese: 張平文
Transcriptions
Standard Mandarin
- Hanyu Pinyin: Zhāng Píngwén

Zhang Pingwen (Chinese: 张平文; born July 1966) is a Chinese mathematician and university administrator, currently serving as president of Wuhan University. He is an academician of the Chinese Academy of Sciences.

== Biography ==
Zhang was born in Changsha County, Hunan, in July 1966. He attended Changsha County No. 1 High School. In 1984, he was accepted to Peking University, where he majored in the Department of Mathematics.

After graduating in 1992, Zhang stayed and worked at Peking University, where he was promoted to associate professor in 1994 and to full professor in 1996. In 2015, he was appointed director of the Discipline Construction Office of Peking University, a post he kept until 2019, when he became director of the Peking University Big Data Science Research Center. He moved up the ranks to become assistant president in August 2019 and vice president in December of that same year.

On 28 December 2022, the Organization Department of the Chinese Communist Party appointed Zhang as president of Wuhan University, a position at vice-ministerial level.

== Honours and awards ==
- 1999 Feng Kang Prize
- 2014 State Natural Science Award (Second Class)
- 2015 Member of the Chinese Academy of Sciences (CAS)
- November 2016 Fellow of The World Academy of Sciences (TWAS)
- 2020 Fellow of the Society for Industrial and Applied Mathematics (SIAM)
- 2021 Science and Technology Progress Award of the Ho Leung Ho Lee Foundation

Educational offices
Preceded by Dou Xiankang	President of Wuhan University; 2022–present	Incumbent
