= Frank Anderson =

Frank Anderson may refer to:

== Politics and law ==
- Frank Anderson (judge) (1870–1931), American jurist, justice of the South Dakota Supreme Court
- Frank Anderson (politician) (1889–1959), British Labour Party member of parliament for Whitehaven, 1935–1959
- Frank Anderson (Manitoba politician), Canadian politician (see 1962 Manitoba general election)

== Sports ==
- Frank B. Anderson (1882–1966), American college baseball and football coach
- Frank G. Anderson (1891–1985), American college football coach
- Frank T. Anderson (1902–???), American tennis player
- Frank Anderson (footballer, born 1913) (1913–1997), Australian rules footballer for Carlton
- Frank Anderson (footballer, born 1916) (1916–1971), Australian rules footballer for North Melbourne
- Frank Anderson (chess player) (1928–1980), Canadian chess master
- Frank Anderson (Canadian football) (1928–1983), American football player in the Canadian Football League
- Frank Anderson (baseball coach) (born 1959), American college baseball coach
- Frank Anderson (rugby union) (born 1945), English rugby union player

== Others ==
- Frank Maloy Anderson (1871–1961), American historian, professor, and writer
- Frank P. Anderson (fl. 1906), American civic leader, member of the Committee of Fifty
- Frank J. Anderson (1938–2022), American police officer, sheriff of Marion County, Indiana
- Frank L. Anderson (born 1957), American animator, director, author, and musician
- Frank Anderson (intelligence officer) (1942–2020), American intelligence officer and spymaster

== See also ==
- Frank Andersson (1956–2018), Swedish wrestler
- Francis Anderson (disambiguation)
