= Daniella Pierson =

Colombian-American entrepreneur

- Born: August 4, 1995 (age 31)
- Citizenship: Colombian-American
- Education: Boston University
- Title: Founder and CEO of The Newsette, Co-founder of Wondermind.
- Relatives: Alex Aster (sister)

Daniella Pierson (born August 4, 1995) is a Colombian-American entrepreneur. She is the founder and CEO of The Newsette, a women's media company, and co-founder of Wondermind, a mental fitness startup. In 2022, Forbes called her the youngest wealthiest self-made BIPOC woman. In 2025, Forbes called her a cautionary tale of hubris, using 'Smoke and Mirrors' to falsely claim being on the magazine's board, among other professional exaggerations.

== Early life and education ==
Pierson was born Jacksonville, Florida, to Keith Pierson, who is originally from Niagara Falls, New York, and Claudy Pierson, who is from Colombia. Her twin sister, Alex Aster is a young adult author. She attended Boston University, where she launched The Newsette as a sophomore in 2015. Initially, the newsletter was distributed to eight subscribers, focusing on topics such as business, fashion, beauty, and technology.

== Career ==
=== The Newsette ===
Pierson founded The Newsette in 2015, which is a daily newsletter designed to bring the experience of a magazine to email inboxes. By 2022, it reached over 500,000 subscribers, primarily women aged 18 to 35. The company reported $40 million in revenue in 2021 and was valued at $200 million.

=== Wondermind ===
In 2022, Pierson co-founded Wondermind alongside actress and singer Selena Gomez and producer Mandy Teefey. The startup focuses on mental fitness. It was valued at $100 million shortly after its launch.

=== Chasm ===
In 2025, Pierson launched Chasm, an initiative created to close the gender gap in entrepreneurship by dispersing grants from high-profile members to young, female entrepreneurs.

== Recognition ==
Pierson has been recognized as one of the wealthiest self-made women in the United States, with a net worth of $220 million as of 2022. She was featured on Forbes’ 2020 “30 Under 30” list in the media category. She was also awarded Boston University's 2023 Distinguished Young Alumni Award.
