= Ivylyn Girardeau =

American medical missionary

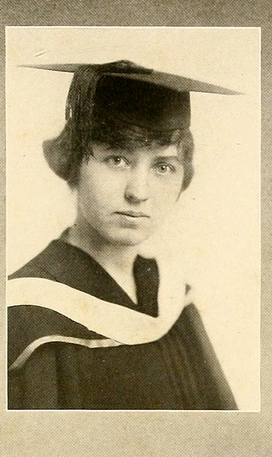
- in 1922 yearbook of Agnes Scott College
- Born: Ivylyn Lee Girardeau; October 16, 1900; Thomaston, Georgia, U.S.
- Died: September 11, 1987 (aged 86)
- Burial place: Upson County, Georgia
- Education: Agnes Scott College, Tulane University
- Occupations: medical doctor, missionary
- Known for: missionary in India and Pakistan
- Parents: John Bohun Girardeau (father); Emma Trice Girardeau (mother)

Ivylyn Lee Girardeau (October 16, 1900 — September 11, 1987) was an American medical doctor and missionary in India and Pakistan.

== Early life ==
Ivylyn Lee Girardeau was from Thomaston, Georgia, the daughter of John Bohun Girardeau and Emma Trice Girardeau.

Ivylyn Girardeau attended Agnes Scott College, graduating in 1922, and earned her medical degree in 1931, at Tulane University.

== Career ==
Girardeau traveled to India with sponsorship from the Woman's Union Missionary Society (WUMS). She learned to speak Hindi and Urdu. From 1933 to 1945 she ran a fifty-bed facility, the Mary Ackerman Hoyt Memorial Hospital in Jhansi, mainly providing obstetric care.

In the United States, Girardeau served her internship at the Women and Children's Hospital in Boston. When she was in the United States on extended furloughs in the 1940s and 1950s, she toured and gave lectures about her work at churches and for civic clubs. "It is the most fascinating country in the world — and potentially one of the most powerful or dangerous," she told Atlanta Constitution readers in 1945. At age 72, she went to Pakistan and India again, as a medical relief worker. She was a pediatrician in Thomaston, and on the original staff of the Upson Regional Medical Hospital.

== Personal life and legacy ==
Ivylyn Girardeau died in 1987, aged 86 years. Her gravesite is in Upson County.

Girardeau House, a Christian orphanage and school in Uganda, is named for Ivylyn Girardeau. There are two folders of papers related to Ivylyn Girardeau's work in the Records of the Woman's Union Missionary Society, at the Billy Graham Center in Wheaton, Illinois.
