= School of Geodesy and Geomatics, Wuhan University =

School of Wuhan University, China

Coordinates: 30.5259°N 114.3619°E

- 武汉大学测绘学院
- Motto: 敬业 乐群 求是 拓新
- Motto in English: Work hard, Get along well, Aspire after truth and Blaze new trails
- Type: Public
- Established: 1956
- President: Yao Yibin (姚宜斌)
- Location: Wuhan, Hubei, China
- Campus: Urban
- Website: www.sgg.whu.edu.cn

The School of Geodesy and Geomatics, Wuhan University (Chinese: 武汉大学测绘学院; pinyin: Wǔhàn Dàxué Cèhuì Xuéyuàn) is one of 27 schools in Wuhan University, Hubei province in China. Formerly the Wuhan Technical University of Surveying and Mapping (Chinese: 武汉测绘科技大学), it was merged into Wuhan University in 2000.

== Location ==
It is located at No.129 Luoyu Road, Hongshan District, Wuhan, Hubei Province.

== History ==
The school was founded in 1956 as the Wuhan Institute of Surveying and Mapping. In 1958, the State Surveying and Mapping Bureau of China took charge of the college. In 1985, it was renamed as Wuhan Technical University of Surveying and Mapping. In 1993, the department of Geodesy and Engineering Survey was merged into the university and renamed it as School of Geoscience and Surveying Engineering of the university. In February 2000, the Ministry of Education of took charge of the university and merged it into Wuhan University as its School of Geodesy and Geomatics.
