= Marilyn Breen =

Mathematician

- Born: 1944
- Citizenship: United States
- Education: Clemson University
- Known for: Geometry, polygons
- Awards: Fellow of the American Mathematical Society
- Scientific career
- Fields: Mathematics
- Workplaces: University of Oklahoma
- Thesis: A Determination of the Combinatorial Type of a Polytope by Radon Partitions (1997)
- Doctoral advisor: William Ray Hare Jr.

Marilyn Janet Breen (born 1944) is a professor of mathematics at the University of Oklahoma. Her research involves geometry, including visibility and orthogonal polygons.

== Life and work ==
Breen graduated in 1966 from Agnes Scott College, and received her Ph.D. from Clemson University in 1970 under the supervision of William Ray Hare Jr. She joined the Oklahoma faculty in 1971 and was promoted to full professor in 1982.

== Awards and honors ==
In her time at the University of Oklahoma, Breen won several awards for teaching and research, including an "outstanding teacher" award.

In 2012, Breen became a fellow of the American Mathematical Society.

== Selected publications ==
- Breen, Marilyn (1992), "Staircase kernels in orthogonal polygons", Archiv der Mathematik, 59 (6): 588–594, doi:10.1007/BF01194852
- Breen, Marilyn (1994), "An improved Krasnoselʹskiĭ-type theorem for orthogonal polygons which are starshaped via staircase paths", Journal of Geometry, 51 (1–2): 31–35, doi:10.1007/BF01226854
- Breen, Marilyn; Kay, David C. (1976), "General decomposition theorems for m-convex sets in the plane", Israel Journal of Mathematics, 24 (3–4): 217–233, doi:10.1007/BF02834753
