= Andrea Abrams =

American anthropologist

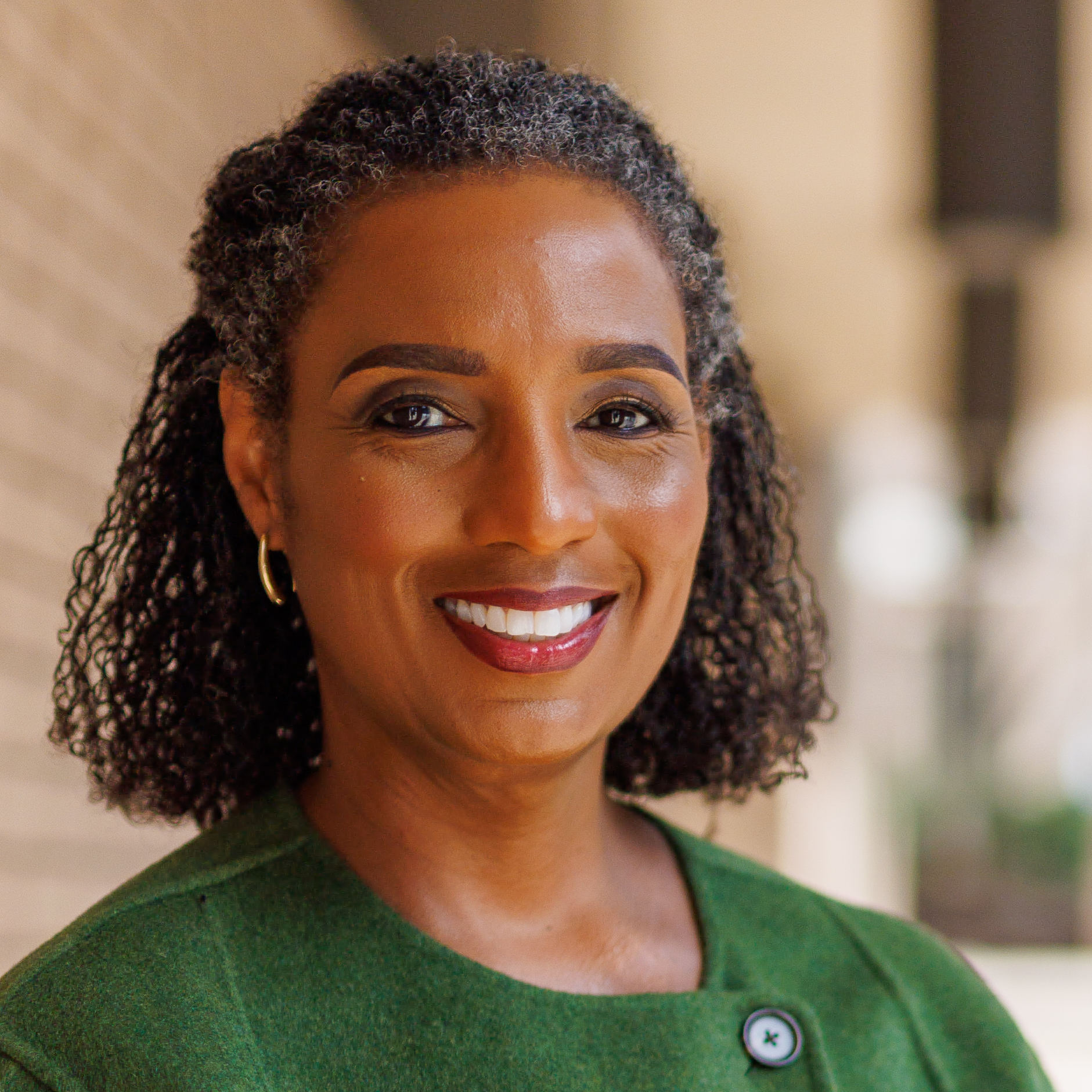
Headshot of Abrams by Mark Morrin

Dr. Andrea Abrams is the Executive Director of Defending American Values Coalition (DAVC), a non-profit organization focused on diversity, equity and inclusion (DEI). DAVC is part of the American Pride Rises Network.

Abrams previously served as the Vice President for Diversity, Equity, and Inclusion and an associate professor of anthropology, gender studies and African American studies at Centre College in Danville, Kentucky. Abrams' research and teaching focus on race, gender, and social justice. She earned a graduate certificate in women's studies and a PH.D. in an anthropology from Emory University. She is also the author of God and Blackness: Race, Gender and Identity in a Middle Class Afrocentric Church.

== Biography ==
Abrams completed undergraduate studies at Agnes Scott College, earning a B.A. in sociology and anthropology. Continuing on to receive her M.A. in anthropology, a graduate certificate in women's studies, and a Ph.D. in anthropology from Emory University. Andrea Abrams is the President of the Association of Black Anthropologists (2017–2018). Abrams previously taught at the University of Southern Mississippi, Emory University, Agnes Scott College, and Spelman College.

== Research and publications ==
Abrams' research focuses on racial and gender issues in the south, specifically studying the discussion and performance of racial identities. Abrams' dissertation work focused on fieldwork in Atlanta, GA, at First Afrikan Presbyterian Church, observing ways that this church defined blackness, expressed their religion and how this intersected with gender and race. Andrea's book God and Blackness: Race, Gender and Identity in a Middle Class Afrocentric Church is a product of her research in Georgia, addressing how African American religious institutions build community and create a shared understanding of blackness. Abrams reports directly on the churches members views on issues of blackness, the middle-class, feminism and identity, and how to navigate the tension of these topics as middle Class African Americans.

== Personal ==
Dr. Andrea Abrams is one of six children born to Reverend Carolyn and Reverend Robert Abrams, originally of Mississippi. Her siblings include U.S. district judge Leslie Abrams Gardner, Richard Abrams, Walter Abrams, Dr. Jeanine Abrams McLean, a former CDC researcher and voting rights advocate, and Stacey Abrams, a lawyer, politician, and voting rights advocate.
