= Caroline Frederick =

American politician

Carolyn E. Frederick is an American politician, and a former member of the South Carolina House of Representatives for District 22 from 1972 to 1976. Frederick was a member of the Republican Party.

Elected in 1967 to represent Greenville County, Frederick was the first Republican woman elected to the House. Born in Atlanta, she moved to Greenville in 1949. A 1928 Agnes Scott graduate, Mrs. Frederick was a newspaper writer, advertising executive, and at the time of House service, a public relations consultant. She also served as public relations director for the YWCA from 1958 to 1964. Among her many activities and affiliations, Mrs. Frederick was the manager of the Greenville Symphony from 1954 to 1970 and executive director of the Greenville Arts Festival from 1963 to 1965. She was a member of the Higher Education Tuition Grants Commission and a 1970 presidential appointee to the advisory commission of the John F. Kennedy Center for the Performing Arts. Mrs. Frederick served in the House from 1967 to 1976 and was on the House Education and Public Works Committee and the Interstate Cooperation Committee.

In 1972, Frederick presented H.3092, the South Carolina Equal Rights Amendment (ERA), introduced as a Joint Resolution into the SC House of Representatives. On that day it passed the first and second readings, 83-0, and was ordered to a third reading. The third reading was held and passed on March 30, 1972, and the Joint Resolution was forwarded to the Senate. Although the Senate did not pass the Joint Resolution, South Carolina did consider ratification of the ERA on March 22, 1972 — the same day Congress sent the amendment to the states.
