= Chesya Burke =

American novelist

- Burke at World Fantasy Convention 2026
- Citizenship: United States
- Education: Agnes Scott College; Georgia State University; University of Florida (PhD)
- Occupation: Writer
- Writing career
- Language: English
- Genres: Horror fiction Dark fantasy
- Notable work: Let's Play White

Chesya Burke is an American editor, educator and author of comic books and speculative fiction, most notably in the genres of horror and dark fantasy. She has published over a hundred short stories, essays, and articles in magazines and anthologies such as Out There Screaming: An Anthology of New Black Horror, Clarkesworld, Apex Magazine, Nightmare Magazine, and Stories for Chip: A Tribute to Samuel R. Delany. Her short story collection Let's Play White was published in 2011 while her debut novel, The Strange Crimes of Little Africa, was released in late 2015. Nikki Giovanni has compared Burke's fiction to that of Octavia Butler and Toni Morrison.

== Life ==
Burke grew up in Hopkinsville, Kentucky. She earned a double major in Africana Studies and English from Agnes Scott College and a Masters in African-American studies from Georgia State University. Her master's thesis was on Storm from The X-Men. Burke earned her Ph.D. in English at the University of Florida. She is active in literary and feminist communities, for example serving as co-chair of the Board of Directors of Charis Circle, the nonprofit programming arm of Charis Books & More, the Atlanta area's independent feminist bookstore.

== Fiction ==
Burke's first full-length short story collection Let's Play White was published in 2011 by Apex Publications. The collection was favorably reviewed in the Midwest Book Review, Austin Post and Publishers Weekly. A follow-up to the collection, Let's Play White, Too, will be released in June 2027 by Apex Publications.

Burke's debut novel The Strange Crimes of Little Africa was published in late 2015 by RothCo Press. The novel is a mystery set during the 1920s Harlem Renaissance and features a Black detective who realizes "she may have to sacrifice her cousin's freedom when she discovers evidence that her father, the first black traffic cop on the force, may be guilty of murder." The novel features an appearance by a fictional version of Zora Neale Hurston.

== Nonfiction and scholarly writing ==
Burke has written essays and articles for a number of magazines and anthologies, including Clarkesworld, Nightmare Magazine, and the African American National Biography Project. Her scholarly book Hero Me Not: The Containment of the Most Powerful Black, Female Superhero was published in 2023 by Rutgers University Press. In the book, Burke "investigates how stereotypes and controlling images of Black women place significant limitations and burdens on one of comics media’s most recognizable Black superheroines: Ororo Munroe, better known as Storm of X-Men fame."

== Critical reception ==
Burke is known for blending different genres together with her writings. Reviewers have praised Burke's fiction, with the Barnes and Nobles Book Club calling her writing "mesmerizing -- there is an undeniable lyricism there but also a tangible darkness and pain." Samuel R. Delany called her a "formidable new master of the macabre" while poet Nikki Giovanni has compared Burke's writing to that of Octavia Butler and Toni Morrison

In describing Burke's collection Let's Play White, Publishers Weekly said "the depth of Burke's characters, the weight of their decisions, and their choices make this the very opposite of escapist fantasy." Writing in The Magazine of Fantasy & Science Fiction, Chris Moriarty praised the collection as "an intelligent and fiecely humorous book," adding that Burke's examination of the complexity of race and gender roles "makes her a worthy heir to writers like James Baldwin and James Tiptree Jr.."

Her short story "An American Fable" in Out There Screaming: An Anthology of New Black Horror, edited by Jordan Peele and John Joseph Adams, was praised for turning a scary ghost story into a work of "spiritual deliverance and kinship."

A class of undergraduate English students at Michigan State University created a website analyzing the themes of her short story collection through the lens of Black feminism, as embodied in the work of Patricia Hill Collins and Barbara Christian.

== Bibliography ==
=== Novels ===
- The Strange Crimes of Little Africa, RothCo Press (December 2015)

=== Collections and anthologies ===
- Let's Play White, Too, Apex Publications (2027)
- Let's Play White, Apex Publications (2011)

=== Critical work ===
- Hero Me Not: The Containment of the Most Powerful Black, Female Superhero (Rutgers University Press, 2023)
- "The H Word: The H is for Harassment (a/k/a Horror's Misogyny Problem)," Nightmare Magazine (2014)
- "Super Duper Sexual Spiritual Black Woman," Clarkesworld (2012)
- "Race and the Walking Dead" (2011)

=== Selected short stories ===
- "An American Fable" in Out There Screaming: An Anthology of New Black Horror, edited by Jordan Peele and John Joseph Adams (Random House, 2023)
- "Haint Me Too" in Hex Life: Wicked New Tales of Witchery, edited by Christopher Golden and Rachel Autumn Deering (Titan Books, 2019)
- "Say, She Toy", 2017 Locus Recommended Short Story, Apex Magazine (2017)
- "Shiv", Outside, a graphic anthology of new horror fiction with art by Jennifer Y Cruté, Ash Pure and Topics Press (2017)
- "In the Quad of Project 327," Cassilda's Song edited by Joseph S. Pulver, Sr. (forthcoming in 2016)
- "Cut. Pour.", The Daughters of Inanna, Thunderstorm Books (2015)
- "For Sale: Fantasy Coffin (Ababuo Need Not Apply)," Stories for Chip: A Tribute to Samuel R. Delany (2015)
- "Please, Momma," Nightmare Magazine (2015)
- "I Make People Do Bad Things," Nightmare Magazine (2014)
- "The Horror at Castle Cumberland," Letters to Lovecraft: Eighteen Whispers to the Darkness, Stone Skin Press (2014)
- "Mountaintown," Shadows Over Main Street edited by Doug Murano & D. Alexander Ward, Hazardous Press (2014)
- "The Teachings and Redemptions of Ms. Fannie Lou Mason," Apex Publications, (2011)
- "CUE: Change," Apex Publications, (2011)
- "Purse," Apex Publications, (2011)
- "What She Saw When They Flew Away," Apex Publications, (2011)
- "I Make People Do Bad Things," Apex Publications, (2011)
- "Walter and the Three-Legged King," Apex Publications, (2011)
- "The Unremembered," Dark Faith (2010)
- "My Sister's Keeper," Whispers in the Night edited by Brandon Massey, Dafina Press (2007)
- "The Light of Cree," Voices From the Other Side (2006)
- "He Who Takes Away the Pain," Dark Dreams (2004)
- "The Room Where Ben Disappeared," Would That It Were (2004)
- "Chocolate Park," Undaunted Press (2004)
