= Chinese Academy of Engineering =

National academy of the People's Republic of China

- 中国工程院
- 2024 Logo of the Academy

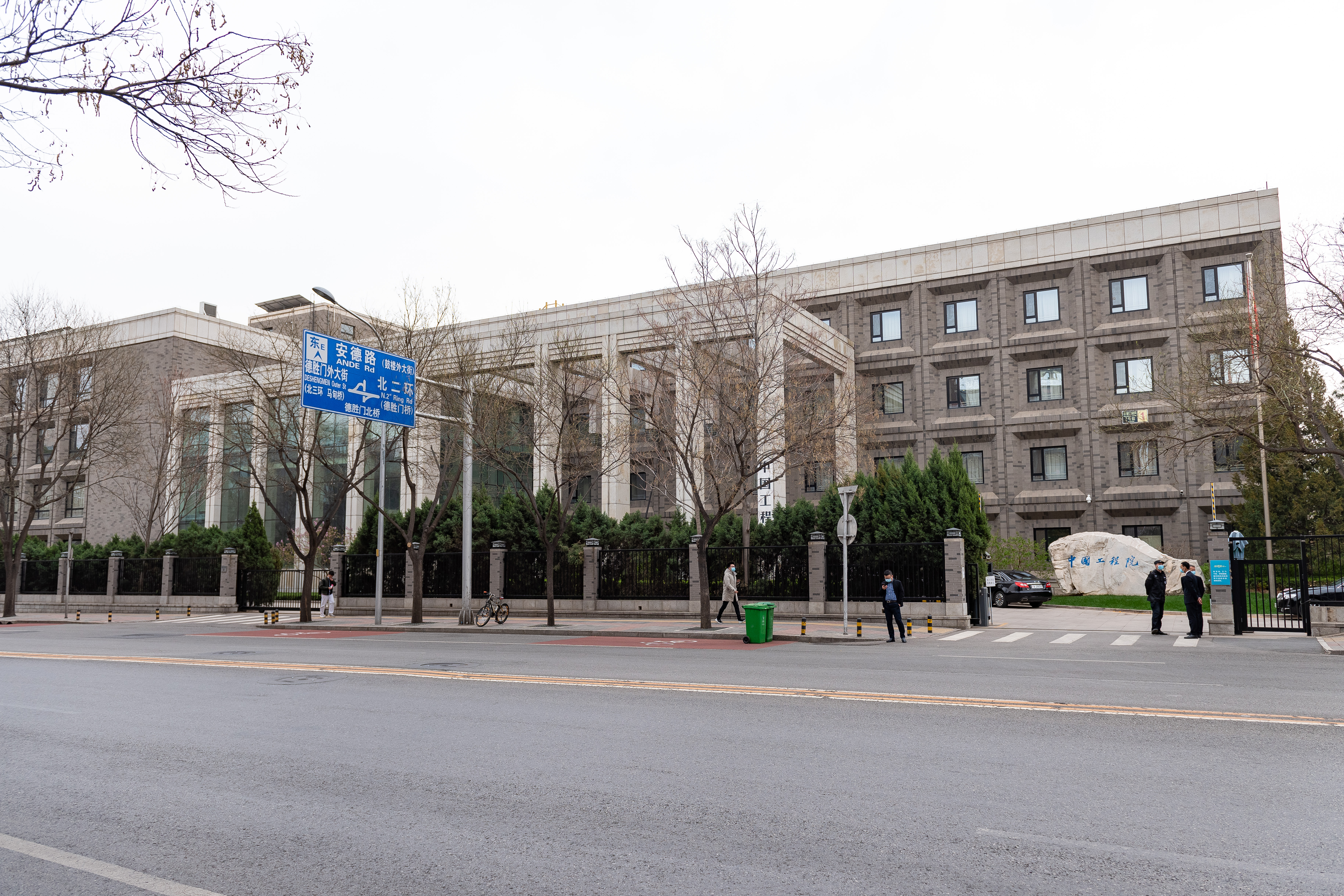
- Academy Building in 2021

Agency overview
- Formed: 1994; 32 years ago
- Headquarters: Beijing, China
- Agency executive: Zhang Yuzhuo, President
- Parent department: State Council of China
- Website: cae.cn

Chinese Academy of Engineering
- Simplified Chinese: 中国工程院
- Traditional Chinese: 中國工程院
Transcriptions
Standard Mandarin
- Hanyu Pinyin: Zhōngguó Gōngchéng Yuàn
- IPA: [ʈʂʊ́ŋ.kwǒ kʊ́ŋ.ʈʂʰə̌ŋ ɥɛ̂n]

The Chinese Academy of Engineering (CAE; 中国工程院) is the national academy of the People's Republic of China for engineering. It was established in 1994 and is an institution of the State Council of China. The CAE and the Chinese Academy of Sciences are often referred to together as the "Two Academies". Its current president is Li Xiaohong.

Since its establishment, CAE has provided consultancy to the State on key programs, planning, guidelines, and policies at the request of government ministries and commissions. In response to requests from central and local government ministries, the academy has mobilized its members to conduct surveys, offer strategic opinions, and make proposals. These projects have been instrumental in enhancing member participation in the State's major decision-making processes. Additionally, members have regularly and actively contributed their insights and suggestions based on their experience, perspectives, and awareness of international engineering science and technology trends.

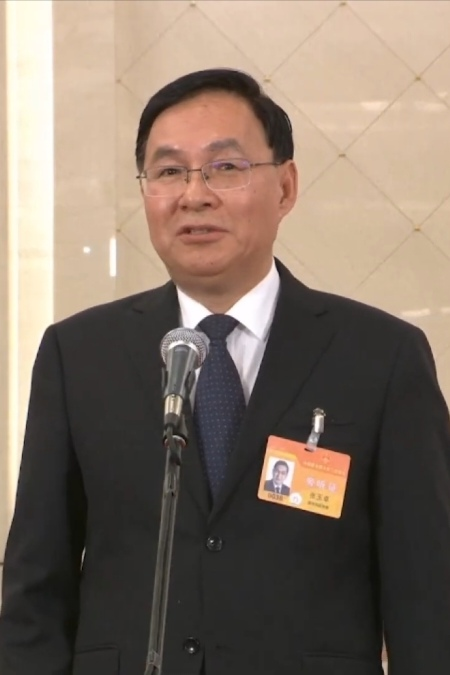
Zhang Yuzhuo, current CAE President since 2026

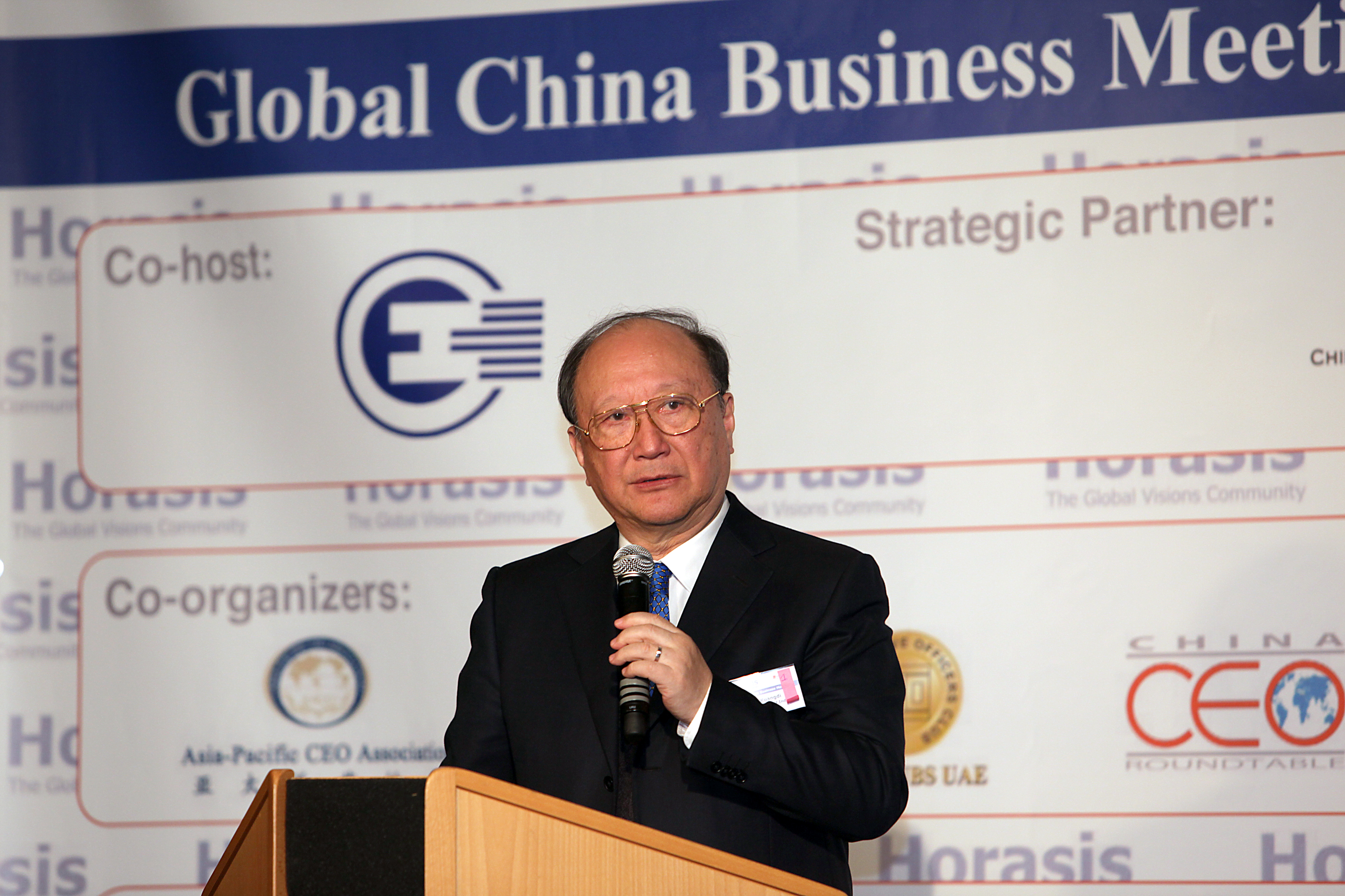
Xu Kuangdi, CAE President (2002-2010)

== List of presidents ==
1. Zhu Guangya (1994–1998)
2. Song Jian (1998–2002)
3. Xu Kuangdi (2002–2010)
4. Zhou Ji (2010–2018)
5. Li Xiaohong (2018–2026)
6. Zhang Yuzhuo (2026–present)

== Structure ==
The CAE is composed of elected members from the community of engineering and technological sciences. The General Assembly of the CAE is the highest decision-making body of the academy and is held during the first week of June bi-annually.

== Membership ==
Membership of Chinese Academy of Engineering is the highest academic title in engineering science and technology in China. It is a lifelong appointment and must be elected by existing members.

The academy consists of members, senior members and foreign members, who are recognized for their respective field of engineering. As of January 2020, the academy has 920 Chinese members, in addition to 93 foreigner members. The composition of its members include:

- Division of Mechanical and Vehicle Engineering: 130 members
- Division of Information and Electronic Engineering: 131 members
- Division of Chemical, Metallurgical and Materials Engineering: 115 members
- Division of Energy and Mining Engineering: 125 members
- Division of Civil and Hydraulic Engineering and Architecture: 110 members
- Division of Light Industry and Environmental Engineering: 61 members
- Division of Agriculture: 84 members
- Division of Medicine and Health: 125 members
- Division of Engineering Management: 39 members

=== Criteria and Qualifications ===
The senior engineers, professors and other scholars or specialists, who shall have the Chinese citizenship (including those who reside in Taiwan, Hong Kong Special Administrative Region, Macao Special Administrative Region and overseas) and who have made significant and creative achievements and contributions in the fields of engineering and technological sciences, are qualified for the membership of the academy.

=== Elections of members ===
The election of new members (academicians) is conducted biennially. The total number of members to be elected in each election is decided by the governing body of the academy. Examinations and elections of the candidates are conducted in every Academy Division, and the voting is anonymous. The results of the voting are then examined and validated by the governing board.

== Publications ==
=== Engineering Sciences (journal) ===
ISSN Print 1009-1724

=== Engineering (journal) ===
ISSN Print 2095-8099

ISSN Online 2096-0026

== Collaborations ==
The Chinese Academy of Engineering has collaborated with other major academies (in policy development, engineering research projects, etc.), such as those from UK and USA:

- (United Kingdom) Royal Academy of Engineering
- (United States) National Academy of Engineering

== See also ==
- Chinese Academy of Sciences
- Scientific publishing in China
- Academician of Chinese Academy of Engineering
