= Alex Aster =

Colombian-American author (born 1995)

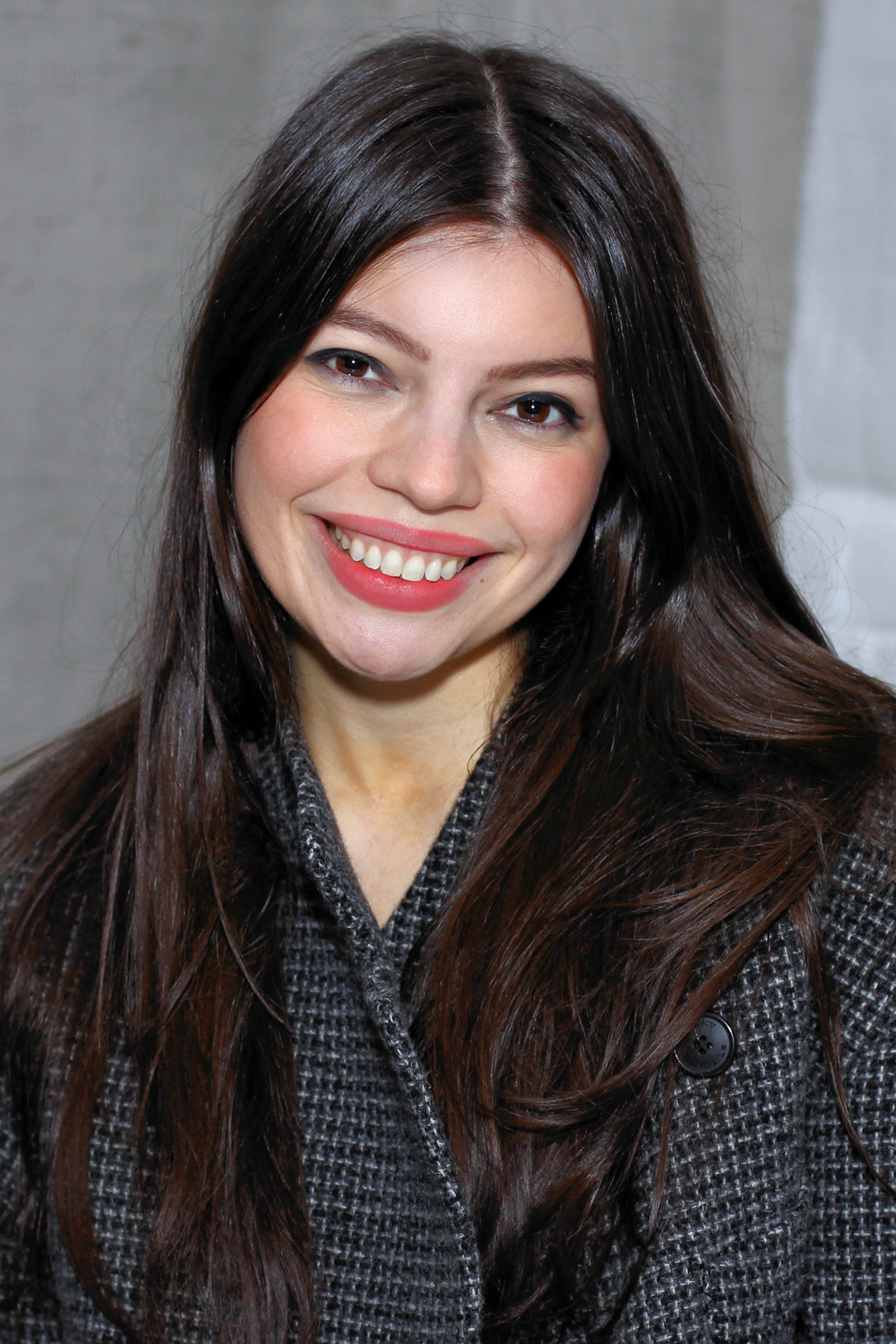
- Aster at the 2023 Texas Book Festival
- Born: Alexandra Pierson; August 4, 1995 (age 31)
- Education: University of Pennsylvania
- Occupation: Novelist
- Relatives: Daniella Pierson (sister)
- Writing career
- Language: English
- Period: 2020–present
- Genres: Fantasy, middle grade fiction, young adult fiction
- Notable work: Lightlark series
- Website: www.asterverse.com

Alexandra Pierson (born August 4, 1995), known professionally by her pen name Alex Aster, is a Colombian and American young adult author. She is best known for the young adult fantasy romance series Lightlark and the middle grade fantasy series Emblem Island.

== Early life ==
Pierson was born on August 4, 1995, to Keith and Claudy Pierson, alongside her twin sister, Daniella Pierson. Her parents are the co-owners of Keith Pierson Toyota in Jacksonville, Florida. Alex started writing books when she was thirteen, querying numerous publishers before landing a publishing deal shortly before her graduation from college. She graduated from the University of Pennsylvania in 2017.

== Career ==
Aster wrote six books before her first book deal. She published her first book, Curse of the Night Witch, in 2020, followed by its sequel in 2021. The series was inspired by her Colombian heritage and the stories her grandmother would tell her; however, the series did not receive the level of commercial success she had hoped for.

In the months before the release of her next book, Lightlark, she posted a TikTok promoting the story’s concept, which soon went viral and led to a publishing deal for the novel. The book received a first print run of 200,000 copies and sold over 24,000 copies in its first week, making it a New York Times best seller. The novel’s success further led to a movie deal with Universal Pictures and Temple Hill, with Aster executive producing.

Aster was named on the Forbes 30 Under 30 list in 2023.

Aster's adult debut, Summer in the City, released in March 2025. In its first week of release, the novel hit the New York Times Best Seller lists for print and ebook fiction and hardcover fiction.

== Works ==
Emblem Island series

- Curse of the Night Witch (June 9, 2020)
- Curse of the Forgotten City (June 8, 2021)

The Lightlark Saga

- Lightlark (August 23, 2022)
- Nightbane (November 7, 2023)
- Skyshade (November 12, 2024)
- Grim and Oro (September 30, 2025)
- Crowntide (December 2, 2025)
- Lightlark Holiday Novella

Starside series

- Starside (March 31, 2026)
- Stormside (April 20, 2027)

Standalones

- Summer in the City (March 25, 2025)
- Barbie: Dreamscape (28 July 2026)
