= Ron Clark Ball =

American novelist

- Born: July 24, 1959 (age 67)
- Occupation: Novelist
- Writing career
- Genres: Thriller, Spy fiction, Mystery

Ron Clark Ball (born July 24, 1959) is an American thriller and suspense novelist from McLean, Virginia, and the author of Falcon on the Tower (2007), ISBN 978-0-615-14016-2. He is also a former officer and Naval Aviator who flew the F-14 Tomcat and served in the United States Navy during Operation Desert Storm.

In addition to fiction, Ron Clark Ball has also written and lectured extensively on the increasing threat to National Security and damage to the Aerospace and Defense Industries by cyber attack using counterfeit and cloned electronic components and microchips manufactured in China.

In 2018, Ball was tried and convicted on four felony counts and sentenced to twenty years in prison for having defrauded a physician's widow, and others, in a securities investment scheme.
