= Kay Krill =

American business executive

Katherine "Kay" Krill is an American business executive who served as the president and chief executive officer of ANN INC., a wholly owned subsidiary of Ascena Retail Group from 2000 to 2015.

== Education ==
Krill received her B.A. in psychology and economics from Agnes Scott College in Atlanta, Georgia.

== Career ==
2015 marked Krill's tenth anniversary as CEO of ANN INC., a position she assumed eleven years after she joined the company. She was named President of ANN INC. and a member of the Board of Directors in 2004. During her tenure, Krill established ANN INC. as a financially successful company and helped evolve the Ann Taylor brand. Under Krill's leadership, the company launched another new brand, Lou & Grey, in 2014. In 2015, Krill transitioned from President and CEO of ANN INC. to Ascena's Board of Directors.

Krill joined ANN INC. in 1994 as Merchandising Vice President. She was subsequently promoted to Senior Vice President of Merchandising. One year after launching LOFT, Krill was named Executive Vice President, Merchandising and Design for LOFT; and in 2001, she became the President of the LOFT division. Prior to ANN INC., Krill served at Talbots and Mark Shale. She began her career at Macy's.

Under Krill, ANN INC. implemented a series of charitable and corporate social responsibility initiatives and partnerships as part of its broader mission to help women put their best selves forward every day. These initiatives and partnerships support women around the globe. Since 2005, the company has raised and donated more than $50 million to support causes important to women and children through the ANN Cares platform of charitable initiatives.

== Board memberships ==
In addition to her service on the ANN INC. and Ascena Boards, Krill has served on the board of the National Retail Federation, the world's largest retail trade association, since 2011. She is also a member of both the Breast Cancer Research Foundation Board of Directors and the Board of Trustees for St. Luke's School (New Canaan, CT).

== Awards ==
In 2013 The Breast Cancer Research Foundation awarded Krill the Sandra Taub Humanitarian Award, acknowledging that, under her guidance, ANN INC., has been one of the most committed and vocal supporters of BCRF. That same year, Krill was honored at the Fashion Institute of Technology's Annual Gala for her contributions to the fashion industry.

In 2012, Krill delivered remarks at her alma mater's 123rd Commencement, where she received an honorary doctorate degree.

Crain's has consistently recognized Krill as one of the "50 Most Powerful Women in New York" from 2007 through 2015.

== Personal life ==
A native of North Carolina, Krill currently resides in Connecticut with her twin sons.
