= Frances Anderson =

American art therapist and academic

Frances E. Anderson is an art therapist. She is a recipient of the Fulbright Senior Scholar Award.

== Early life ==
Frances E. Anderson's father was a preacher. She attended a prep school in her childhood. She stated in the book Architects of art therapy: Memoirs and life stories that her sole friend from childhood died in her eighth-grade year. She went on to study art therapy at college.

== Education ==
Anderson began her educational career at Agnes Scott College, a women's college, where she started out as an English major. She decided to change her major to art during her sophomore year. Watercolor, clay, and photography were her preferred media.

During this time, she also took several psychology courses. Upon doing research for one of her psychology papers, she discovered the Bulletin of Art Therapy, which led her to pursue a career in art therapy. In 1964, she transferred to Indiana University Bloomington where she simultaneously earned her master's degree and teaching certificate less than a year after graduating with her bachelor's degree.

After completing her undergraduate degree, Anderson began work as a teacher in a small schoolhouse for children with disabilities in Southern Indiana. This led to her interest in working with children with disabilities. In 1968 she returned to Indiana University Bloomington in 1968 to earn her doctorate in art education. Her doctoral research primarily focused on the use of art in mental hospitals.

Anderson was later diagnosed with a learning disability. She supplied dozens of adaptations and suggestions for teachers of children with any kind of disability in her text entitled, Art-centered Education and Therapy for Children with Disabilities.

After she graduated, Anderson continued publishing articles. It was then that her research began shifting focus to special populations and traumatized adults and children. She completed a major research study that incorporated a review of all the published research articles involving quantifiable data in art, music, dance, and drama for people with disabilities. Funded by the National Committee on Arts for the Handicapped, the goal of the study was to demonstrate the knowledge and quality of life that the arts bring to a person.

== Career, publications, and honors ==
Anderson attended the founding meeting of the American Art Therapy Association (AATA), in Louisville, Kentucky on June 29, 1969, upon graduating with her doctorate degree. When the AATA started the registration process of dividing its membership into regions, Anderson declined the title of research chair and instead became the first Midwest standards chair in 1972. Anderson set the expectations for research, stating that more research needed to be conducted to provide evidence for the effects and benefits of art therapy.

In 1972, Anderson conducted research with Helen Landgarten documenting the interest and need for art therapy in mental health facilities in the Midwest and Southern California. Anderson and Landgarten presented their findings in Columbus, Ohio at the fifth annual AATA Conference, and publications of the results were also included in the Bulletin of Art Therapy and Studies in Art Education.

In 1977, she took part in the seventh annual AATA conference, and sat on a panel titled Art therapy: An exploration of values. Here, she advocated for the immersion of art education. Anderson was able to continue to advocate and provide research for her field by serving on AATA's Education and Program Approval Board (EPAB).

Anderson's research helped aid the creation of a graduate training program at Illinois State University (ISU), in 1989. Anderson became the director of the program and worked to obtain grants that would be used for assistantships and tuition waivers. She assisted in the expansion of the program by seeking funding to support more art therapy educators, and by continuing research. Anderson recruited recognized doctorate-level art therapists such as Marcia Rosal, Doris Arrington, and Valeria Appleton among others, to teach weekend courses at ISU.

Anderson began volunteering in the lab school at ISU, where she worked as part of a treatment team for children with auditory, visual, physical, mental and emotional disabilities. She learned methods for working with children from her mentor, Larry Barnfield. Anderson also later assisted in the establishment of the art therapy graduate program at Florida State University.

Anderson wrote her first book: Art for All the Children: A Creative Sourcebook for the Impaired Child. In 1988, Anderson revised her first book and published Art for All the Children: Approaches to Art Therapy for Children with Disabilities.

In Anderson's third book, she wrote an additional chapter on “developing a sense of self through art”

When AATA established its first journal in 1982, Anderson became a member of the journal's committee. In 2000, Anderson became the editor for the journal. While working as editor, she was battling breast cancer, in which she survived.

Alongside Sandra Packard, she published an article titled "A Shared Identity Crisis: Art Education and Art Therapy?" that detailed the similarities and overlapping qualities of art therapy and art education.

At one point during her career, Anderson was approached by a former student and asked to work with a group of female survivors of childhood sexual abuse; a project that ended up being eight years of clinical work. Anderson had previously been affected by sexual harassment in the workplace.

While working with these groups of women, Anderson developed what she called "People Pots". With her first clay group, one of the directives (or art exercises) was to create a clay sculpture of a pet or animal. Anderson reflected on the experience as facing "the evils" and also adding the spiritual aspects to the process helped empower the women. As these groups were part of a grant project, Anderson documented the outcome with a journal article, four conference presentations, a monograph, and a video entitled Courage! Together We Heal.

== Awards ==
In April 2001, Anderson was recognized as the first art therapist to ever receive the Fulbright Senior Scholar Award (FSSA). In 2002, Anderson resigned as editor of the AATA journal, and retired from her post at ISU so that she could travel to teach a research course for four months in Buenos Aires. Here, she also collected data to add to her artistic development scale. In 2005, Anderson became the second art therapist to win the Fulbright Specialist Grant, which allowed her to travel to Taiwan, Thailand, and Pakistan, and eventually play a role in establishing the first Taiwan art therapy program.

Florida State University offers the Frances E. Anderson Scholarship which offers financial support to art therapy graduate students.

Anderson is active in CHART and AATA.

== Books ==
- Art for All the Children: A Creative Sourcebook for the Impaired Child
- Art for All the Children: Approaches to Art Therapy for Children with Disabilities
- Art-centered Education and Therapy for Children with Disabilities
- Art for the Handicapped
- A Review of the Published Literature on Arts and the Handicapped, 1971-1981
