= Duke Kunshan University =

Joint venture university in Kunshan, China

Coordinates: 31°25′3.67″N 120°53′35.96″E

- 昆山杜克大学
- Type: Sino-foreign cooperative university
- Established: 2013; 13 years ago
- Parent institution: Duke University; Wuhan University
- Affiliations: AALAU
- Chancellor: Liu Yaolin
- Executive Vice Chancellor: John Quelch
- Location: Kunshan, Jiangsu, China
- Campus: Suburban/Urban, 200 acres (0.81 km^{2})
- Mascot: Trailblazers (Duke blue Deer)
- Website: dukekunshan.edu.cn

Chinese name
- Simplified Chinese: 昆山杜克大学
- Traditional Chinese: 崑山杜克大學
Transcriptions
Standard Mandarin
- Hanyu Pinyin: Kūnshān Dùkè Dàxué

Duke Kunshan University (DKU; 昆山杜克大学) is a Sino-foreign cooperative university in Kunshan, Jiangsu, China. It was established in 2013 by Duke University and Wuhan University. Upon graduation, undergraduate students receive degrees from both Duke University and Duke Kunshan University.

Duke Kunshan offers a four-year, fully residential undergraduate program, along with two masters programs in conjunction with Duke University. The university has 2,080 enrolled students as of Spring 2026, consisting of 1,530 domestic students and 550 international students.

== Timeline ==
- Jan. 2010 – A Cooperation Agreement signed between Duke University and the People's Government of Kunshan
- Sep. 2010 – Construction of Phase 1 campus started
- Jan. 2011 – Cooperation Principles Statement signed between Duke University and Wuhan University
- Jun. 2011 – Application for Preparation Approval of Duke Kunshan University submitted to Jiangsu Provincial Bureau of Education
- Aug. 2012 – Preparation Approval from China's Ministry of Education
- Sep. 2012 – Appointments of Duke Kunshan Chancellor and Executive Vice Chancellor
- Dec. 2012 – Celebration Ceremony of Preparation Approval in Kunshan
- Apr. 2013 – Application for formal establishment of Duke Kunshan University submitted to Jiangsu Provincial Bureau of Education
- Sep. 2013 – Duke Kunshan Establishment Approval granted by China's Ministry of Education
- Nov. 2013 – First meeting of Duke Kunshan Board of Trustees held at Wuhan University
- Dec. 2013 – Duke Kunshan legal entity registration completed
- Jan. 2014 – Duke Kunshan Advisory Board established
- May 2014 – First meeting of Duke Kunshan Advisory Board held in Beijing
- Jul. 2014 – Duke Kunshan Master of Management program began in Durham
- Aug. 2018 – Inaugural undergraduate program begins
- Jan. 2020 – COVID-19 forces international students off campus, DKU switches to hybrid classes
- Aug. 2020 – First group of DKU undergraduates begin study abroad at Duke's main campus.
- May 2022 – Inaugural undergraduate of 2022 graduates in hybrid ceremony at Duke and DKU's campuses
- July 2023 – Creation of university mascot called the “Trailblazers” which is a Duke blue-colored deer

== Academics ==
=== Admissions ===
Duke Kunshan University admitted its first undergraduate students as part of the Class of 2022. Significantly exceeding its original target of 1,500 applicants, the university received a total of 3,143 applications for an estimated 225 first-year spots, including 2,551 applications from China and 332 from the United States. There were 80 countries represented in the applicant pool, including Kazakhstan, South Korea, Pakistan, and Ethiopia.

In March 2025, DKU admitted 550 students from a pool of 11,884 total applicants, making the acceptance rate about 5%, a selectivity similar to the 4.8% acceptance rate at Duke University. Of those applications, 165 international students were chosen from a pool of 5,882, and 385 Chinese students from a pool of 6,002. For the Class of 2029, DKU received an unprecedented number of international applications, making this cycle the most rigorous.

All undergraduate applications for Duke Kunshan are submitted using the Common Application. Students applying to Duke University can also check a box on the Duke application to apply for admission to Duke Kunshan University. International students, including those from the United States, typically submit transcripts, SAT or ACT standardized test scores, and application essays. However, a test-optional policy was in effect for applications submitted in 2020 and 2021.

Students can apply separately to each of DKU's five graduate programs.

== Study Away ==
All students spend a semester in their junior year studying away, for which the most popular choice is at Duke University in Durham, NC. An additional summer of study away is also possible.

=== Controversies ===
A 2017 article in the Financial Times stated that although Duke Kunshan University had signed legally binding agreements with the Education Ministry of China that guaranteed academic freedom on campus, many academics had doubts that the agreements would be upheld.

== Campus ==
Panorama of Phase I of the "Water Feature", which separates the Academic Building (L), Conference Center (R) and Innovation Center (background)

Duke Kunshan is located in a 200-acre campus in Kunshan, a city in southeastern Jiangsu province. The campus will become the center of the Duke Creative Park, part of the city's "Five Zones, One Line" plan for urban renewal. The area will host the Sino-US (Kunshan) Technology Innovation Center and serve as a mixed-used project integrating R&D centers, business services, and ecological parks.

Kunshan's location between Shanghai and Suzhou allows easy access to these major metropolitan centers by highways and high-speed railway.

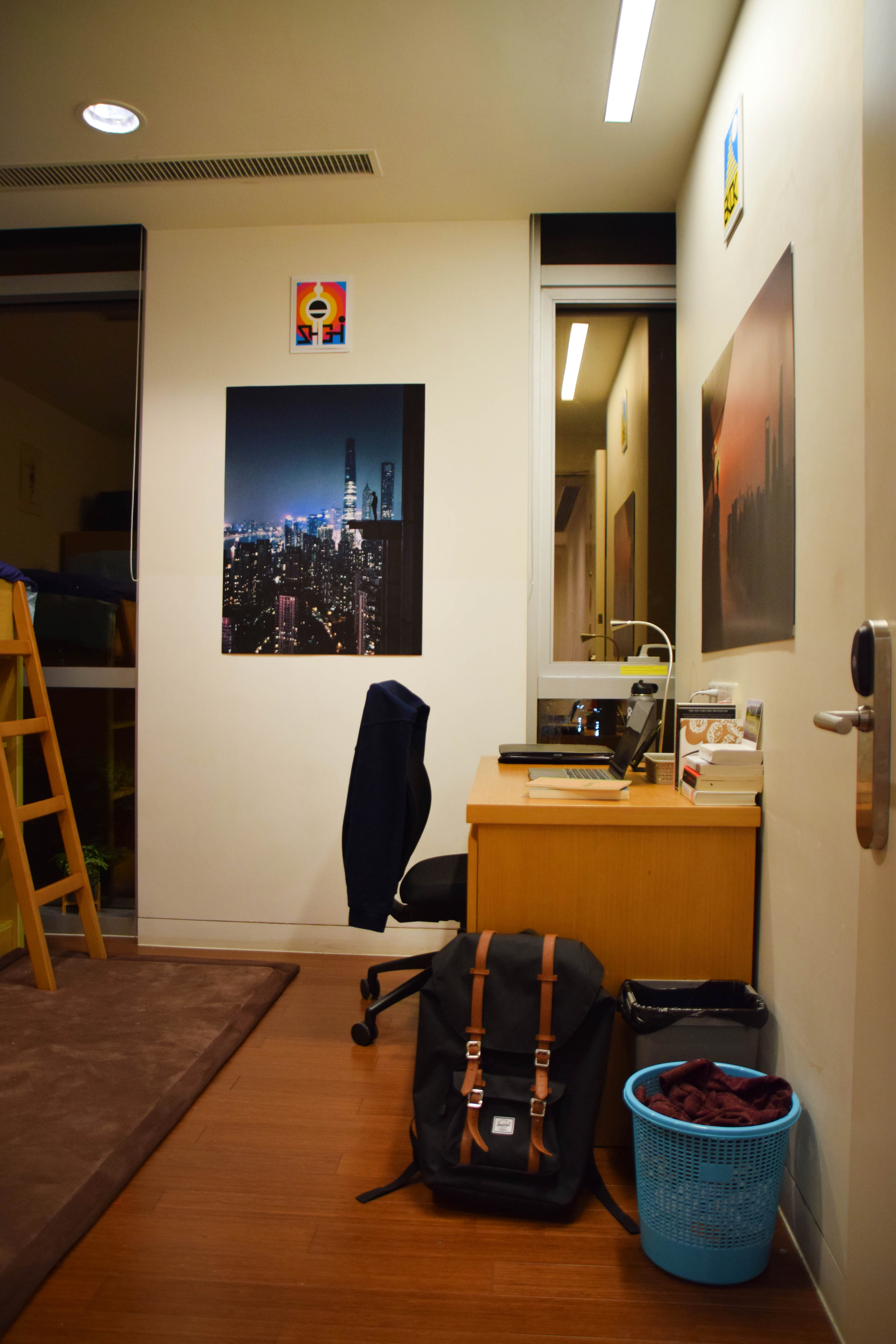
A single dorm room within a four-person student residence hall suite

The campus is being constructed in phases, with Phase I designed by American design and architecture firm Gensler. Phase 1 facilities include an academic building with a variety of classroom configurations, a 200-bed dormitory building, a conference center and hotel, a faculty residence, and an administration building. An innovation center equipped with a library, classrooms and team rooms was opened in 2019.

Phase 2 was completed in 2023. Designed by Perkins and Will, Phase 2 features an expansion of undergraduate, graduate, and faculty housing, a community center, recreation center, the WD Research Institute, and a library. The 71.3 acre Duke Kunshan Gardens are also currently under construction, and are scheduled for completion in 2023. The construction was completed in 2024 and doubled the size of the campus.

Later plans call for Phase III and IV construction to take place in the coming decade.

As part of the partnership between Duke University, Wuhan University, and the city of Kunshan, the municipal government has leased the Duke Kunshan University campus to the university at no cost for the first ten years as well as paying for construction of the buildings.

== See also ==
- Duke University
- Wuhan University
