= Wuhan University =

Public university in Wuhan, Hubei, China

Coordinates: 30°32′27″N 114°21′40″E

- 武汉大学
- Motto: 自强 弘毅 求是 拓新
- Motto in English: Self-improvement, Perseverance, Truth-seeking, Innovation
- Type: Public
- Established: Incorporated as a university in 1926
- President: Zhang Pingwen
- Faculty: 7,325
- Students: 58,720
- Location: Wuhan, Hubei, China
- Campus: Urban, 3.5 km^{2}
- Website: en.whu.edu.cn

Chinese name
- Simplified Chinese: 武汉大学
- Traditional Chinese: 武漢大學
Transcriptions
Standard Mandarin
- Hanyu Pinyin: Wǔhàn Dàxué

Wuhan University (WHU) is a public university in Wuhan, Hubei, China. It is administered and funded by the Ministry of Education of China. The university is part of Project 985, Project 211, and Double First-Class Construction.

== History ==
In 1926, National Wuchang University, National Wuchang University of Commerce, Hubei Provincial Medical University, Hubei Provincial University of Legislation, Hubei Provincial University of Liberal Arts, and the private Wuchang Zhonghua University were merged into National Wuchang Sun Yat-sen University (also known as National Second Sun Yat-sen University).

The school had an undergraduate department and 6 subjects including liberal arts, science, law, economics, medicine, and preparatory courses, 17 departments, and 2 institutes.

In 1928, the Nanjing National Government officially established the National Wuhan University based on the former National Wuchang Sun Yat-sen University, with four colleges: liberal arts, law, science, and engineering.

In 1949, National Wuhan University was taken over by the Communist Party and renamed Wuhan University.

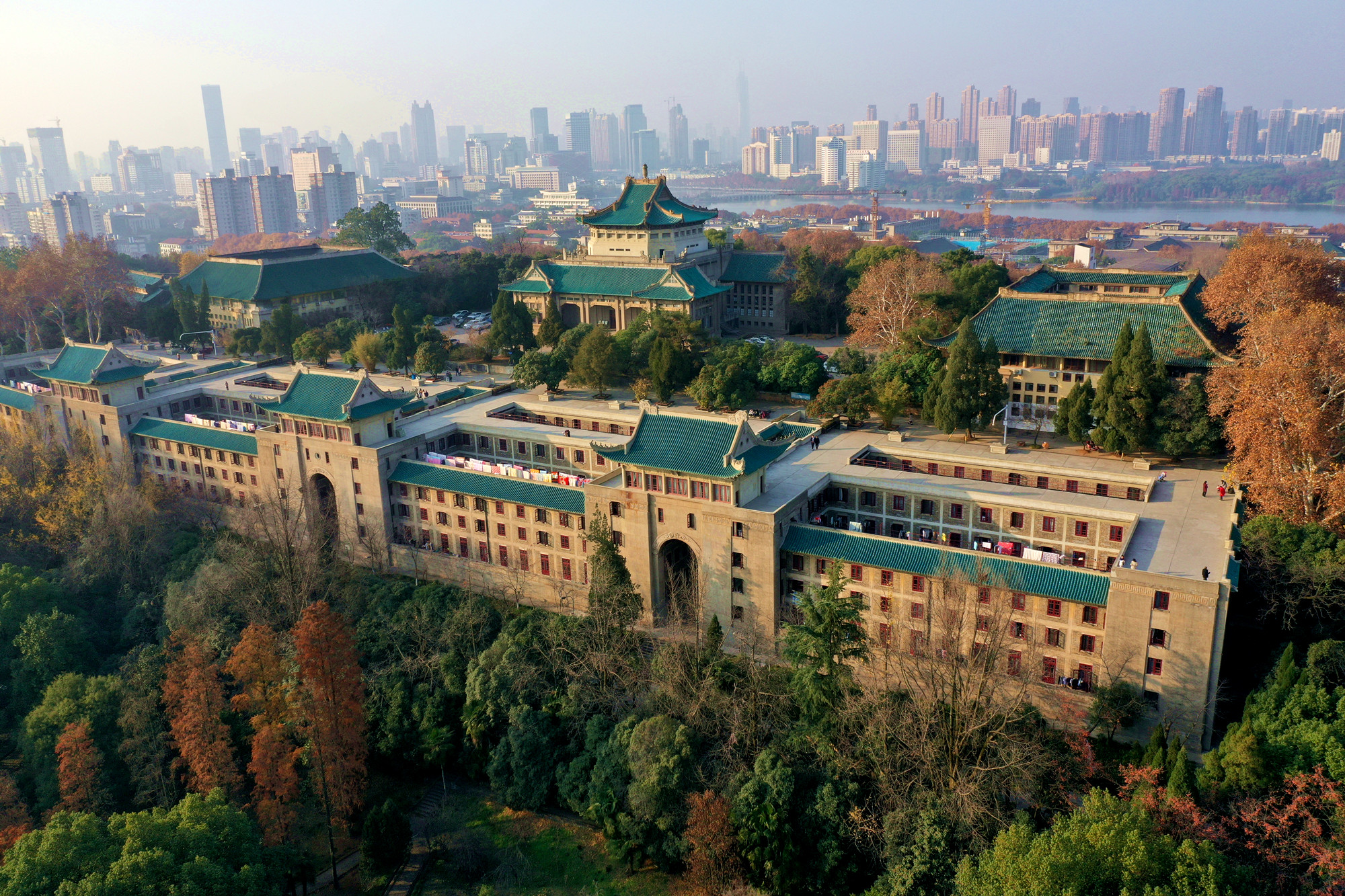
Former library situated on top of the old dorms, as depicted in the university's logo.

The School of Information Management at Wuhan University signed a cooperation agreement with the Royal School of Library and Information Science in Denmark in 2009.

Wuhan University collaborated with Duke University in the United States and the city of Kunshan to establish Duke Kunshan University in 2013. The first undergraduates were admitted in 2018, and the agreement between Wuhan and Duke is due to expire in 2028. In May 2025, Chairmen of two U.S. House of Representatives Committees urged Duke to withdraw from the partnership, citing national security concerns.

In 2025, Wuhan University revoked a disciplinary demerit imposed on a student following a widely discussed sexual-harassment allegation in the university library, after court rulings and an internal review. See Wuhan University Library controversy.

In 2026, Wuhan University established a joint institute with Durham University in the UK as its first Sino-foreign joint institute within the university rather than as an independent legal entity. The institute offers four-year undergraduate courses leading to a double degree awarded by both universities.

== Campus ==
Most of the university's early stylish buildings were designed by F. H. Kales (1899–1979).

In 1939, during the Second Sino-Japanese War, the Japanese army planted the first batch of cherry trees on the Wuhan University campus to relieve the homesickness of its troops. These trees were preserved after the war ended, despite their historical association with the Japanese occupation.

In 1972, to mark the normalisation of China–Japan relations, another batch of cherry trees was offered to Premier Zhou Enlai, who gave 20 trees to WHU. The WHU website describes subsequent donations in 1983 by biology professor Wang Mingquan, who studied in Kyoto, and by a Japanese delegation in 1992.

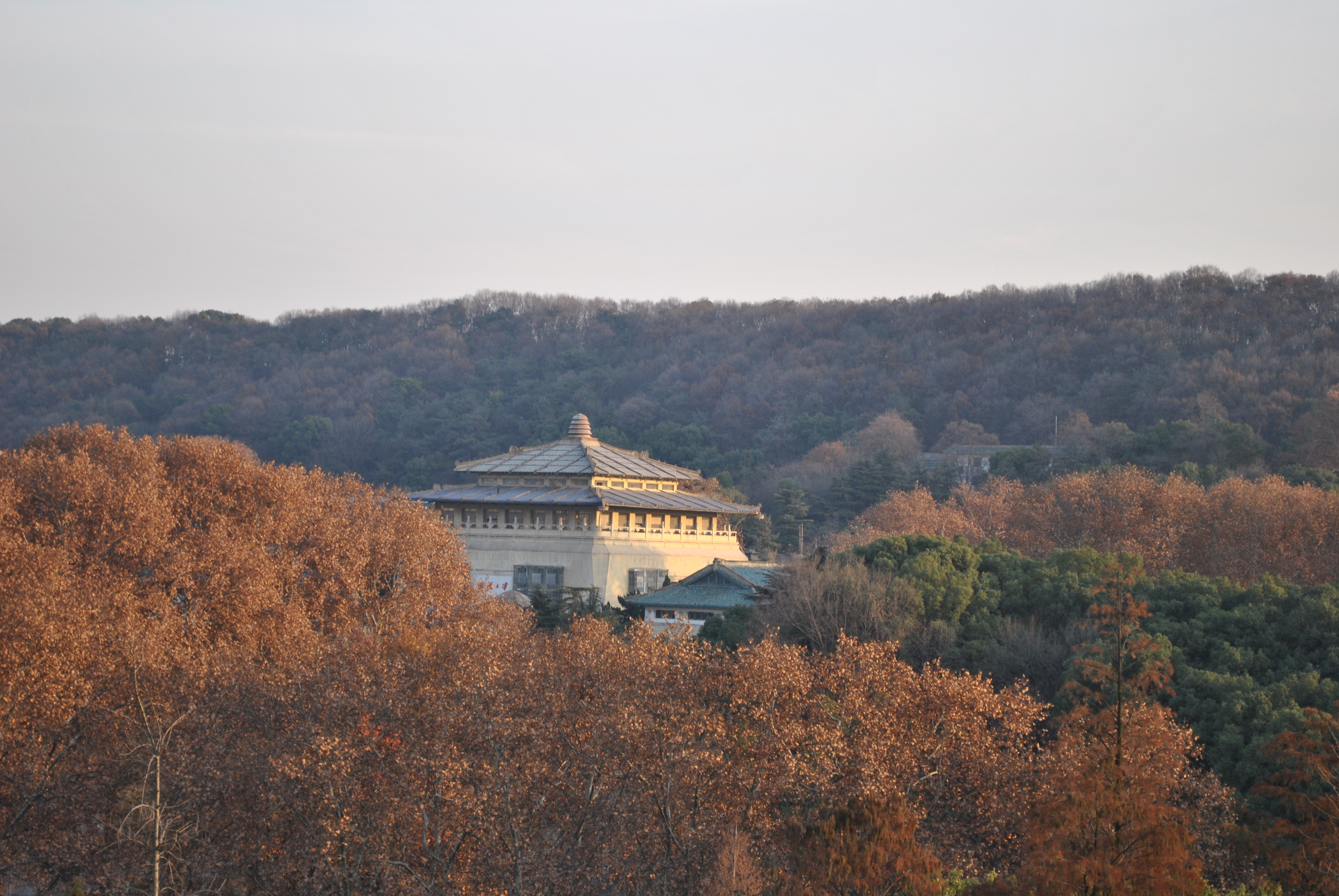
Luojia Hill (Luojiashan)

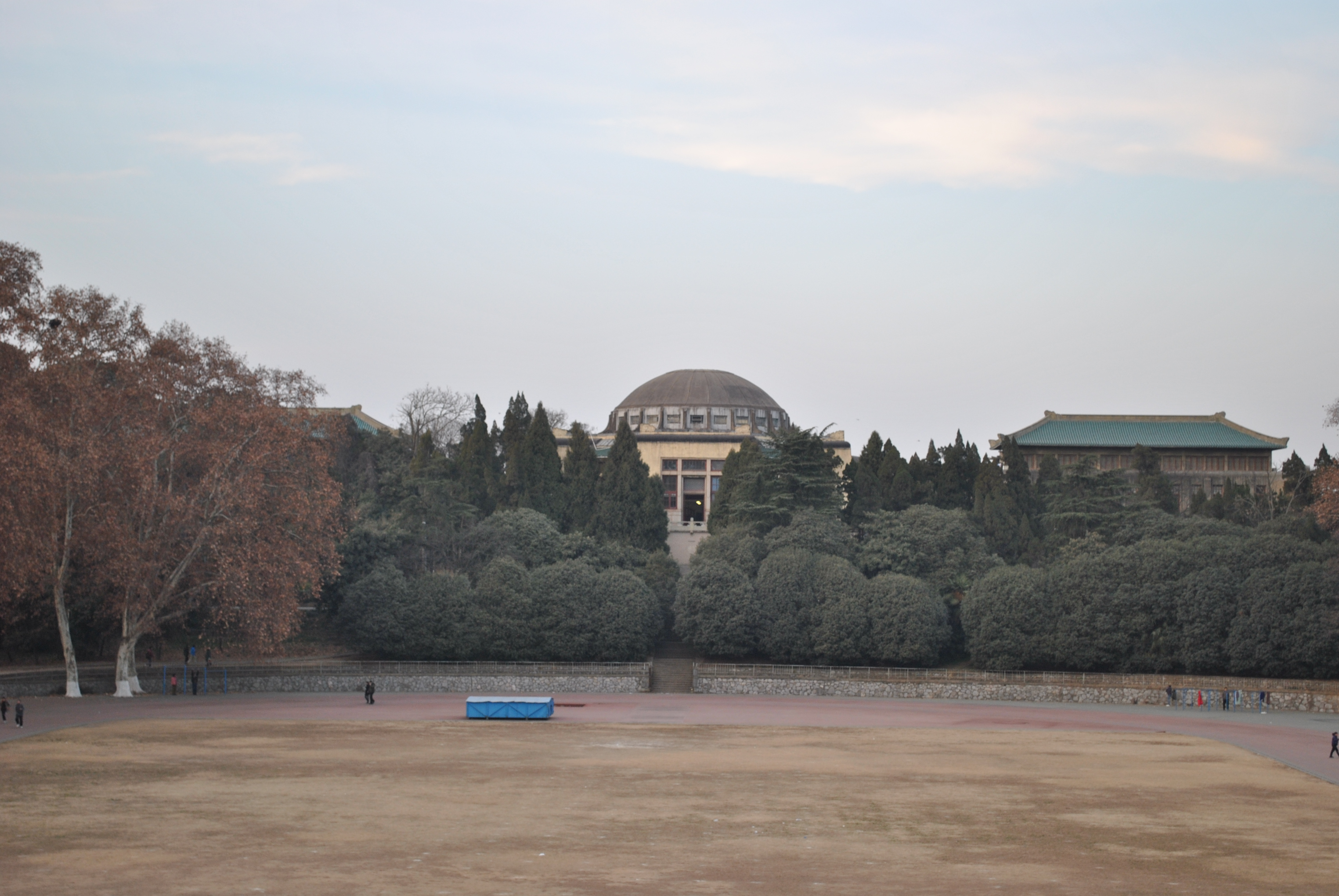
Former School of Science

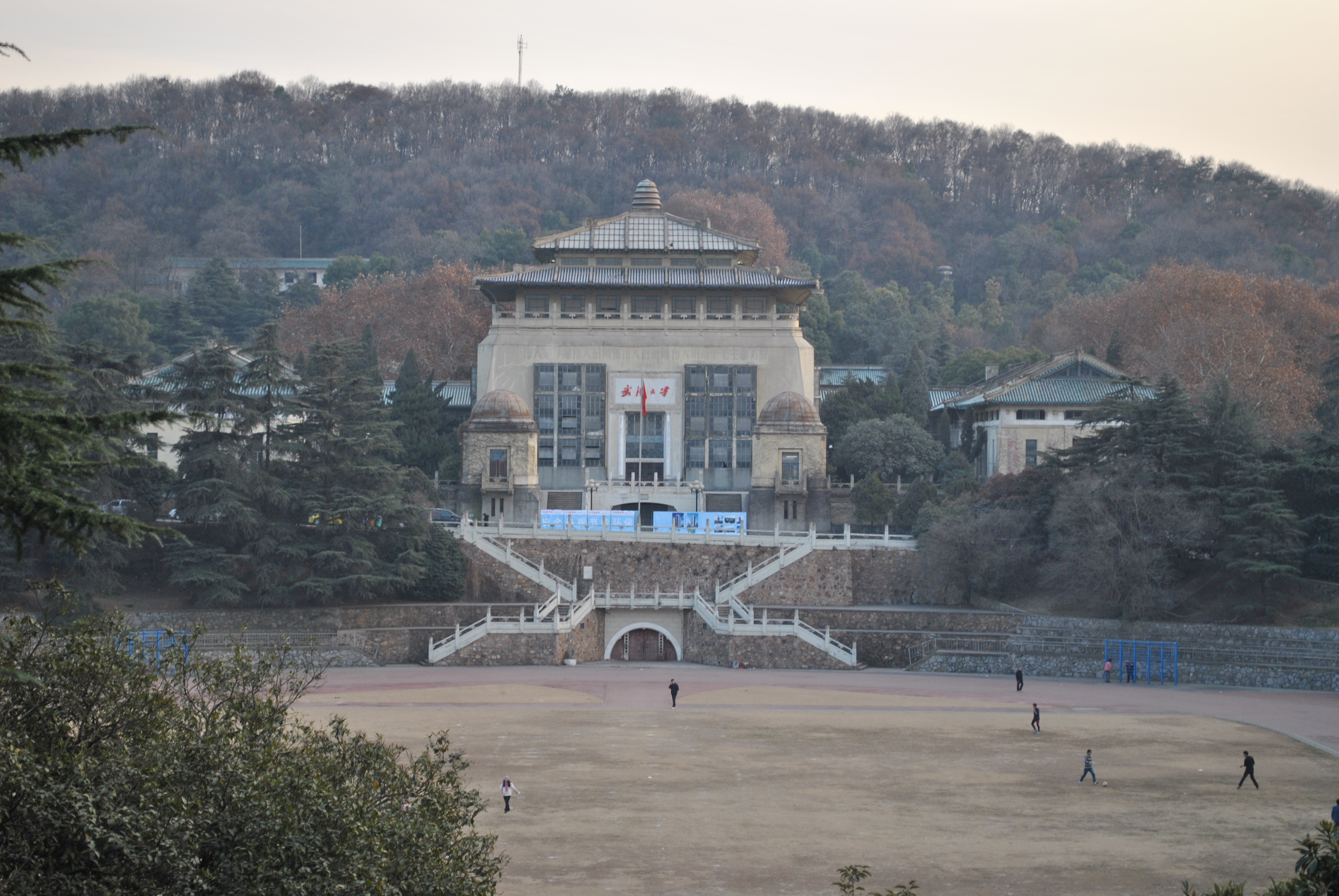
Administration Building, Former School of Engineering

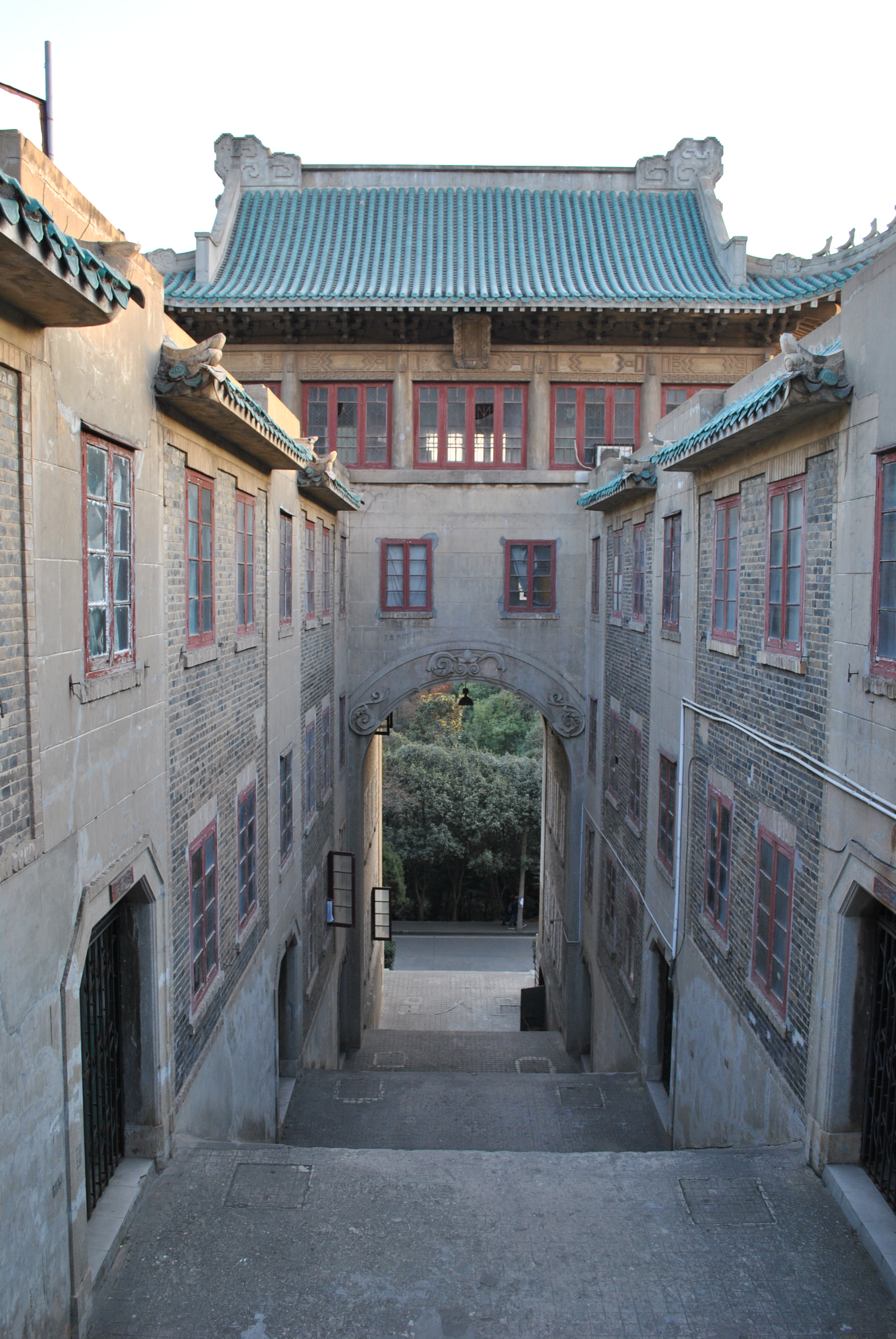
Former Dorm for male students

== Academics ==
In 2024, Wuhan University's student body consisted of 29,488 full-time undergraduates and 24,126 full-time master's degree candidates, more than 10,000 doctoral candidates, and 3,007 international students. The university had 3,940 faculty staff at the time.

=== Reputation and rankings ===
University rankings
BCUR National	Domestic	8
Wu Shulian National	Domestic	6
CUAA National	Alumni	10
QS National	General	9
THE National	General	8
QS Asia (Asia version)	General	38
THE Asia (Asia version)	General	24
ARWU World	Research	77
QS World	General	165
THE World	General	=122
USNWR World	General	85

From 2026 to 2027, U.S. News & World Report ranked it 85th in the world, 18th in Asia and 10th in China.

In 2026, Academic Ranking of World Universities ranked it 77th in the world, 15th in Asia and 11th in Greater China (including Mainland China, Hong Kong, Macau and Taiwan).

In 2025, Times Higher Education World University Rankings ranked it 122th in the world and 8th in China.

In 2026, QS World University Rankings ranked it 165th in the world and 9th in China.

The Nature Index 2026 ranked Wuhan University the 15th university in the Asia-Pacific region, and 18th in the world. The 2025 CWTS Leiden Ranking ranked Wuhan University 16th in the world by total publications and 31st in the world based on the number of their scientific publications belonging to the top 1% in their fields for the time period 2020–2023.

As of 2017, 29 billionaires had graduated from Wuhan University, placing the university 9th nationally.

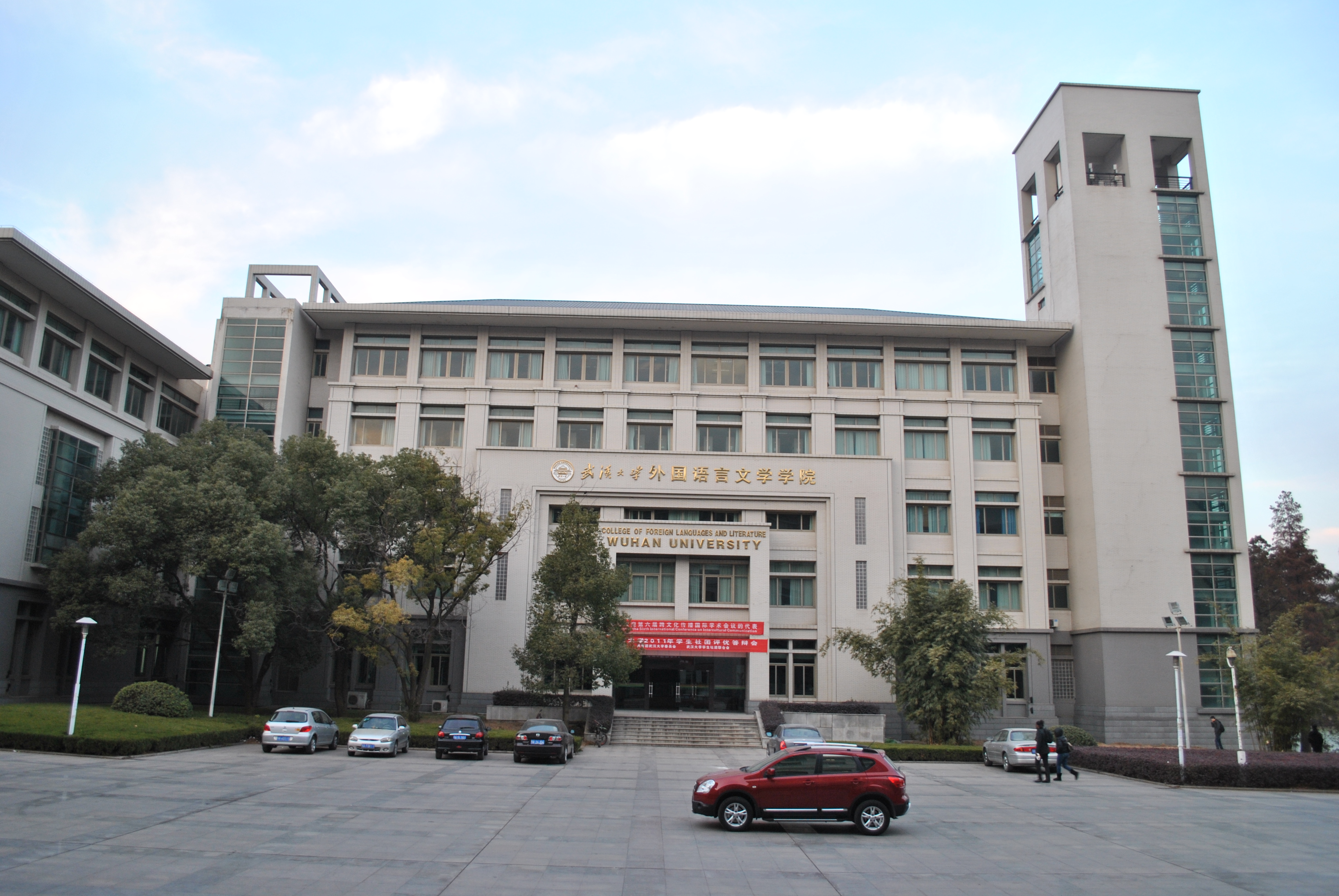
College of Foreign Languages and Literatures
