= State Key Laboratory =

List of research institution laboratories in China

State Key Laboratory (SKL; 国家重点实验室) is a national designation awarded to university- and enterprise-owned research institutions and laboratories that receive special funding from the Ministry of Science and Technology of China.

These labs often specialize in areas such as: Chemistry, Mathematics and Physics, Geology, Biotechnology, Information technology, Materials science, Engineering, and Medicine.

== List of designated laboratories ==
According to the Ministry of Science and Technology of China, as of 2023, there were 533 State Key Laboratories approved in China.

The following lists the 73 universities in mainland China, Hong Kong and Macau with at least one state key laboratory:

The Universities with State Key Laboratories
Rank	Entity	SKL Number
1	Tsinghua University (清华大学)	10
1	Zhejiang University (浙江大学)	10
3	Peking University (北京大学)	8
4	Nanjing University (南京大学)	7
5	Shanghai Jiao Tong University (上海交通大学)	6
6	Fudan University (复旦大学)	5
6	Jilin University (吉林大学)	5
6	University of Hong Kong (香港大學)	5
6	Xian Jiaotong University (西安交通大学)	5
10	Beijing Normal University (北京师范大学)	4
10	Chinese University of Hong Kong (香港中文大學)	4
10	Dalian University of Technology (大连理工大学)	4
10	Huazhong University of Science and Technology (华中科技大学)	4
10	Sichuan University (四川大学)	4
10	Sun Yat-sen University (中山大学)	4
10	Tianjin University (天津大学)	4
10	Wuhan University (武汉大学)	4
18	Chongqing University (重庆大学)	3
18	China Agricultural University (中国农业大学)	3
18	Harbin Institute of Technology (哈尔滨工业大学)	3
18	South China University of Technology (华南理工大学)	3
18	Southeast University (东南大学)	3
18	Tongji University (同济大学)	3
18	University of Macau (澳门大学)	3
18	Xiamen University (厦门大学)	3
26	Beihang University (北京航空航天大学)	2
26	Beijing University of Chemical Technology (北京化工大学)	2
26	Beijing University of Posts and Telecommunications (北京邮电大学)	2
26	Beijing University of Science and Technology (北京科技大学)	2
26	Central South University (中南大学)	2
26	Chengdu University of Technology (成都理工大学)	2
26	China University of Geosciences (中国地质大学（武汉）)	2
26	China University of Mining and Technology (中国矿业大学)	2
26	China University of Mining and Technology - Beijing (中国矿业大学（北京）)	2
26	China University of Petroleum (中国石油大学（北京）)	2
26	City University of Hong Kong (香港城市大學)	2
26	East China Normal University (华东师范大学)	2
26	East China University of Science and Technology (华东理工大学)	2
26	Hong Kong Polytechnic University (香港理工大學)	2
26	Hong Kong University of Science and Technology (香港科技大學)	2
26	Huazhong Agricultural University (华中农业大学)	2
26	Hunan University (湖南大学)	2
26	Lanzhou University (兰州大学)	2
26	Macau University of Science and Technology (澳门科技大学)	2
26	Nankai University (南开大学)	2
26	Northeastern University (东北大学)	2
26	Shandong University (山东大学)	2
26	University of Science and Technology of China (中国科学技术大学)	2
26	Wuhan University of Technology (武汉理工大学)	2
50	China University of Geosciences (Beijing) (中国地质大学（北京）)	1
50	China University of Petroleum (Huadong) (中国石油大学（华东）)	1
50	Donghua University (东华大学)	1
50	Guangxi University (广西大学)	1
50	Guangzhou Medical University (广州医科大学)	1
50	Henan University (河南大学)	1
50	Hohai University (河海大学)	1
50	Hong Kong Baptist University (香港浸會大學)	1
50	Jiangnan University (江南大学)	1
50	Shandong Agricultural University (山东农业大学)	1
50	Shanxi University (山西大学)	1
50	South China Agricultural University (华南农业大学)	1
50	Southwest Petroleum University (西南石油大学)	1
50	Southwest University (西南大学)	1
50	Nanchang University (南昌大学)	1
50	Nanjing Agricultural University (南京农业大学)	1
50	Nanjing Tech University (南京工业大学)	1
50	Nanjing University of Aeronautics and Astronautics (南京航空航天大学)	1
50	North China Electric Power University (华北电力大学)	1
50	Northeast Forestry University (东北林业大学)	1
50	Northwestern Polytechnical University (西北工业大学)	1
50	University of Electronic Science and Technology of China (电子科技大学)	1
50	Xidian University (西安电子科技大学)	1
50	Yanshan University (燕山大学)	1
Total: 73 universities (mainland China, Hong Kong and Macau)

Most of the universities with SKL in mainland China are Double First Class Universities, approved by the central government of the People's Republic of China.

== See also ==
- List of universities in China
- Double First Class University Plan
- National Key Universities (China)
- OpenCourseWare in China
- China Open Resources for Education
