= Project 211 =

Former Chinese higher education development scheme, 1994-2014

- 211工程
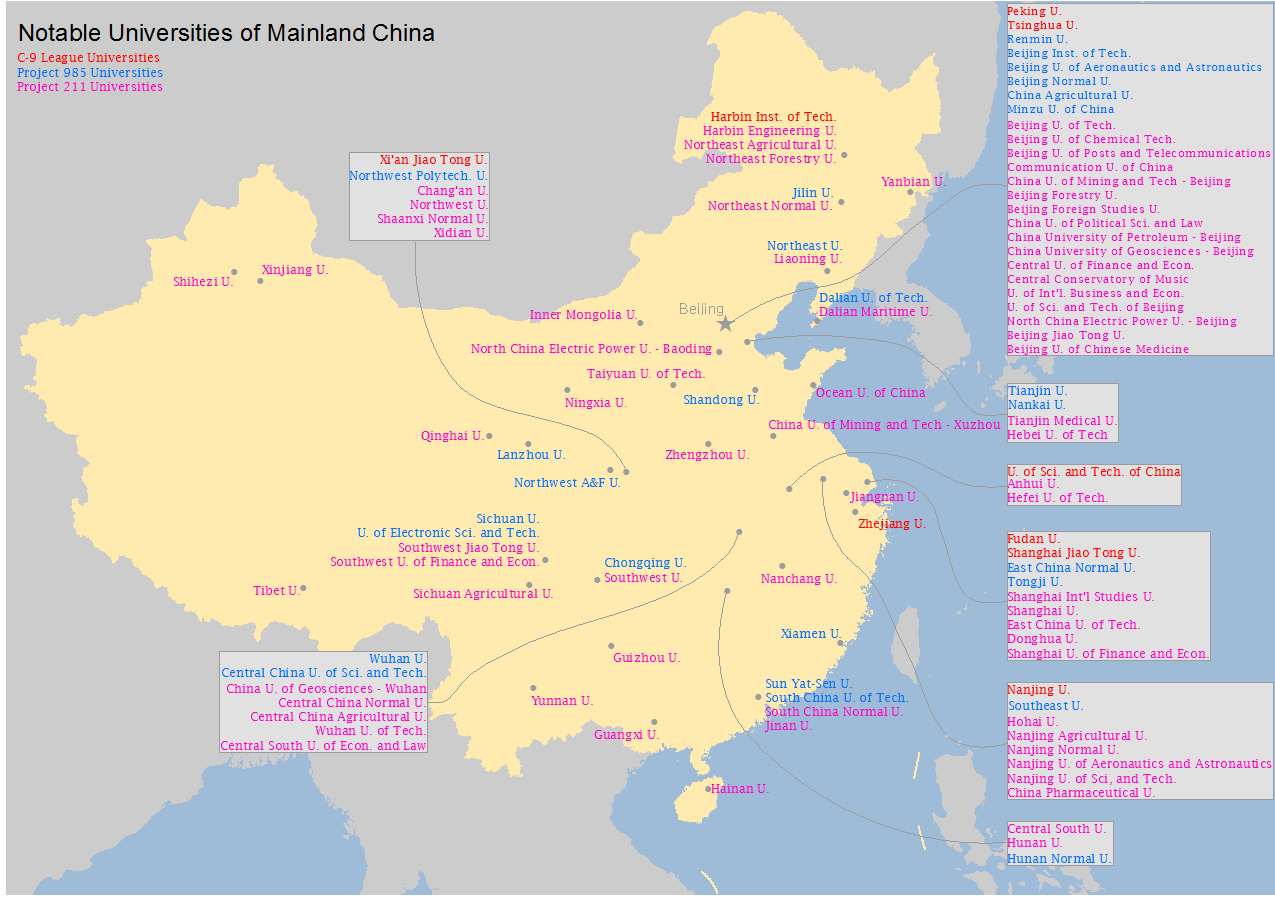
- Map of universities of Project 211 in China
- Predecessor: National Key Universities
- Successor: Double First-Class Construction
- Formation: 1995; 31 years ago
- Defunct: 2014; 12 years ago
- Region served: China
- Members: 115 public universities nationwide

Project 211 (Chinese: 211工程) was a higher education development and sponsorship scheme of the government of China for "preparing approximately 100 universities for the 21st century", initiated in November 1995. There were 115 universities and colleges selected to be part of this program.

Project 211 and Project 985 were both initiated by CCP general secretary Jiang Zemin in 1990s as part of the "revitalize the country through science and education" strategy. They were nullified and replaced by the Double First-Class Construction in 2015, under the Xi Jinping administration.

== Etymology ==
Project 211 was a project of developing comprehensive universities and colleges initiated in 1995 by the then National Education Commission of China, with the intent of raising the research standards of comprehensive universities and cultivating strategies for socio-economic development.

The name for the project comes from an abbreviation of the slogan "In preparation for the 21st century, successfully running 100 higher education institutions" (面向21世纪，办好100所高校). One hundred was the approximate number of participating universities.

== History ==
In November 1995, with the approval of the State Council, the then State Planning Commission, the then State Education Commission, and the Ministry of Finance jointly issued the "Project 211 Overall Construction Plan" document. This document officially started Project 211. A total of 15 universities were selected as the first batch of institutions included in the "211 Project" in 1995.

In December 1996, the first batch was expanded by 80 institutions, bringing the total number in Phase One to 95.

In 2005, the second batch of 12 universities was added into the project's Phase Two. At the end of 2005, the third batch added one more university.

In 2008, the fourth batch added five universities in Phase Three.

In October 2015, the State Council of China published the "Overall Plan for Promoting the Construction of World First Class Universities and First Class Disciplines" (Double First-Class Construction), which made new arrangements for the development of higher education in China, replacing previous higher education projects.

On June 7, 2016, the Ministry of Education of China under CCP general secretary Xi Jinping nullified the two projects by invalidating the fundamental documents "Measures for the Implementation and Management of Project 211 Construction" and "Opinions on the Continued Implementation of Project 985 Construction Projects."

On June 27, 2016, the Ministry of Education said in response to The Beijing News reporters' questions that the two projects faced the issues such as lack of competition, redundant overlaps, and uneven distribution of resources. The ministry believed there was a need to amend the plan and strengthen the integration of resources.

== List of Project-211 universities and colleges ==
By 2008, China had some 116 public universities and colleges selected as part of Project 211.

- Beijing (26)
  - Beijing Foreign Studies University
  - Beijing Forestry University
  - Beijing Institute of Technology
  - Beijing Jiaotong University
  - Beijing Normal University
  - Beihang University
  - Beijing University of Chemical Technology
  - Beijing University of Chinese Medicine
  - Beijing University of Posts and Telecommunications
  - Beijing University of Technology
  - Central Conservatory of Music
  - Central University of Finance and Economics
  - China Agricultural University
  - China University of Geosciences (Beijing)
  - China University of Petroleum (Beijing)
  - China University of Mining and Technology (Beijing)
  - China University of Political Science and Law
  - Communication University of China
  - Minzu University of China
  - North China Electric Power University
  - Peking Union Medical College
  - Peking University
  - Renmin University of China
  - Tsinghua University
  - University of International Business and Economics
  - University of Science and Technology Beijing
- Jiangsu (11)
  - Nanjing (8)
    - China Pharmaceutical University
    - Hohai University
    - Nanjing Aeronautics and Astronautics University
    - Nanjing Agricultural University
    - Nanjing Normal University
    - Nanjing University
    - Nanjing University of Science and Technology
    - Southeast University
  - Suzhou
    - Soochow University
  - Wuxi
    - Jiangnan University
  - Xuzhou
    - China University of Mining and Technology
- Shanghai (10)
  - Donghua University
  - East China Normal University
  - East China University of Science and Technology
  - Fudan University
  - Second Military Medical University
  - Shanghai International Studies University
  - Shanghai Jiao Tong University
  - Shanghai University
  - Shanghai University of Finance and Economics
  - Tongji University
- Shaanxi (8)
  - Xi'an (7)
    - Chang'an University
    - Fourth Military Medical University
    - Xi'an Jiaotong University
    - Xidian University
    - Shaanxi Normal University
    - Northwest University
    - Northwestern Polytechnical University
  - Xianyang
    - Northwest A&F University
- Wuhan, Hubei (7)
  - China University of Geosciences (Wuhan)
  - Wuhan University
  - Huazhong University of Science and Technology
  - Wuhan University of Technology
  - Huazhong Agricultural University
  - Central China Normal University
  - Zhongnan University of Economics and Law
- Sichuan (5)
  - Chengdu (4)
    - Sichuan University
    - Southwest Jiaotong University
    - Southwestern University of Finance and Economics
    - University of Electronic Science and Technology of China
  - Ya'an
    - Sichuan Agricultural University
- Guangzhou, Guangdong (4)
  - Jinan University
  - South China Normal University
  - South China University of Technology
  - Sun Yat-sen University
- Changsha, Hunan (4)
  - Central South University
  - Hunan Normal University
  - Hunan University
  - National University of Defense Technology
- Harbin, Heilongjiang (4)
  - Harbin Engineering University
  - Harbin Institute of Technology
  - Northeast Agricultural University
  - Northeast Forestry University
- Liaoning (4)
  - Shenyang (2)
    - Liaoning University
    - Northeastern University
  - Dalian (2)
    - Dalian Maritime University
    - Dalian University of Technology
- Tianjin (4)
  - Hebei University of Technology
  - Nankai University
  - Tianjin Medical University
  - Tianjin University
- Hefei, Anhui (3)
  - Anhui University
  - Hefei University of Technology
  - University of Science and Technology of China
- Jilin (3)
  - Changchun (2)
    - Jilin University
    - Northeast Normal University
  - Yanji
    - Yanbian University
- Shandong (3)
  - Qingdao (2)
    - Ocean University of China
    - China University of Petroleum (Huadong)
  - Jinan
    - Shandong University
- Chongqing (2)
  - Chongqing University
  - Southwest University
- Fujian (2)
  - Xiamen
    - Xiamen University
  - Fuzhou
    - Fuzhou University
- Xinjiang (2)
  - Shihezi
    - Shihezi University
  - Ürümqi
    - Xinjiang University
- Guiyang, Guizhou
  - Guizhou University
- Lanzhou, Gansu
  - Lanzhou University
- Haikou, Hainan
  - Hainan University
- Zhengzhou, Henan
  - Zhengzhou University
- Nanchang, Jiangxi
  - Nanchang University
- Xining, Qinghai
  - Qinghai University
- Taiyuan, Shanxi
  - Taiyuan University of Technology
- Kunming, Yunnan
  - Yunnan University
- Hangzhou, Zhejiang
  - Zhejiang University
  - Hangzhou University
- Nanning, Guangxi
  - Guangxi University
- Hohhot, Inner Mongolia
  - Inner Mongolia University
- Yinchuan, Ningxia
  - Ningxia University
- Lhasa, Tibet
  - Tibet University

== See also ==
- State Key Laboratories, a list of key laboratories with support from the central government of China
- Double First-Class Construction, a project of developing world-class universities by the central government of China
- C9 League, an inter-university group of nine universities in the China
- Project 985, a former project of developing 39 leading research universities in China
- Excellence League, an alliance of leading Chinese universities with strong backgrounds in engineering
- National Key Universities (China)
- Gaokao migration, internal migration in China built around this the gaokao exam
