= Ya-Jun Pan =

Chinese-Canadian mechanical engineer

Ya-Jun Pan is a Chinese and Canadian mechanical engineer whose research involves robust and nonlinear control for teleoperation and multi-agent systems. She is a professor of mechanical engineering at Dalhousie University, where she directs the Advanced Control and Mechatronics Laboratory.

== Education and career ==
Pan studied mechanical engineering at Yanshan University, graduating in 1996. After earning a master's degree in mechanical engineering at Zhejiang University in 1999, she completed a Ph.D. in electrical and computer engineering at the National University of Singapore in 2003.

Before becoming a faculty member at Dalhousie, she was a postdoctoral researcher in France with CNRS at the Laboratoire d'automatique de Grenoble, and in Canada at the University of Alberta.

== Recognition ==
Pan was named as an ASME Fellow in 2017. In 2021 she was elected as a Fellow of the Engineering Institute of Canada, as "an internationally renowned expert in robust nonlinear control and networked control systems with successful in-depth applications to tele-robotics, cooperative systems, unmanned systems, industrial automation, and rehabilitations". She was elected as a Fellow of the Canadian Academy of Engineering in 2023.
