= Xu Heyi =

Chinese executive and politician (born 1957)

- 徐和谊
- Born: November 1957 (age 68); Beijing, China
- Education: University of Science and Technology Beijing; China Europe International Business School; Huazhong University of Science and Technology
- Occupations: Executive, politician
- Years active: 1982–2023
- Political party: Chinese Communist Party (expelled)

Chinese name
- Simplified Chinese: 徐和谊
- Traditional Chinese: 徐和誼
Transcriptions
Standard Mandarin
- Hanyu Pinyin: Xú Héyí

Xu Heyi (Chinese: 徐和谊; born November 1957) is a former Chinese executive and politician of Hui ethnicity who served as chairman of BAIC Group. He was investigated by China's top anti-graft agency in March 2023.

He was a representative of the 18th National Congress of the Chinese Communist Party. He was a delegate to the 12th National People's Congress. He was a member of the 13th National Committee of the Chinese People's Political Consultative Conference.

== Early life and education ==
Xu was born in Beijing, in November 1957. He attended the University of Science and Technology Beijing where he received his bachelor's degree in 1982. After completing his MBA from China Europe International Business School, and he entered Huazhong University of Science and Technology where he obtained his doctor's degree in management science and engineering in 2006.

== Career ==
From 1982 to 1993, he worked at the BSIET. He was eventually promoted to president. He was assistant general manager and deputy general manager of Shougang Corporation in 1993 and subsequently deputy director and deputy party branch secretary of the Beijing Municipal Economic Commission in 1997. He also briefly served as deputy secretary of the Industrial Working Committee of the CCP Beijing Municipal Committee from 2001 to 2002. Since 2002, he successively worked at Beijing Automotive Industry Corp, Beijing Automotive Investment Co., Ltd., Beijing Hyundai Motor Co., Ltd., Beijing Benz Automotive Co., Ltd., BAIC Foton Automotive Co., Ltd., BAIC Motor Corporation Limited, and BAIC Group.

== Downfall ==
On 31 March 2023, Xu was investigated for "serious violations of laws and regulations" by the Central Commission for Discipline Inspection (CCDI), the party's internal disciplinary body, and the National Supervisory Commission, the highest anti-corruption agency of China.

On 28 September 2026, Xu was sentenced to death sentence with reprieve at the Beijing No.3 Intermediate People's Court for taking bribes and money laundering.

== Awards ==
- 2005 Model Worker of Beijing
- 2010 National May Day Nodel Worker Medal
- 2011 CCTV China Economic Person of 2010
- 2013 Leaders of the 60th Anniversary of the Automotive Industry in the People's Republic of China

Business positions
Preceded by ?	Chairman of BAIC Group; 2006–2020	Succeeded by Jiang Deyi
