= Double First-Class Construction =

Ongoing Chinese higher education development scheme

- 双一流建设
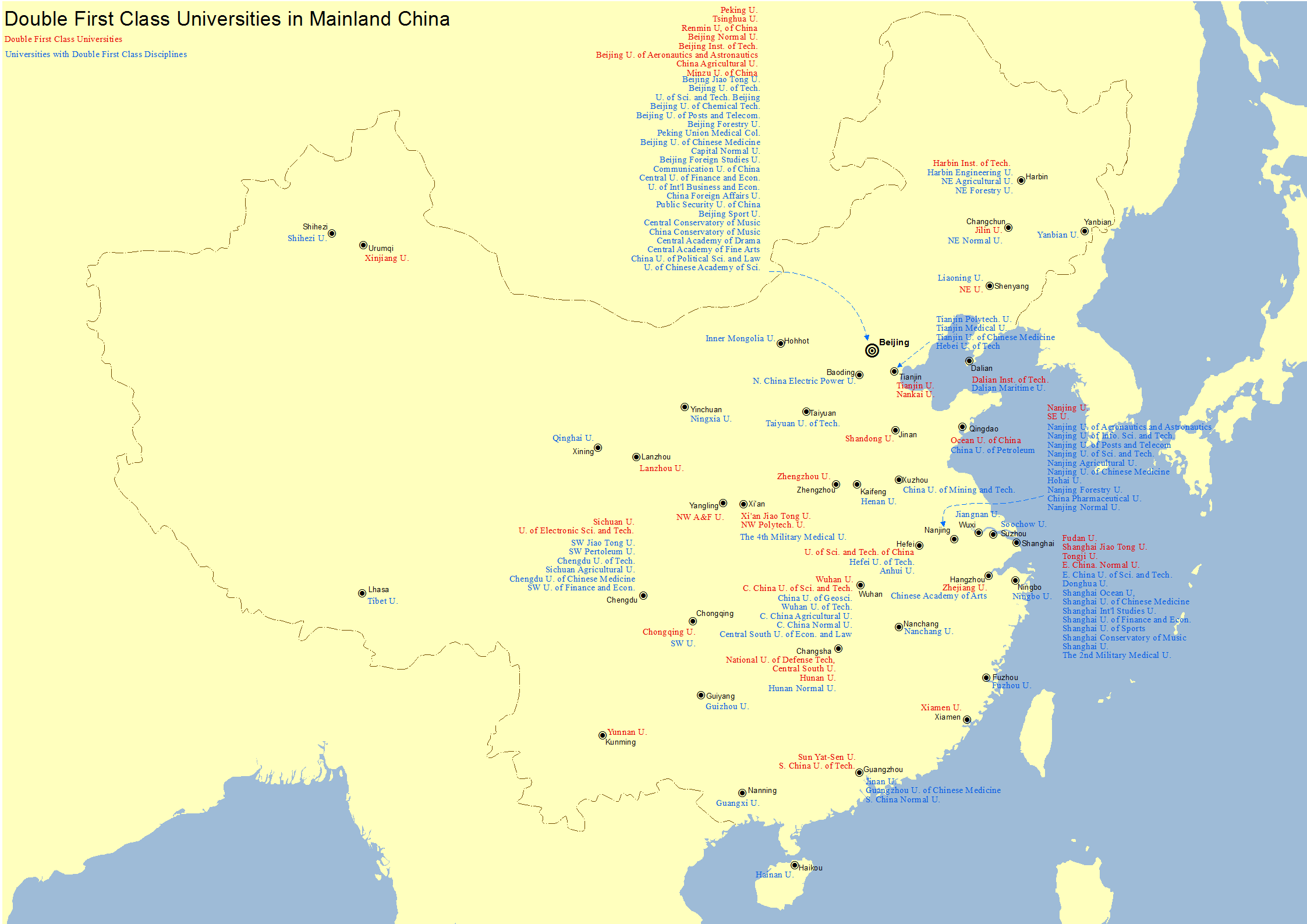
- Map of the universities and colleges selected for the Double First-Class Construction
- Predecessor: Project 211 and Project 985
- Formation: 2015; 11 years ago
- Region served: China
- Members: 147 public universities nationwide

The World First-Class Universities and First-Class Academic Disciplines Construction (世界一流大学和一流学科建设), together known as Double First-Class Initiative (双一流建设), is a higher education development and sponsorship scheme of the Chinese central government, initiated in 2015. The universities included in the Double First Class Initiative are recognized as "Double First-Class Universities". There are 147 universities and colleges selected to be part of the program.

The program was announced under the Xi Jinping administration in 2015 to replace the original higher education development programs Project 211 and Project 985.

== History ==
In October 2015, the State Council of China published the "Overall Plan for Promoting the Construction of World First-Class Universities and First-Class Disciplines" (Double First-Class Initiative), which made new arrangements for the development of higher education in China, replacing previous higher education projects.

In June 2016, the Ministry of Education of China announced that the Project 211 and Project 985 had been abolished and replaced by the Double First-Class Construction Initiative.

The purpose of the program is to "enhance the comprehensive strength and international competitiveness of China's higher education." The phase-specific objectives include that "an increasing number of Chinese universities and their disciplines join the ranks of world-class institutions, and a number of universities enter the forefront of global excellence, with a group of disciplines reaching the forefront of world-class standings by 2030," and "developing the Double First-Class Construction Universities into world-class higher education institutions through building and strengthening their faculties and departments by the mid-21st century."

In September 2017, the full list of the universities and their disciplines of the Double First-Class Construction was jointly published by the Ministry of Education of China, the Ministry of Finance of China and the National Development and Reform Commission of China. According to the list, 140 universities had been approved as 'Double First-Class Universities' by the State Council of China. The Double First-Class Construction policy sought to drive the overall development of universities by building and strengthening their faculties and departments, and ultimately develop the Double First-Class Construction Universities into world-class universities by 2050.

In February 2022, "Some Suggestions on Further Promoting the Construction of World First-Class Universities and First-Class Disciplines" were jointly published by the Ministry of Education, the Ministry of Finance, and the National Development and Reform Commission. In addition, with the approval of the State Council of China, the updated Phase 2 list of "Double First-Class Construction Universities" was released. Under the Phase 2 List of the Double First-Class Construction, the previous university classifications were abolished, and a total number of 147 universities were included in the plan (accounted for 4.88% of 3,012 Chinese higher education institutions), after 7 additional universities were added to the list.

== List of Double First-Class Universities ==
The Phase 1 list of 140 Double First-Class Universities was jointly issued by Chinese Ministry of Education, Ministry of Finance, and National Development and Reform Commission without any ranking within the lists (by "school code") in 2017. In February 2022, the Ministry of Education of China announced that the classifications had been invalidated, and the universities included in the Double First-Class Construction should be referred to as Double First-Class Universities. According to the updated Phase 2 list of the Double First-Class Universities (without any ranking within the list), a total of 147 universities have been approved and recognized as Double First-Class Universities.

- Beijing (34)
  - Beijing Foreign Studies University
  - Beijing Forestry University
  - Beijing Institute of Technology
  - Beijing Jiaotong University
  - Beijing Normal University
  - Beihang University
  - Beijing University of Chemical Technology
  - Beijing University of Chinese Medicine
  - Beijing University of Posts and Telecommunications
  - Beijing University of Technology
  - Capital Normal University
  - Central Academy of Drama
  - Central Academy of Fine Arts
  - Central Conservatory of Music
  - Central University of Finance and Economics
  - China Agricultural University
  - China Conservatory of Music
  - China Foreign Affairs University
  - China University of Geosciences (Beijing)
  - China University of Petroleum (Beijing)
  - China University of Mining and Technology (Beijing)
  - China University of Political Science and Law
  - Communication University of China
  - Minzu University of China
  - North China Electric Power University
  - Peking Union Medical College
  - Peking University
  - People's Public Security University of China
  - Renmin University of China
  - Tsinghua University
  - University of the Chinese Academy of Sciences
  - University of International Business and Economics
  - University of Science and Technology Beijing
- Jiangsu (16)
  - Nanjing (13)
    - China Pharmaceutical University
    - Hohai University
    - Nanjing University of Aeronautics and Astronautics
    - Nanjing Agricultural University
    - Nanjing Forestry University
    - Nanjing Medical University (Note: Newly added universities in the Phase 2 list of Double First-Class Construction.)
    - Nanjing Normal University
    - Nanjing University
    - Nanjing University of Chinese Medicine
    - Nanjing University of Information Science and Technology
    - Nanjing University of Posts and Telecommunications
    - Nanjing University of Science and Technology
    - Southeast University
  - Suzhou
    - Soochow University
  - Wuxi
    - Jiangnan University
  - Xuzhou
    - China University of Mining and Technology
- Shanghai (15)
  - Donghua University
  - East China Normal University
  - East China University of Science and Technology
  - Fudan University
  - Second Military Medical University
  - Shanghai Conservatory of Music
  - Shanghai International Studies University
  - Shanghai Jiao Tong University
  - Shanghai Ocean University
  - ShanghaiTech University
  - Shanghai University
  - Shanghai University of Finance and Economics
  - Shanghai University of Sport
  - Shanghai University of Traditional Chinese Medicine
  - Tongji University
- Guangdong (8)
  - Guangzhou (7)
    - Guangzhou Medical University
    - Guangzhou University of Chinese Medicine
    - Jinan University
    - South China Agricultural University
    - South China Normal University
    - South China University of Technology
    - Sun Yat-sen University
  - Shenzhen
    - Southern University of Science and Technology
- Shaanxi (8)
  - Xi'an (7)
    - Chang'an University
    - Fourth Military Medical University
    - Xi’an Jiaotong University
    - Xidian University
    - Shaanxi Normal University
    - Northwest University
    - Northwestern Polytechnical University
  - Xianyang
    - Northwest A&F University
- Sichuan (8)
  - Chengdu (7)
    - Chengdu University of Technology
    - Chengdu University of Traditional Chinese Medicine
    - Sichuan University
    - Southwest Jiaotong University
    - Southwest Petroleum University
    - Southwestern University of Finance and Economics
    - University of Electronic Science and Technology of China
  - Ya'an
    - Sichuan Agricultural University
- Wuhan, Hubei (7)
  - China University of Geosciences (Wuhan)
  - Wuhan University
  - Huazhong University of Science and Technology
  - Wuhan University of Technology
  - Huazhong Agricultural University
  - Central China Normal University
  - Zhongnan University of Economics and Law
- Tianjin (6)
  - Hebei University of Technology
  - Nankai University
  - Tianjin Medical University
  - Tiangong University
  - Tianjin University
  - Tianjin University of Traditional Chinese Medicine
- Hunan (5)
  - Changsha (4)
    - Central South University
    - Hunan Normal University
    - Hunan University
    - National University of Defense Technology
  - Xiangtan
    - Xiangtan University
- Harbin, Heilongjiang (4)
  - Harbin Engineering University
  - Harbin Institute of Technology
  - Northeast Agricultural University
  - Northeast Forestry University
- Liaoning (4)
  - Shenyang (2)
    - Liaoning University
    - Northeastern University
  - Dalian (2)
    - Dalian Maritime University
    - Dalian University of Technology
- Hefei, Anhui (3)
  - Anhui University
  - Hefei University of Technology
  - University of Science and Technology of China
- Jilin (3)
  - Changchun (2)
    - Jilin University
    - Northeast Normal University
  - Yanji
    - Yanbian University
- Shandong (3)
  - Qingdao (2)
    - Ocean University of China
    - China University of Petroleum (Huadong)
  - Jinan
    - Shandong University
- Zhejiang (3)
  - Hangzhou (2)
    - China Academy of Art
    - Zhejiang University
  - Ningbo
    - Ningbo University
- Chongqing (2)
  - Chongqing University
  - Southwest University
- Fujian (2)
  - Xiamen
    - Xiamen University
  - Fuzhou
    - Fuzhou University
- Henan (2)
  - Kaifeng
    - Henan University
  - Zhengzhou
    - Zhengzhou University
- Taiyuan, Shanxi (2)
  - Shanxi University
  - Taiyuan University of Technology
- Xinjiang (2)
  - Shihezi
    - Shihezi University
  - Ürümqi
    - Xinjiang University
- Guiyang, Guizhou
  - Guizhou University
- Lanzhou, Gansu
  - Lanzhou University
- Haikou, Hainan
  - Hainan University
- Nanchang, Jiangxi
  - Nanchang University
- Xining, Qinghai
  - Qinghai University
- Kunming, Yunnan
  - Yunnan University
- Nanning, Guangxi
  - Guangxi University
- Hohhot, Inner Mongolia
  - Inner Mongolia University
- Yinchuan, Ningxia
  - Ningxia University
- Lhasa, Tibet
  - Tibet University

== Re-assessment ==
According to the 'Phase 2 List of the Double First-Class Initiative' jointly published by the Ministry of Education, the Ministry of Finance, and the National Development and Reform Commission in February 2022, 15 universities received warnings on their Double First-Class status revocation (including Anhui University, Beijing University of Chinese Medicine, Central China Normal University, Guangxi University, Inner Mongolia University, Liaoning University, Ningbo University, Ningxia University, Northeast Normal University, Shanghai University of Finance and Economics, Tibet University, Third Military Medical University, Xinjiang University, Yanbian University, and Zhongnan University of Economics and Law). These 15 universities were required to rectify and improve their research qualities and development, and if the universities failed to pass the final assessment in 2024, they would lose their Double First-Class Construction statuses.

== See also ==
- List of universities in China
- National Key Universities (China)
- State Key Laboratories, a group of key laboratories sponsored and supervised by the central government of China
- Project 985, an abolished project of developing 39 leading research universities in China
- Project 211, an abolished program for developing China's comprehensive universities
- Excellence League, an alliance of leading Chinese universities with strong backgrounds in engineering
