= Hu Peiquan =

Chinese engineering mechanician (1920–2019)

Hu Peiquan (Chinese: 胡沛泉; Wade–Giles: Hu P'ei-ch'üan; 19 June 1920 – 19 February 2019) was a Chinese engineering mechanician, aerospace engineer, and educator. He was a distinguished professor and founder of the Department of Engineering Mechanics at Northwestern Polytechnical University. He founded the Journal of Northwestern Polytechnical University and served as its chief editor for more than 60 years.

== Early life and education ==
Hu was born on 19 June 1920 in Wuxi, Jiangsu, Republic of China. At age 16, he was admitted to St. John's University, Shanghai, and graduated four years later with a bachelor's degree in civil engineering. He then went to the United States to study at the University of Michigan, where he earned his master's degree at age 21 and his Ph.D. in engineering mechanics at age 24.

== Career ==
In 1944, Hu became a researcher at the Langley Research Center of the National Advisory Committee for Aeronautics (NACA, the predecessor of NASA). He was promoted to senior engineer within three years, at the age of only 27.

In 1948, Hu returned to China to teach at his alma mater, St. John's University. After the founding of the People's Republic of China in 1949, the missionary St. John's University was closed in 1952 and Hu became a professor at the East China Aeronautics Institute. Four years later, East China Aeronautics Institute was relocated to Xi'an in Northwest China and then became part of the new Northwestern Polytechnical University. Hu moved to Xi'an and spent the rest of his career at the university, while his wife and daughter stayed in Wuxi.

Together with Ji Wenmei (季文美), Hu founded the engineering mechanics department at Northwestern Polytechnical University, and it was one of the first in China. In 1961, the university established one of the first graduate programs in China, with Hu serving as director, and Zhou Yaohe as his deputy. Of the 61 students accepted into the first class of the program, two were later elected academicians of the Chinese Academy of Sciences or the Chinese Academy of Engineering, and many became university presidents, corporate chief executives, or chief engineers.

Hu founded the Journal of Northwestern Polytechnical University in 1957 and served as its chief editor for more than 60 years.

== Death ==
Hu died on 19 February 2019 in Xi'an, at the age of 98.
