= Sino-Spanish University Alliance =

University consortium connecting universities in China and Spain

- 中国–西班牙大学联盟
- Abbreviation: SSU
- Formation: 2009; 17 years ago
- Purpose: To establish communication and cooperation in terms of scientific collaboration, student exchange and talent development between universities in China and Spain
- Headquarters: Beijing
- Location(s): China & Spain
- Members: 16 universities
- Website: international.bit.edu.cn/yqlj/b31345.htm

Chinese name
- Simplified Chinese: 中国–西班牙大学联盟
- Traditional Chinese: 中國–西班牙大學聯盟
Transcriptions
Standard Mandarin
- Hanyu Pinyin: Zhōngguó-Xībānyá Dàxué Liánméng

The Sino-Spanish University Alliance (SSU) is a consortium of 16 leading universities in China and Spain. SSU was initiated by Beijing Institute of Technology and Technical University of Madrid and was formally founded on 14 June 2009 in Beijing. SSU aims to establish the communication and cooperation between universities in China and Spain, and to promote scientific collaboration, student exchange and talent development.

== Members ==
=== China ===
- Beijing Institute of Technology
- Beijing Jiaotong University
- Beihang University
- Beijing University of Chemical Technology
- Beijing University of Technology
- Harbin Institute of Technology
- North China Electric Power University
- Northwestern Polytechnical University
- Nanjing University of Aeronautics and Astronautics
- Nanjing University of Science and Technology
- University of Science and Technology Beijing

=== Spain ===
- Technical University of Madrid
- Technical University of Valencia
- Polytechnic University of Catalonia
- University of Barcelona
- Autonomous University of Madrid
