= Northwestern Polytechnical University =

Public university in Xi'an, Shaanxi, China

- 西北工业大学
- Other name: NWPU
- Motto: 公诚勇毅
- Motto in English: Loyalty, Integrity, Courage, and Perseverance
- Type: Public
- Established: 1938; 88 years ago
- Affiliations: Excellence League; Sino-Spanish University Alliance (SSU)
- President: Song Baowei (宋保维)
- Faculty: 3,600
- Students: 28,131
- Undergraduates: 14,395
- Postgraduates: 13,736
- Doctoral students: 5,000
- Location: Xi'an, Shaanxi, China; 34°14′41″N 108°54′42″E
- Campus: Urban; 0.8 km^{2} (0.31 sq mi) (Youyi campus); 2.6 km^{2} (1.0 sq mi) (Chang'an campus)
- Newspaper: 西北工大报
- Colors: Blue & silver
- Mascot: Aoxiang
- Website: nwpu.edu.cn

Chinese name
- Simplified Chinese: 西北工业大学
- Traditional Chinese: 西北工業大學
Transcriptions
Standard Mandarin
- Hanyu Pinyin: Xīběi Gōngyè Dàxué

Northwestern Polytechnical University (NWPU; 西北工业大学) is a public science and engineering university in Xi'an, Shaanxi, China. It is affiliated with the Ministry of Industry and Information Technology. The university is part of Project 211, Project 985, and the Double First-Class Construction.

== History ==
NPU builds upon the legacies of its three major predecessors.

=== Predecessors ===
==== Northwestern Engineering Institute ====
In 1938, due to the Japanese invasion of China, many universities in the occupied east evacuated to "Free China" in the western hinterland. Among those that fled to Shaanxi, the National Beiyang Engineering Institute, the Engineering School of Beiping University, the Engineering School of the National Northeastern University, and the (private) Jiaozuo Engineering Institute were combined to form the National Northwestern Engineering Institute in Hanzhong, a city surrounded by mountains. In 1946, after the surrender of Japan, Northwestern Engineering Institute was relocated to the city of Xianyang.

==== East China Aeronautics Institute ====
In 1952, to meet the demand for concentrated aeronautics research, the departments of aeronautical engineering of the former National Central University (later known as Nanjing University), Jiaotong University and Zhejiang University were relocated to Nanjing and combined to form the East China Aeronautics Institute. This institute was relocated to Xi'an and renamed the Xi'an Aeronautics Institute, which is the second predecessor of the NPU, in 1956.

In 1957, the Northwestern Engineering Institute and the Xi'an Aeronautics Institute were merged to form NPU, which concentrated its research efforts on defense technology for aeronautics, astronautics and marine engineering.

==== People's Liberation Army Military Engineering Institute ====
In 1970, due to deteriorating relations with the former USSR, the People's Liberation Army Military Engineering Institute, which was located in Harbin, was disassembled. Many of its departments were relocated from the city near the China-Soviet border; among these, its Department of Aeronautical Engineering (the third predecessor of NPU) was moved to Xi'an and merged with the other two predecessors to form NPU.

=== Recent history ===
NWPU is subjected to sanctions by the United States and Taiwan for its ties to the PLA. In 2022, Chinese government agencies and private security firms attributed a cyberattack against NWPU to the NSA.

== Campuses ==
NPU's campuses comprise about 4.58 km^{2}, with the Youyi Campus, located in Beilin District, Xi'an, comprising about 0.8 km^{2} and the Chang'an Campus, located in Chang'an District, Xi'an, comprising about 2.6 km^{2}. and the Taicang Campus, located in Suzhou, Jiangsu, comprising about 1.18 km^{2}.

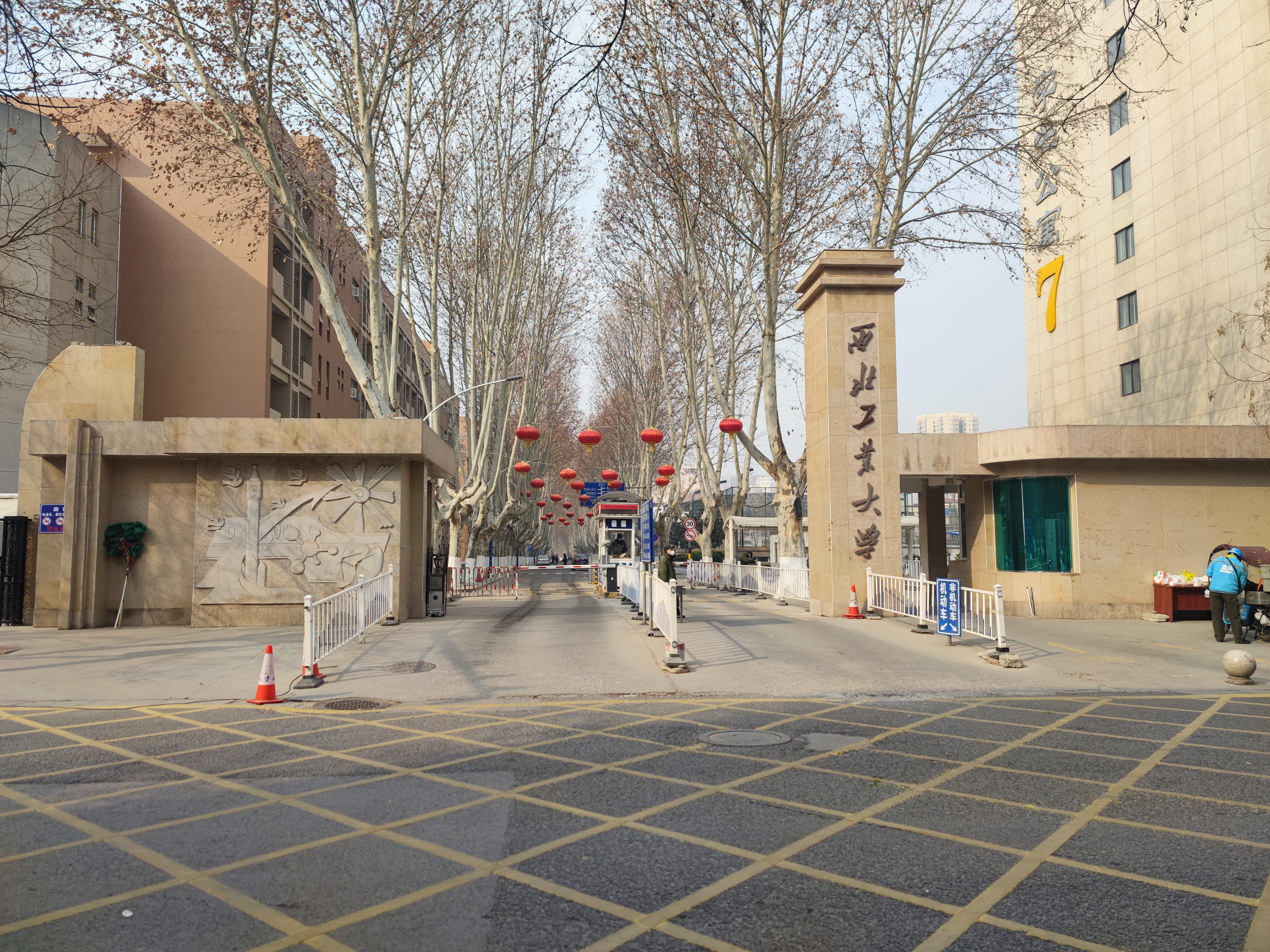
East Gate of Youyi Campus, Northwestern Polytechnical University, Beilin District, Xi'an, China

=== Youyi Campus ===
The Youyi Campus, often referred as the 'old campus', is divided into three parts: the South, the West and the North by the West Youyi Road and the South Laodong Road. The campus contains education facilities, apartments of teachers and students, stadiums, logistics facilities, a kindergarten and the primary and middle school affiliated with NPU.

=== Chang'an Campus ===
The Chang'an Campus, often referred as the 'new campus', is divided into two parts: the East and the West by the Dongxiang Road. This campus contains many newly built administration buildings, school buildings, experiments facilities, sports facilities and so on. It serves as the main base for undergraduate education of NPU.

=== Taicang Campus ===
The Taicang Campus, located at the border between Suzhou and Shanghai, is currently under construction and will start to run in September 2021. This campus will contain 10 schools including School of Artificial Intelligence, School of Flexible Electronics, School of Business etc. It will serve around 10,000 students.

=== Infrastructure development ===
NPU is building or going to build more facilities on both of these two campuses. Supported by the Ministry of Industry and Information Technology and the former Commission for Science, Technology and Industry for National Defense, NPU has received a 1.58 billion CNY (US$252.8 million) investment in infrastructure constructions from the central government and there're more than 20 construction projects running currently including the Material Science Building, the Innovation Science and Technology Building, the Reconstruction of Dangerous and Old Apartments after the earthquake, the #1 Student Apartment in the Youyi Campus and the New Library, Infrastructure Plan I & II, the High-tech Experimental Research Center and others in the Chang'an Campus.

== Academics ==
NPU has a strong research capacity in engineering. It was confirmed as one of the National Key Universities by the State Council in 1960. In the seventh and eighth Five-year plan, NPU was listed as one of the 15 National Key Developing Universities. In the ninth Five-year plan, NPU joined the Project 211. And, in the tenth Five-year plan, NPU joined the Project 985.

Since its establishment, NPU has educated more than 150,000 high level technicians and researchers for China's defense industry and national economy development. The first PhD from 6 disciplines in China was graduated from NPU. And, among NPU's alumni, there are more than 30 fellows of the CAS and the CAE, 30 generals in PLA and 6 recipients of China's TOP 10 Outstanding Youth Elite.

=== Accreditation and memberships ===
NPU is one of the Seven Sons of National Defence and member of SAP University Alliances.

=== Rankings and reputation ===
University rankings
BCUR National	Domestic	21
Wu Shulian National	Domestic	20
CUAA National	Alumni	23
QS National	General	33
THE National	General	20–24
QS Asia (Asia version)	General	=173
THE Asia (Asia version)	General	=51
ARWU World	Research	101–150
QS World	General	=499
THE World	General	251–300
USNWR World	General	182

In 2026, Northwestern Polytechnical University was listed as one of the world's top 200 universities in the Academic Ranking of World Universities and the U.S. News & World Report Best Global University Ranking.

In 2022, NPU ranked 25th in the Best Chinese Universities Ranking compiled by Shanghai Ruanke. NPU's engineering ranked the tenth among China's engineering universities.

According to the results of the third Evaluation of Disciplines by the Ministry of Education of the People's Republic of China, the ranks of parts of NPU's disciplines are shown below.

Discipline	Rank
Material Science and Engineering	3
Aeronautical and Astronautical Science and Technology	1
Armament Science and Technology	3
Marine Science and Application	5
Dynamics	7
Computer Science and Technology	12
Mechanics Engineering	14
Control Science and Engineering	14
Transportation Engineering	15
Electronic Science and Engineering	17
Instrument Science and Technology	18
Power Engineering and Engineering Thermophysics	18
Information and Communication Engineering	20
Electrical Engineering	23
BiomedicalEngineering	23
Optical Engineering	24
Architecture	26
Mathematics	36
Chemistry	39
Civil Engineering	46
Business Administration	50
Foreign Languages and Literatures	52
Public Management	55
Applied Economics	58
Biology	64
Marxist Theory	69
Laws	72

=== Laboratories ===
The university has seven State Key Laboratories and 28 Province/Ministry-level Key Laboratories. Only the State Key Laboratories are listed below. These labs often specialize in particular areas of academic research and receive government funding:

- Materials science
- Chemistry
- Mathematics and Physics
- Geography
- Biotechnology
- Information technology
- Engineering
- Medicine

Name	Supporting School
State Key Laboratory of Solidification Processing	School of Materials Science and Engineering
State Key Laboratory of Airfoil, Cascade Aerodynamics	School of Aeronautics & School of Power and Energy
State Key Laboratory of Torpedo Guidance Technology	School of Marine Technology
State Key Laboratory of Heat Structure and Inner Flow Field of Combustion of Solid Rocket Motor	School of Astronautics
State Key Laboratory of UAV Special Technology	Institute of National Defense
State Key Laboratory of Superhigh Temperature Structural Composite Materials	School of Materials Science and Engineering
State Key Laboratory of Space Flight Dynamics Technology	School of Astronautics

== Organization ==
=== Education Experimental School ===
The Education Experimental School is the college with special honors in NPU. Its predecessor is the Education Reform Class established in 1985 which was upgraded to the current school in 2001. The aim of this school is to provide the most elite students of NPU with the best resources so that they can become future leaders in their fields.

=== Academic schools ===
NPU has 15 academic schools, 1 educational experimental school (known as Honors College), 1 independent school, 1 joint school and some other administrative schools. The university offers 58 undergraduate programs, 117 master programs, 67 doctorate programs and 14 postdoctoral programs. Currently, there are 2 First-level National Key Disciplines, 7 Second-level National Key Disciplines, 2 National Key (to cultivate) Disciplines, 21 First-level Disciplines for Doctorate Degree Granting and 31 First-level Disciplines for master's degree Granting. Additionally, NPU has 7 State Key Laboratories, 28 Province/Ministry-level Key Laboratories and 19 Province/Ministry-level Engineering Research Centers. The 15 academic schools of NPU are listed here in the official order.

1. School of Aeronautics
2. School of Astronautics
3. School of Marine Science and Technology
4. School of Materials Science and Engineering
5. School of Mechanical Engineering
6. School of Mechanics, Civil Engineering and Architecture
7. School of Power and Energy
8. School of Electronics and Information
9. School of Automation
10. School of Computer Science and Technology
11. School of Science
12. School of Management
13. School of Humanities, Economics and Law
14. School of Software and Microelectronics
15. School of Life Science
16. School of Foreign Languages
17. Queen Mary University of London Engineering School, NPU

=== Other schools ===
Besides the 15 major academic schools and the education experimental school, NPU has other schools or institutes. They are:

- Engineering Practice Exercise Center
- Physical Education Department
- Continuing Education School
- Internet Education School
- International College
- National Secrecy School
- Mingde College (independent)

== Notable alumni ==
- Wu Yi – Former Vice Premier of the State Council of the People's Republic of China
- Hao Peng – Party Committee Secretary of the State-owned Assets Supervision and Administration Commission (SASAC); former Governor of Qinghai province
- Zhang Qingwei – Communist Party Secretary of Heilongjiang province; former Governor of Hebei province
- Yang Wei – president of Zhejiang University, aircraft designer in 611
- Yuan-Cheng Fung – graduate from department of Engineering of National Central University (Nanjing University, Present), which is one of the predecessors of Northwestern Polytechnical University
- Jasen Wang – Founder and CEO of Makeblock
- Zhao Chunling – lead designer of the Comac C929 airliner

== Notable faculty members ==
- Hu Peiquan, Founder of the Department of Engineering Mechanics and the Journal of Northwestern Polytechnical University
- Chuah Hean Teik, Consultant Professor to Northwestern Polytechnical University and Former President cum CEO of Universiti Tunku Abdul Rahman
