= Beijing Jiaotong University =

Chinese public university

- 北京交通大学
- Motto: 知行
- Motto in English: knowing and doing
- Type: Public
- Established: 1896; 130 years ago
- Affiliations: Beijing Tech; SSU; CDIO Initiative
- President: Wang Jiaqiong (Chinese: 王稼琼; pinyin: Wáng Jià Qióng)
- Administrative staff: 2,980
- Undergraduates: 14,620
- Postgraduates: 8,036
- Location: 3 Shangyuan Village, Haidian, Beijing, China; 39°57′00″N 116°20′14″E
- Campus: Urban
- Colors: Blue
- Website: bjtu.edu.cn

Chinese name
- Simplified Chinese: 北京交通大学
- Traditional Chinese: 北京交通大學
Transcriptions
Standard Mandarin
- Hanyu Pinyin: Běijīng Jiāotōng Dàxué

Beijing Jiaotong University (BJTU; Chinese: 北京交通大学; lit. 'Beijing Transport University'; previously Northern Jiaotong University) is a public university in Haidian, Beijing, China. It is affiliated with the Ministry of Education, and co-funded by the Ministry of Education, the Ministry of Transport, the Beijing Municipal People's Government, and China State Railway Group Company Limited. The university is part of the Double First-Class Construction and Project 211.

== History ==
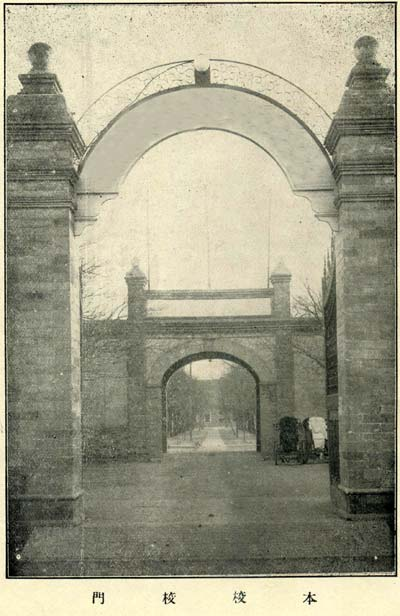
The Old Gate pictured in 1920.

The university was a component of Jiaotong University (also named Chiao Tung University). In September 1909 the Postal Department of the Qing government founded the Railway Management Institute in Beijing. In 1920 the Republic of China was founded and BJTU was attached to the Ministry of Transportation and Communications with its name changed to "Ministry of Communications Traffic Training Institute". Meanwhile, it increased some subjects including the electrical engineering, cable broadcast and radio. In 1921 it merged with two technical schools in Shanghai and Tangshan to form the Jiaotong University. There were three campuses in Beijing, Shanghai and Tangshan.Beijing Jiaotong University was called "Jiaotong University Beijing School" at that time. The Beijing campus was named National Jiaotong University, Beijing (中国交通大学) in 1949. In 1950 the Beijing campus was renamed Northern Jiaotong University (北方交通大学). In September 2003 it was renamed Beijing Jiaotong University (北京交通大学) to make its locality explicit. The Shanghai campus has since separated into two universities which are now Shanghai Jiaotong University (上海交通大学) and Xi'an Jiaotong University (西安交通大学).

There are five Jiaotong Universities in China named: Shanghai Jiaotong University, Xi'an Jiaotong University, Beijing Jiaotong University, Southwest Jiaotong University and National Chiao Tung University.

Beijing Jiaotong University is listed in the Double First-Class Construction, former 211 Project universities and 985 Project Innovation Platform. In 2017, Beijing Jiaotong University enters the ranks of double first-class construction.

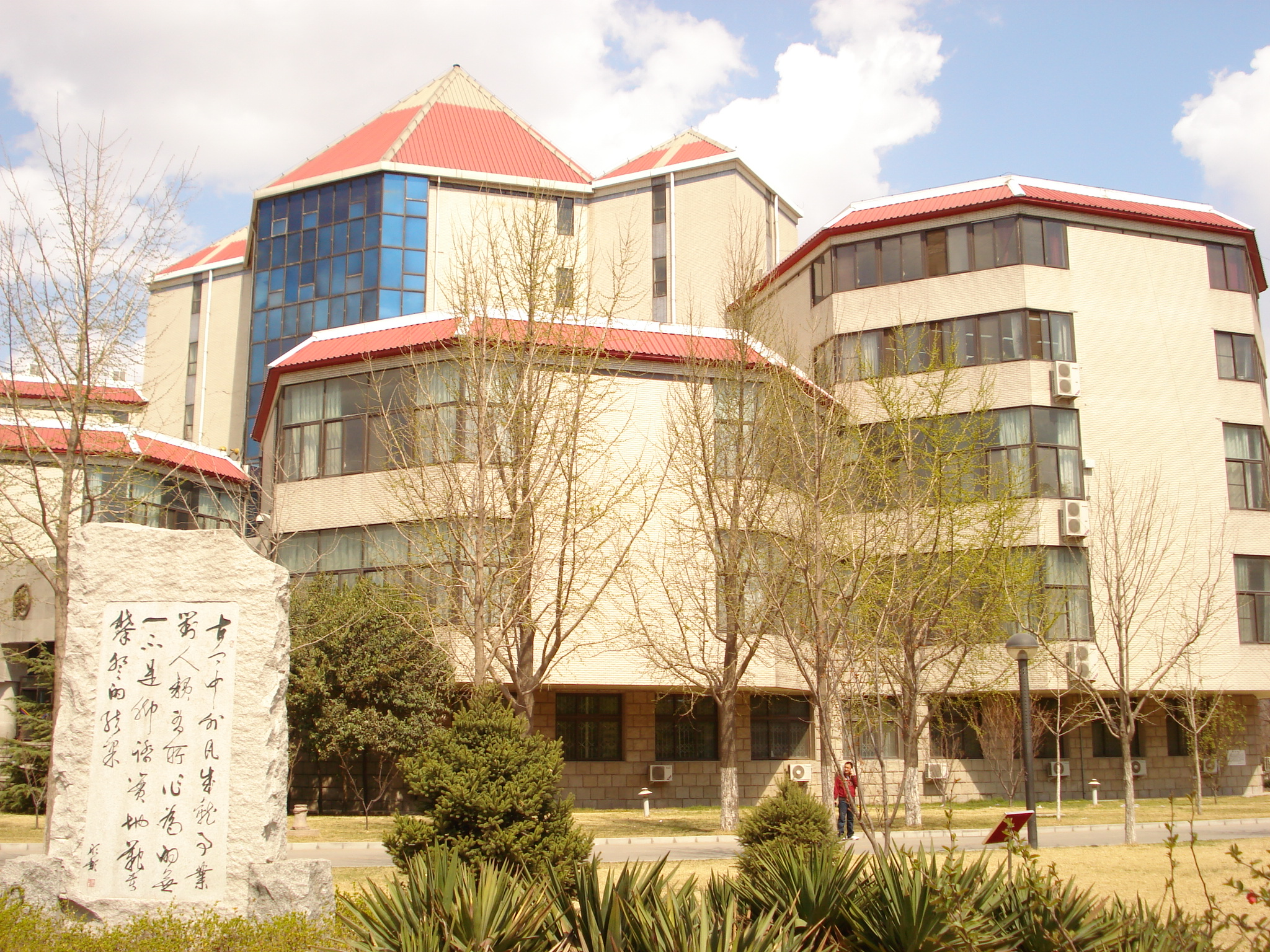
The Library as of 2007.

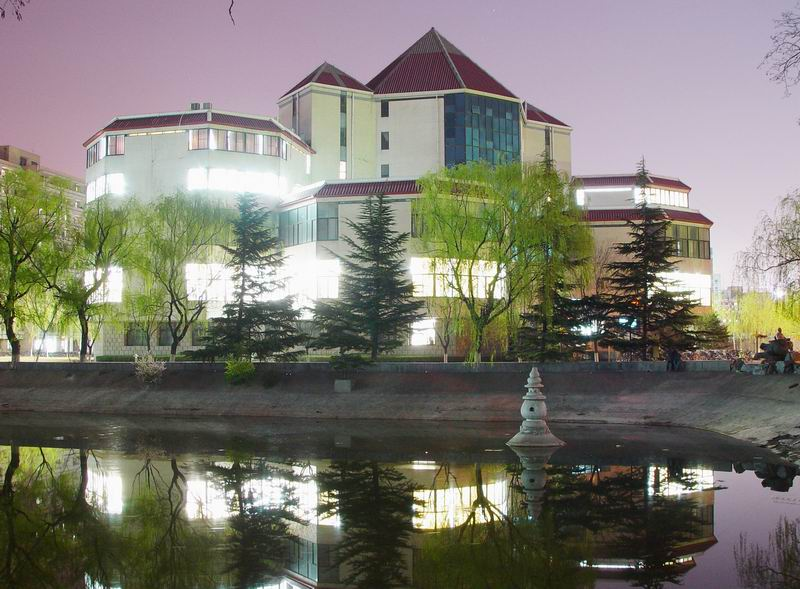
Another look at the Library at night.

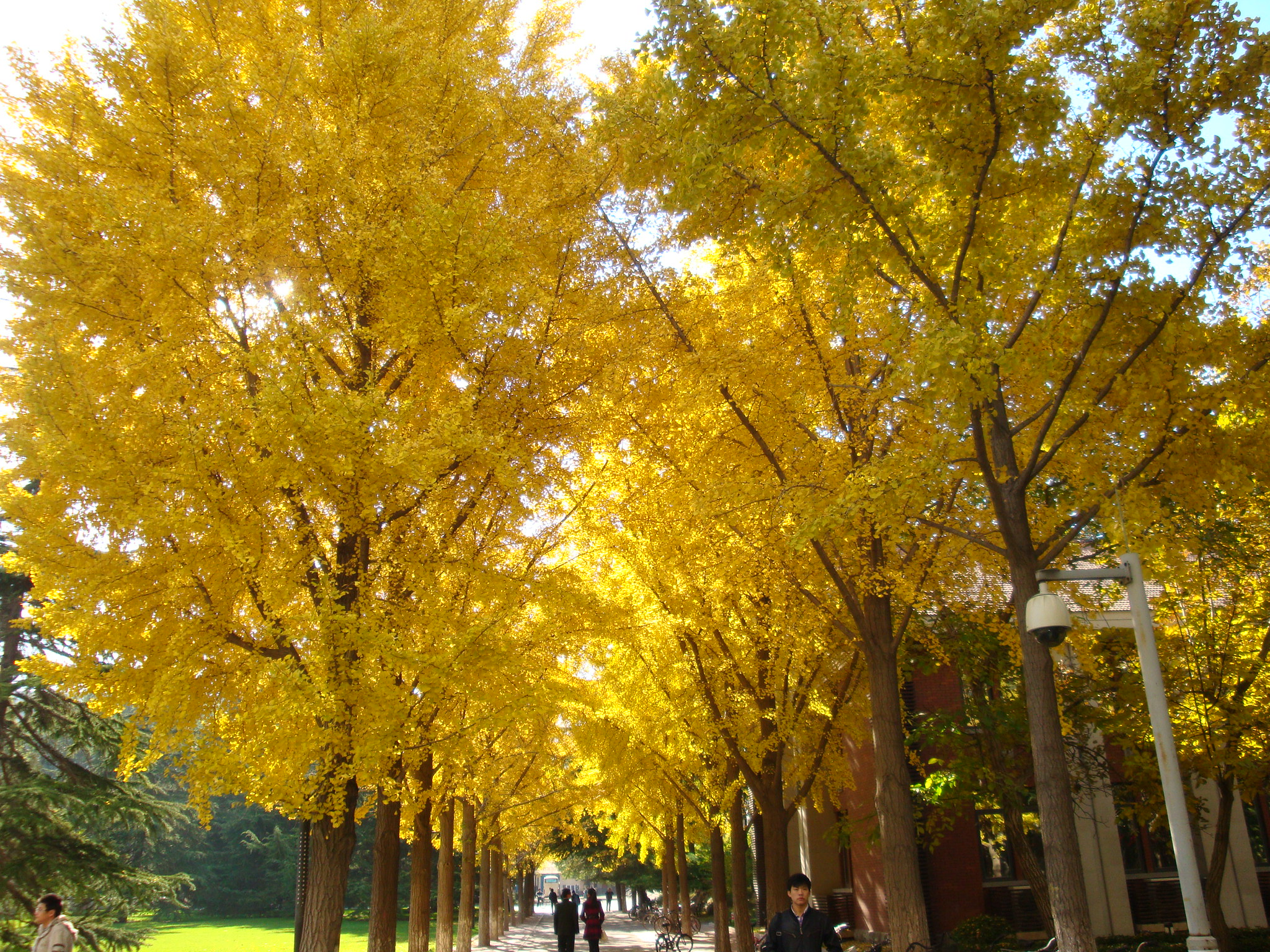
The ginkgo trees on the campus turn yellow as the autumn season deepens. November 2010.

=== Schools and faculties ===
As of 2009, Beijing Jiaotong University has the following under its administration:

- Electronic Information Engineering Institute
- Computer and Informational Technology Institute
- Economy Management Institute
- Communication and Transportation Institute
- Civil Engineering and Architecture Institute
- Mechanical and Electronic Control Engineering Institute
- Electric Power Institute
- Physical Sciences Institute
- Humanities and Social Sciences Institute
- Languages and communication studies Institute
- Long-Distance and Continued Education Institute
- Software Engineering Institute
- Architecture and Art Institute

The university has 22 research institutes and 39 laboratories which include the transportation system simulation laboratory and transportation automation laboratory.

The university library has over a million books, 3000 Chinese and foreign journals, numerous documents on microfiche and audio and video documents on various modern media.

Beijing Jiaotong's facilities include its own transmitter tower, hospital, hotels, TV station, indoor and outdoor swimming pool, gym, arboretum, moot courts, museum, art gallery, railway line and stadium.

As of 2017, there are 25,569 full-time students on the campus. There are 7,527 graduate students working on master's or PhD programs, 500 international students and 8,767 engaged in correspondence programs, night schools and other full-time programs.

There are 2844 faculty members and scientists at the university, 10 of which are academicians of the Chinese Academy of Sciences and Chinese Academy of Engineering, 286 full professors and 588 associate professors. The Transportation, Engineering, Law and ICT faculties are particularly well-regarded.

== Identity ==
=== Badge ===
- Outer ring circle and gear circle are concentric circles in calibration
- The school name is Mao Zedong font "Beifang Jiaotong University"
- English use balc font "BEIJING JIAOTONG UNIVERSITY"
- "1896" representative school founding time
- The round anvil, hammer, chain and gear symbolize industrial manufacturing and products; books symbolize science and knowledge; gear symbolize management, reflecting that the school is a university with science and engineering as its main part.

=== Motto ===
Beijing Jiaotong University students' time: “知行”

== International students ==
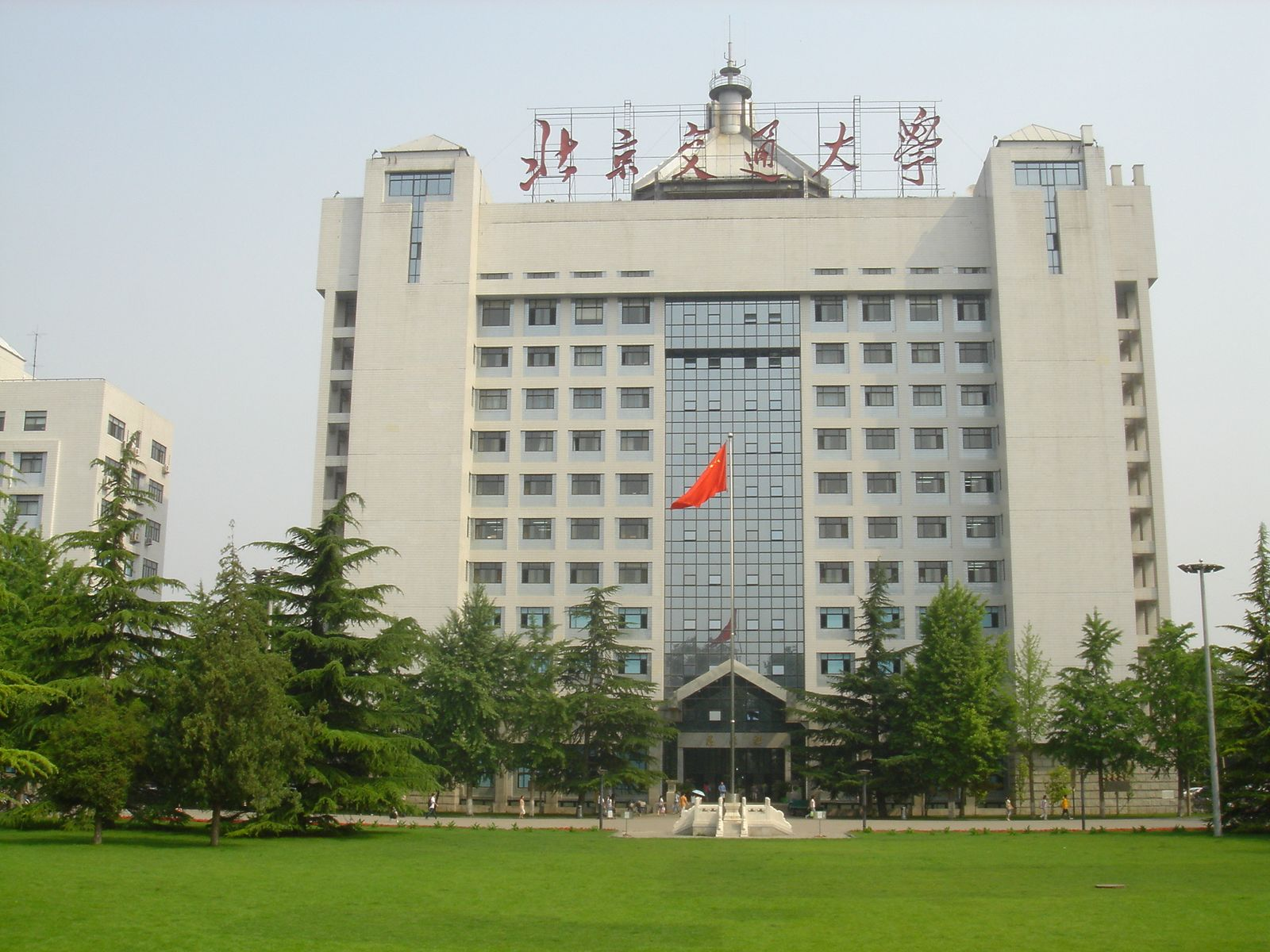
Siyuan Building

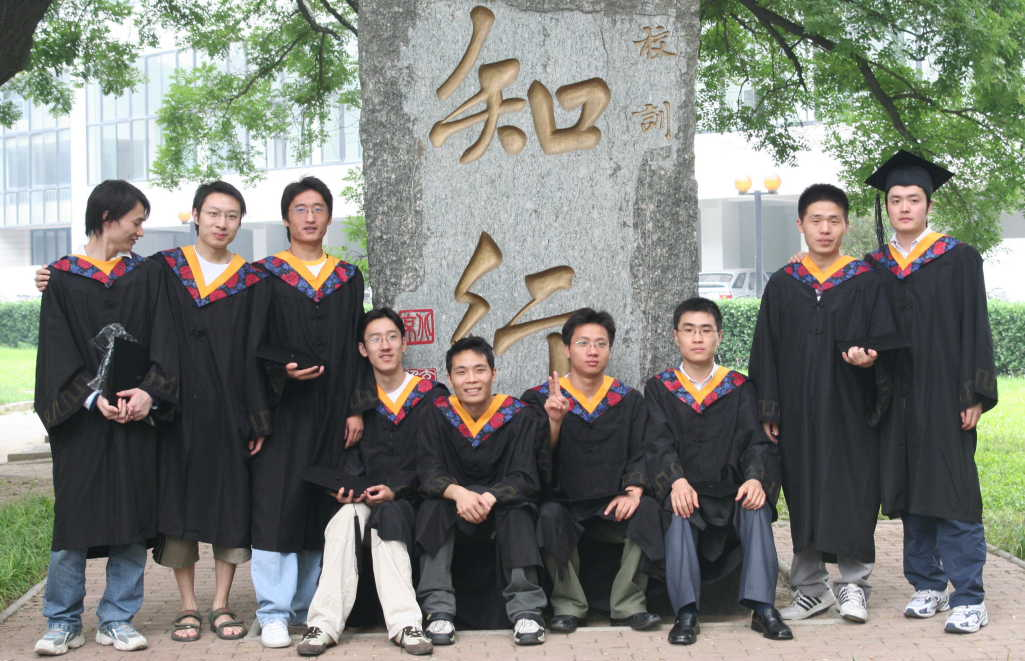
Students on Graduation Day

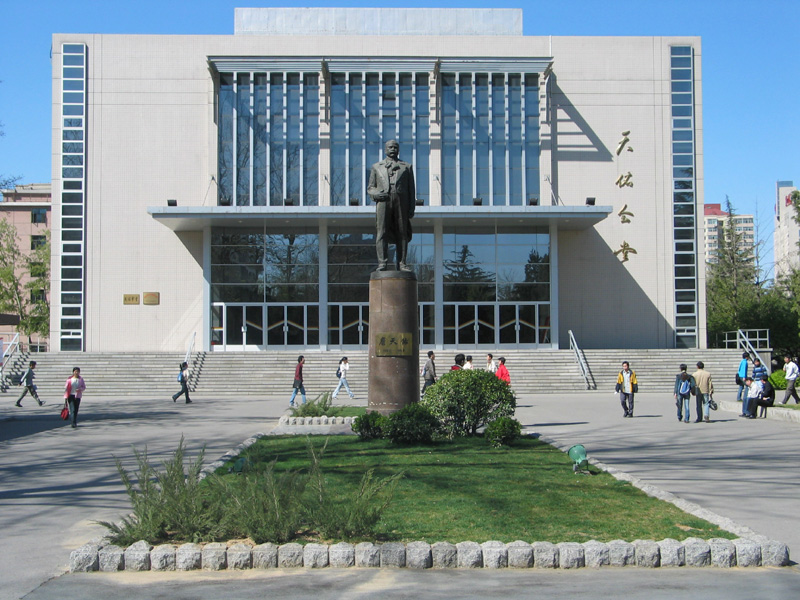
Tianyou Great Hall

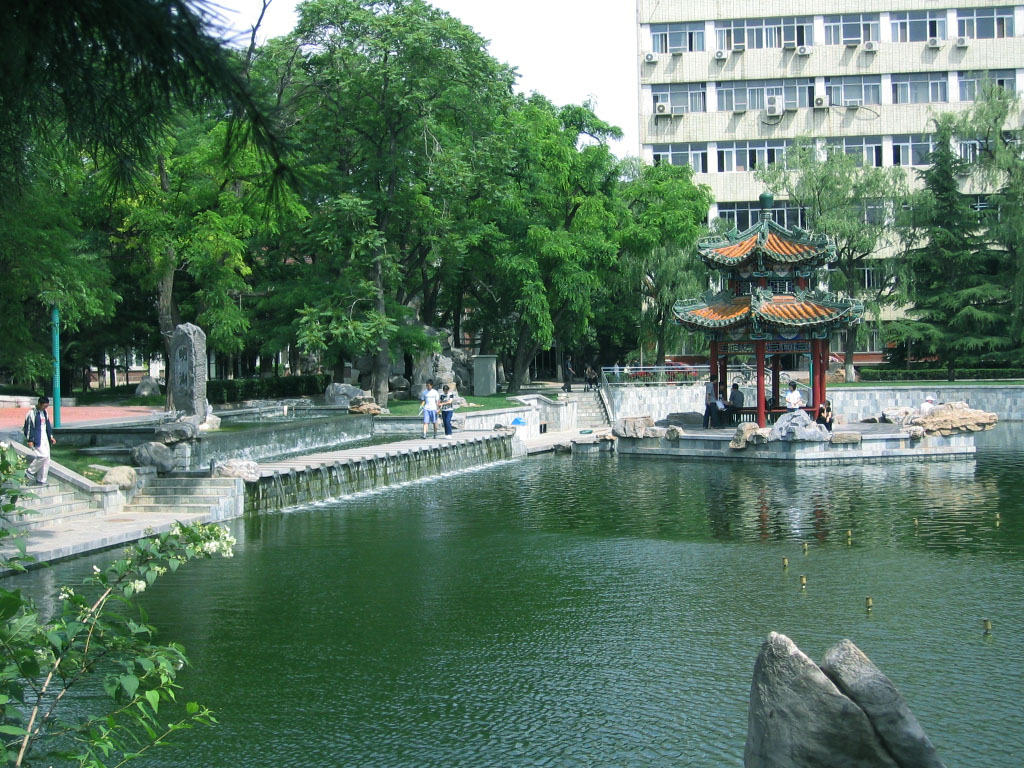
Pool of Brightness

The university is a member of the Beijing University of Science and Technology Alliance. According to the university website, in July 2018 the university established cooperative relations with 235 universities and famous multinational enterprises in 45 countries including the United States, Britain, Germany and France.

Confucius Institutes have been established in Belgium, United States and Brazil to spread Chinese culture throughout the world. In 2017 the school officially joined the international railway cooperation organization (OSJD) which enhanced the school's influence and voice in the international railway field.

Joining the China-CEEC Association of Colleges and Universities has laid a solid foundation for the university to expand its cooperation and exchanges with central and eastern European countries. BJTU hosted the Belt and Road Initiative rail transit training school and the annual meeting of the China-ASEAN rail transit training alliance.

University rankings

Global – Overall
- QS World: 851-900 (2026)

The university signed a cooperation agreement with Russia and Zhan Tianyou College. China and Indonesia signed a cooperation agreement on jointly building a China-Indonesia high-speed railway research center with the Bandung Institute of Technology in Indonesia. BJTU also offers Dual Degree Program with Universiti Malaysia Pahang in Malaysia.

BJTU is also one of the first universities authorized by the Chinese government to accept foreign students. BJTU enrolled over 3,000 foreign students and visiting scholars from as many as 71 countries in Asia, Africa, Europe and North America. BJTU has agreements with universities in the United States, France, United Kingdom, Germany, Switzerland, Singapore, Japan, Australia. Former U.S. President Barack Obama visited JiaoDa during a state visit to Beijing.

=== "Entering China" project ===
"Entering China" is an international exchange program sponsored by BJTU and the China Women and Children Development Center.

The project promotes international education, cultural exchange and cooperation between Chinese and foreign students. The program is jointly organized by BJTU and the China Women and Children Development Center in order to provide comprehensive education services for international students.

In 2007, BJTU appointed Studypath as a strategic technology partner to co-ordinate student enrollment in the project. The online service is a 'technological study-path' available worldwide that supports the exchange program both before and after the students arrive in China.

BJTU also cooperates with Shanghai Jiaotong University allowing business and economics students to use both campuses.

== Notable alumni ==
- Hu Haifeng, politician, child of former General Secretary of the Chinese Communist Party, President of China, Chairman of the Central Military Commission, paramount leader Hu Jintao (fourth generation of Chinese leadership).
- Cheng Kejie, former Vice Chairman of the Standing Committee of the National People's Congress.
- Liang Tsai-Ping, guzheng player.
- Mao Yisheng, structural engineer, an expert on bridge construction, and a social activist.
- Zheng Zhenduo, journalist, writer, archaeologist, and scholar.
- Li Hejun, founder and chairman of Hanergy.
