= Beijing Forestry University =

University in Beijing, China

Coordinates: 40°00′05″N 116°20′43″E

- 北京林业大学
- Motto: 知山知水，树木树人 (Note: 原校训为：“养清松正气，法竹梅风骨”。)
- Type: Public
- Established: 1952; 74 years ago
- Affiliations: Double First-Class Construction; Project 211; National Key Universities; Beijing Tech
- President: 安黎哲
- Faculty: 1,079
- Undergraduates: 13,240 (2016.12)
- Postgraduates: 5,138 (2016.12)
- Location: Haidian, Beijing
- Website: www.bjfu.edu.cn

Chinese name
- Simplified Chinese: 北京林业大学
- Traditional Chinese: 北京林業大學
Transcriptions
Standard Mandarin
- Hanyu Pinyin: Běijīng Línyè Dàxué

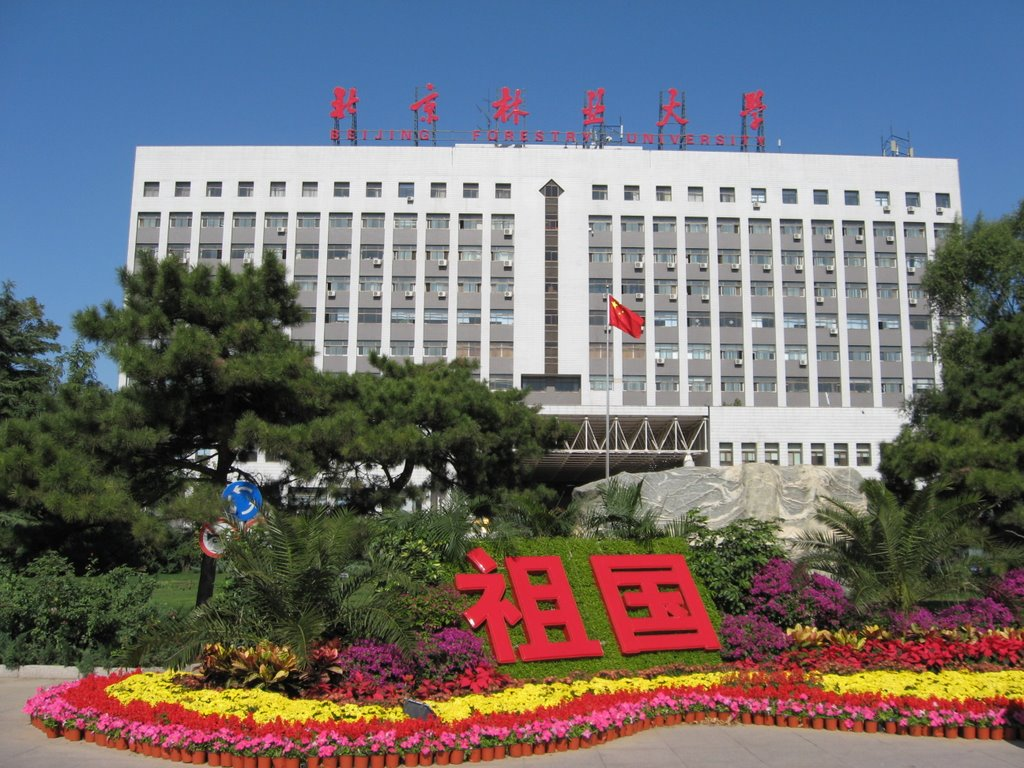
Beijing Forestry University, main entrance, October 2009

Beijing Forestry University (BFU, Chinese: 北京林业大学) is a public university located in Beijing, China. It is affiliated with the Ministry of Education, and co-sponsored by the Ministry of Education, the National Forestry and Grassland Administration, and the Beijing Municipal People's Government. The university is part of Project 211 and the Double First-Class Construction.

Beijing Forestry University (BFU) has a history that dates back to 1902 when the Forestry Section of the Agriculture Department of the Imperial University of Peking was established. Beijing Forestry University provides a wide range of courses such as Artificial Intelligence, Automation, Biology, Computer science, Economics, Electronics, Environmental Science, Forestry, Languages, Laws, Management, Mathematics, Physics and Psychology. To share its environmental friendly mind to the world, the university is now providing modern technologies for people to protect the earth. In 2011, it participated in the establishment of Beijing high-tech university alliance with 11 other universities with industry characteristics.

== History ==
Beijing Forestry University was founded as the Forestry Department of the Imperial University of Peking in 1902. In 1952 it became an institute and was renamed to Beijing Institute of Forestry. In 1985 it was renamed to Beijing Forestry University and focused on a wide range of new subjects including Electronics, Computer Science, Psychology and Economics. BFU has 14 schools providing more than 60 undergraduate programs, 120 postgraduate programs and 40 Ph.D. programs.

== Schools ==
The university has 14 schools:

- School of Art
- School of Biological Sciences and Biotechnology
- School of Economics and Management
- School of Environmental Science and Engineering
- School of Foreign Languages
- School of Forestry
- School of Humanities and Social Sciences
- School of Information Science and Technology
- School of Landscape Architecture
- School of Material Science and Technology
- School of Nature Conservation
- School of Science
- School of Soil and Water Conservation
- School of Technology

== Faculty ==
Since its establishment over 50 years ago, more than 30,000 Chinese and foreign students have graduated from Beijing Forestry University. Of that number 11 have attained the position of academician. The faculty consists of 956 full-time teachers including five academicians and 496 professors. While upholding traditional disciplines the university also established a large number of disciplines designed to meet the needs of society. The university consists of 15 schools; the graduate school, biological science and technology, landscape architecture, forestry, environmental science and engineering, soil and water conservation, industry, information science, material science and technology, science, conservation, economic management, humanities and social sciences, foreign languages, vocational training and continuing education.

The university features a computer center, computer network center, educational center, audio-visual teaching center, biological center, micro-technology center, forest-organism center and a tree farm for teaching and research (the Jiu Feng National Forest Park). Attached to the university are the Foreign-Language Training Center of the State Forestry Administration, the Research Center of Soil Control Technology of Loess Plateau in China and the Training Center of Desertification Control of China. BFU is a well-equipped institution, featuring the Central Building of Teaching, a gymnasium, laboratories, and a high-speed campus network. A computerized checking system exists for library books and the library building is the Imported Teaching Materials Center for forestry universities and colleges nationwide. Construction of a high-rise student apartment building and a new classroom building was completed in 2001.

In recent years, nearly 200 discoveries in scientific research received awards from national, provincial and ministerial authorities and more than 20 achievements of teaching were rewarded by the national and municipal governments. BFU is engaged in international academic exchanges and cooperation with more than 150 universities and research institutions in over 20 countries, providing opportunities for contacts between China and the outside world in the fields of forestry and environmental studies.

BFU provides an atmosphere for teaching and learning combining the acquisition of professional knowledge with an improvement of all-round abilities (with an emphasis on forging a rigorous, creative academic style). Systems of optional courses, subsidiary courses, course exemption, and bachelor-to-master continuing education have been established so students may develop according to their own interests and desires. The university also offers extracurricular activities to enrich campus life; these are organized by student societies and associations in fields including science and technology, art, sports, environmental protection, and politics. Some groups have become influential, including the Society of Scientific Exploration and Wilderness Survival and the Association of Beijing College Volunteers for Environmental Protection. The former received the Prize of the Earth, the top prize from the National Bureau of Environmental Protection. In recent years, BFU students of BFU won four consecutive prizes at the College Students' Landscape Gardening Architecture Design Competitions (sponsored by UNESCO and the International Association of Landscape Gardening Architects), the Golden Prize in International College Students' Architecture Design and prizes in garden-design competitions. Achievements were also earned in domestic competitions for scientific inventions, mathematics, and art.
