= Cooperation Consortium of Beijing High Technology Universities =

- 北京高科大学联盟
- Formation: 2011; 15 years ago
- Type: University alliance
- Headquarters: Changping, Beijing
- Members: 12 universities

Chinese name
- Simplified Chinese: 北京高科大学联盟
- Traditional Chinese: 北京高科大學聯盟
Transcriptions
Standard Mandarin
- Hanyu Pinyin: Běijīng Gāokē Dàxué Liánméng

The Cooperation Consortium of Beijing High Technology Universities is an inter-university conference. Founded in 2011, the consortium now have 12 member universities, all of which are well-known polytechnic research universities in China.

The 12 member schools have good reputations in a range of fields, such as information technology, electric engineering, petroleum engineering, energy engineering, material science, transport, telecommunication, nuclear physics, chemical engineering, environmental science, geology, forestry, shipbuilding and mining, which are key disciplines in industry and economy. The objective of this university alliance is to be the research and innovation leaders of those disciplines in China.

Currently, the 12 members of Beijing Tech have totally 16 national key laboratories, 14 national laboratories of engineering and 14 "Project 111" bases. They have been issued more than 300 national-level awards. 8 out of 12 member schools are located in Beijing, while the Yanshan University is located in Qinhuangdao; the Xidian University (aka Xi'an Electrical Technology University) is in Xi'an; the Harbin Engineering University is in Harbin.

== Members ==
- Beijing University of Chemical Technology
- Beijing Jiaotong University
- University of Science & Technology Beijing
- Beijing Forestry University
- Yanshan University
- Beijing University of Posts and Telecommunications
- Harbin Engineering University
- Xi'an Electrical Technology University
- China University of Geosciences (Beijing)
- China University of Mining & Technology (Beijing)
- China University of Petroleum (Beijing)
- North China Electric Power University - Beijing Campus
