= Beijing University of Chemical Technology =

Public university in Beijing, China

Coordinates: 39°58′08″N 116°24′55″E

- 北京化工大学
- Other names: BUCT, Běihuà, Huàdà
- Motto: Chinese: 宏德博学 化育天工
- Motto in English: Integrity, Knowledge, Sharing and Works
- Type: Public
- Established: 1958; 68 years ago
- Affiliations: Beijing Tech; Sino-Spanish University Alliance (SSU)
- President: Gong Jinlong (巩金龙)
- Faculty: 1,711
- Undergraduates: 12,667
- Postgraduates: 5,130
- Location: Beijing, China
- Campus: Urban, 3 campuses
- Website: english.buct.edu.cn

Chinese name
- Simplified Chinese: 北京化工大学
- Traditional Chinese: 北京化工大學
Transcriptions
Standard Mandarin
- Hanyu Pinyin: Běijīng Huàgōng Dàxué

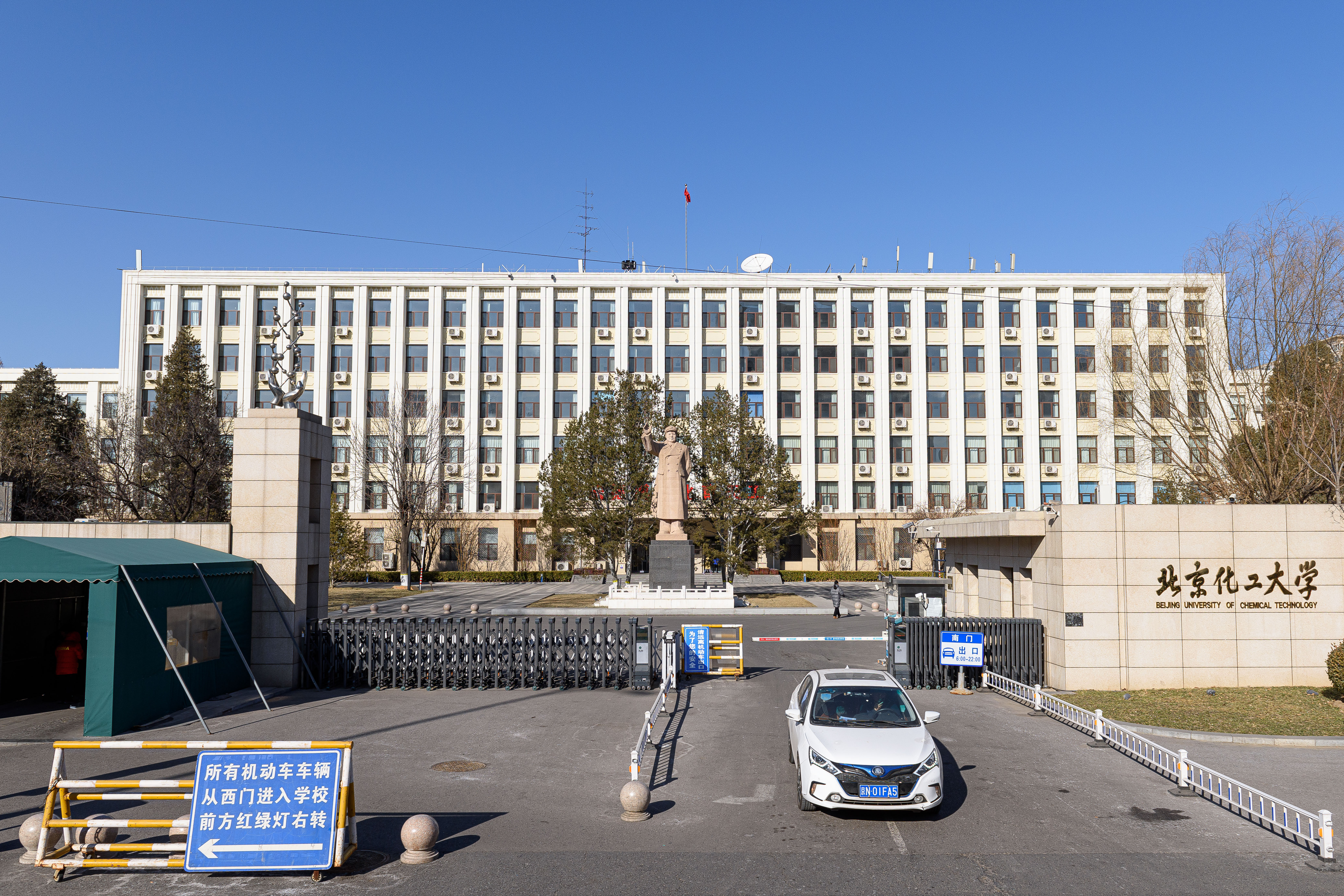
Entrance of the Beijing University of Chemical Technology

The Beijing University of Chemical Technology (BUCT, Chinese: 北京化工大学; lit. 'Beijing Chemical Industry University') is a public university in Chaoyang, Beijing, China. It was founded in 1958 and is affiliated with the Ministry of Education of China. The university is part of Project 211 and the Double First-Class Construction.

== Campus ==
Covering an area of 64.4 hectares, the university is composed of three campuses:

- East campus (headquarters): located on the eastern section of the North Third Ring Road, southeast of the Asian Games Village.
- West campus: On the central section of the West Third Ring Road.
- North campus: locates in Changping, near Lake Shisanling. Most of the North campus had been sold to China University of Petroleum while the remaining will be the dormitory for the staff, since the new North campus, a.k.a. Nankou campus, is a little bit more far from the East campus and requires additional dorm for staff.
- Nankou campus: locates in Changping, about 5 km from the Changping Xishankou station of Beijing Subway Changping line. Near the Institute of Nuclear Energy Technology, Tsinghua University.

== Faculty ==
BUCT consists of 14 colleges: Chemical Engineering, Materials Science and Engineering, Mechanical and Electrical Engineering, Information Science and Technology, Economic Management, Science, Humanities and Law, Life Science and Technology and Further Education and Vocational Education. There are approximately 1800 staff members on campus and 12,000 students.

== Rankings and reputations ==
Beijing University of Chemical Technology is listed as one of the top 450 global universities in the World University Rankings.

Beijing University of Chemical Technology is ranked as one of the world's top research institutions in "Chemical Engineering". As of 2022, BUCT ranked 6th globally in the Academic Ranking of World Universities (ARWU) for "Chemical Engineering".

University rankings

Global – Overall
- ARWU World: 201-300 (2023)
- CWUR World: 422 (2023)
- CWTS World: 237 (2023)
- QS World: =697 (2026)
- USNWR Global: 421 (2023)

Regional – Overall
- CWTS Asia: 94 (2023)
- QS Asia: =282 (2025)
- USNWR Asia: 82 (2023)

National – Overall
- BCUR National: 64 (2023)
- USNWR National: 41 (2023)

== Notable alumni ==
- Zhou Xiaochuan - Governor of the People's Bank of China, in charge of the monetary policy of the People's Republic of China.
- He Guoqiang - Member of Politburo Standing Committee of the Chinese Communist Party
- Cheng Wei - founder of Didi Chuxing
