= North China Electric Power University =

Public university in Beijing, China

- 华北电力大学
- Former names: Beijing Power Engineering and Electronics Institute; Beijing Institute of Electric Power; North China Institute of Electric Power
- Motto: 团结 勤奋 求实 创新
- Motto in English: United, Diligent, Realistic, Innovative
- Type: Public
- Established: 1958; 68 years ago
- Affiliations: Beijing Tech; Sino-Spanish University Alliance (SSU)
- President: Yang Yongping
- Location: Beijing, China; 40°05′19″N 116°18′15″E
- Campus: Urban (Baoding campus) Suburban (Beijing Changping campus)
- Colors: Blue, Red and White
- Website: ncepu.edu.cn

Chinese name
- Simplified Chinese: 华北电力大学
- Traditional Chinese: 華北電力大學
Transcriptions
Standard Mandarin
- Hanyu Pinyin: Huáběi Diànlì Dàxué

North China Electric Power University (NCEPU; 华北电力大学) is a public university in Beijing, China. It is affiliated with the Ministry of Education, and co-sponsored by the Ministry of Education, the China Electricity Council, and a council composed of 12 giant state-owned power corporations. The university is part of Project 211 and the Double First-Class Construction.

The university specializes in polytechnic disciplines. The main campus is located in Beijing, and it has a branch campus in Baoding, Hebei Province. There are about 3,000 full-time faculty and staff, 20,000 undergraduates and 7,000 graduate students in this university.

== Introduction ==
North China Electric Power University is affiliated with the Ministry of Education of China, and it is officially listed as one of the Double First Class University Plan, former Project 211 universities as well as a "Predominant Discipline Innovation Platform". At present, NCEPU is a key university jointly constructed by the Ministry of Education and the University Council, which is composed of State Grid Corporation of China, China Southern Power Grid Co., Ltd., China Huaneng Group, China Datang Corporation, China Huadian Corporation, China Guodian Corporation and China Power Investment Corporation.

== History ==
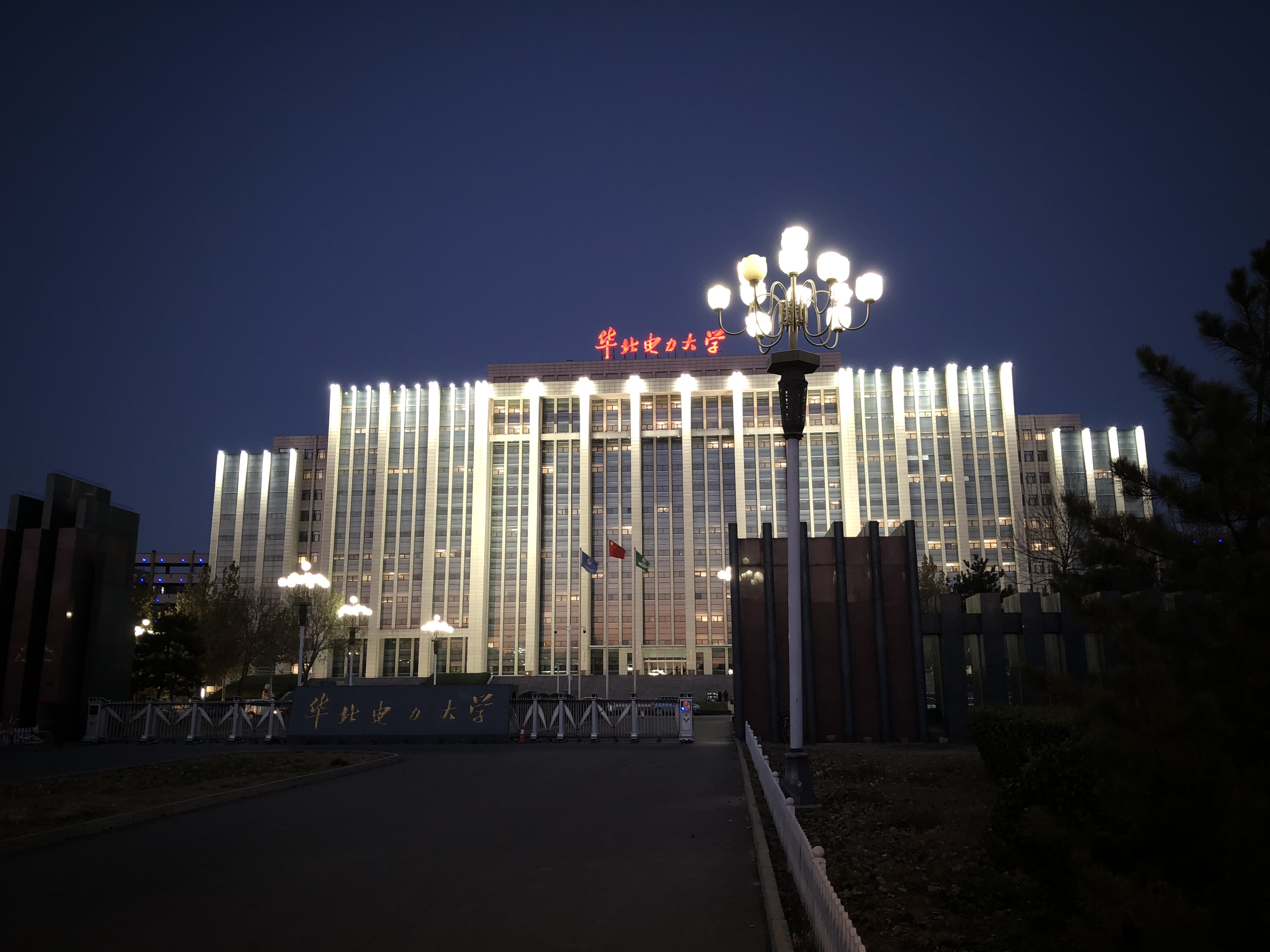
Beijing campus, North China Electric Power University

The university was established as the Beijing Institute of Electric Power in 1958. It was later renamed the North China Institute of Electric Power when its location was moved to Baoding, Hebei province in 1970. When the school merged with the Beijing Power Engineering and Electronics Institute in 1995, it was given its present name. In 2006, the university relocated its main campus back to Beijing. It still operates a branch campus in Baoding.

A close neighbour of Badaling Expressway, the main campus of North China Electric Power University is now located in Zhuxinzhuang, Changping District, Beijing. It is found in beautiful surroundings.

As one of the key universities in China with a history of more than 40 years, this university has been fostering talents in the areas of engineering technology, management, economics and the social sciences. There are more than 8,500 students with over 600 graduate and doctoral students.

== Administration ==
=== Departments ===
It has the following departments:

- Department of Mathematical and Physics Science
- Department of Electric Power Engineering
- Department of Thermal Power Engineering
- Department of Information Engineering
- Department of Automation
- Department of Computer Science and Technology
- Department of Economics and Trade
- Department of Finance and Accounting
- Department of Law and Politics
- Department of Foreign Languages

=== Schools ===
It has the following Schools:

- Electrical and Electronic Engineering School
- Energy and Power Engineering School
- Renewable Energy School
- Nuclear Science and Engineering School
- Economics and Management School
- School of Control and Computer Engineering
- Environment Engineering and Science School
- Human and Social Science School
- Mathematical and Physical Science School
- Foreign Language School
- Science and Technology School

There is one centre for post-doctoral studies . The university offers one post-doctoral project program, 7 doctoral programs, 17 master's degree programs and 24 bachelor's degree programs. It has been authorised to admit overseas students. Covering a floor space of 11,000 square metres (120,000 sq ft), the library has a collection of over a one million volumes.

There are five key ministerial subjects, namely power system and its automation, power plant thermal power engineering, theoretical electric engineering, industrial automation and technological economics. Meanwhile, there are three key ministerial laboratories called Power System Intelligence Protection and Control, Industrial Process Simulation and Control, State Monitoring and Fault Diagnosis in Electric Device.

== Interscholastic relations ==
The university has set up cooperative relations with universities and institutes in more than 20 countries and regions such as Britain, United States, France, Russia, Japan and Taiwan. It offers exchange opportunities to students to study at universities in other countries, such as Illinois Tech, Purdue, UC Berkeley, the University of Bath and University of Strathclyde, etc.

This university is also the starting member of Cooperation Consortium of Beijing High Technology Universities, which is a major academic interschool association in northern China.
