= University of Science and Technology Beijing =

Public university in Beijing, China

Coordinates: 39°59′25″N 116°21′26″E

- 北京科技大学
- Former names: Beijing Steel and Iron Institute (北京钢铁学院)
- Motto: 求实鼎新
- Motto in English: Seeking Truth and Endorsing Innovation
- Type: Public
- Established: 1952; 74 years ago
- Affiliations: Beijing Tech; Sino-Spanish University Alliance (SSU)
- Chancellor: WU Guilong (武贵龙)
- President: YANG Renshu (杨仁树)
- Undergraduates: 13,934 (2024)
- Postgraduates: 13,377 (2024)
- Location: Beijing, China
- Campus: Urban 803,900 square meters
- Nickname: Seashell (贝壳)
- Website: www.ustb.edu.cn/ (in Chinese) en.ustb.edu.cn/ (in English)

Chinese name
- Simplified Chinese: 北京科技大学
- Traditional Chinese: 北京科技大學
Transcriptions
Standard Mandarin
- Hanyu Pinyin: Běijīng Kējì Dàxúe
- Wade–Giles: Pei-ching K'o-chi Ta-hsüeh

Alternative Chinese name
- Simplified Chinese: 北京钢铁学院
- Traditional Chinese: 北京鋼鐵學院
Transcriptions
Standard Mandarin
- Hanyu Pinyin: Běijīng Gāngtiě Xuéyuàn
- Wade–Giles: Pei-ching Kang-t'ieh Hsüeh-yüan

Beijing Industrial Institute of Steel and Iron
- Simplified Chinese: 北京钢铁工业学院
- Traditional Chinese: 北京鋼鐵工業學院
Transcriptions
Standard Mandarin
- Hanyu Pinyin: Běijīng Gāngtiěgōngyè Xuéyuàn
- Wade–Giles: Pei-ching Kang-t'ieh-kung-yeh Hsüeh-yüan

The University of Science and Technology Beijing (USTB; 北京科技大学) is a public university in Haidian, Beijing, China. It is affiliated with the Ministry of Education. The university is part of Project 211 and the Double First-Class Construction. The university was formerly known as Beijing Steel and Iron Institute (北京钢铁学院) before 1988.

== History ==
The university was founded in 1952 from the combination of five former colleges. It known then as the Beijing Industrial Institute of Steel and Iron (北京钢铁工业学院). It was renamed as Beijing Steel and Iron Institute (北京钢铁学院) in 1960. The University of Science and Technology Beijing name was not adopted until 1988.

In 1997, USTB was selected into the first tier of universities for China's 211 Project (involved with the development of 100 world class universities in the 21st century for China).

Beijing Industrial Institute of Steel and Iron; 1952
Beijing Steel and Iron Institute; 1960
University of Science and Technology Beijing; 1988

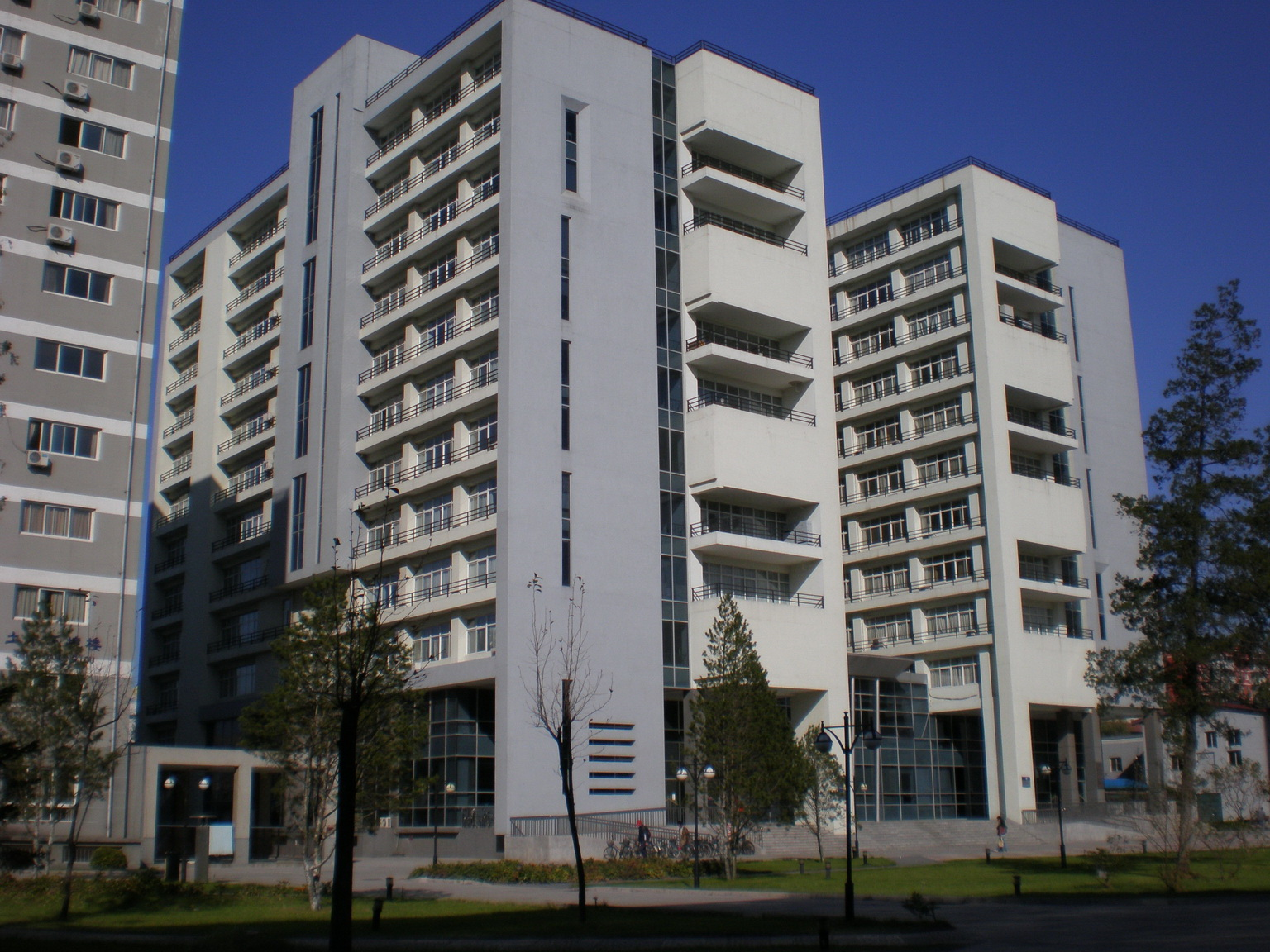
Mechanical and Information Engineering Building

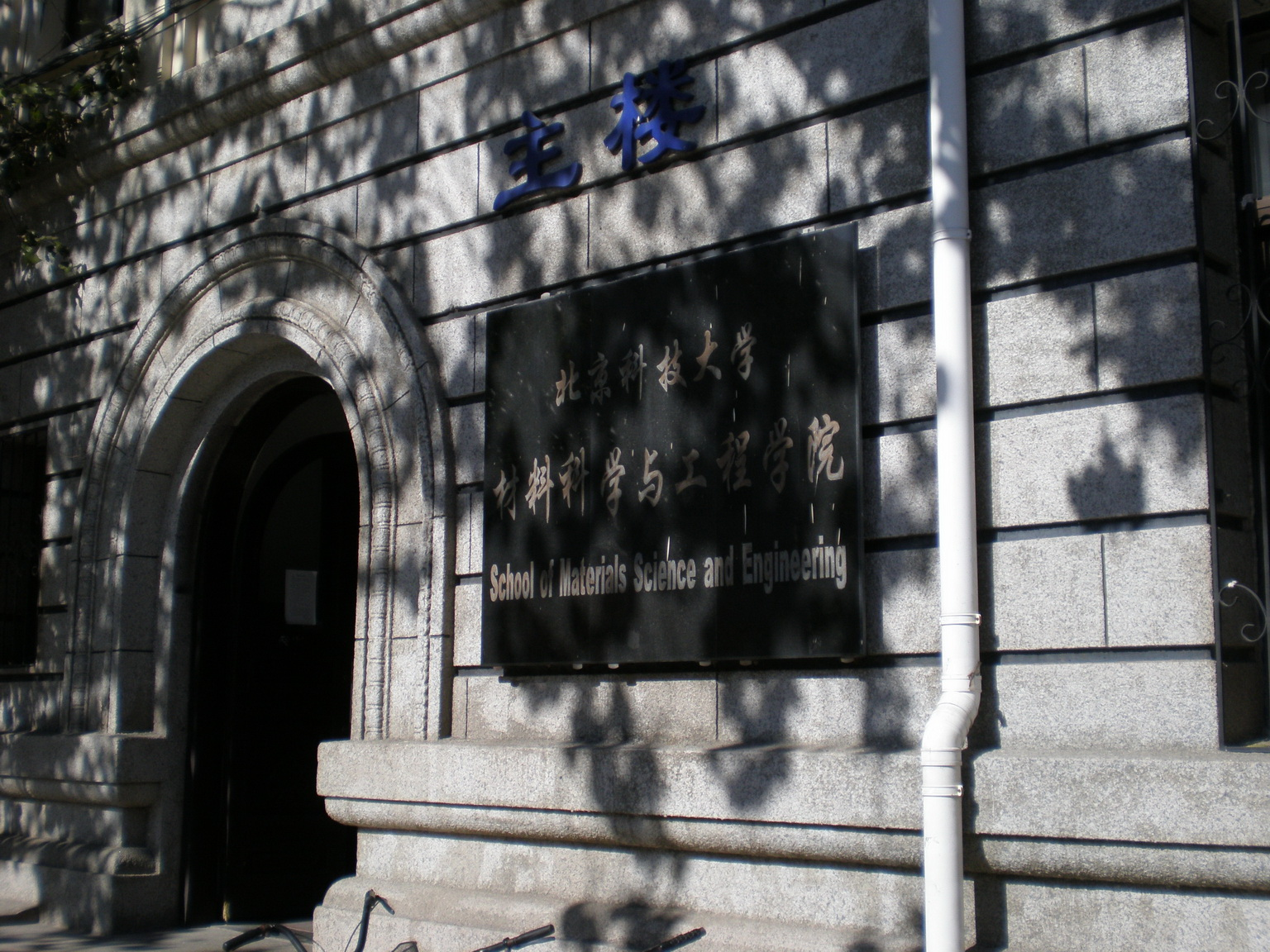
Main building entrance, i.e. the School of Materials Science and Engineering

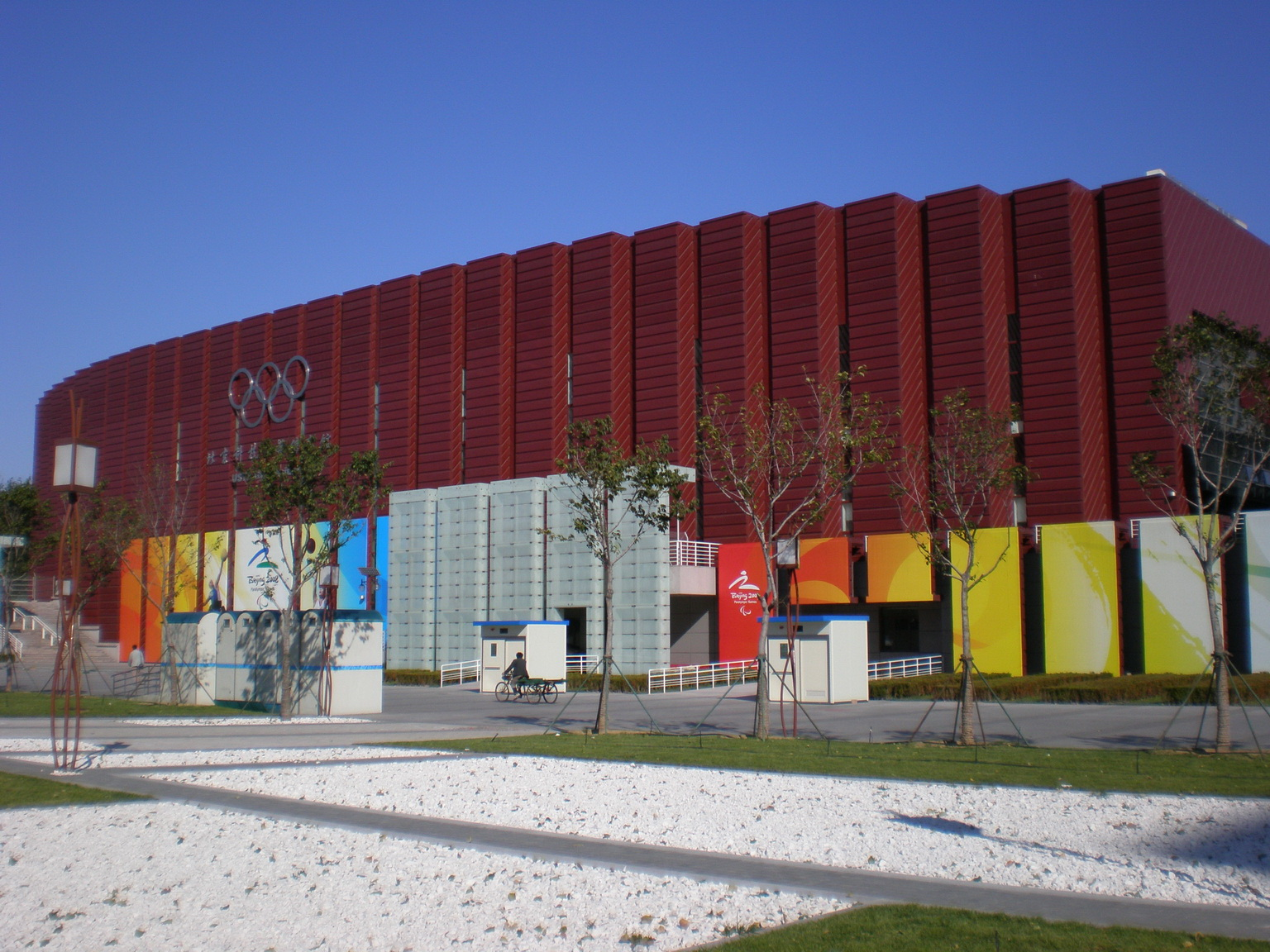
USTB Gymnasium

== Schools and departments ==
USTB consists of 38 schools, provides 48 undergraduate programs, 121 master programs, 73 doctoral programs and 16 postdoctoral research fields. The University has large departments in physics, chemistry, engineering, economics, and English. One of the largest departments is the Department of Materials Science and Engineering. The University has about 14,000 undergraduate students and about 14,000 PhD and graduate students. The Department of Materials Science and Engineering has about 500 students in the undergraduate program and about 200 students in various graduate and PhD programs. Owing to its origin as a former iron and steel university the university has one of the strongest departments in the field of materials science with strong international visibility and reputation particularly in the field of physical metallurgy and metal physics of the microstructures of structural and functional materials.

=== Schools & Institutes ===
- School of Civil and Resources Engineering
- School of Energy and Environment
- School of Metallurgical and Ecological Engineering
- School of Materials Science and Engineering

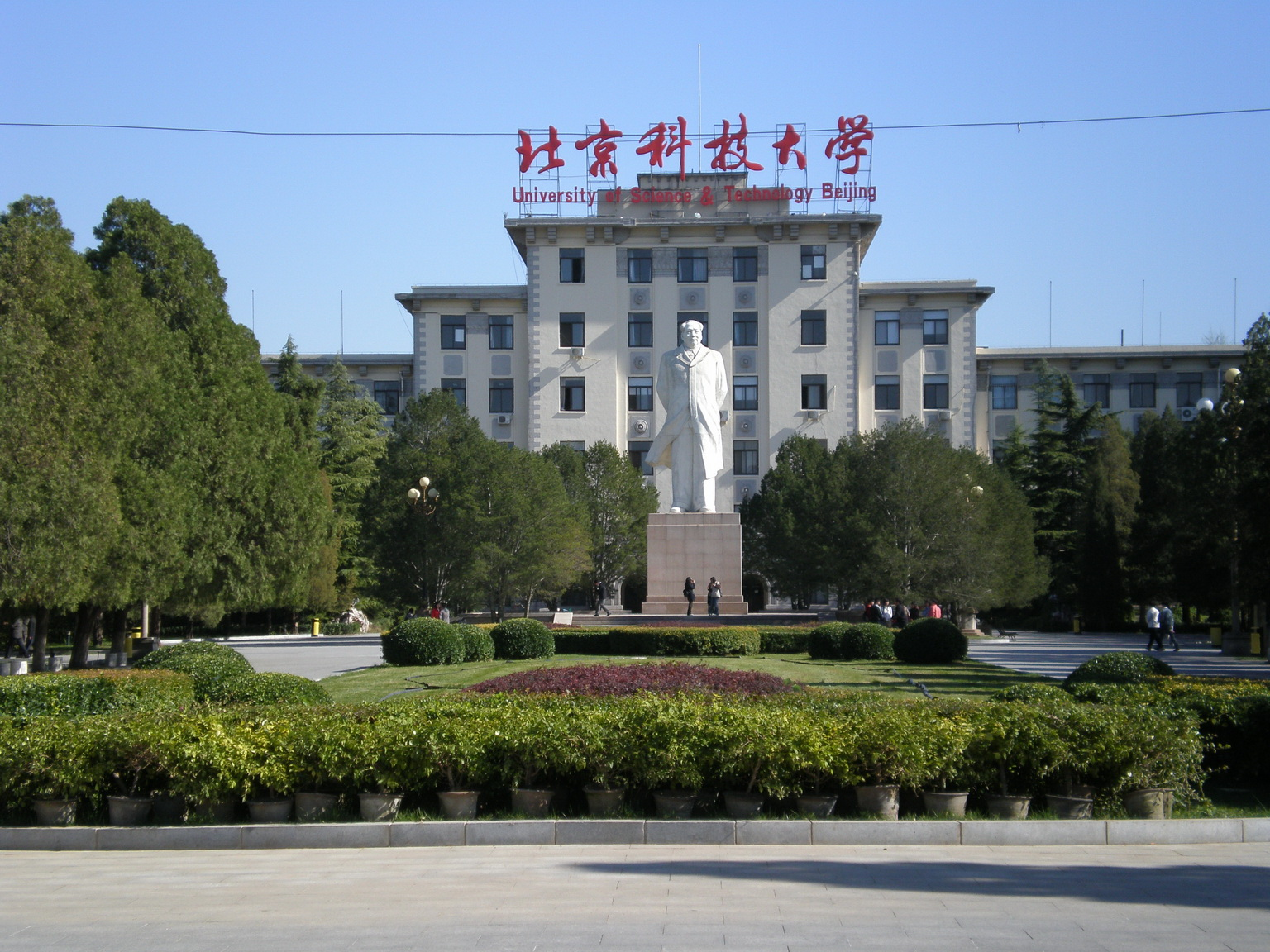
USTB West Gate

- School of Mechanical Engineering
- School of Automation and Electrical Engineering
- School of Computer and Communication Engineering
- Dongling School of Economics and Management
- School of Humanities and Social Sciences
- Duoism Institute
- School of Mathematics and Physics
- School of Chemical and Biological Engineering
- School of Foreign Studies
- School of Marxism
- Tianjin School
- Graduate School
- State Key Laboratory for Advanced Metals and Materials
- State Key Laboratory of Advanced Metallurgy
- National Center for Materials Service Safety
- Collaborative Innovation Center of Steel Technology
- Institute for Advanced Materials and Technology
- Institute for Cultural Heritage and History of Science and Technology
- Institute of Artificial Intelligence
- Institute of Engineering and Technology
- Institute for Multidisciplinary Innovation

== Campus ==
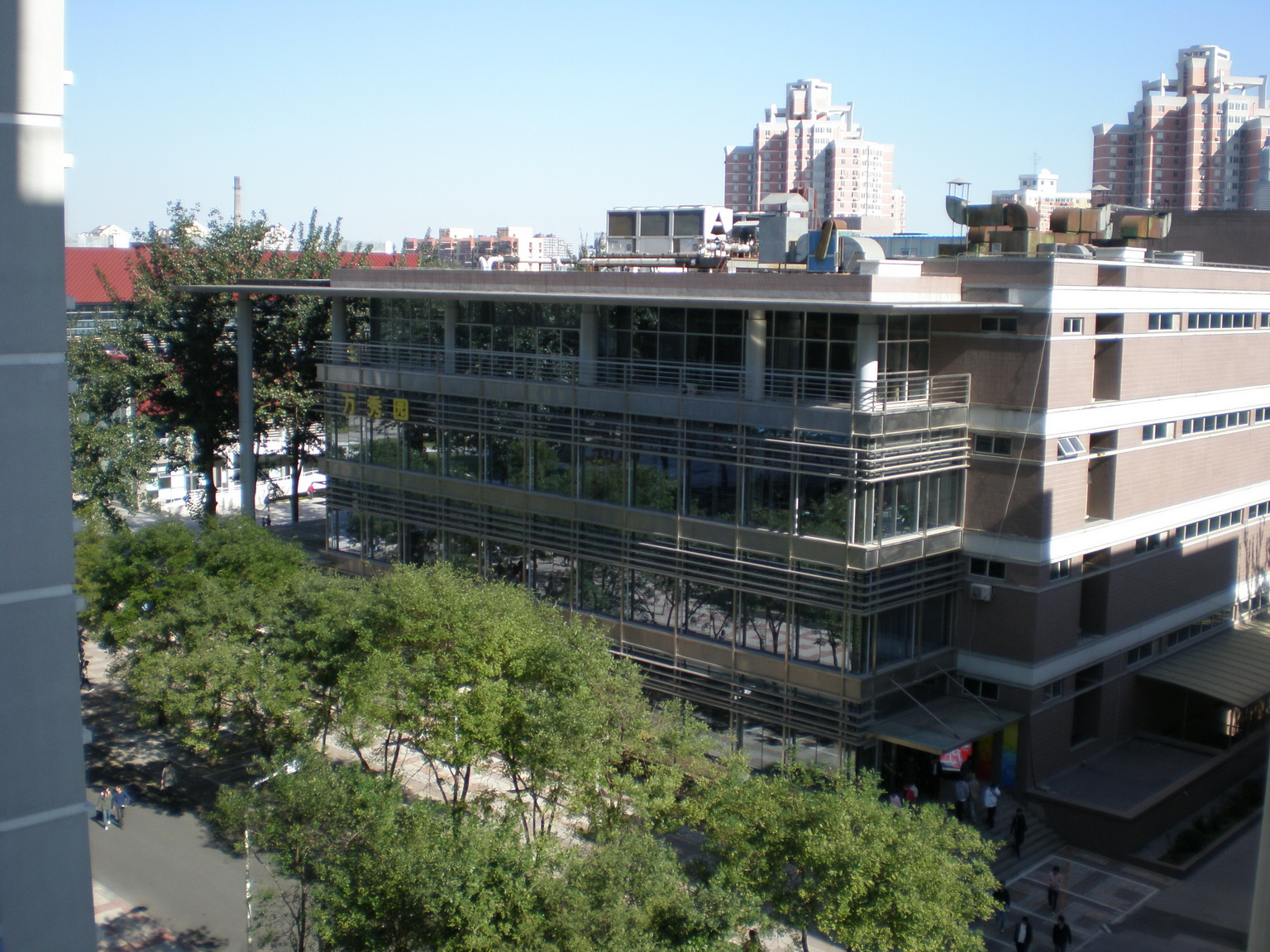
Wanxiuyuan cafeteria (万秀园), one of the two major canteens in USTB

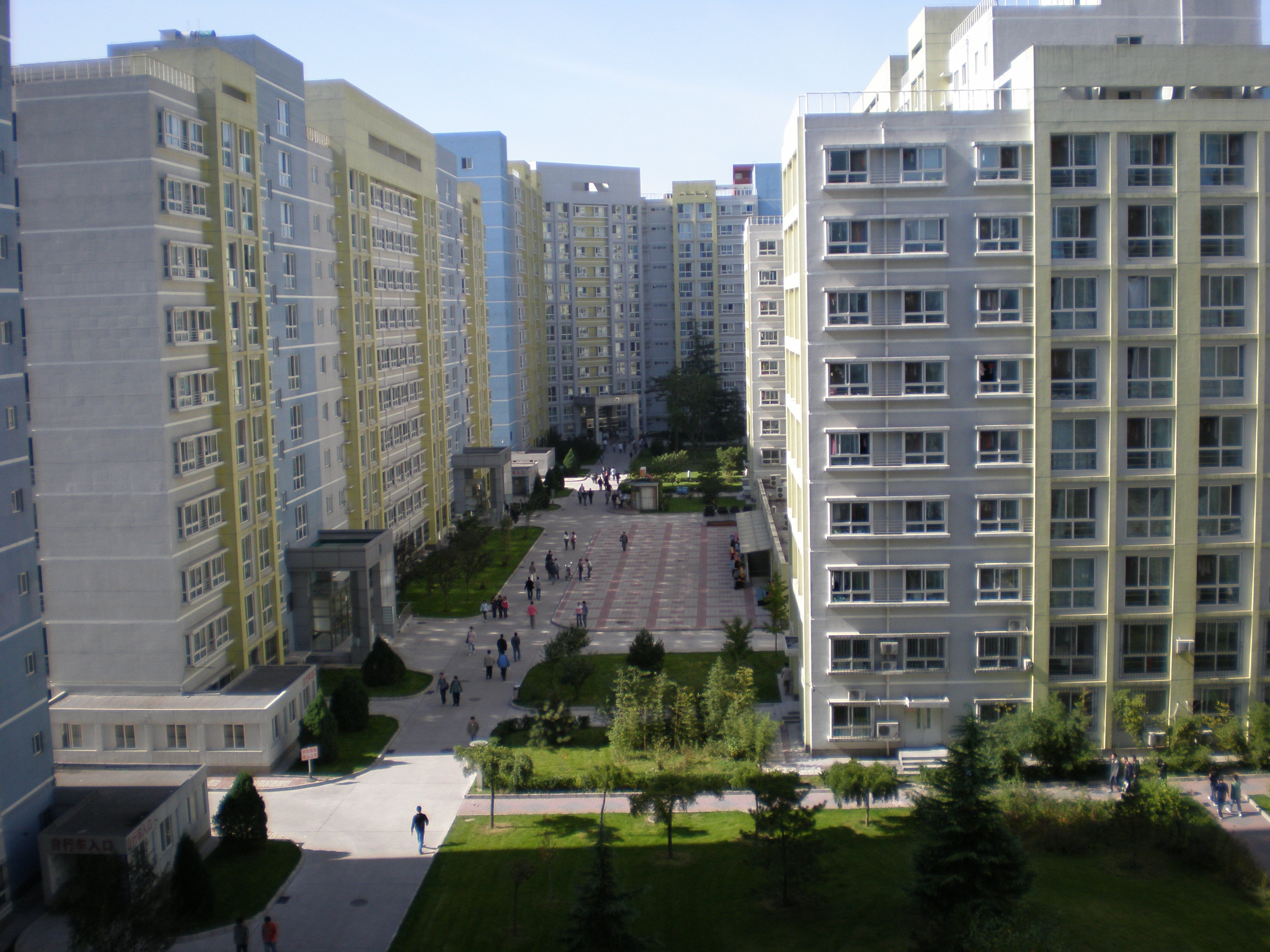
Students' dormitories in the south of the campus

USTB total area 803,900 m^{2} is located in Haidian District, Beijing, facing Fourth Ring Road, where most key institutions of higher learning are gathered. The USTB Gymnasium for 2008 Summer Olympics is located on the east part of the campus. It is one of the four competition gymnasiums in Beijing's universities, which provided places for competition items like judo and taekwondo in the 29th Olympic Games, as well as competition items like wheelchair basketball and wheelchair rugby in the 13th Paralympic Games. The USTB provides its students with newly built dormitories, completed in 2005. After the Olympic Games, the main part of the gymnasium is provided as the place for indoor physical education, fitness training, athletic contests and artistic performances. The comprehensive gymnasium is provided as the place for swimming teaching and aquatic park.

== International students ==
USTB is an institution involving the Chinese Government Scholarship Program and has been accepting the international students since 1954. More than two thousands of students from 74 countries and regions have been studying and doing research work in the university.

== Rankings and reputation ==
University rankings
BCUR National	Domestic	35
Wu Shulian National	Domestic	45
QS National	General	30
QS Asia (Asia version)	General	=153
ARWU World	Research	201–300
QS World	General	=480
USNWR World	General	=357

The University of Science and Technology Beijing is listed as one of the top 500 global universities in several world university rankings such as the QS World University Rankings, the Academic Ranking of World Universities (ARWU), the U.S. News & World Report Best Global University Ranking, the Center for World University Rankings, and the CWTS Leiden Ranking.

As of 2023, the Academic Ranking of World Universities, also known as the "Shanghai Ranking", placed USTB 201-300 in the world. The U.S. News & World Report ranked USTB 381th globally and 89th in Asia in its 2024 Best Global Universities Rankings.

The university is considered one of the major research institutions for Engineering in Beijing. USTB's metallurgy and materials science programmes are highly regarded in China. Since 2018, USTB has been ranked the best globally in the Academic Ranking of World Universities (ARWU) for "Metallurgical Engineering".

The Autonomous Vehicle Metaverse Project "Jiu Lu" by USTB was launched. Two papers from the USTB SCCE were selected as excellent papers by the China Association for Science and Technology. 23 achievements by USTB won the 2022 China Metallurgical Science and Technology Award. Five achievements of USTB won the State Science and Technology Awards.

== Notable alumni ==
- Lu Zhengyao, billionaire businessman, chairman of Luckin Coffee
- Luo Gan
- Liu Qi
- Xu Kuangdi
- Huang Mengfu
- Zhang Zilin
- Ganggang Hu Guidice
