= Yanshan University =

Public university in Hebei, China

Coordinates: 39°54′19.1″N 119°32′22.541″E

Yanshan University YSU
- 燕山大学
- Established: 1920; 106 years ago
- Affiliations: Beijing Tech; CDIO Initiative
- Budget: CN¥ 2.013 billion (2023)
- President: Zhao Dingxuan (赵丁选)
- Academic staff: 2,200
- Total staff: 3,200
- Students: 40,000
- Location: Qinhuangdao, Hebei
- Campus: 820 acres; Urban
- Colors: Yanshan Blue
- Website: www.ysu.edu.cn

Chinese name
- Simplified Chinese: 燕山大学
- Traditional Chinese: 燕山大學
Transcriptions
Standard Mandarin
- Hanyu Pinyin: Yànshān Dàxué

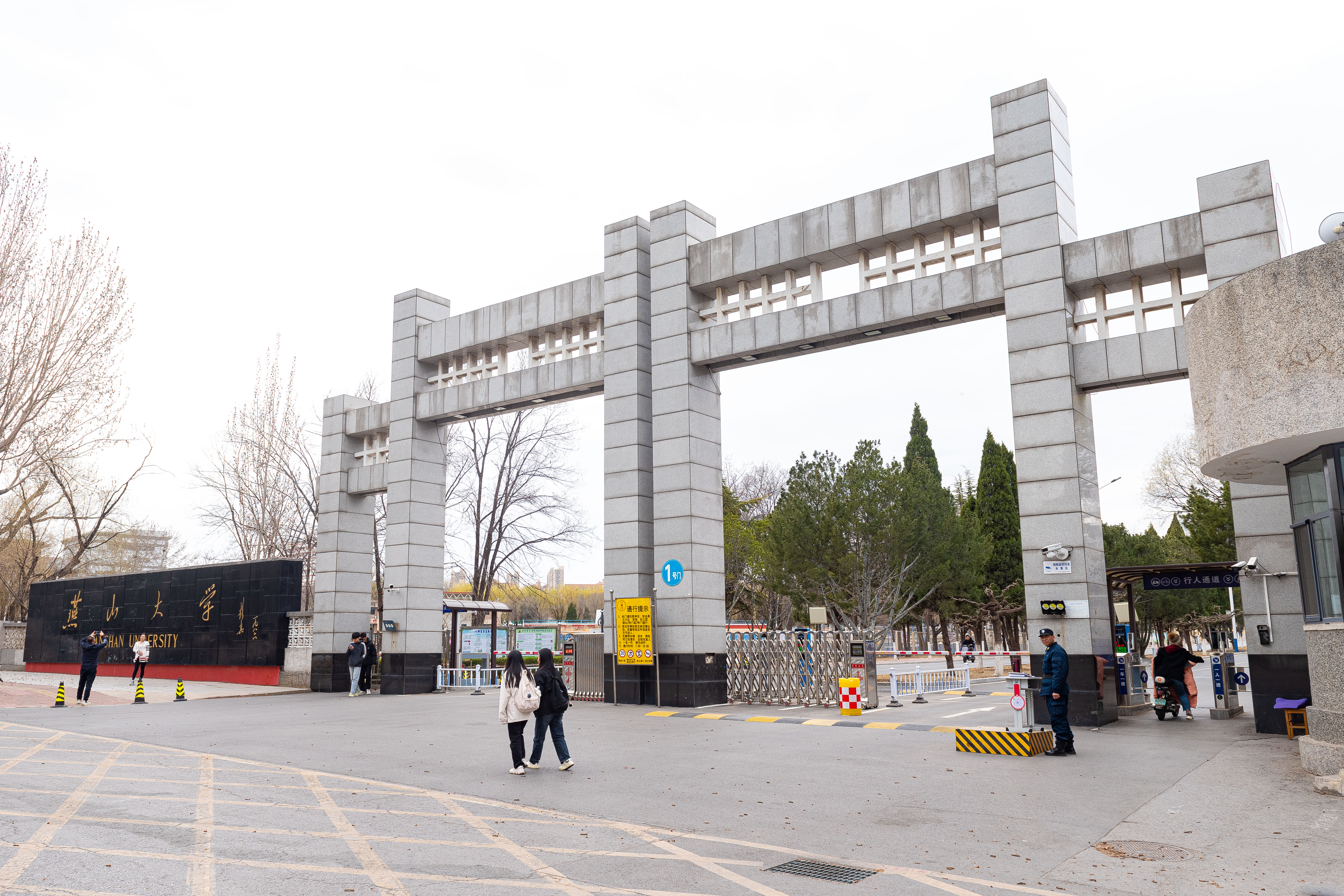
East campus

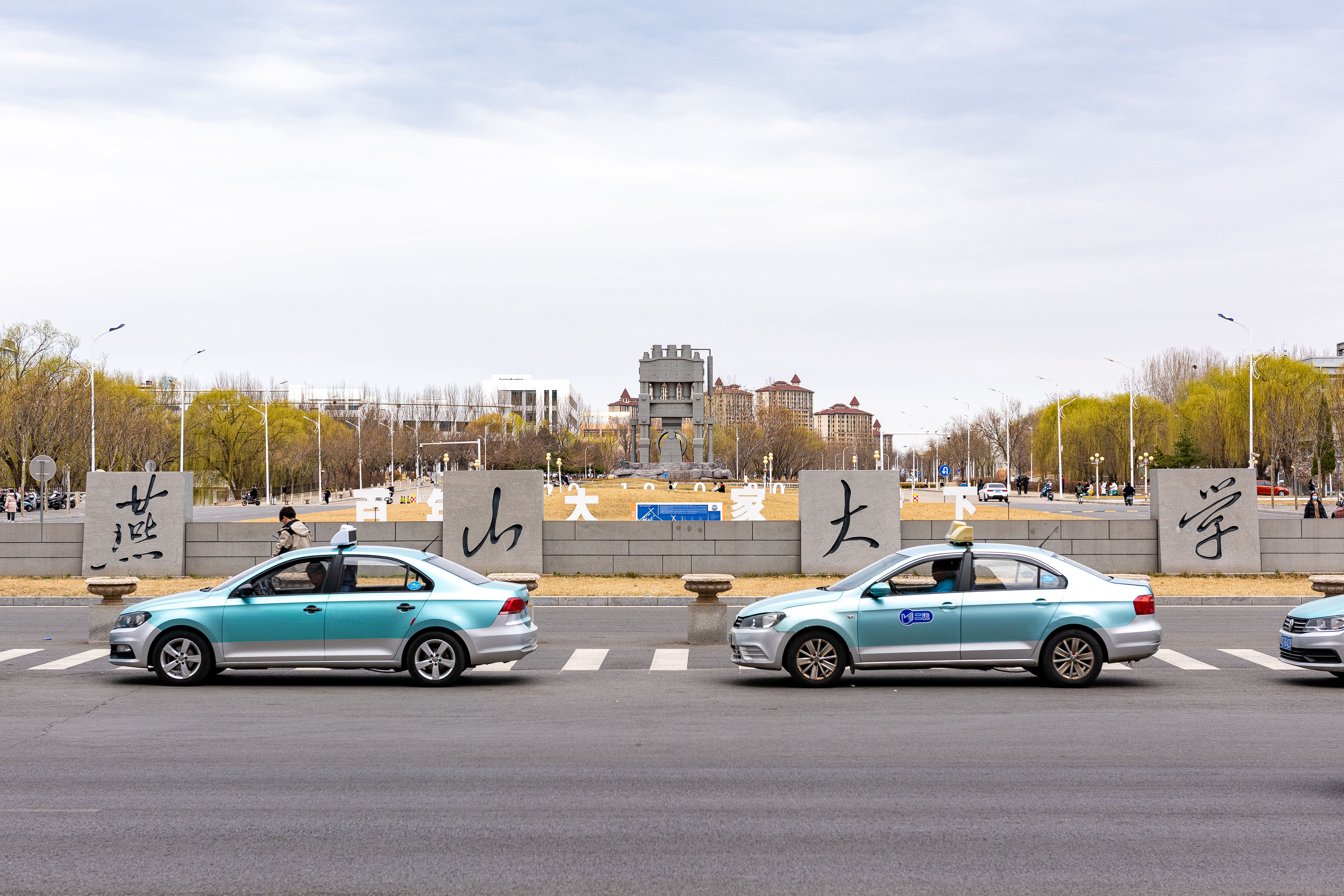
West campus

Yanshan University (燕山大学) is a provincial public university in Qinhuangdao, Hebei, China. It is affiliated with the Province of Hebei.

In 2023, it has a student population of 40,000 and a staff population of 3,200 (2,058 are teachers, including 568 professors and 678 associate professors).

== History ==
=== Harbin Institute of Technology (HIT) (1920-1960) ===
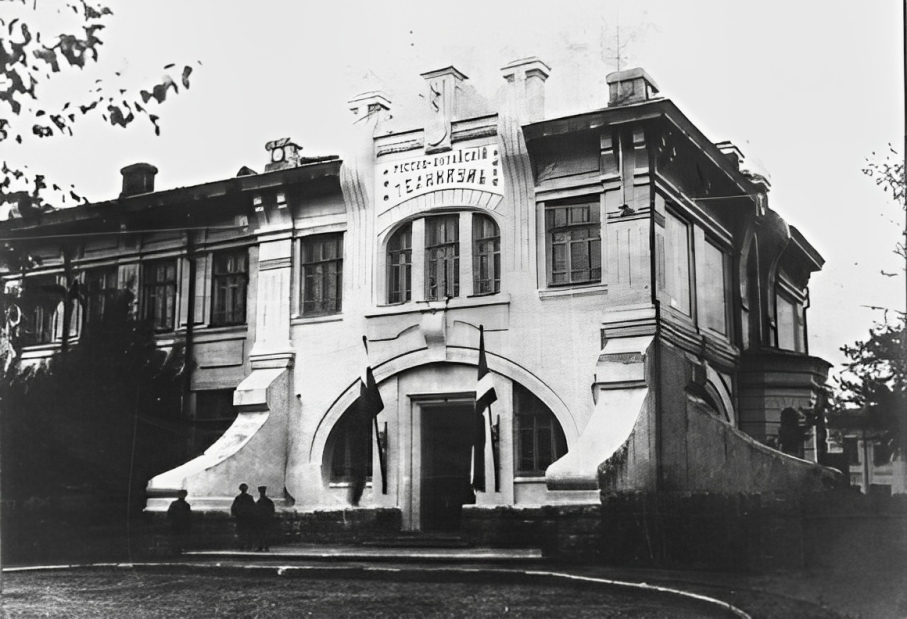
Harbin Institute of Technology (Harbin Sino-Russian Industrial School) in 1920

The origin of Yanshan University can be traced back to the Harbin Institute of Technology (Harbin Sino-Russian Industrial School), founded in 1920. In 1958, the Department of Heavy Machinery of Harbin Institute of Technology and its related specialties moved to the strategic industrial town of Fulaerji, Qiqihar in northeast China's Heilongjiang Province and was renamed the School of Heavy Machinery of the Harbin Institute of Technology.

=== Northeast Heavy Machinery Institute (1960-1997) ===
The School of Heavy Machinery of the Harbin Institute of Technology gained independence in 1960 and was renamed as the Northeast Heavy Machinery Institute. Later, in 1961, it merged with the Shenyang College of Heavy Machinery and the Lanzhou Petroleum Industry Institute. In 1978, it was recognized as one of the 88 key national institutions for higher education. From 1984 onwards, some of the departments and staff of the Northeast Heavy Machinery Institute started moving southward to Qinhuangdao, a coastal city in Hebei Province.

=== Yanshan University (1997~present) ===
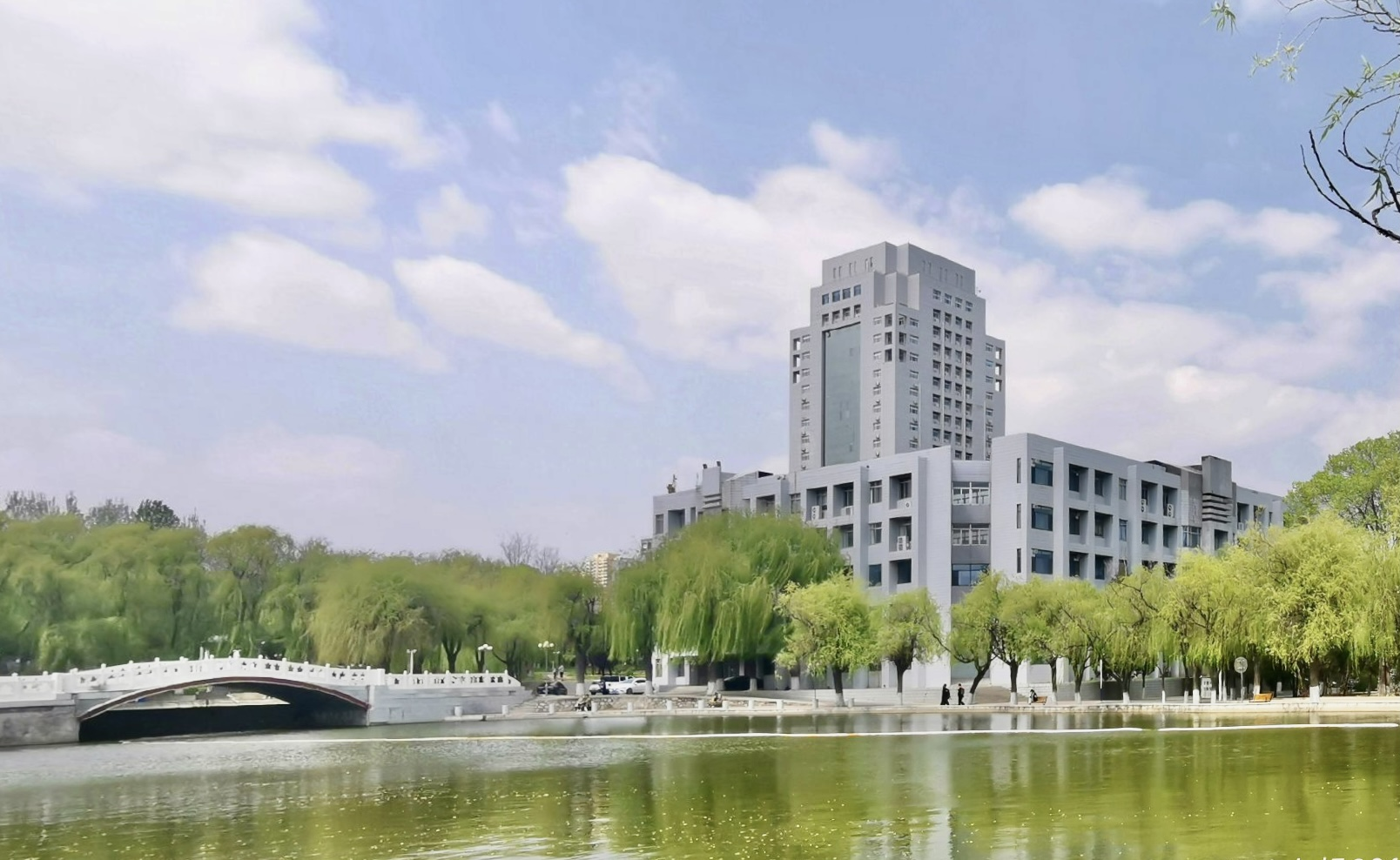
Yanshan University Campus in 2022

The Northeast Heavy Machinery Institute completely migrated to Qinhuangdao in 1997. It was accredited by the former State Education Commission to adopt the present name of Yanshan University.

== Academics ==
=== Research ===
In the 2018 "World Robot Contest-Inclusive Robot Challenge" sponsored by the National Natural Science Foundation of China, the scientific research team of YSU won the first prize.

In 2023, based on the volume and citations on published research papers, engineering, materials science, chemistry, and computer science of YSU are among the top 1% of ESI (Essential Science Indicators by Clarivate) rankings worldwide.

YSU played a role in the design and production of Comac C919, as well as contributing to the design of the Shenzhou spacecraft, the Chinese high-speed rail, and the commissioning and design of FAST(Five-hundred-meter Aperture Spherical Telescope).

=== Academic Journals Managed by YSU ===
Until 2022, there are two academic journals managed by YSU:

- Journal of Yanshan University
- Journal of Yanshan University (Philosophy and Social Science)

== Education Quality ==
Until 2023, Yanshan University has a student population of 40,000 and a total staff population of 3,200 (2,058 are teachers, including 568 professors and 678 associate professors). The university has 200 doctoral advisors.

=== World Rankings ===
World Rankings of Yanshan University Released by Different Organizations
	Year	Ranking
Shanghai Ranking (Academic Ranking of World Universities)	2021	901
Shanghai Ranking (Academic Ranking of World Universities)	2022	▲801
Shanghai Ranking (Academic Ranking of World Universities)	2023	▲801
Best Global Universities Rankings (U.S. News & World Report)	2021	1360
Best Global Universities Rankings (U.S. News & World Report)	2022	▲1358
Best Global Universities Rankings (U.S. News & World Report)	2023	▼1407
World University Rankings (Times Higher Education)	2021	1001
World University Rankings (Times Higher Education)	2022	▼1201
World University Rankings (Times Higher Education)	2023	▼1501

=== Domestic Ranking ===
In the fourth round of national discipline evaluation of China, eight disciplines achieved grades of B or higher, with mechanical engineering earning a grade of A and ranking in the top 10% nationwide. Materials science and engineering received a grade of B+ and ranked in the top 20% nationwide.

== Main Faculties ==
=== School of Electrical Engineering ===
In 2023, the School of Electrical Engineering has 243 staff and faculty members, of which 69 are professors. The school has 4,808 students (including 237 Ph.D. students, 1,712 postgraduates and 2,830 undergraduates).

The school consists of three postdoctoral research stations:

- Control Science and Engineering
- Instrument Science and technology
- Electrical engineering

Information of School of Electrical Engineering
Item	Number
First-level disciplines conferring doctoral degrees	3
Second-level disciplines conferring doctoral degrees	16
Key Laboratories of Hebei Province	3
National Experimental Teaching Demonstration Center	1
Hebei undergraduate education innovation highland	1

=== School of Information Science and Engineering (School of Software Engineering) ===
In 2023, the school consists of 197 staff members, with 150 being teachers, including 58 professors, 50 associate professors. The school has 140 doctoral candidates, 1,248 master's degree candidates, and 3,112 undergraduate students.

There are two post-doctoral research stations in the school:

- Electronic Science and Technology
- Computer Science and Technology

The school offers doctoral degree programs in four primary disciplines:

- Electronic Science and Technology
- Computer Science and Technology
- Optical Engineering
- Software Engineering

There are also eight secondary disciplines under doctoral degree programs. The school's strengths include Information Science and Technology, while Optical Engineering, Circuits and Systems, and Computer Application Technology are key disciplines.

The school houses two Hebei Province Key Laboratories:

- Special Optical Fiber and Fiber Optic Sensing Lab
- Computer Virtualisation Technology and System Integration Lab

=== School of Mechanical Engineering ===
In 2023, the School of Mechanical Engineering has 5,264 students, including 2,764 undergraduates, 2,120 master's students, and 380 PhD students. Its more than 300 teachers include 87 professors (including 77 PhD supervisors) and 77 associate professors.

=== School of Materials Science and Engineering ===
In 2023, the school currently enrols 1,600 students including 820 undergraduates, 560 master students, and 220 PhD students. Since 2007, over 50% undergraduates in the school were entitled into graduate programs. The school employs 122 faculty members and staff, including 56 professors (51 PhD supervisors), 11 associate professors, and 12 senior engineers.

== International Relations ==
=== The University of Toledo ===
Qinhuangdao and Toledo established sister city ties in 1985, leading to a partnership between Yanshan University (YSU) and the University of Toledo (UToledo) since 1986. In 2008, they established the Confucius Institute at UToledo to promote Chinese culture and education. About 30,000 students took Chinese courses, with cultural activities reaching 100,000 locals. Managers from both universities participated in important events, and more than 200 people engaged in two-way exchange delegations. In 2016, YSU's School of Humanities and Law and UToledo's Law School signed a cooperation agreement. A master program and a health care training program were also established.

=== BRICS ===
Yanshan University is currently part of the BRICS Universities League.

== Notable alumni ==
- Ding Xuexiang, director of the General Office of the Chinese Communist Party, member of the 19th Party Politburo and member of the Secretariat of the Chinese Communist Party.

== Controversies ==
=== Zifeng Li's Controversial Research ===
Prof. Zifeng Li's 2021 research, titled Advancing Newtonian Physics by Upholding a Materialist Perspective on Spacetime and Energy-Matter, aimed to challenge Einstein's theory of relativity but faced skepticism due to the established verification of the theory. His work was recommended for Hebei Province Science and Technology Award despite facing several unsuccessful grant applications. Furthermore, the academic community have questioned the integrity of Prof. Li's research practices. Reportedly, Prof. Zifeng Li steadfastly rejects relativity, using his position to promote his theories in class. Allegedly, students who disagreed were unfairly graded, leading to a severe teaching incident. YSU criticized Li, imposing a 3-year undergraduate teaching suspension in 2017.

== Campus & Environment ==
The Yanshan University campus covers an area of 820 acres with a total construction area of nearly one million square meters.
