= Wu Shulian Chinese university rankings =

Rankings for Chinese universities

Wu Shulian University Ranking
- Categories: Higher education
- Frequency: Annual
- Publisher: Wu Shulian
- Founded: 1993; 32 years ago
- First issue: 1993
- Country: China
- Language: English and Chinese
- Website: wurank.net

Wu Shulian Chinese university rankings
- Simplified Chinese: 武书连大学排名
- Traditional Chinese: 武書連大學排名
Transcriptions
Standard Mandarin
- Hanyu Pinyin: Wǔshūlián dàxué páimíng

Wu Shulian is an individual who created and published by himself the rankings for universities in China. Wu Shulian's ranking has caused significant controversy due to his excessive business operations behind the rankings and for-profit indicator system design of the rankings. The publication of the rankings has been criticized by many Chinese media, including Xinhua News Agency, People's Daily, and Guangming Daily. The Ministry of Education of China strongly opposed the university rankings as it was based on the payment of "fees."

== Published ranking ==
The annual ranking has been continuously released since 1996. Top 100 universities out of 2,236 colleges and universities (general/integrated ranking) since 2002 are as below, as well as 1996 ranking.

University (membership of C9 League/Project 985)	1996	2003	2004	2005	2006	2007	2008	2009	2010	2011	2012
Zhejiang University (C9-985)	4	3	3	3	3	3	3	3	3	1	1
Peking University (C9-985)	3	2	2	2	2	2	2	2	2	2	2
Tsinghua University (C9-985)	1	1	1	1	1	1	1	1	1	3	3
Shanghai Jiao Tong University (C9-985)	21	7	7	6	4	4	4	4	4	4	4
Fudan University (C9-985)	6	4	4	4	5	6	6	6	5	5	5
Nanjing University (C9-985)	2	6	6	5	6	5	5	5	6	6	6
Wuhan University (985)	20	9	9	8	8	8	9	10	7	8	7
Sun Yat-sen University (985)	19	10	11	10	10	12	12	8	9	7	8
University of Science and Technology of China (C9-985)	10	15	15	11	13	11	7	7	13	16	17
Huazhong University of Science and Technology (985)	7	5	5	7	7	7	8	9	8	9	11
Jilin University (985)	15	8	8	9	9	9	11	11	12	12	12
Xi'an Jiaotong University (C9-985)	5	12	12	14	12	10	10	12	14	14	15
Sichuan University (985)	27	13	10	12	11	13	13	13	10	10	9
Harbin Institute of Technology (C9-985)	8	11	13	13	14	14	14	14	11	11	10
Nankai University (985)	25	19	19	18	17	17	16	15	16	15	14
Shandong University (985)	23	14	14	15	15	15	15	16	15	13	13
Beijing Normal University (985)	43	25	22	20	19	19	18	17	20	20	22
Tianjin University (985)	18	18	16	16	16	16	17	18	21	22	20
Central South University (985)	32	16	17	17	18	18	19	19	17	17	16
Southeast University (985)	9	21	20	21	22	23	20	20	18	19	19
Renmin University of China (985)	44	35	28	26	24	20	22	21	19	18	21
Beihang University (985)	14	22	23	23	23	22	23	22	25	27	27
Xiamen University (985)	42	24	25	22	21	21	21	23	26	23	23
Dalian University of Technology (985)	11	30	26	27	27	25	24	24	22	21	18
Tongji University (985)	29	23	21	24	26	24	26	25	23	25	25
South China University of Technology (985)	35	20	24	25	25	27	27	26	24	24	24
Chongqing University (985)	34	33	31	30	29	28	28	27	27	26	26
Lanzhou University (985)	33	41	42	32	33	31	30	28	29	29	29
Northwestern Polytechnical University (985)	12	26	29	28	28	26	25	29	28	28	28
East China Normal University (985)	39	36	34	33	32	30	29	30	31	33	33
Beijing Institute of Technology (985)	50	32	36	37	35	33	31	31	30	30	30
China Agricultural University (985)	13	29	30	31	30	29	32	32	33	31	31
Hunan University (985)	38	45	43	43	40	34	33	33	32	32	32
Northeastern University (985)	22	27	27	29	31	32	34	34	46	46	46
Zhengzhou University	51	44	44	44	39	36	35	35	35	34	34
Nanjing University of Aeronautics and Astronautics	17	52	47	45	44	39	36	36	36	37	36
East China University of Science and Technology	31	34	35	36	36	38	38	37	34	35	35
Soochow University	64	37	39	39	38	35	37	38	42	36	37
Nanjing Agricultural University	47	50	50	49	45	42	40	39	40	39	38
Wuhan University of Technology	63	38	38	42	42	40	39	40	39	42	42
Shanghai University	49	43	45	52	54	50	43	41	38	38	41
University of Science and Technology Beijing	26	40	40	38	43	43	42	42	50	49	51
University of Electronic Science and Technology of China (985)	37	56	56	48	49	47	48	43	37	40	39
Southwest University		93	91	79	51	51	46	45	41	43	43
Northeast Normal University	36	58	60	59	58	54	49	43	43	44	44
Xidian University	46	53	55	47	46	45	44	46	47	45	45
Northwest A&F University (985)		57	49	54	52	49	53	47	49	48	48
Jinan University	84	49	51	53	48	44	47	48	54	52	49
Nanjing University of Science and Technology	30	46	46	46	50	48	51	49	48	47	47
Huazhong Normal University	52	54	57	58	57	55	50	50	45	58	67
Weifang University		55	52	55	55	53	55	51	51	54	53
China University of Mining and Technology	24	31	33	35	41	41	45	52	53	85	87
Nanjing Normal University	70	47	48	51	53	52	52	53	64	51	54
Yangzhou University	74	51	54	57	60	57	57	54	44	41	40
Huazhong Agricultural University	69	60	58	56	56	56	62	55	61	65	58
Northwest University	95	48	53	50	47	46	54	56	62	61	63
Ocean University of China (985)	54	64	65	60	59	58	56	57	60	57	56
Hunan Normal University	62	61	61	66	65	60	61	58	59	62	68
Beijing Jiaotong University	53	66	67	73	70	62	60	59	52	55	57
South China Normal University	61	65	66	62	61	59	59	60	56	59	62
Beijing University of Chemical Technology	75	86	74	69	66	61	58	61	57	56	55
Shaanxi Normal University	80	84	83	75	71	67	63	62	66	60	60
Nanchang University	97	71	73	88	68	66	65	63	63	63	61
Shanxi University		80	72	64	64	63	64	64	69	68	70
Hohai University	85	81	70	71	69	64	66	65	67	66	64
Beijing University of Technology	81	59	64	68	74	74	67	66	65	64	65
South China Agricultural University	83	70	75	65	62	69	68	67	82	79	77
Jiangnan University		101+	101+	101+	94	85	73	68	58	53	52
Donghua University		75	86	84	77	82	75	69	55	50	50
Nanjing University of Technology		72	63	67	75	70	70	70	77	80	78
Fuzhou University		69	77	83	79	72	72	71	83	77	74
China University of Geosciences (Wuhan)		42	37	41	34	65	69	72	72	72	73
Yanshan University		91	79	81	82	75	74	73	73	73	75
Henan University	59	97	101+	93	87	83	77	74	71	67	66
Zhejiang University of Technology		100	92	91	91	88	80	75	74	70	71
Harbin Engineering University	90	96	89	78	78	79	71	76	81	75	69
Hebei University		82	81	86	81	77	76	77	80	78	80
Jiangsu University		73	71	77	83	81	79	78	75	74	72
Shandong Agricultural University	23	87	80	76	76	73	81	79	93	101+	101+
Hefei University of Technology	68	79	85	87	86	87	78	80	68	71	76
Xiangtan University	98	89	93	89	90	89	85	81	78	83	82
Capital University of Medical Sciences		63	59	61	63	68	82	82	70	69	59
China University of Petroleum (Qingdao, Shandong Province)	48	39	41	40	37	37	41	83	85	84	89
Yunnan University		67	69	72	72	78	83	84	79	76	79
Zhongnan University of Economics and Law		74	62	74	80	76	86	85	86	90	88
China Medical University		62	68	63	67	71	87	86	101+	101+	101+
Southern Medical University		101+	101+	101+	101+	80	88	87	98	101+	101+
China University of Geosciences (Beijing)		42	37	41	34	91	89	88	89	88	93
North China Electric Power University		101+	95	101+	100	94	92	89	76	81	84
Shanghai University of Finance and Economics		85	76	85	84	90	90	90	88	82	83
Beijing University of Posts and Telecommunications	89	94	100	92	85	86	84	91	87	87	81
China Pharmaceutical University		101+	101+	101+	96	101+	97	92	90	94	85
Shandong Normal University	65	99	97	94	97	95	91	93	95	101+	101+
Heilongjiang University		101+	101+	101+	101+	101+	96	94	94	92	91
Capital Normal University		101+	101+	101+	101+	101+	101+	95	92	93	95
Shanghai Normal University		98	96	97	101+	101+	98	96	95	95	96
Anhui University		95	98	98	101+	101+	99	97	101+	101+	100
Fujian Normal University	77	92	101+	101+	101+	101+	100	98	101+	101+	101+
Taiyuan University of Technology	79	88	84	80	89	99	101+	99	101+	101+	101+
Kunming University of Science and Technology		83	90	90	95	93	93	100	101+	101+	101+

Notes:

- The rank once tried category ranking in 1998. To list top 5, comprehensive universities ranking: 1. Nanjing University, 2. Peking University, 3. Fudan University, 4. Shandong University, 5. Jilin University, and technological universities ranking: 1. Tsinghua University, 2. Zhejiang University, 3. Southeast University, 4. Huazhong University of Science and Technology, 5. Xi'an Jiaotong University. However, many schools developed to be comprehensive universities soon later, including through mergers.
- Since about the year 2000 there were peaks of mergers of universities for several years, and one of the reasons for them is to become comprehensive universities.
- China University of Petroleum has two branches: One in Beijing and the other one in Qingdao, Shandong Province. The Qingdao branch is ranked among Top 100 (no. 83).
- China University of Geosciences also has two branches: One in Beijing and the other one in Wuhan, Hubei Province. Both branches are ranked among Top 100 (Wuhan no. 72 and Beijing no. 88).

== Controversies ==
In 2009, the leader of this university ranking program, Mr. Wu Shulian, was reported to have been involved in a fee-for-ranking scandal, involving universities being able to pay money to the ranking program in order to boost their rankings. Consequently, the creditability of his ranking came under criticism. The Ministry of Education of the People's Republic of China strongly opposes all university rankings, especially those based on payment of “fees”, a ministry spokeswoman Xu Mei said.

A study by an anonymous group from the Chinese University of Science and Technology showed that California Institute of Technology would fail to rank on the Chinese university rankings if calculated by Wu Shulian's ranking standard, which was considered ridiculous due to that university's international reputation as a leading research institution. This widespread controversy has greatly affected the credit of this ranking program and has frequently been reported on by the media. Wu Shuliang officially responded with paper in Higher Education Development and Evaluation addressing several mistakes made by the study, including failure to correctly use the ranking method, failure to show the calculation process, meaning that the calculations cannot be repeated, inappropriately publishing classified data from the Ministry of Education of the People's Republic of China, inappropriate use of unavailable/non-equivalent indices/scores for California Institute of Technology constituting 78.79% of total indices/scores. Wu Shuliang's paper shows California Institute of Technology clearly ranks much higher than any of Chinese Universities using his published method with proper treatment.

== See also ==
- Rankings of universities in China
- University rankings in China
- List of universities in China
- Chinese university ranking (Netbig)
- Chinese university ranking of billionaire alumni
- Project 211
- Project 985
- 863 Program
- College and university rankings
- Academic Ranking of World Universities, by Shanghai Jiao Tong University’s Institute of Higher Education.
- THES - QS World University Rankings, by Times Higher Education (THE) and Quacquarelli Symonds.
