= East China University of Science and Technology =

Public university in Shanghai, China

Coordinates: 31°08′35″N 121°25′30″E

- 华东理工大学
- Other name: Huali (华理)
- Former name: East China Institute of Chemical Technology (1952-1993)
- Motto: 勤奋求实，励志明德
- Motto in English: Diligence, Factuality, Aspiration and Virtue
- Type: Public
- Established: 1952; 74 years ago
- President: Qu Jingping (曲景平)
- Faculty: 3,052
- Students: c. 25,000
- Undergraduates: 15,667
- Postgraduates: 8,235
- Doctoral students: 1,524
- Other students: 1,358 foreign students
- Location: Xuhui, Shanghai, China
- Colors: Blue and white
- Website: ecust.edu.cn
- (Statistical data as of May 2017)

East China University of Science and Technology
- Simplified Chinese: 华东理工大学
- Traditional Chinese: 華東理工大學
Transcriptions
Standard Mandarin
- Hanyu Pinyin: Huádōng Lǐgōng Dàxué

The East China University of Science and Technology (ECUST; Chinese: 华东理工大学; pinyin: Huádōng Lǐgōng Dàxué) is a public university located in Shanghai, China. It is affiliated with the Ministry of Education. The university is part of Project 211 and the Double First-Class Construction.

Established in 1952 as East China Institute of Chemical Technology, it has evolved from an institution with a strong focus on chemical engineering into a university that covers a wide range of academic disciplines.

== History ==
It was founded in 1952 with chemistry faculty inherited from Jiaotong University, Aurora University, Utopia University, Soochow University, and Jiangnan University.

== Xuhui Campus ==
The main campus is located on Meilong Road in Xuhui District, in the southwest of downtown Shanghai and 17 kilometers from Hongqiao Airport, with an area of approximately 415,000 m^{2} and 21 dorms capable of accommodating 15,000 students. Most of the departments are easily reached from the Front Gate, behind which Pandeng Road directly leads to the Main Building. Out of the built-up space, classrooms take up 56,000 m^{2} and laboratories 118,000 m^{2}. The campus houses the administrative offices of the university, Master's as well as PhD students, international exchange and language students, and is home to most of the research facilities.

The Middle School Affiliated To ECUST (华东理工大学附属中学), was established in 1992 and is located in the south of Xuhui District, not far from the main campus. It is attended by 1,200 middle and high school students.

== Academics ==
=== General ===
It has a strong tradition of working with industries. The university is now developing into a multi-disciplinary higher educational institution with a balanced curriculum of science, engineering, economics, management, law, humanities and arts spread across 15 academic schools. It is one of Double First Class University Plan, former Project 211 and 985 experiment universities.

The university offers 13 first level and 81 second level doctoral programs, 25 first level and 147 second level master programs and 65 undergraduate programs. The total number of full-time students has reached around 24,140, including 15,460 undergraduates, 7,110 postgraduates studying for master's degrees and 1,570 Ph.D. candidates.

Since 2007 the university has operated an exchange programme with the Technical University of Applied Sciences Lübeck in Germany. ECUST also operates a joint programme with L'École Nationale Supérieure de Chimie in Rennes and a joint business school with Lucian Blaga University of Sibiu in Romania.

University rankings
BCUR National	Domestic	44
Wu Shulian National	Domestic	54
QS National	General	=41
THE National	General	38–51
QS Asia (Asia version)	General	215
THE Asia (Asia version)	General	=121
ARWU World	Research	301–400
QS World	General	=673
THE World	General	601–800
USNWR World	General	=643

=== Disciplines ===
Seven majors are distinguished as national key disciplines, those include:

- Chemical Engineering
- Chemical Technology
- Biochemical Engineering
- Applied Chemistry
- Industrial Catalysis
- Chemical Process Equipment
- Control Theory and Control Engineering
- Material Science

Essential Science Indicators (ESI) Subject Ranking

ECUST has six disciplines, including chemistry, materials science, engineering, biochemistry and biology, agricultural science, and pharmacology and toxicology ranked among the global top 1% by the Essential Science Indicators (ESI) subject ranking, and specifically, its chemistry program is ranked among the global top 1‰. According to 2016 Nature Index data, ECUST is the world's top 34th academic institution in chemistry (based on weighted fractional count from January to December 2016).

=== Schools ===
The university departments are organized in 15 academic schools.

=== International Cooperation ===
Long-term academic relationships have been established with more than 60 universities, enterprises, and research institutes all over the world. The following degrees are offered jointly with partner universities:

- MBA Program with the University of Canberra, Australia
- International Business Program with Wollongong University, Australia
- Chemical Engineering and Technology Program with Fachhochschule Lübeck, Germany
- Project Management Program with the University of Management and Technology, United States

== Library and University Press ==
Library

The Library of East China University of Science and Technology (ECUST) was established in 1952 and is placed under direct auspice of the Ministry of Education of People's Republic of China. Starting with the collections of the different departments that initially made up the foundation of the college, it has developed into a research library for multiple disciplines ranging from chemistry and chemical engineering to natural sciences, engineering, management and liberal arts.

The library system of ECUST encompasses three branches among the major campuses. The library in Xuhui, built in 1987, houses most of the book collections, while the new nine-story library in Fengxian marks the center of the new campus and is geared towards undergraduate students. Together, they cover a floor space of almost 46,000 m^{2} and offer 3,500 seats in the reading rooms. Electronic resources are abundant, with databases shared among several university library systems and access to academic journals. In total, more than 2,600,000 books and publications are available. The university maintains subscriptions for over 2,000 foreign journals in print and over 30,000 in digital form. There is also a library in its Jinshan Campus, storing many books with a low usage.

The library is a member of the Shanghai Library system and one of its main nodes where inter-library loan is possible. It plays an active part in the theory and practice of teaching literature search that have been set up at ECUST. In 2004, with the introduction of a master's degree in Information science, this role was further strengthened. Also on offer are services to students and the wider public, including, but not limited to, a language training center and the provision of teaching material in foreign languages, a center for the distribution of cultural resources and book consulting services both in-person and online.

University Press

The East China University of Technology University Press, founded in 1986, focuses on publications in the technical and social sciences as well as foreign languages and elementary education.

== Campus scenery ==
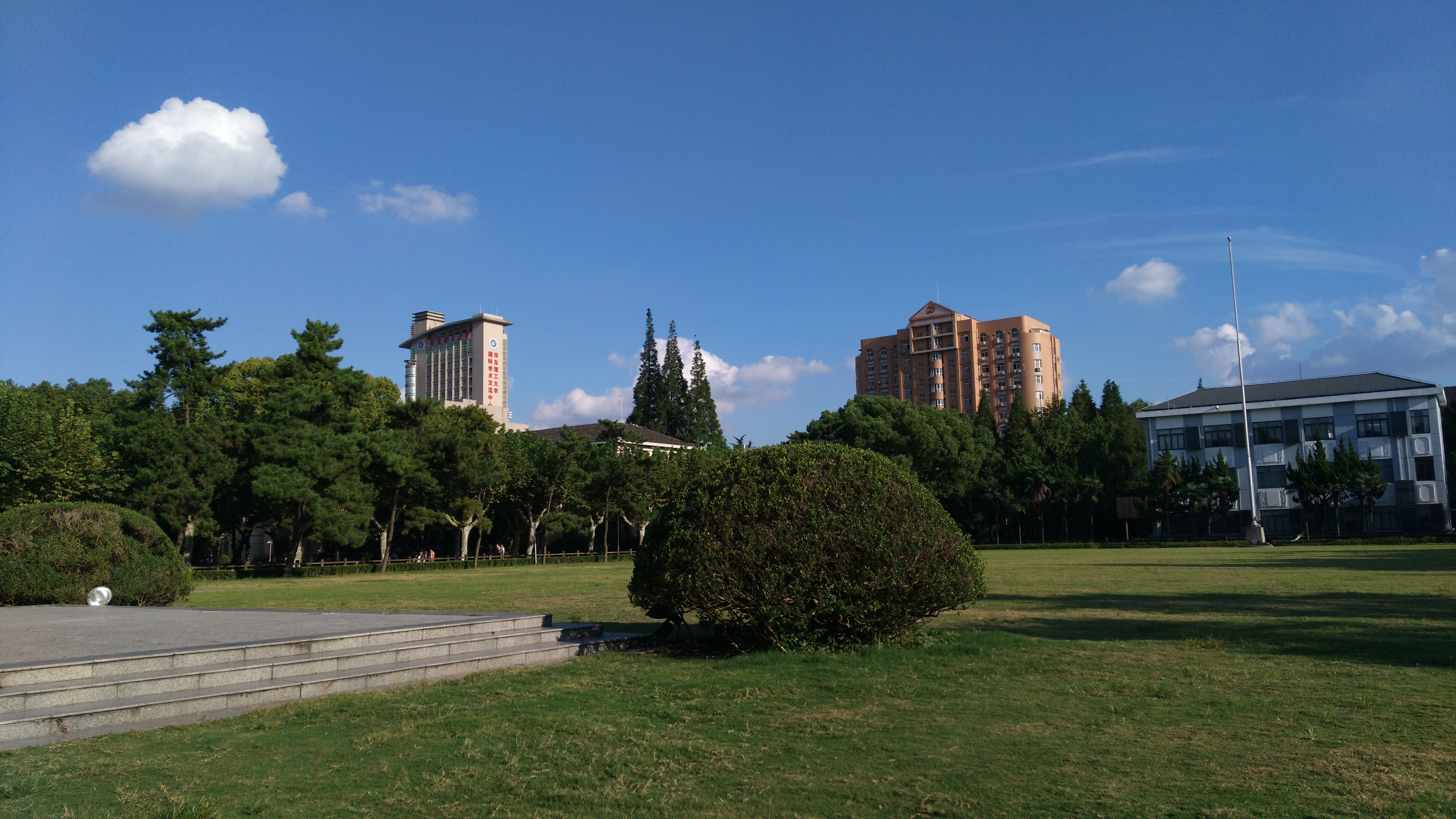
Greensward, Xuhui Campus

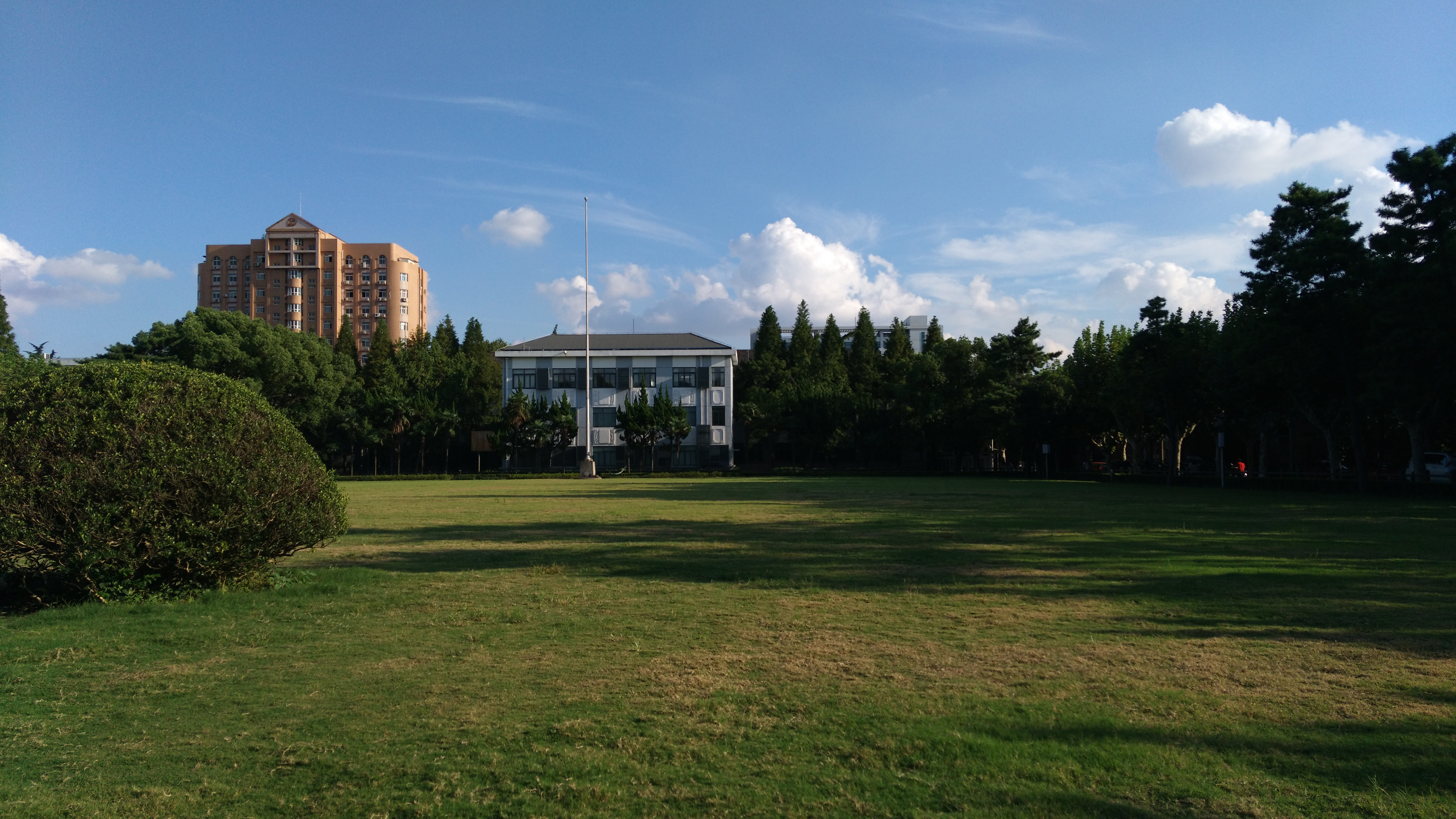
Greensward, Xuhui Campus

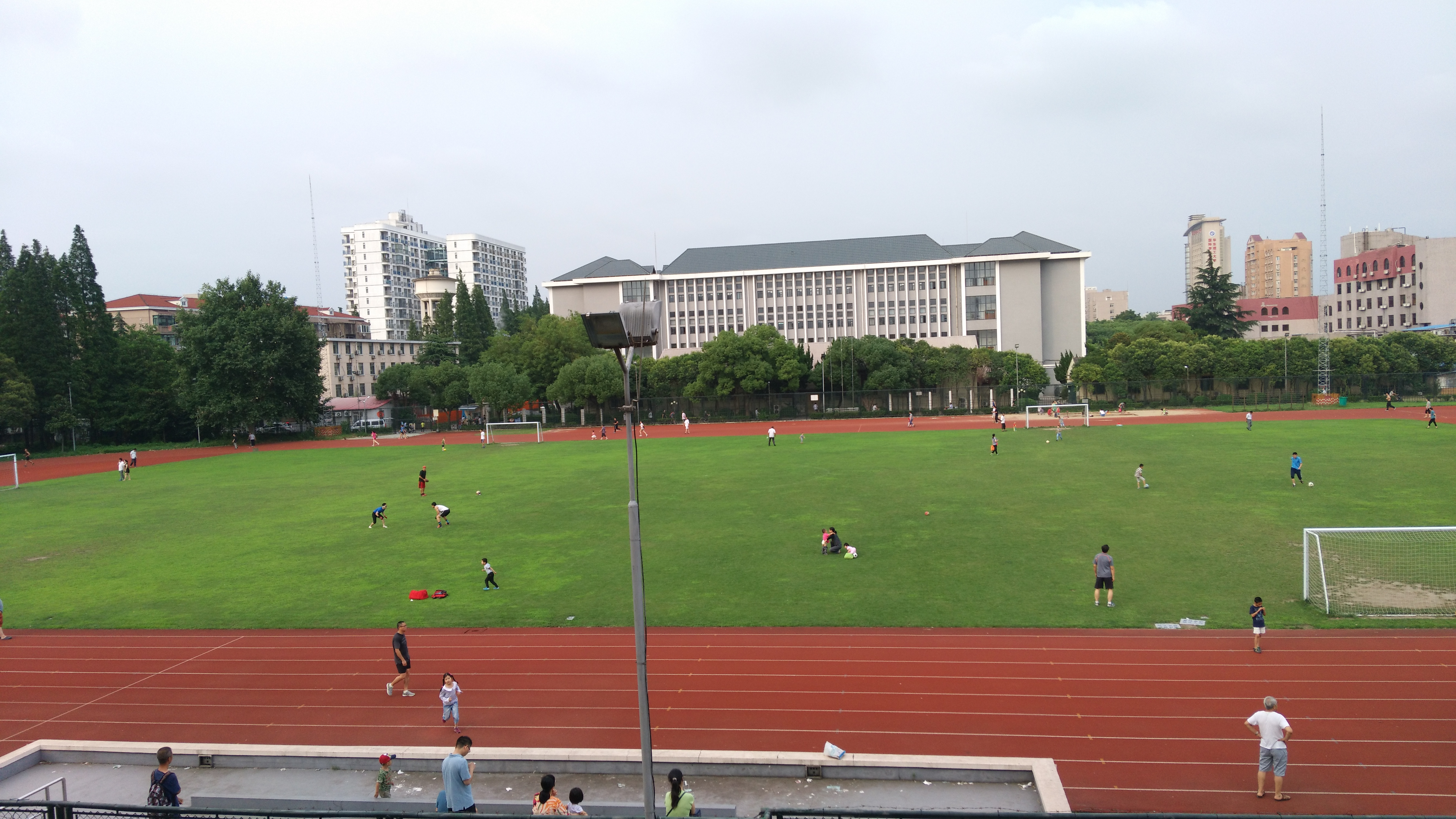
Outdoor stadium, Xuhui campus

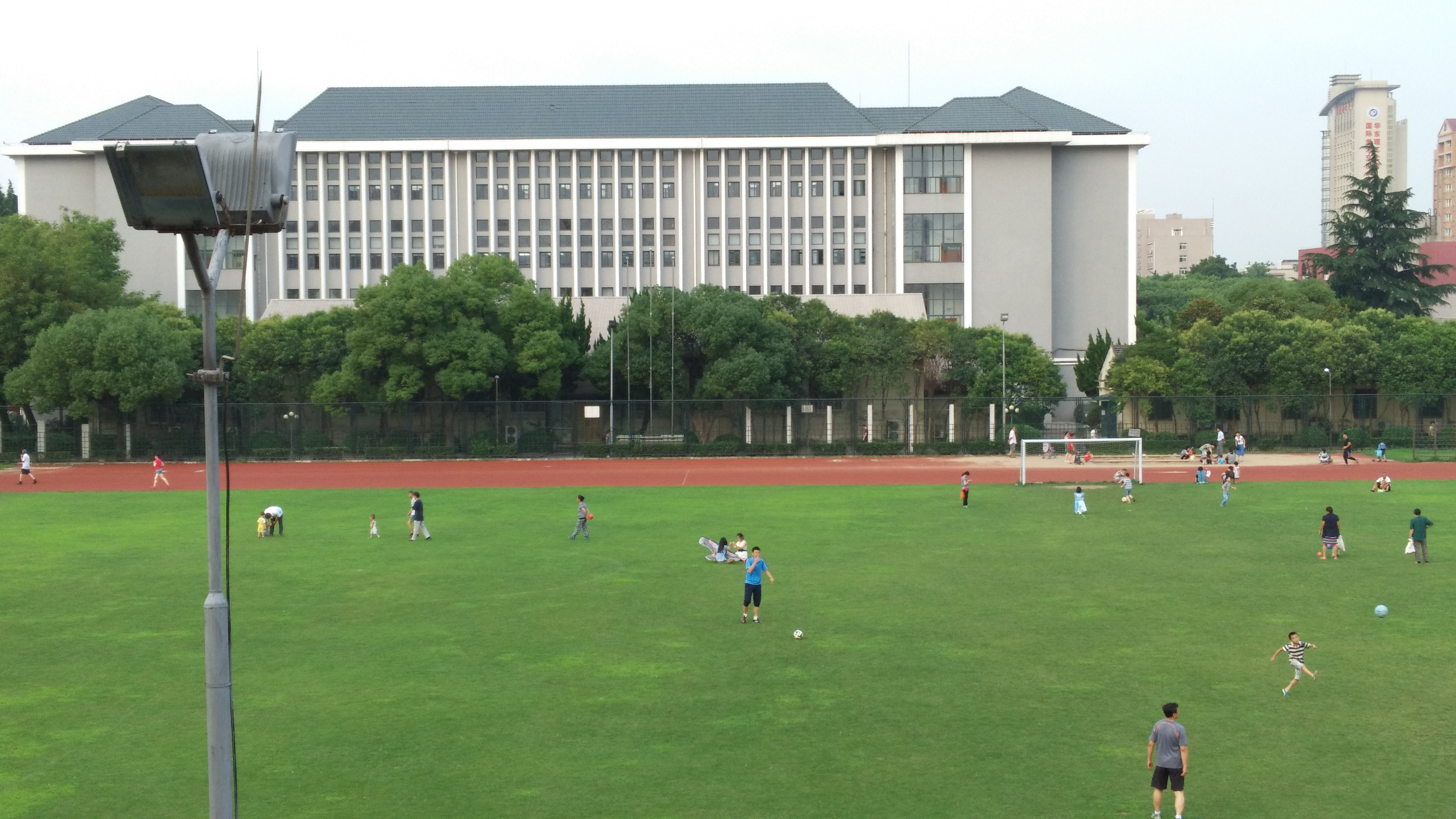
Outdoor stadium, Xuhui campus

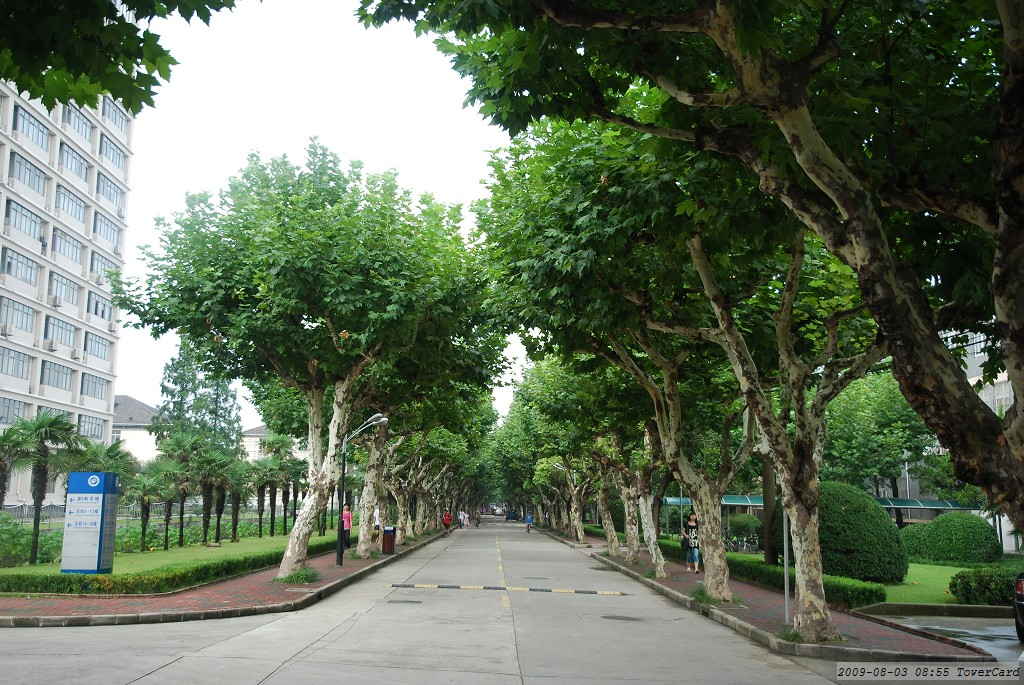
Xingzhi Road, Xuhui Campus

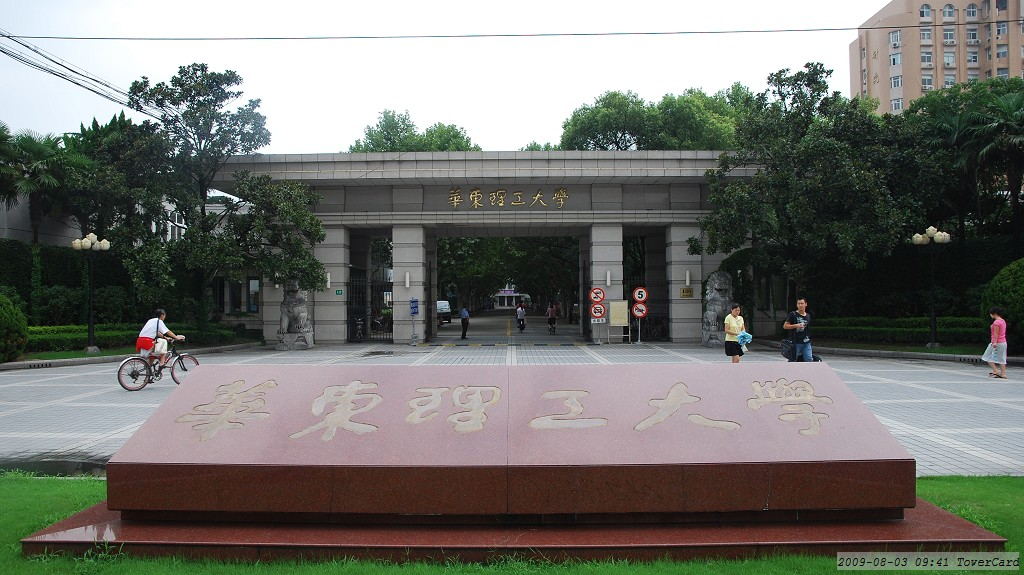
South Gate, Xuhui Campus

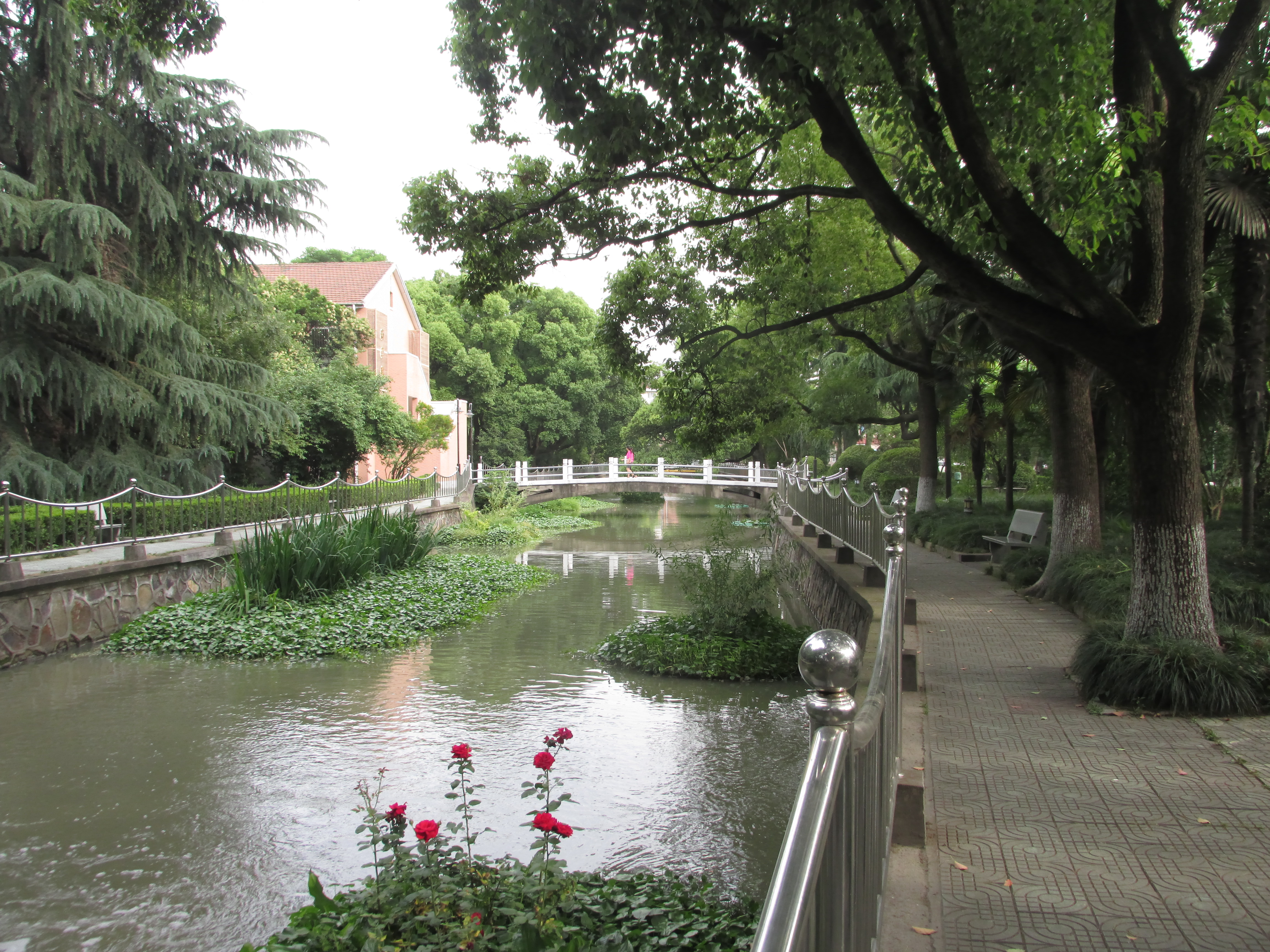
River scenery on Xuhui Campus

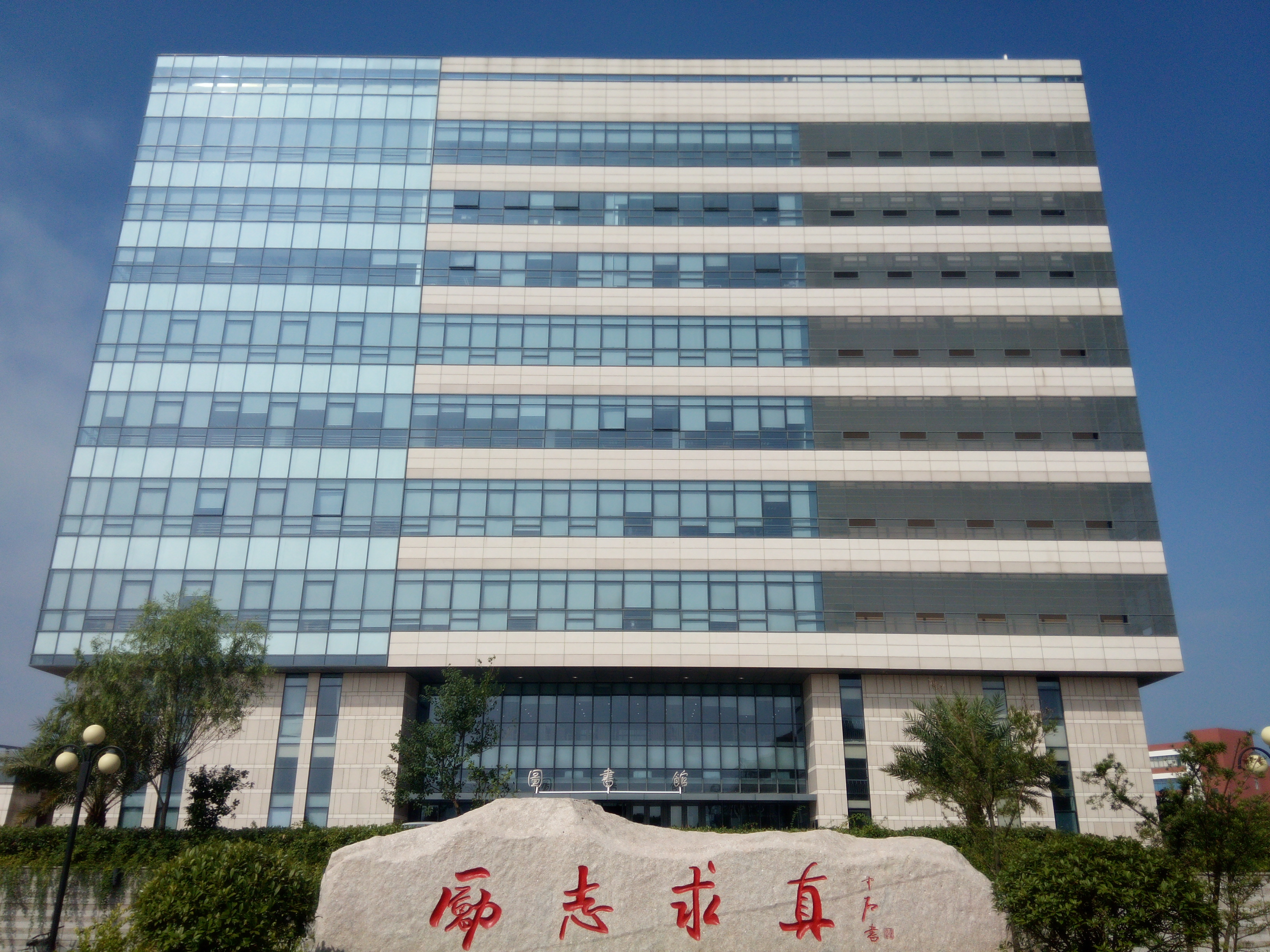
University Library on Fengxian Campus

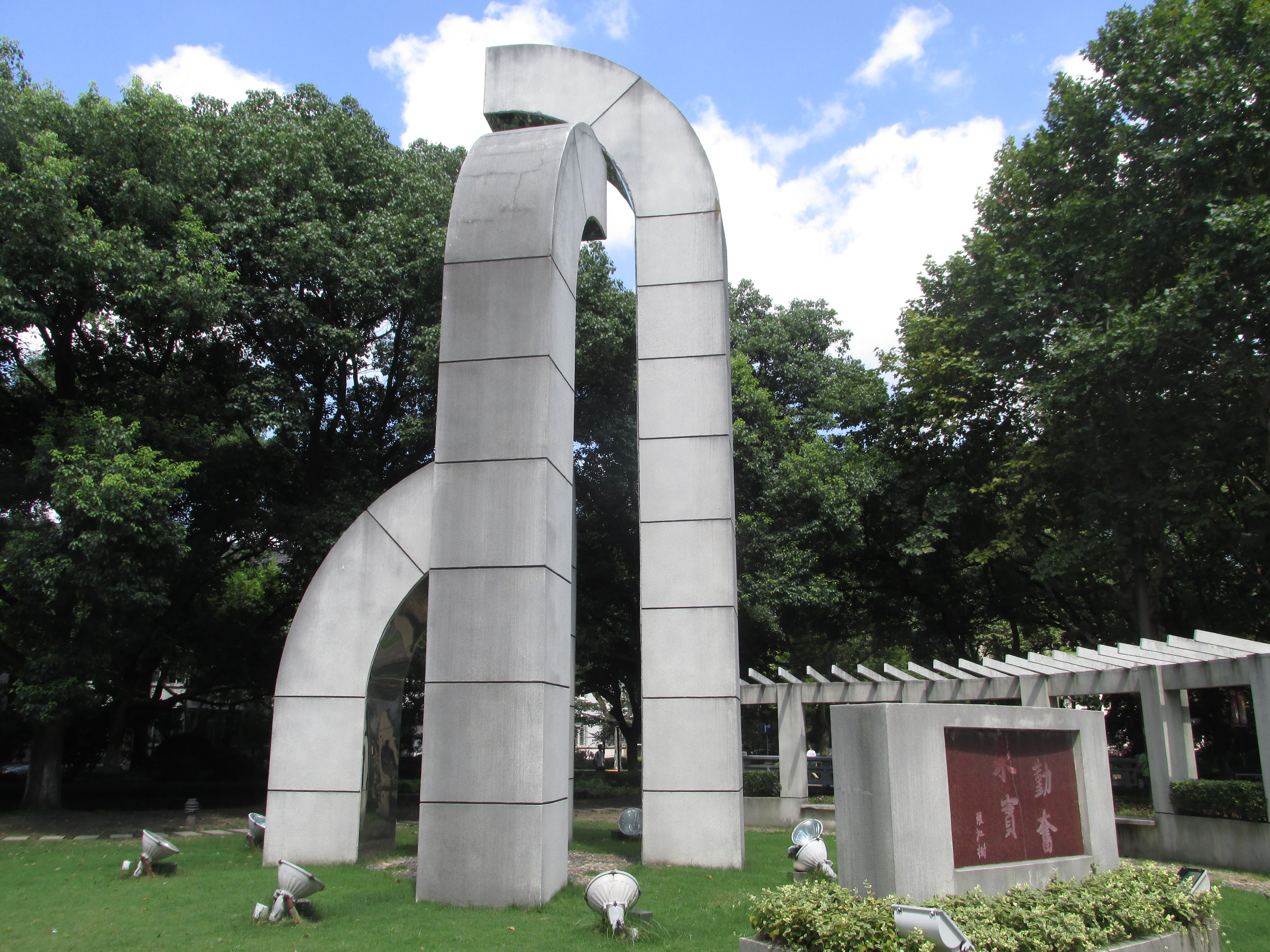
Endeavour Wall on Xuhui Campus

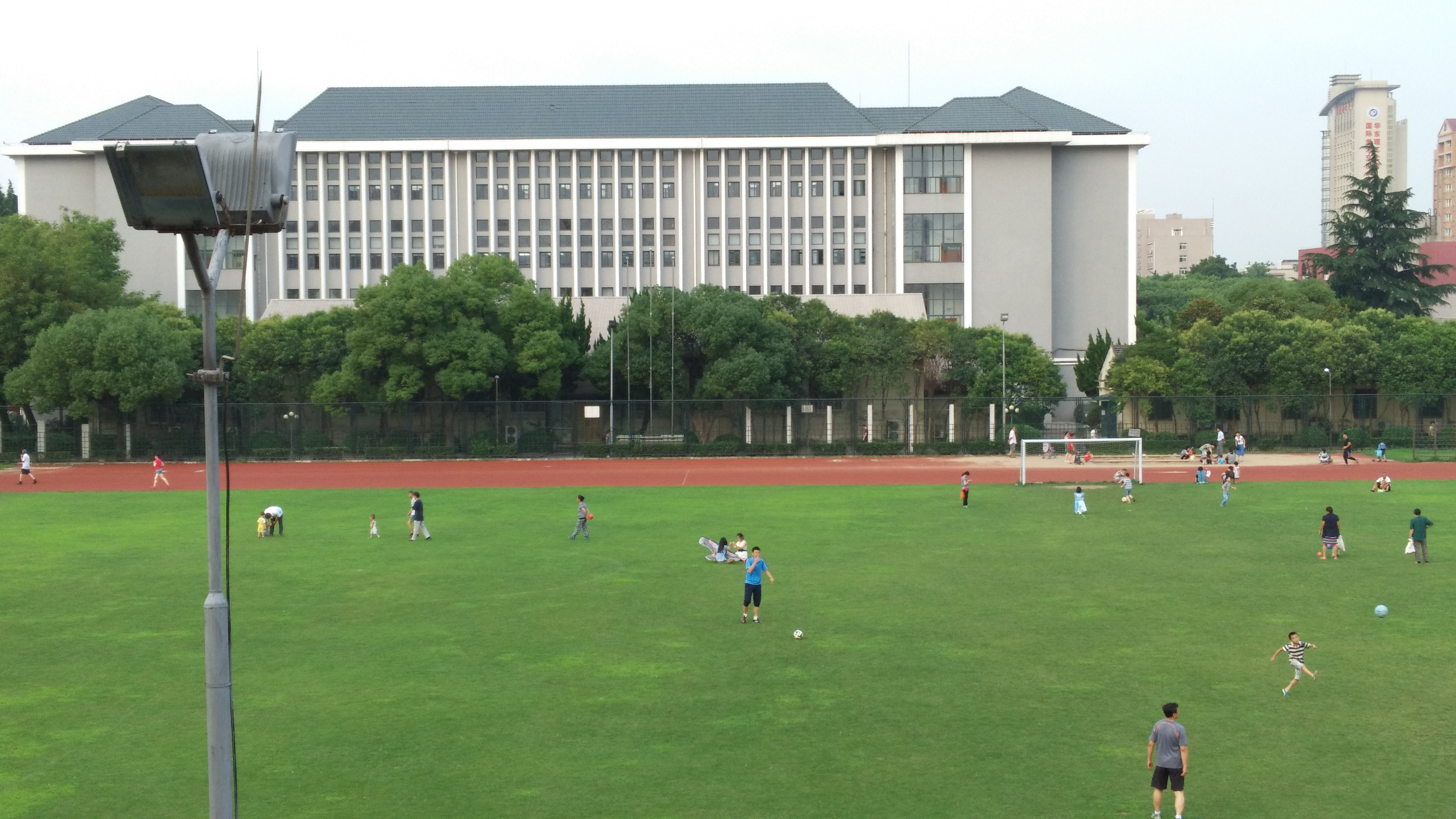
Stadium of Xuhui Campus

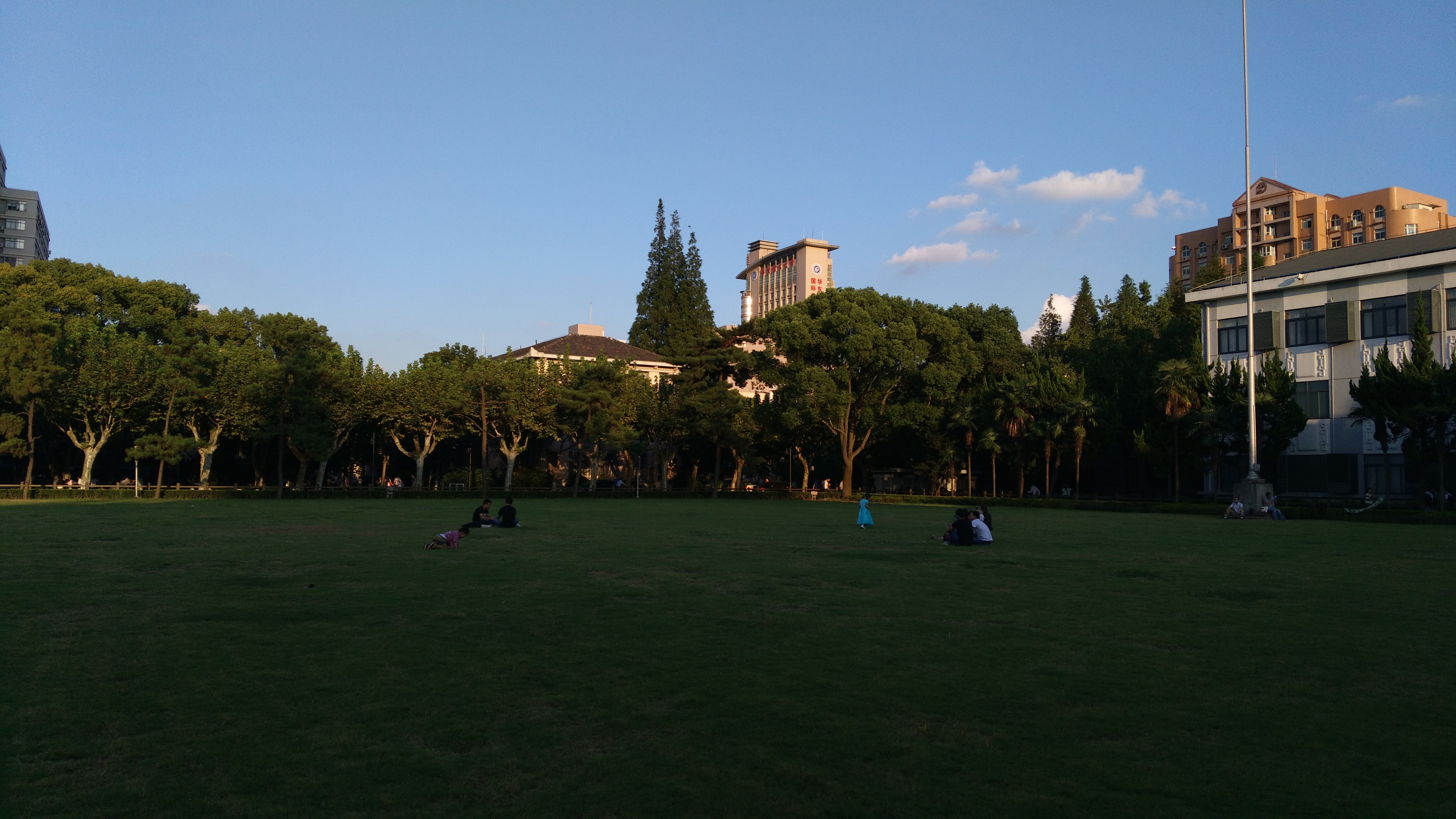
Greensward of Xuhui Campus

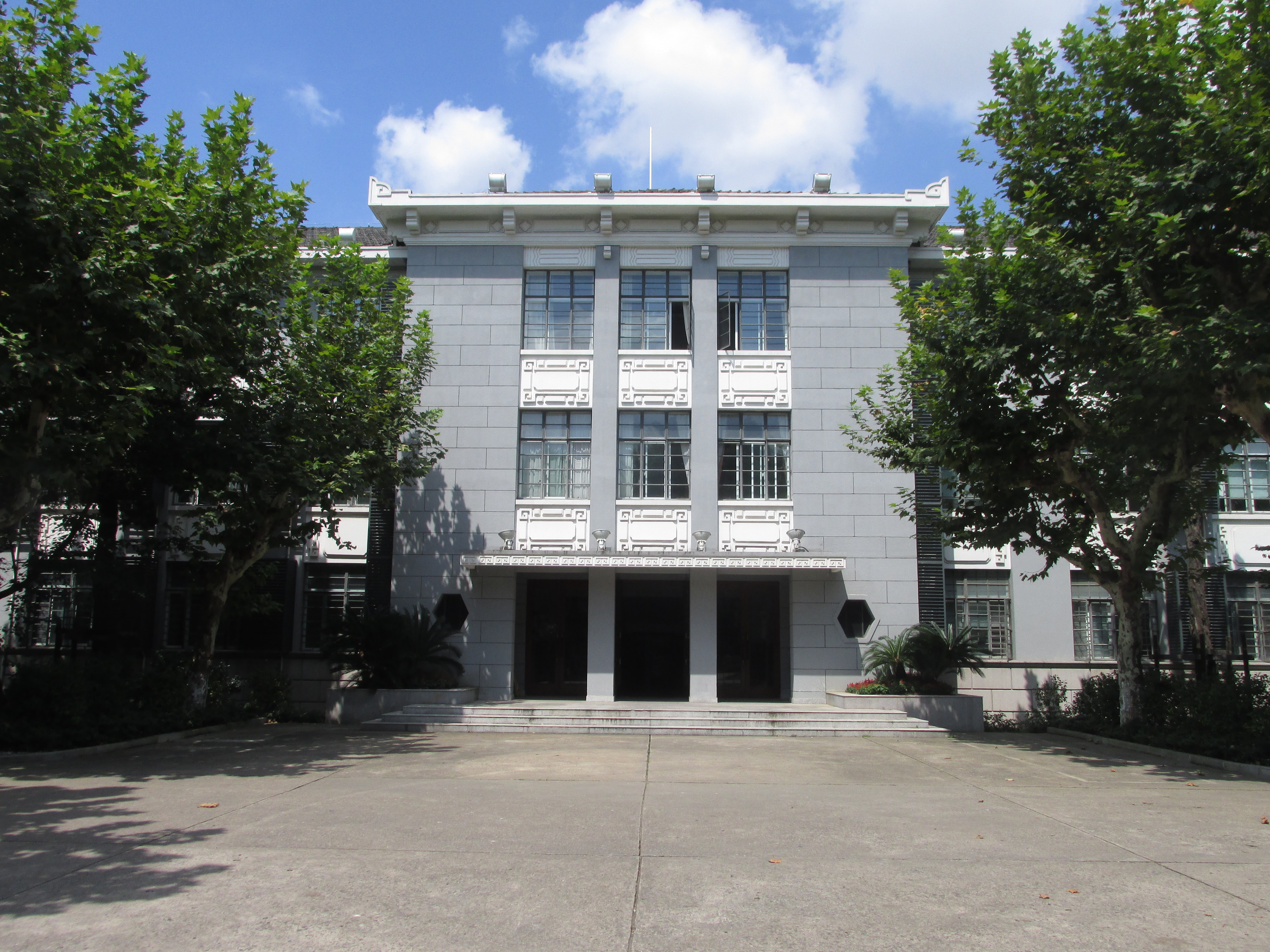
Main Building on Xuhui Campus
