= China Agricultural University =

Public university in Beijing, China

- 中国农业大学
- Motto: 解民生之多艰，育天下之英才
- Motto in English: Solve the difficulties of people's livelihood; Educate talents under the sky
- Type: Public
- Established: 1905; 121 years ago
- President: Sun Qixin
- Academic staff: 1,860
- Undergraduates: 12,000
- Postgraduates: 8,900
- Location: 17 Qinghua East Rd, Haidian, Beijing, 100083, China; 40.001957°N 116.35482°E
- Campus: Urban
- Website: www.cau.edu.cn

Chinese name
- Simplified Chinese: 中国农业大学
- Traditional Chinese: 中國農業大學
Transcriptions
Standard Mandarin
- Hanyu Pinyin: Zhōngguó Nóngyè Dàxué

China Agricultural University (CAU) is a public university in Haidian, Beijing, China. The university is affiliated with the Ministry of Education of China. It is part of Project 211, Project 985, and the Double First-Class Construction.

The university was formed in 1995 through the merger of the Beijing Agricultural University and the Beijing Agricultural Engineering University, which evolved from one of the earliest agriculture institutions in China founded in 1905.

As of December 2019, CAU offers 66 undergraduate majors and over 32 masters and 21 doctoral programs. There are around 12,000 undergraduate and 8,900 graduate students. Among them, 508 students are international. Its gymnasium hosted the wrestling events during the 2008 Summer Olympics.

== History ==
The history of China Agricultural University can be traced back to 1905 when the College of Agriculture was founded in the former Imperial University of Peking. Beijing Agricultural University (BAU) was established in September 1949 through the merging of Peking University's College of Agriculture, Tsinghua University's College of Agriculture and North China University's College of Agriculture.

In 1954, BAU was listed by the State Council as one of the Top-Six National Key Universities as well as one of the Top-Ten Key Universities for further construction and improvement.

In October 1952, BAU's Department of Agricultural Machinery, North China College of Agricultural Machinery and Ministry of Agriculture's Central Agricultural Mechanization School merged to form the Beijing Mechanized Agricultural College, which was renamed Beijing Agricultural Mechanization Institute (BAMI) in July 1953. The BAMI was listed by the State Council in October 1960 as one of the 64 National Key Universities and then renamed again as Beijing Agricultural Engineering University (BAEU) in 1985.

In 1995, Beijing Agricultural University and Beijing Agricultural Engineering University merged as China Agricultural University (CAU). Since then, the university has become the top academic institution in China in terms of agricultural studies.

Rugby re-emerged in the PRC in 1990, with a club formed at Beijing Agricultural University. A professor there, Chao Xihuang, was introduced to the sport by a Japanese businessman, and set up a couple of sides.

Some of the earliest China-Israel bilateral cooperation occurred at CAU, in the form of the Sino-Israeli Agricultural Training Center.

== Rankings and reputation ==
University rankings
BCUR National	Domestic	25
Wu Shulian National	Domestic	37
CUAA National	Alumni	29
QS National	General	=33
QS Asia (Asia version)	General	=190
ARWU World	Research	151–200
QS World	General	=504
USNWR World	General	192

=== General Rankings ===
The China Agricultural University first appeared in the world's top 500 universities in the global university ranking in 2007.

As of 2026, the university was listed as one of the top 200 global universities in the World University Rankings.

=== Subject Rankings ===
==== Agricultural Science ====
The China Agricultural University is regarded as one of the world's top agricultural research institutions. CAU has been ranked in the top 5 Best Global Universities for "Agricultural Science" by the U.S. News & World Report Best Global Universities Ranking since the ranking's inception in 2014.

As of 2025, China Agricultural University was ranked the best university in the world in "Agricultural Sciences" by the Performance Ranking of Scientific Papers for World Universities, the Academic Ranking of World Universities (ARWU), and the U.S. News & World Report Best Global University Ranking. The 2025 CWTS Leiden Ranking ranked CAU #1 in the world based on the number of their scientific publications belonging to the top 1%, top 5%, and top 10% in "life and earth science."

The QS World University Rankings listed CAU the first in Asia and Oceania region and 4th in the world in "Agriculture & Forestry".

==== Plant and Animal Science/ Veterinary Science ====
As of 2025, CAU ranked #1 in the world in "Plant and Animal Science" by the Performance Ranking of Scientific Papers for World Universities and the U.S. News & World Report Best Global University Ranking. It also ranked 2nd in "Veterinary Science" globally by the Academic Ranking of World Universities.

==== Food Science and Technology ====
As of 2025, CAU ranked #2 globally in "Food Science and Technology" by the U.S. News & World Report Best Global University Ranking and the Academic Ranking of World Universities, respectively.
