= CUAA =

CUAA may refer to:

- Concordia University Ann Arbor, a satellite campus of the private Lutheran university Concordia University Wisconsin in the United States
- CUAA Chinese university ranking, a university ranking published by a website called Chinese Universities Alumni Association (CUAA.net)
