= Dongda =

Dongda (东大; lit. 'Eastern university') may refer to:

- Northeastern University (东北大学), a public university in Shenyang, Liaoning, China
- Southeast University (东南大学), a public university based in Nanjing, Jiangsu, China
- University of Tokyo (東京大学; also as Todai), a public university in Tokyo, Japan
