= Shanghai University of Finance and Economics =

Public university in Shanghai, China

- 上海财经大学
- Motto: 厚德博学，经济匡时
- Motto in English: Strive for Virtue and Knowledge, Assist in Economy and Governance
- Type: Public university
- Established: 1917; 109 years ago
- President: Jiang Chuanhai
- Faculty: 1,575
- Undergraduates: 12,666
- Postgraduates: 5,914
- Location: Shanghai, China
- Campus: Urban
- Nickname: 上财 (Shàng Cái) or 财大 (Cái Dà)
- Website: sufe.edu.cn

Chinese name
- Simplified Chinese: 上海财经大学
- Traditional Chinese: 上海財經大學
Transcriptions
Standard Mandarin
- Hanyu Pinyin: Shànghǎi Cáijīng Dàxué

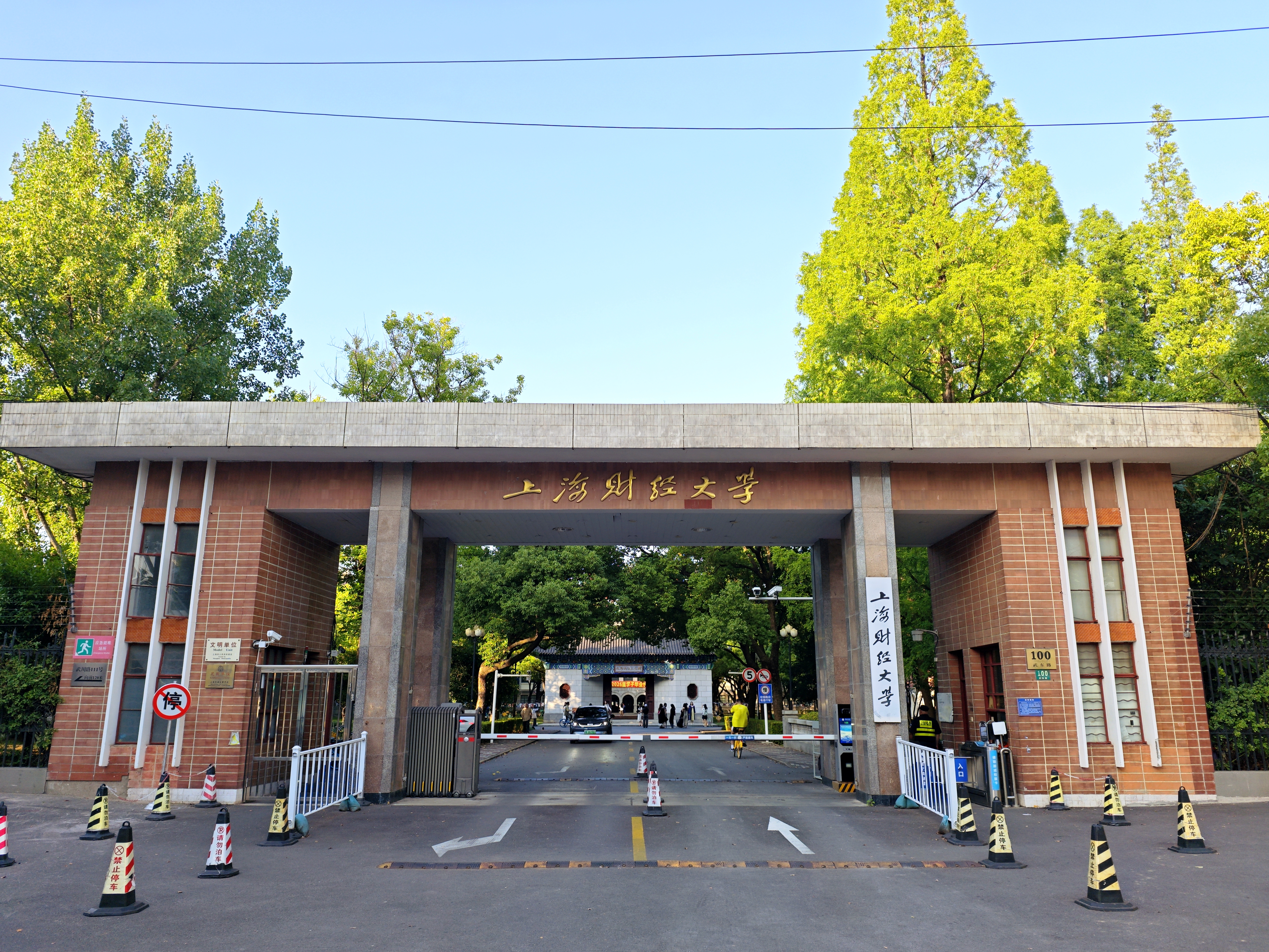
Gate of Wudong Road Campus

The Shanghai University of Finance and Economics (SUFE) is a public finance and economics university located in Shanghai, China. The university is affiliated with the Ministry of Education. It is part of the Double First-Class Construction and Project 211.

== History ==
The university began as a business program at the Nanjing Advanced Normal School in 1917. The program was relocated to Shanghai and became the Shanghai University of Commerce in 1921.

Over the years the university had evolved. By 1928, It was renamed as the School of Commerce of the Central University. In 1932, it was split from the Central University and became the National Shanghai College of Commerce. In 1950, the institution became the Shanghai College of Finance and Economics. The institution adopted its present name the Shanghai University of Finance and Economics in 1985.

== Rankings ==
The university had been consistently ranked No. 1 in the "finance and economics" category in 2003, 2004, 2005, 2007 and 2008 by the Chinese university ranking (Netbig). According to Tilburg University's Economics Schools Research Ranking between 2016 and 2020, SUFE ranked 41st in the world, 3rd in Asia and 2nd in mainland China, only after Peking University. As of 2021, it ranked the best in China among universities specialized on finance, business, and economics in the recent edition of the recognized Best Chinese Universities Ranking.

According to Quacquarelli Symonds, SUFE ranks 144th amongst BRICS universities, the top 350 universities in Asia. It also ranked in the top 64 for "Economics & Econometrics" in the world and the top 101 for "Accounting & Finance" in the world.

As of 2022, SUFE is ranked between the top 701-800 among world universities according to the Academic Ranking of World Universities. As of 2023, according to the Academic Ranking of World Universities, SUFE ranked amongst the top 43 universities in the world for "finance", the top # 76 universities in the world for "economics", the top # 101 universities in "Management", "Public Administration" and "Statistics", the top # 201 universities in the world for "Business Administration" and "Hospitality & Tourism Management" and top # 401 universities globally for "Political Sciences".

The U.S. News & World Report ranks SUFE at #34 globally, #10 in Asia and 7th in China in Business and Economics.
