= Netbig Chinese university ranking =

Ranking of universities in China

The Chinese university ranking is a ranking of universities in mainland China by Netbig, an internet company focused on higher education, founded by Jiang Jining, who graduated from University of Science and Technology of China. The ranking is conducted annually since 1999, and is generally released in July, around the time of college entrance examination. This ranking, however, has ceased to publish newer versions since 2013.

== Ranking methods ==
There are seven different ranking systems in Chinese university ranking (Netbig).

The first ranking system is "comprehensive (overall) ranking", which is based on 2~7th ranking system.

The second ranking system is based on "reputation".

The third ranking system is based on "academic resources".

The fourth ranking system is based on "academic achievement".

The fifth ranking system is based on "student ability".

The sixth ranking system is based on "professor honor".

The seventh ranking system is based on "reserve fund".

== Criticism ==
After its first release Netbig was sued by a Renmin University of China alumnus for committing libel to his Alma mater, by ranking the school 25th when it has the best law school in China. An official from the Chinese Ministry of Education commented on the ranking as being "baseless" and "completely without scientific studies." Some also argued that Netbig did not but should have considered employment data in ranking the universities.

== Top 10 Universities ==
The rank started in 1999 and ceased in 2013.

=== 1999 ===
1. Tsinghua University
2. Peking University
3. Nanjing University
4. Zhejiang University
5. University of Science and Technology of China
6. Fudan University
7. Shanghai Jiaotong University
8. Tianjin University
9. Xi'an Jiaotong University
10. Beijing University of Aeronautics and Astronautics

=== 2010 ===
Ranking:

1. Tsinghua University
2. Peking University
3. Zhejiang University
4. Shanghai Jiao Tong University
5. Fudan University
6. Nanjing University
7. University of Science and Technology of China
8. Harbin Institute of Technology
9. Renmin University of China
10. Beijing Normal University
Huazhong University of Science and Technology

=== 2011 ===
Ranking:

1. Tsinghua University
2. Peking University
3. Zhejiang University
4. University of Science and Technology of China
5. Nanjing University
6. Shanghai Jiao Tong University
7. Fudan University
8. Renmin University of China
9. Harbin Institute of Technology
10. Beijing University of Aeronautics and Astronautics

=== 2013 ===
Ranking:

1. Tsinghua University
2. Peking University
3. Zhejiang University
4. University of Science and Technology of China
5. Nanjing University
6. Fudan University
7. Shanghai Jiao Tong University
8. Harbin Institute of Technology
9. Renmin University of China
10. Beijing University of Aeronautics and Astronautics

== See also ==
- Rankings of universities in China
- University rankings in China
- List of universities in China
- Chinese university ranking (Chinese Academy of Management Science)
- Chinese university ranking of billionaire alumni
- Project 211
- Project 985
- 863 Program
- College and university rankings
- Academic Ranking of World Universities, by Shanghai Jiao Tong University's Institute of Higher Education.
- THES - QS World University Rankings, by Times Higher Education (THE) and Quacquarelli Symonds.
