= Northeastern University (China) =

Public university in Shenyang, Liaoning, China

Coordinates: 41°45′55″N 123°25′06″E

- 东北大学
- Motto: 自强不息，知行合一
- Motto in English: Striving endlessly for improvement, combining knowledge and action as one.
- Type: Public
- Established: 1923; 103 years ago
- Academic affiliations: Project 211, Project 985, Double First-Class Construction
- President: Feng Xiating (冯夏庭)
- Party Secretary: Guo Hai (郭海)
- Academic staff: 4,538
- Undergraduates: 29,872
- Postgraduates: 11,364
- Doctoral students: 3,850
- Location: Shenyang, Liaoning, China
- Colors: NEU blue
- Website: english.neu.edu.cn

Chinese name
- Simplified Chinese: 东北大学
- Traditional Chinese: 東北大學
Transcriptions
Standard Mandarin
- Hanyu Pinyin: Dōngběi Dàxué

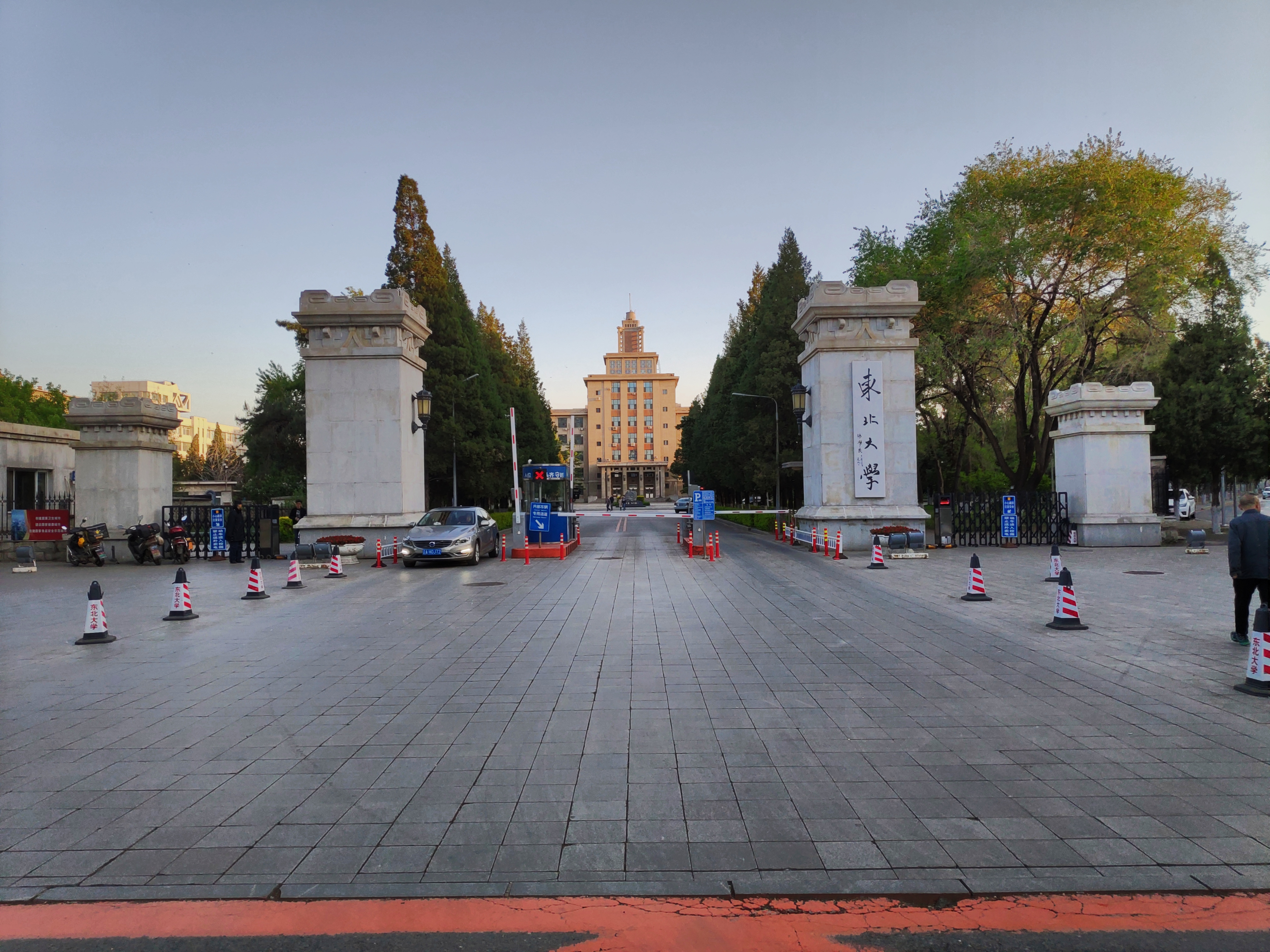
Main entrance (North gate) of the Northeastern University South Lake Campus

Northeastern University (NEU) is a public university in Shenyang, Liaoning, China. It is affiliated with the Ministry of Education, and co-funded by the Ministry of Education, SASTIND, Liaoning Provincial People's Government, and Shenyang Municipal People's Government. The university is part of Project 211, Project 985, and the Double First-Class Construction.

== History ==
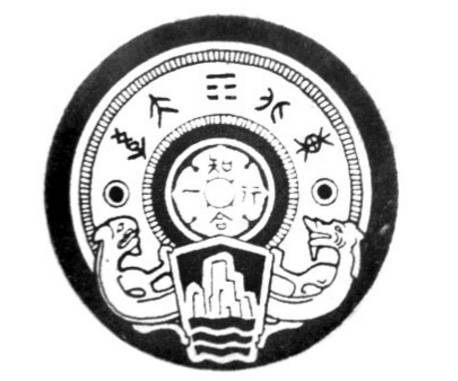
An old Northeastern University logo designed by Lin Huiyin, China's first female modern architect and faculty member in the Department of Architecture, featuring Changbai Mountain and Heilongjiang River in Northeastern China

In 1921, the parliament of Feng Tian province passed a bill on uniting Jilin and Heilongjiang province leading to the establishment of the Northeastern University. The main objective is to reserve talent and invigorate education.

In April 1923, Northeastern University was founded, with Wang Yongjiang, the then acting governor of Feng Tian Province, appointed as its first president. The university opened school of Literature and Laws at the former location of the Feng Tian Literature school, and school of science and engineering at the former Shenyang Higher Normal School.

In August 1928, General Zhang Xueliang served as the university president. In 1929, Zhang invited Liu Bannong to write the lyrics of the university song and Zhao Yuanren to compose the music. Later, the song was adapted and improved by Lv Yuan, a famous composer.

Following the Mukden incident in 1931, the Japanese army seized control of Shenyang, resulting in the university being forced into exile. In October, the university resumed academic activities in Beiping.

In 1936, the School of Engineering of Northeastern University moved to Xi'an, establishing a branch school. After the Xi'an Incident in December led to the imprisonment of university president Zhang, the Nationalist government of China appointed educator Zang Qifang as the acting president of the school in January 1937. Subsequently, in June, the school moved to Xi'an entirely.

In the spring of 1938, due to heavy bombardment on Xi'an by the Japanese Air Force and the deteriorating situation, Northeastern University moved to Santai, Sichuan.

In May 1946, following the victory in the Second Sino-Japanese War, the faculty and students of Northeastern University relocated back to Shenyang.

In March 1949, the Northeastern University was dissolved by the Northeast Administrative Commission. As the result, the School of engineering and part of the School of Science of the Northeastern University were transformed into Northeastern Engineering College, operating under the affiliation of the Ministry of Metallurgical Industry of China. The campus is located in Nanhu, Shenyang.

In 1997, the then Shenyang Gold College merged into Northeastern University.

== Academics ==
Northeastern University is the home to two national key laboratories, State Key Laboratory of Rolling and Automation, State Key Laboratory of Synthetical Automation for Process Industries and home to 4 national engineering (technology) research centers, 12 key laboratories, engineering centers and strategic research bases of Ministry of Education, 57 key laboratories, engineering centers and engineering laboratories affiliated to Liaoning Province.

There are currently 5 members of Chinese Academy of Engineering or of Sciences as full-time faculty in NEU, including Wen Bangchun (闻邦椿), Chai Tianyou (柴天佑), Wang Guodong (王国栋), Feng Xiating (冯夏庭), and Tang Lixin (唐立新).

== Campus ==
As of January 2024, Northeastern University contains 4 campuses (3 in Shenyang and 1 in Qinhuangdao).

=== Nanhu Campus ===
The main campus of Northeastern University, the Nanhu campus is located in Shenyang, Liaoning, adjacent to the southern bank of the Hun River, and bordered by Nanhu Lake to the north. The total area of the school covers 2.03 million square meters, with a building area of 1 million square meters.

=== Hunnan Campus ===
The Hunnan Campus of Northeastern University is located at 195 Chuangxin Road, Hunnan District, Shenyang City, Liaoning Province, China. It is situated 16 kilometers away from the university's Nanhu Campus. The campus covers an area of 890,000 square meters and has a planned construction area of 970,000 square meters. Currently, it has 15 buildings in use, including Teaching Building 1, the library, the information center, the life sciences building, the humanities and management building, the architecture building, the gymnasium, student dormitories 1, 2, 3, 4, and 5, the student life service center, the energy and power center, and the central substation.

=== Shenhe Campus ===
The Shenhe Campus of Northeastern University is the former Basic College of Northeastern University, which is located in the southeast of Shenyang, close to Hunnan Development Zone and 6 kilometers away from the Nanhu campus of Northeastern University. After the completion of the Hunnan campus, students at Northeastern University no longer study here. In 2015, the School of Continuing Education of Northeastern University moved here, and the Shenhe Campus of Northeastern University serves as the teaching work of continuing education such as adult education and vocational training.

=== Northeastern University at Qinhuangdao ===
The school is located in Haigang District, Qinhuangdao, Hebei and has a campus area of around 530,000 square meters. It has 849 faculty members, including 283 experienced professionals and 265 supervisors for master's and doctoral students. The university consists of the Qinhuangdao Branch of the Graduate School of Northeastern University, one Sino-foreign cooperative educational institution, and eight colleges. It offers 36 undergraduate majors in economics, law, literature, science, engineering, and management. The university shares doctoral and master's degree resources with Northeastern University and has its own master's programs in optical engineering and ethnology.

== Rankings ==
University rankings
| BCUR National | Domestic | 37 |
| Wu Shulian National | Domestic | 38 |
| CUAA National | Alumni | =29 |
| THE National | General | 38–51 |
| THE Asia (Asia version) | General | =112 |
| ARWU World | Research | 201–300 |
| THE World | General | 501–600 |
| USNWR World | General | 445 |

In 2025, the Academic Ranking of World Universities (ARWU) ranked NEU at 201-300th globally. The U.S. News & World Report Best Global University Ranking 2025 ranked NEU as #445 in the world, #111 in Asia and #58 in China.

== Bibliography ==
- 東北文化社 (1931). 東北年鑑 [Yearbook of the Northeast] (PDF) (in Chinese (Taiwan)). 東北文化社.
- Wang, Fengjie (2010). 王永江与奉天省早期现代化研究 [Wang Yongjiang and the Early Modernization Reforms of Fengtian Province] (in Chinese). 吉林大学出版社. ISBN 9787560156354.
- Guo, Jianpin (2000). 奉系军阀全书·奉系教育 [Fengtian clique - Fengtian Clique and Education] (in Chinese). 辽海出版社. ISBN 9787806492574.
- Zhang, Zaijun (2015). 东北大学往事：1931-1949 [a Memory of the Northeastern University: 1931 - 1949] (in Chinese). Jiuzhou Press. ISBN 9787806492574.
- Jiang, Liangfu (2002). 姜亮夫全集 第24卷 [Complete Works of Jiang Liangfu - Vol. 24] (in Chinese). 云南人民出版社. ISBN 9787222035195.
