= Nanjing University =

Public university in Nanjing, Jiangsu, China

Coordinates: 32°03′22″N 118°46′30″E

- 南京大学
- Former names: Sanjiang or Liangjiang Normal College (1902–1914); Nanking Higher Normal School (1915–1923); National Southeastern University (1921–1927); National Central University (1928–1949)
- Motto: 诚朴雄伟励学敦行
- Motto in English: Sincerity with Aspiration, Perseverance and Integrity
- Type: Public
- Established: 1902; 124 years ago
- Affiliations: C9, APRU, AEARU, WUN, Service-Learning Asia Network
- President: Tan Zhemin
- Academic staff: 2,197
- Undergraduates: 13,934
- Postgraduates: 12,793
- Doctoral students: 8,948
- Location: Nanjing, Jiangsu, China
- Colors: Purple
- Website: nju.edu.cn/en

Chinese name
- Simplified Chinese: 南京大学
- Traditional Chinese: 南京大學
Transcriptions
Standard Mandarin
- Hanyu Pinyin: Nánjīng Dàxué
- Bopomofo: ㄋㄢˊ ㄐㄧㄥ ㄉㄚˋ ㄒㄩㄝˊ
- Wade–Giles: Nan^{2}-ching^{1} Ta^{4}-hsüeh^{2}
- Tongyong Pinyin: Nán-jing Dà-syué
- IPA: [nǎn.tɕíŋ tâ.ɕɥě]

Nanjing University (NJU) is a public university in Nanjing and Suzhou, Jiangsu, China. It is affiliated and sponsored by the Ministry of Education. The university is part of Project 211, Project 985, and the Double First-Class Construction. The university is a member of the C9 League.

Established in 1902 as Sanjiang Normal School, Nanjing University underwent a number of name changes, such as Nanjing Higher Normal School, National Southeastern University and National Central University, until it was renamed Nanjing University in 1950. It merged with the University of Nanking in 1952.

Nanjing University has four campuses: the Xianlin campus in the northeast of Nanjing, the Gulou campus in the city center of Nanjing, the Pukou campus in the Pukou District of Nanjing, and the Suzhou campus in the city of Suzhou.

== Faculties ==
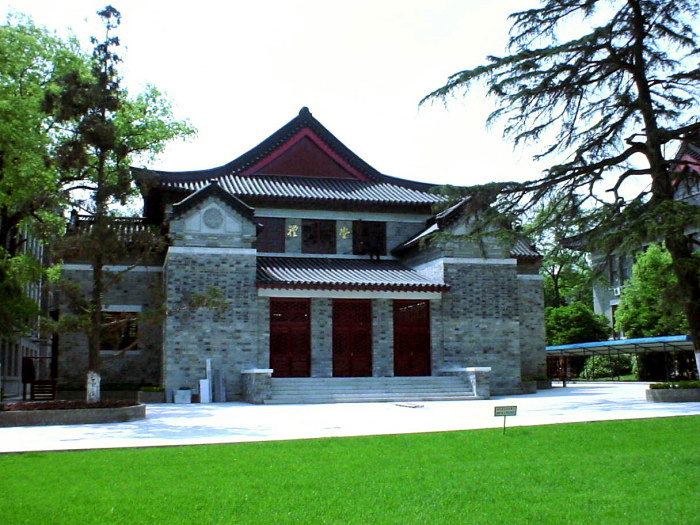
Old Great Hall (大禮堂)

Its faculty, including part-time faculty, includes more than twenty Nobel Laureates engaged in teaching. The university is a Double First-Class Construction university in 15 academic disciplines.

== Culture ==
=== Motto ===
Nanjing University's motto is "Sincerity with Aspiration, Perseverance with Integrity" (simplified Chinese: 诚朴雄伟 励学敦行; traditional Chinese: 誠樸雄偉 勵學敦行; pinyin: chéng pǔ xióng wěi lì xué dūn xíng). The first part of the motto, "Sincerity with Aspiration," originated during the university's period as the historical National Central University, while "Perseverance with Integrity" draws inspiration from classical Chinese aphorisms.

Historically, Li Ruiqing, president of Liangjiang Higher Normal School, the precursor to Nanjing University, inscribed the motto "One who chews on the roots of vegetables can accomplish great things" (Chinese: 嚼得菜根 做得大事; pinyin: jiáo dé cài gēn zuò dé dà shì). Later, during the National Central University era, President Luo Jialun formally adopted "Sincerity with Aspiration" as the university's motto. Following the establishment of the People's Republic of China in 1949, Nanjing University underwent a series of reorganizations and consolidations, and a formal motto was not established for an extended period. The current motto, "Sincerity with Aspiration, Perseverance with Integrity", was adopted during the university's centennial celebration in 2002 under the leadership of then-President Jiang Shusheng, following extensive consultation with faculty and students.

=== Song ===
The school song of Nanjing University was composed in 1916 and originally served as the school song of Nanjing Higher Normal School, with the lyrics written by Jiang Qian and melody composed by Li Shutong (Hong Yi).

== Rankings ==
University rankings
BCUR National	Domestic	6
Wu Shulian National	Domestic	10
CUAA National	Alumni	7
QS National	General	7
THE National	General	7
QS Asia (Asia version)	General	24
THE Asia (Asia version)	General	13
ARWU World	Research	70
QS World	General	=90
THE World	General	59
USNWR World	General	77

As of 2025, Nanjing University was ranked 7th in China, 14th in Asia and 68th worldwide in terms of aggregate performance from the four most widely observed university rankings (THE+ARWU+QS+US News). Nanjing University ranked 7th in China, 13th in Asia and 59th globally by the 2027 Times Higher Education World University Rankings. It also ranked 6th in China, 12th in Asia and 70th globally by the 2026 Academic Ranking of World Universities.

Regarding scientific research output, the Nature Index Annual Table 2025 ranked Nanjing University the 6th university in China and the Asia-Pacific region, and 7th in the world among global universities.

Nanjing University consistently features in the top 150 global universities as ranked by the Academic Ranking of World Universities, the QS World University Rankings, the Times Higher Education World University Rankings, and the U.S. News & World Report. The joint THE-QS World University Rankings 2007 ranked Nanjing University 4th in China (after Peking, Tsinghua and Fudan), 17th in Asia and 125th in the world. The Times Higher Education World University Rankings 2011 placed Nanjing 120th in the world, 16th in Asia and 4th in China. In 2017, Nanjing University was ranked 91–100 for World Reputation Ranking by Times Higher Education, and 114 by QS World University Rankings. In 2017, its Graduate Employability rankings placed at #101 globally in the QS Graduate Employability Rankings. Nanjing University has been consistently ranked among the top 20 universities in the world by Nature Index since 2016 by Nature Portfolio.

Chinese university ranking, conducted since 1999 by the higher education publisher Netbig, consistently ranked the university among the top 3 before 2005, and in the most recent ranking among the top 5. Academic Ranking of World Universities, conducted since 2003 by Shanghai Jiaotong University, suggested a domestic rank of number 2 to number 7.

== Academics ==
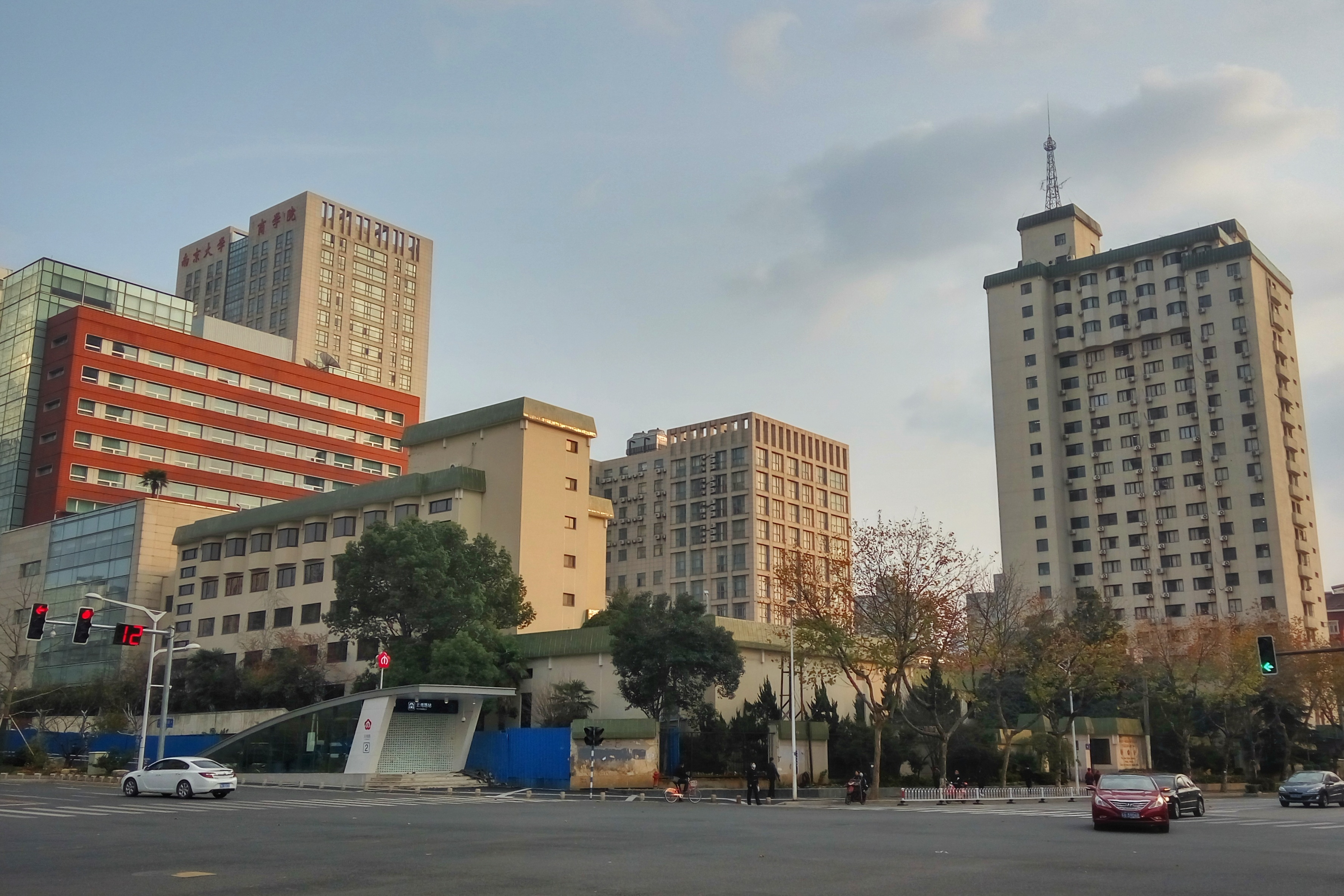
The northwestern corner of Nanjing University's Gulou campus houses most of the university's foreign students: Center for Chinese and American Studies (front left), Zeng Xianzi building (back center), Xiyuan (right).

== List of schools and departments ==
Schools, Colleges or Standalone Institutes	Departments
College of First-Year Students	Bingwen Academy
College of First-Year Students	Xingzhi Academy
College of First-Year Students	Yuxiu Academy
College of First-Year Students	Anbang Academy
College of First-Year Students	Youxun Academy
College of First-Year Students	Kaijia Academy
College of First-Year Students	Jianxiong Academy
School of Liberal Arts	Department of Ancient Chinese Literature
School of Liberal Arts	Department of Chinese Classics
School of Liberal Arts	Department of Theatre, Film and Television
School of Liberal Arts	Department of Modern and Contemporary Chinese Literature
School of Liberal Arts	Department of Comparative Literature and World Literature
School of Liberal Arts	Department of Literary Theory
School of Liberal Arts	Department of Chinese Philology
School of Liberal Arts	Department of Linguistics and Applied Linguistics
School of History	Department of Chinese History
School of History	Department of World History
School of History	Department of Archaeology and Cultural Relics
School of Philosophy	—N/a
School of Journalism and Communication	Department of Radio, Film and Television
School of Journalism and Communication	Department of Applied Communication
School of Journalism and Communication	Department of Journalism and New Media
School of Law	—N/a
School of Business	Department of Economics
School of Business	Department of International Economics
School of Business	Department of Finance and Insurance
School of Business	Department of Industrial Economics
School of Business	Population Research Institute
School of Business	Department of Business Administration
School of Business	Department of Accounting
School of Business	Department of Marketing and E-commerce
School of Business	Department of Human Resource Management
School of Foreign Studies	Department of English
School of Foreign Studies	Department of French
School of Foreign Studies	Department of German
School of Foreign Studies	Department of Russian
School of Foreign Studies	Department of Japanese
School of Foreign Studies	Department of Spanish
School of Foreign Studies	Department of Korean
School of Government	Department of Politics
School of Government	Department of Public Administration
School of Government	Department of Social Security
School of Government	Department of Emergency Management
School of International Studies	Department of International Politics
School of International Studies	Department of Diplomacy and International Affairs
School of Information Management	Department of Library and Digital Humanities
School of Information Management	Department of Archives and E-government
School of Information Management	Department of Information Management Science
School of Information Management	Department of Publishing Science
School of Social and Behavioral Sciences	Department of Sociology
School of Social and Behavioral Sciences	Department of Psychology
School of Social and Behavioral Sciences	Department of Social Work and Social Policy
School of Mathematics	—N/a
School of Physics	Department of Modern Physics
School of Physics	Department of Physics
School of Physics	Department of Optoelectronic Science
School of Physics	Department of Acoustics and Engineering
School of Physics	Center for Experimental Physics Education
School of Astronomy and Space Sciences	Department of Astronomy
School of Astronomy and Space Sciences	Department of Space Science and Technology
School of Chemistry and Chemical Engineering	Department of Chemistry
School of Chemistry and Chemical Engineering	Department of Highpolymer Science and Engineering
School of Chemistry and Chemical Engineering	Department of Chemical Engineering
School of Computer Science	—N/a
Software Institute	—N/a
School of Artificial Intelligence	—N/a
School of Electronic Science and Engineering	Department of Electronic Engineering
School of Electronic Science and Engineering	Department of Microelectronics and Optoelectronics
School of Electronic Science and Engineering	Department of Information Electronics
School of Electronic Science and Engineering	Department of Communication Engineering
College of Engineering and Applied Sciences	Department of Material Science and Engineering
College of Engineering and Applied Sciences	Department of Quantum Electronics and Optical Engineering
College of Engineering and Applied Sciences	Department of Biomedical Engineering
College of Engineering and Applied Sciences	Department of Energy Science and Engineering
School of Environment	Department of Environmental Sciences
School of Environment	Department of Environmental Engineering
School of Environment	Department of Environmental Planning and Management
School of Earth Sciences and Engineering	Department of Earth and Planetary Science
School of Earth Sciences and Engineering	Department of Hydro-science
School of Earth Sciences and Engineering	Department of Geological Engineering and Information Technology
School of Geographic and Oceanographic Sciences	Department of Physical Geography
School of Geographic and Oceanographic Sciences	Department of Land Resources and Tourism
School of Geographic and Oceanographic Sciences	Department of Geographic Information Technology
School of Geographic and Oceanographic Sciences	Department of Coastal and Oceanographic
School of Atmospheric Sciences	Department of Meteorology
School of Atmospheric Sciences	Department of Atmospheric Physics
School of Life Sciences	Department of Biology
School of Life Sciences	Department of Biochemistry
School of Life Sciences	Department of Ecology
School of Life Sciences	Department of Physiology
School of Life Sciences	Department of Biotechnology and Pharmacy
Medical School	—N/a
School of Management and Engineering	Department of Industrial Engineering and Operations Management
School of Management and Engineering	Department of Complex Project Management
School of Management and Engineering	Department of Financial Technology and Engineering
School of Management and Engineering	Department of Control Science and Intelligent Engineering
Kuang Yaming Honors School	—N/a
School of Architecture and Urban Planning	Department of Architecture
School of Architecture and Urban Planning	Department of Urban Planning and Design
School of Marxism	—N/a
School of Arts	Department of Art Theory and Creativity
School of Arts	Department of Art and Design
Education Research Institute & Tao Xingzhi Teacher Education College	—N/a
Department of Foreign Language Education	—N/a
Department of Physical Education	—N/a
Chinese Ideologue Research Center	Independent Research Institute
Institute for Advanced Studies in Humanities and Social Sciences	Independent Research Institute
Institute of Modern Biology	Independent Research Institute
Yangtze IDEL	Independent Research Institute

== Notable alumni and people ==
- Nanjing University ranks No.1 in the number of alumni elected as academicians of Chinese Academy of Sciences and/or Chinese Academy of Engineering graduated in recent more than 30 years since college admission entrance examination system was recovered in 1977 after Cultural Revolution.
- In the first time Examination for senior civil service post of Republic of China (as recovery of and equivalent to Imperial examination) in 1931, top 100 were selected, all were males, among them 25 are graduates of Nanjing University, including Zhuangyuan (principal graduate) Chow Bangdao, who was later president of China Medical College and Political Deputy Ministry of Examination, ROC, and the school in the second place is Peking University, with 8 graduates. In the second time exam held in 1933, there were females passed, half of whom graduated from Nanjing University, as well as Zhuangyuan Lee Hsuehteng, who graduated from law school and later became Chief Justice of ROC Supreme Court. One-fourth of Chief Justices in the early 60 more years of Republic of China are National Central University (Nanjing University) alumni.
- Of 53 first-time elected academicians of Academia Sinica in natural science including mathematics, 28 were graduates or once faculty members of Nanjing University.

== See also ==
- Guozijian
- National Central University
