= Rankings of universities in China =

Status of higher education in China

As of 2025, China had the world's highest number of top universities in several international rankings including the Academic Ranking of World Universities (ARWU), the US News and World Report Best Global University Ranking, the Center for World University Rankings (CWUR), the University Ranking by Academic Performance, the CWTS Leiden Ranking, and the SCImago Institutions Rankings.

Universities and colleges being part of the Double First-Class Construction (147 public universities nationwide) are considered to be the most elite institutions of Chinese tertiary education, representing the top 5% of overall universities and colleges in Mainland China (approximately 3,000 higher education institutions). Regardless of universities in China being involved in a variety of university rankings, the Ministry of Education of China does not advocate or recognize any ranking published by other institutions.

== Rankings distribution ==
=== Global ===
As of 2026, China had the world's highest number of top universities in the Academic Ranking of World Universities (ARWU), the US News and World Report Best Global University Ranking, the Center for World University Rankings (CWUR), the University Ranking by Academic Performance, the CWTS Leiden Ranking, and the SCImago Institutions Rankings.

China topped the list with 257 out of 1,000 universities in the 2026 Academic Ranking of World Universities (ARWU). The U.S. News & World Report Best Global Universities Ranking 2026-2027 ranked 2250 universities from more than 100 countries/regions: China was again top with 409. China topped the list with 360 out of 2,000 universities in the 2026 Center for World University Rankings (CWUR). The University Ranking by Academic Performance 2025-2026 shortlisted 3,000 research universities in the ranking: China topped the list, with 509 universities. In the 2025 CWTS Leiden Ranking, China had the largest number of universities including in the ranking with 365 out of 1,594 universities from more than 77 countries/regions. China was also the most-represented nation overall in the SCImago Institutions Rankings 2025 list with 634 universities. More than 2,500 universities in China are ranked in the Webometrics Ranking of World Universities out of almost 31,000 institutions, including in the ranking worldwide.

There were 115 universities from Mainland China on lists of the global top 500 in the 2026 Shanghai Ranking's ARWU, the highest among all countries in terms of the overall representation. Among them, Mainland China had 6 and 11 universities listed within the global top 50 and global top 100, respectively, second only to the United States. In the 2026 U.S. News Global University Rankings, 11 universities from Mainland China were included in the global top 100, ranking second only to the United States. In the same ranking, Mainland China had one university in the global top 10 and two universities ranked in the global top 20, trailing only the US and the UK. In the 2026 Times Higher Education World University Rankings, Mainland China had a notable presence with 2 universities listed within the global top 15. This positioning placed Mainland China behind only the United States (9) and the United Kingdom (3) in terms of overall representation. As of 2025, there were 2 Chinese universities in the global top 20, 5 in the top 50, and 19 in the top 200, behind only the United States and the United Kingdom in terms of the overall representation in the Aggregate Ranking of Top Universities, a composite ranking system combining three of the world's most influential university rankings (ARWU+QS+ THE).

=== Regional ===
China has dominated the QS BRICS University Rankings and the THE's Emerging Economies University Rankings since their inception, claiming 7 of the top 10 spots for both rankings. China is also the most-represented nation overall. In 2020, China tops the QS Asia University Rankings list with over 120 universities including in the ranking, and five Chinese universities appear in the Asia Top 10, which is more than any other country. As of 2024, the Academic Ranking of World Universities (ARWU) included a total of 13 universities from China within its world top 100 list. Similarly, the Times Higher Education Rankings also featured four and seven universities from China within its global top 40 and top 100 lists, respectively. Notably, this level of representation in both rankings positioned China as the country with the highest overall presence in the Asia & Oceania region.

=== National ===
China is home to over 3,000 institutions of higher education. Within this vast landscape, around 147 universities as part of the Double First-Class Construction hold a prominent position as national key universities, while the tier 1 universities consist of the former 985 Project Universities. These universities are widely recognized as some of the most renowned in China and continuously maintain high rankings nationally and globally.

In terms of city representation, according to the U.S. News & World Report Best Global University Ranking for 2026, Beijing has the highest number of universities included in the ranking, totaling 31, followed by Shanghai (24) and Xi'an (20), while Nanjing has 18 and Wuhan has 16. Other major cities with notable representation include Hangzhou (14), Chengdu (13), Guangzhou (12), Tianjin (11), Harbin (11), Shenyang (10), Nanchang (10), Changsha (9), Dalian (9), Chongqing (8), Jinan (8), Zhengzhou (8), Hefei (8), Kunming (7), Qingdao (7), and Changchun (7).

==== Rankings of universities in China ====
There are several comprehensive rankings of universities in China, including Wu Shulian Ranking, made by a team led by Wu Shulian and published in the name of Chinese Academy of Management, Netbig Ranking, made by the higher education internet information company Netbig, and CUAA Ranking, by Airuishen (a company) in the name of Chinese Universities Alumni Association, etc. Shanghai Ruanke compiles both the Best Chinese Universities Ranking (BCUR) and the world university ranking, Academic Ranking of World Universities.

In 1987, a ranking of 86 key universities according to Science Citation Index was compiled by Xiao Ming, Chinese Academy of Management Science.

It's said that the first comprehensive (exactly, synthetic) ranking of Chinese universities was made by Cai Yanhou, Higher Education Research Institute, Central South University of Technology, in 1989. Colleges and universities were ranked in four categories, science (generally comprehensive universities), engineering, agricultural and medical.

The Chinese university ranking on research and development in 1991 was published in 1993 by Wu Shulian, Guangdong Academy of Management Science, which was registered in the year 1993 as a private institute and later ceased and was claimed to be the Guangdong branch of Chinese Academy of Management Science. The 1996 ranking was released in 1997, and since then the annual ranking has been released continuously. It's a single list ranking except 1998 ranking, which consists of comprehensive university ranking and technological university ranking, with Nanjing University and Tsinghua University ranking 1st respectively. In 2000, the comprehensive ranking was released under the name Chinese University Assessment. The ranking was later published in the name of Chinese Academy of Management Science.

In 1998, Netbig, or literally Net Universities in abbreviation, a higher education internet information company, released Chinese university ranking.

In 2002, Chinese university ranking by Airuishen (a company) was released. The CUAA Ranking, released in the name of Chinese Universities Alumni Association, is said made by Cai Yanhou team.

In 2003, a team in Shanghai Jiaotong University, later named Shanghai Ranking (Shanghai Ruanke, literally Shanghai Soft Science in abbreviation), released Academic Ranking of World Universities. Shanghai Ranking also compiles the Best Chinese Universities Ranking (BCUR).

== Major International Rankings ==
=== Bibliometric-based rankings ===
Annual international rankings of the bibliometric-based rankings include the Academic Ranking of World Universities, the Performance Ranking of Scientific Papers for World Universities, the University Ranking by Academic Performance, the CWTS Leiden Ranking, the SCImago Institutions Rankings, the Center for World University Rankings (CWUR), and the Nature Index Annual Tables published by Nature Research.

==== Shanghai Ranking's Academic Ranking of World Universities (ARWU) ====
Institution	2026 World Ranking
Tsinghua University	18
Peking University	22
Zhejiang University	24
Shanghai Jiao Tong University	27
University of Science and Technology of China	39
Fudan University	41
Sun Yat-sen University	62
Nanjing University	70
Huazhong University of Science and Technology	72
Sichuan University	77
Wuhan University	77
Xi'an Jiaotong University	79
Central South University	83
Southeast University	89
Harbin Institute of Technology	97
Tianjin University	98
Beihang University	101-150
Beijing Institute of Technology	101-150
Beijing Normal University	101-150
Jilin University	101-150
Nankai University	101-150
Shandong University	101-150
Soochow University (Suzhou)	101-150
South China University of Technology	101-150
Southern University of Science and Technology	101-150
Tongji University	101-150
Xiamen University	101-150
China Agricultural University	151-200
Chongqing University	151-200
Dalian University of Technology	151-200
Hunan University	151-200
Northwestern Polytechnical University	151-200
Peking Union Medical College	151-200
Shenzhen University	151-200
University of Electronic Science and Technology of China	151-200
Zhengzhou University	151-200
Beijing University of Chemical Technology	201-300
Beijing University of Technology	201-300
Capital Medical University	201-300
China University of Geosciences	201-300
East China Normal University	201-300
East China University of Science and Technology	201-300
Fuzhou University	201-300
Huazhong Agricultural University	201-300
Jiangsu University	201-300
Jinan University	201-300
Lanzhou University	201-300
Nanjing Agricultural University	201-300
Nanjing Medical University	201-300
Nanjing Tech University	201-300
Nanjing University of Aeronautics and Astronautics	201-300
Nanjing University of Science & Technology	201-300
Northeastern University (Shenyang)	201-300
Ocean University of China	201-300
ShanghaiTech University	201-300
Southern Medical University	201-300
University of Science and Technology Beijing	201-300
Westlake University	201-300
Wuhan University of Technology	201-300
Yangzhou University	201-300
Zhejiang University of Technology	201-300
Anhui Medical University	301-400
Anhui University	301-400
China University of Petroleum (East China)	301-400
Chongqing Medical University	301-400
Fujian Medical University	301-400
Guangdong University of Technology	301-400
Guangxi University	301-400
Guangzhou Medical University	301-400
Guizhou University	301-400
Hainan University	301-400
Henan University	301-400
Hohai University	301-400
Jiangnan University	301-400
Nanchang University	301-400
Nanjing Normal University	301-400
Nanjing University of Information Science & Technology	301-400
Nanjing University of Posts and Telecommunications	301-400
National University of Defense Technology	301-400
Ningbo University	301-400
Northwest A&F University	301-400
Qingdao University	301-400
Renmin University of China	301-400
Shanghai University	301-400
Southwest Jiaotong University	301-400
Southwest University	301-400
University of Shanghai for Science and Technology	301-400
Wenzhou Medical University	301-400
Xidian University	301-400
Yunnan University	301-400
Beijing Jiaotong University	401-500
China University of Geosciences Beijing	401-500
China University of Mining and Technology	401-500
China University of Petroleum, Beijing	401-500
Donghua University	401-500
Fujian Agriculture and Forestry University	401-500
Guangzhou University	401-500
Harbin Engineering University	401-500
Hefei University of Technology	401-500
Kunming University of Science and Technology	401-500
Nanjing Forestry University	401-500
Nanjing University of Chinese Medicine	401-500
Nantong University	401-500
North China Electric Power University	401-500
Northeast Forestry University	401-500
Northwest University	401-500
Shaanxi Normal University	401-500
Shandong First Medical University	401-500
Shanxi University	401-500
South China Agricultural University	401-500
South China Normal University	401-500
Taiyuan University of Technology	401-500
The Chinese University of Hong Kong, Shenzhen	401-500
Tianjin Medical University	401-500
Yanshan University	401-500
Army Medical University	501-600
Central China Normal University	501-600
Chang'an University	501-600
China Medical University (Shenyang)	501-600
China University of Mining and Technology-Beijing	501-600
Fujian Normal University	501-600
Hangzhou Dianzi University	501-600
Hebei University	501-600
Hebei University of Technology	501-600
Jiangsu University of Science and Technology	501-600
Northeast Agricultural University	501-600
Northeast Normal University	501-600
Qingdao University of Science & Technology	501-600
Sichuan Agricultural University	501-600
University of South China	501-600
Wenzhou University	501-600
Xi'an University of Technology	501-600
Zhejiang Chinese Medical University	501-600
Zhejiang Normal University	501-600
Zhejiang Sci-Tech University	501-600
Air Force Medical University	601-700
Anhui Agricultural University	601-700
Beijing Forestry University	601-700
Beijing University of Posts and Telecommunications	601-700
Chengdu University of Technology	601-700
China Pharmaceutical University	601-700
Eastern Institute of Technology, Ningbo	601-700
Hangzhou Normal University	601-700
Harbin Medical University	601-700
Heilongjiang University	601-700
Henan University of Science and Technology	601-700
Henan University of Technology	601-700
Hunan Normal University	601-700
Qilu University of Technology	601-700
Shandong Normal University	601-700
Shandong University of Science and Technology	601-700
Shanghai Normal University	601-700
Shanghai Ocean University	601-700
Shanghai University of Traditional Chinese Medicine	601-700
Shanxi Medical University	601-700
Southwest Medical University	601-700
Suzhou University of Science and Technology	601-700
Tiangong University	601-700
Tianjin University of Technology	601-700
Wuhan Institute of Technology	601-700
Xinjiang University	601-700
Xuzhou Medical University	601-700
Anhui University of Technology	701-800
Changzhou University	701-800
Chongqing University of Posts and Telecommunications	701-800
Dalian Maritime University	701-800
Dalian Polytechnic University	701-800
Guangxi Medical University	701-800
Guangzhou University of Chinese Medicine	701-800
Hangzhou City University	701-800
Hebei Medical University	701-800
Henan Normal University	701-800
Hunan Agricultural University	701-800
Jilin Agricultural University	701-800
Kunming Medical University	701-800
Naval Medical University	701-800
North China University of Water Resources and Electric Power	701-800
Qingdao Agricultural University	701-800
Shantou University	701-800
Shenyang Pharmaceutical University	701-800
Southwest Petroleum University	701-800
Southwest University of Science and Technology	701-800
Southwestern University of Finance and Economics	701-800
Wuhan University of Science and Technology	701-800
Xi'an Jiaotong-Liverpool University	701-800
Xi'an University of Architecture and Technology	701-800
Xiangtan University	701-800
Zhejiang A&F University	701-800
Beijing Information Science & Technology University	801-900
Beijing Technology and Business University	801-900
Changsha University of Science & Technology	801-900
Dalian Medical University	801-900
Guangxi Normal University	801-900
Lanzhou University of Technology	801-900
North University of China	801-900
Shandong Agricultural University	801-900
Shandong University of Technology	801-900
Shenyang University of Technology	801-900
Shenzhen University of Advanced Technology	801-900
Shihezi University	801-900
Taiyuan University of Science and Technology	801-900
The Hong Kong University of Science and Technology (Guangzhou)	801-900
Tianjin University of Science and Technology	801-900
University of Jinan	801-900
Wuhan Textile University	801-900
Yangtze University	801-900
Anhui University of Science & Technology	901-1000
Beijing University of Chinese Medicine	901-1000
Bengbu Medical University	901-1000
Central University of Finance and Economics	901-1000
Chengdu University of Traditional Chinese Medicine	901-1000
China Jiliang University	901-1000
East China Jiaotong University	901-1000
Guilin University of Electronic Technology	901-1000
Hainan Medical University	901-1000
Hangzhou Medical College	901-1000
Henan Agricultural University	901-1000
Henan Polytechnic University	901-1000
Huaqiao University	901-1000
Hubei University	901-1000
Inner Mongolia University	901-1000
Jiangxi Normal University	901-1000
Jimei University	901-1000
Ningxia University	901-1000
Northeast Electric Power University	901-1000
Qingdao University of Technology	901-1000
Qinghai University	901-1000
Shaanxi University of Science & Technology	901-1000
Shanghai University of Finance and Economics	901-1000
Xi'an University of Science and Technology	901-1000
Xihua University	901-1000
Xinjiang Medical University	901-1000
Yantai University	901-1000
Zhongnan University of Economics and Law	901-1000

==== University Ranking By Academic Performance (URAP) ====
A complete ranking of 507 Chinese universities, including in the top 3,000 universities worldwide, can be found through the external link according to the University Ranking by Academic Performance 2025-2026.

University	2025-2026 World Ranking
Zhejiang University	2
Shanghai Jiao Tong University	3
Tsinghua University	4
Peking University	8
Sun Yat Sen University	10
Huazhong University of Science & Technology	12
Central South University	17
Fudan University	18
Sichuan University	19
University of Science & Technology of China, CAS	24
Xi'an Jiaotong University	25
Harbin Institute of Technology	32
Wuhan University	33
Zhengzhou University	39
Shandong University	41
Tongji University	43
Southeast University - China	44
Tianjin University	46
Nanjing University	54
South China University of Technology	56
Jilin University	67
Chongqing University	72
University of Electronic Science & Technology of China	74
Shenzhen University	75
Beijing Institute of Technology	77
Northwestern Polytechnical University	81
Beihang University	98
Soochow University - China	99
Dalian University of Technology	100
Xiamen University	103
China University of Geosciences	107
Hunan University	111
Southern University of Science & Technology	120
Jiangsu University	122
Nankai University	124
Capital Medical University	134
University of Science & Technology Beijing	148
Beijing Normal University	154
Northeastern University - China	159
China University of Petroleum	173
Peking Union Medical College	174
Shanghai University	175
Jinan University	177
China University of Mining & Technology	179
Wuhan University of Technology	180
Qingdao University	182
Southern Medical University - China	187
Lanzhou University	191
Jiangnan University	196
Nanjing Medical University	202
Nanjing University of Science & Technology	203
Nanjing University of Aeronautics & Astronautics	210
Northwest A&F University - China	220
Southwest Jiaotong University	223
Xidian University	227
Nanjing Forestry University	231
Guangdong University of Technology	233
East China Normal University	235
Fuzhou University	236
Nanchang University	237
Yangzhou University	243
Beijing University of Technology	249
Guangxi University	250
Hohai University	253
Nanjing Tech University	263
Beijing University of Chemical Technology	267
Zhejiang University of Technology	271
Ocean University of China	272
Southwest University - China	276
Nanjing University of Information Science & Technology	282
East China University of Science & Technology	288
Ningbo University	301
Nanjing Agricultural University	306
Hefei University of Technology	318
Huazhong Agricultural University	321
Beijing Jiaotong University	331
Wenzhou Medical University	335
Donghua University	340
Kunming University of Science & Technology	345
Guangzhou University	350
Guangzhou Medical University	355
South China Agricultural University	361
North China Electric Power University	368
Nanjing Normal University	372
Henan University	376
South China Normal University	381
University of Shanghai for Science & Technology	387
Hainan University	391
Harbin Engineering University	400
Shandong University of Science & Technology	403
Chang'an University	404
Guizhou University	405
Beijing University of Posts & Telecommunications	406
Nanjing University of Posts & Telecommunications	410
National University of Defense Technology - China	419
Anhui University	421
Hebei University of Technology	438
Northwest University Xi'an	442
Tianjin Medical University	449
Taiyuan University of Technology	453
China Medical University	454
Yunnan University	464
Anhui Medical University	466
Qingdao University of Science & Technology	479
Nantong University	480
Fujian Medical University	488
ShanghaiTech University	493
Shaanxi Normal University	502
Beijing Forestry University	503
Qilu University of Technology	506
Zhejiang Normal University	509
Yanshan University	526
University of Jinan	537
Hangzhou Dianzi University	541
Wuhan University of Science & Technology	548
Shantou University	559
Dalian Maritime University	562
The Chinese University of Hong Kong, Shenzhen	565
Fujian Agriculture & Forestry University	566
Xi'an University of Technology	567
Harbin Medical University	570
Zhejiang Sci-Tech University	571
Shanxi University	572
Shandong Normal University	576
Renmin University of China	577
Xi'an University of Architecture & Technology	581
Jiangsu University of Science & Technology	591
Xinjiang University	601
Northeast Agricultural University - China	612
Shaanxi University of Science & Technology	613
Wenzhou University	616
Fujian Normal University	618
Sichuan Agricultural University	620
Hunan Normal University	621
Southwest Petroleum University	626
Northeast Normal University - China	630
Northeast Forestry University - China	633
Hangzhou Normal University	638
Chengdu University	639
Chengdu University of Technology	642
Henan Normal University	657
Changzhou University	671
Beijing Technology & Business University	673
University of South China	674
Tiangong University	677
Xiangtan University	688
Henan Polytechnic University	692
China Pharmaceutical University	693
Hebei University	698
Hubei University	702
Henan University of Science & Technology	705
Southwest University of Science & Technology - China	712
Liaocheng University	720
Chongqing University of Posts & Telecommunications	729
Suzhou University of Science & Technology	736
Zhejiang A&F University	737
Lanzhou University of Technology	741
Yantai University	756
Shandong University of Technology	758
North University of China	759
Shanxi Medical University	769
Qingdao University of Technology	771
Xi'an University of Science & Technology	772
Henan Agricultural University	783
Hunan Agricultural University	788
Wuhan Institute of Technology	790
Guilin University of Electronic Technology	791
Huaqiao University	793
Guangxi Medical University	795
Zhejiang Chinese Medical University	800
Chengdu University of Traditional Chinese Medicine	803
Qufu Normal University	810
Shanghai Ocean University	815
Yangtze University	816
Xuzhou Medical University	820
Shandong Agricultural University	825
Peking University Shenzhen Graduate School (PKU Shenzhen)	836
Tianjin University of Science & Technology	838
Foshan University	845
China Three Gorges University	849
Hebei Medical University	857
Anhui Agricultural University	865
Tianjin University of Technology	868
China Jiliang University	869
Shanghai Maritime University	873
Jiangxi University of Science & Technology	878
Guilin University of Technology	887
Southwest Medical University	889
Zhejiang Gongshang University	896
Hubei University of Technology	902
Jiangxi Normal University	905
Shanghai Normal University	907
Southwestern University of Finance & Economics - China	908
Dalian Medical University	910
Anhui University of Technology	911
Shihezi University	915
Xi'an Jiaotong-Liverpool University	916
Dongguan University of Technology	927
Ningxia University	943
Huzhou University	946
Guangxi Normal University	949
Inner Mongolia University	954
Qingdao Agricultural University	955
Hunan University of Science & Technology	960
Henan University of Technology	962
Shanghai University of Engineering Science	963
Anhui University of Science & Technology	974
Central South University of Forestry & Technology	982
Dalian Polytechnic University	988
Northwest Normal University - China	989
Kunming Medical University	993
University of Nottingham Ningbo China	1016
Wuhan Textile University	1029
Heilongjiang University	1035
Anhui Normal University	1047
Guizhou Medical University	1049
Hebei Agricultural University	1053
Chongqing Jiaotong University	1059
Capital Normal University	1066
Harbin University of Science & Technology	1076
Guangdong Ocean University	1091
Jilin Agricultural University	1097
Zhengzhou University of Light Industry	1100
Guangdong Medical University	1102
Changchun University of Science & Technology	1104
Lanzhou Jiaotong University	1109
Shenyang University of Technology	1118
Shaoxing University	1125
Zhejiang Ocean University	1138
Shenyang Agricultural University	1144
Hainan Medical University	1146
Jimei University	1148
Jiangsu Normal University	1149
East China Jiaotong University	1151
Sichuan Normal University	1155
Xi'an Technological University	1156
Jiaxing University	1157
North China University of Science & Technology	1159
Nanchang Hangkong University	1160
Chongqing University of Technology	1187
Xihua University	1188
Zunyi Medical University	1194
Taizhou University	1195
Jiangxi Agricultural University	1202
Shenyang Pharmaceutical University	1203
Taiyuan University of Science & Technology	1223
Qinghai University	1227
Yancheng Institute of Technology	1230
Shanghai University of Electric Power	1239
Binzhou Medical University	1240
Liaoning University	1246
Nanjing University of Finance & Economics	1248
Shanghai University of Finance & Economics	1251
Northeast Petroleum University	1252
Northeast Electric Power University	1253
Shanxi Agricultural University	1255
Zhongnan University of Economics & Law	1258
Tianjin Normal University	1264
Shandong Jianzhu University	1265
Anhui Polytechnic University	1271
Linyi University	1281
Gansu Agricultural University	1282
Bohai University	1284
Shanghai Institute of Technology	1294
Chongqing Normal University	1305
Ludong University	1306
Guangdong Pharmaceutical University	1317
University of International Business & Economics	1320
Xi'an University of Posts & Telecommunications	1321
Shenzhen Technology University	1325
East China University of Technology	1327
Shandong Second Medical University	1331
Chongqing Technology & Business University	1337
Xinjiang Medical University	1340
Hebei Normal University	1349
University of Science & Technology Liaoning	1350
Wuhan Polytechnic University	1354
Wuyi University	1364
Hebei University of Science & Technology	1366
South Central Minzu University	1368
Inner Mongolia Agricultural University	1374
Ningxia Medical University	1376
Yunnan Normal University	1392
Jianghan University	1402
Hubei University of Medicine	1404
Chengdu University of Information Technology	1409
Minjiang University	1415
Huaiyin Institute of Technology	1431
Central University of Finance & Economics	1434
Zhejiang University of Science & Technology	1437
Shenzhen Polytechnic University	1448
Southwest Forestry University - China	1450
Liaoning Normal University	1459
Fujian University of Technology	1461
Hebei University of Engineering	1485
Changchun University of Technology	1489
Sichuan University of Science & Engineering	1493
Xi'an Polytechnic University	1494
Yanan University	1495
Harbin Normal University	1496
North Minzu University	1498
Chongqing University of Science & Technology	1500
Yunnan Agricultural University	1503
Liaoning Technical University	1517
Xinyang Normal University	1520
Beijing Information Science & Technology University	1542
Nanjing Institute of Technology	1546
Hunan University of Technology	1552
Hunan University of Chinese Medicine	1563
Hangzhou City University	1571
Guizhou Normal University	1586
China West Normal University	1588
Shenyang Aerospace University	1607
Shanxi Normal University	1616
Xi'an Shiyou University	1620
Inner Mongolia University of Technology	1621
Xiamen University of Technology	1637
Bengbu Medical University	1647
Guangxi Minzu University	1652
Shandong University of Finance & Economics	1663
Guangdong University of Foreign Studies	1667
Southwest Minzu University	1668
Anhui Jianzhu University	1675
Jiangsu Ocean University	1679
Hubei University of Arts & Science	1695
Civil Aviation University of China	1696
Huaibei Normal University	1699
Yanbian University	1703
Shijiazhuang Tiedao University	1704
Wannan Medical College	1712
Suzhou University of Technology	1714
Jiangxi University of Finance & Economics	1715
Jilin Normal University	1717
Tianjin Chengjian University	1727
Inner Mongolia University of Science & Technology	1732
Hainan Normal University	1735
Anhui University of Finance & Economics	1736
Capital University of Economics & Business	1750
Anhui University of Chinese Medicine	1775
Xi'an Medical University	1776
Jishou University	1778
Jining Medical University	1779
Zhongyuan University of Technology	1786
Xuzhou University of Technology	1788
Zhejiang University of Finance & Economics	1797
Guangxi University of Science & Technology	1798
Dongbei University of Finance & Economics	1799
North China University of Technology	1820
Hong Kong University of Science & Technology (Guangzhou)	1821
Henan Institute of Science & Technology	1836
Ningbo University of Technology	1837
Liaoning Petrochemical University	1840
Hubei Normal University	1841
Jiangsu University of Technology	1845
Shenyang University of Chemical Technology	1849
Henan University of Traditional Chinese Medicine	1851
Qiqihar University	1856
Tianjin University of Commerce	1862
Minzu University of China	1867
Guilin Medical University	1871
Duke Kunshan University	1877
Jinzhou Medical University	1890
Xizang University	1892
Dalian Minzu University	1893
Shanghai University of Sport	1907
Xinjiang Agricultural University	1913
Gannan Medical University	1916
Zhejiang Shuren University	1929
Chongqing University of Arts & Sciences	1943
Hubei University of Science & Technology	1966
Guangdong Polytechnic Normal University	1967
Dalian University	1968
Hubei University of Automotive Technology	1984
Hunan University of Technology & Business	1986
Liaoning University of Technology	1987
Huaiyin Normal University	1996
Nanjing Audit University	2002
Jiangxi University of Water Resources & Electric Power	2025
Jiangxi Science & Technology Normal University	2041
Dali University	2049
Luoyang Normal University	2051
Xijing University	2064
Guangdong Technion Israel Institute of Technology	2069
Gannan Normal University	2076
Shaanxi University of Technology	2084
Yangtze Normal University	2098
Shenyang Jianzhu University	2100
Beijing Normal-Hong Kong Baptist University	2104
Inner Mongolia Medical University	2109
Hubei University of Chinese Medicine	2110
Dalian Jiaotong University	2116
Wuhan Naval University of Engineering	2120
Qinghai Normal University	2124
Nanjing Xiaozhuang University	2125
Shaanxi University of Chinese Medicine	2142
Changsha University	2183
Shenzhen University of Information Technology	2184
Nanyang Normal University	2189
Tarim University	2191
Nanning Normal University	2194
Guangxi University of Chinese Medicine	2197
Shandong Technology & Business University	2201
Chongqing Three Gorges University	2206
Guizhou University of Finance & Economics	2209
Heilongjiang Bayi Agricultural University	2220
Jilin Jianzhu University	2238
MinNan Normal University	2243
Shenyang Normal University	2244
Baoji University of Arts & Sciences	2248
NingboTech University	2249
Fujian University of Traditional Chinese Medicine	2275
Yancheng Teachers University	2276
Hubei Polytechnic University	2279
Shanghai Polytechnic University	2310
Huanggang Normal University	2314
Harbin University of Commerce	2329
Dalian Ocean University	2332
Guangdong University of Finance & Economics	2337
Weifang University of Science & Technology	2347
Hefei University	2350
Beijing Normal University Zhuhai	2351
Guizhou Minzu University	2358
Shandong Jiaotong University	2370
Beihua University	2372
Hunan Institute of Engineering	2377
Jiujiang University	2386
Chuzhou University	2392
Hunan Institute of Science & Technology	2397
Hebei GEO University	2400
Zhoukou Normal University	2401
Changzhou Institute of Technology	2408
Hubei Engineering University	2410
Communication University of China	2426
Beijing Institute of Petrochemical Technology	2438
Inner Mongolia Normal University	2444
Beibu Gulf University	2446
Yunnan Minzu University	2449
Shanxi Datong University	2464
Huizhou University	2465
Dezhou University	2468
Neijiang Normal University	2469
Shanghai International Studies University	2490
Anhui Science & Technology University	2493
Hubei Minzu University	2494
Shenyang Ligong University	2501
Weifang University	2513
Inner Mongolia Minzu University	2516
Yunnan University of Finance & Economics	2520
Fuyang Normal University	2522
Yunnan University of Chinese Medicine	2528
Shaoguan University	2530
Beijing Union University	2531
Tianjin Agricultural University	2537
Jinling Institute of Technology	2542
Guizhou Institute of Technology	2544
Anqing Normal University	2547
Zhejiang Wanli University	2551
Hunan City University	2552
Jinggangshan University	2570
Putian University	2584
Shandong University of Aeronautics	2597
Hebei North University	2610
Jilin University of Chemical Technology	2615
Hengyang Normal University	2617
Jiamusi University	2620
LingNan Normal University	2625
Shenzhen MSU-BIT University	2626
Qujing Normal University	2632
Xuchang University	2638
Shanghai Dianji University	2639
Panzhihua University	2648
Jingdezhen Ceramic University	2650
Xinjiang Normal University	2665
Shangqiu Normal University	2679
Guizhou Education University	2680
Yulin Normal University	2694
Eastern Institute of Technology, Ningbo	2700
Yulin University	2703
Changchun Normal University	2728
Changchun University	2743
Lishui University	2752
Wuxi University	2764
Nanyang Institute of Technology	2768
Tongren University	2769
Wuyi University, Fujian	2772
Zaozhuang University	2777
Jingchu University of Technology	2793
Tianjin University of Finance & Economics	2799
Taishan University	2800
Kunming University	2802
Wuchang University of Technology	2803
Luoyang Institute of Science & Technology	2809
Yibin University	2811
Zhaoqing University	2812
Hebei Normal University of Science & Technology	2814
Hefei Normal University	2824
Hunan University of Arts & Science	2834
Qiannan Normal University of Nationalities	2852
Wenzhou University of Technology	2858
Shenyang Medical College	2872
North China Institute Science & Technology	2874
Tianjin University of Technology & Education	2885
Xizang Agricultural & Animal Husbandry University	2904
Henan University of Urban Construction	2936
Qinghai Minzu University	2946
Qiqihar Medical University	2969
Hezhou University	2995

==== WURI Global Top 100 Innovative Universities Rankings ====
Global Ranking (Note: Order shown in accordance with the latest result.)
Institution	2021	2022
Tsinghua University	14	15
Peking University	28	31
Cheung Kong Graduate School of Business	33	34
Beijing Normal University	36	37
Beijing Technology and Business University	63	76
Dalian Neusoft University of Information	97	91
University of International Business and Economics	101-200	101-200
Huazhong University of Science and Technology	-	101-200
Zhejiang Hupan Entrepreneurship Research Center	101-200	201-300
Southern University of Science and Technology	-	201-300
Xi'an Jiaotong University	-	201-300
Beijing Institute of Technology	201-300	201-300
Zhejiang University	-	201-300
Xinyang Vocational and Technical College	-	201-300
Fudan University	-	201-300
Tianjin University	-	201-300
China Europe International Business School	201-300	201-300
Harbin Institute of Technology	-	201-300
Nankai University	-	201-300
Tongji University	-	201-300
Wuhan University	-	201-300
Nanjing University	-	201-300
Shanghai Jiao Tong University	-	201-300
Sun Yat-sen University	-	201-300
University of Science and Technology of China	-	201-300

==== CSRankings: Computer Science Rankings ====
National Ranking (Note: Only displays Top 10 and orders shown in accordance with the latest result.)
Institution	2022	2023
Tsinghua University	1	1
Peking University	2	2
Shanghai Jiao Tong University	3	3
Zhejiang University	4	4
Nanjing University	6	6
Fudan University	7	7
University of Science and Technology of China	9	8
Renmin University of China	8	8
Harbin Institute of Technology	9	10
Beihang University	10	11

==== AIRankings: AI Institute and Author Rankings by Publications ====
National Ranking
Institution	2022	2023
Peking University	1	1
Tsinghua University	2	2
Zhejiang University	3	4
Chinese University of Hong Kong	5	5
Shanghai Jiao Tong University	7	6
Hong Kong University of Science and Technology	6	7
Nanjing University	8	8
Fudan University	9	9
Sun Yat-sen University	10	10

=== Opinion-based rankings ===
A number of international publications formulate their rankings using the weighted average of opinions gathered in surveys, including the QS World University Rankings, the Times Higher Education World University Rankings and the U.S. News and World Report Best Global University Ranking.

==== QS World University Rankings ====
Institution	2025 World Rankings
Peking University	14
Tsinghua University	20
Fudan University	39
Shanghai Jiao Tong University	45
Zhejiang University	47
University of Science and Technology of China	133
Nanjing University	145
Tongji University	192
Wuhan University	194
Harbin Institute of Technology	252
Tianjin University	269
Beijing Normal University	271
Southern University of Science and Technology	284
Xi'an Jiaotong University	295
Huazhong University of Science and Technology	300
Beijing Institute of Technology	302
Shandong University	316
Sun Yat-Sen University	331
Sichuan University	336
Xiamen University	362
Nankai University	377
South China University of Technology	385
Southeast University	428
University of Science and Technology Beijing	430
Central South University	431
Dalian University of Technology	448
Hunan University	448
University of Electronic Science and Technology of China	451
Beihang University	452
China Agricultural University	484
Chongqing University	489
Shanghai University	489
Jilin University	497
East China Normal University	501
Shenzhen University	508
Zhengzhou University	511
Northwestern Polytechnical University	547
Nanjing University of Science and Technology	565
Jinan University - Guangdong	580
Renmin University of China	621-630
China University of Petroleum (Beijing)	631-640
East China University of Science and Technology	641-650
Soochow University	641-650
China University of Mining Technology	681-690
Beijing University of Chemical Technology	701-710
Nanjing Agricultural University	711-720
Lanzhou University	721-730
Nanjing University of Aeronautics and Astronautics	761-770
China University of Geosciences Wuhan	771-780
Beijing University of Technology	801-850
Huazhong Agricultural University	801-850
Ocean University of China	801-850
Wuhan University of Technology	801-850
Donghua University - Shanghai	851-900
Northwest Agriculture and Forestry University	851-900
Beijing University of Posts and Telecommunications	901-950
Beijing Jiaotong University	901-950
Harbin Engineering University	1001-1200
Hohai University Changzhou	1001-1200
Nanjing Normal University	1001-1200
Northwest University	1001-1200
Southwest University	1001-1200
Jiangnan University	1001-1200
Xi'an Jiaotong Liverpool University	1001-1200
Beijing Foreign Studies University	1201-1400
Beijing University of Chinese Medicine and Pharmacology	1201-1400
China University of Political Science and Law	1201-1400
Shanghai International Studies University	1201-1400
Shanghai University of Finance and Economics	1201-1400
University of International Business and Economics	1201-1400
Shanghai Normal University	1401-1500

==== Times Higher Education World University Rankings ====
Institution	2026 World Rankings
Tsinghua University	12
Peking University	13
Fudan University	36
Zhejiang University	39
Shanghai Jiao Tong University	40
University of Science and Technology of China	51
Nanjing University	62
Wuhan University	122
Harbin Institute of Technology	131
Beijing Normal University	134
Tongji University	141
Southern University of Science and Technology	160
Huazhong University of Science and Technology	176
Sun Yat-Sen University	201-250
Xi'an Jiaotong University	201-250
Beijing Institute of Technology	201-250
Sichuan University	201-250
Tianjin University	201-250
Hunan University	251-300
Beihang University	251-300
Central South University	251-300
East China Normal University	251-300
Nankai University	251-300
Shandong University	251-300
South China University of Technology	251-300
Southeast University	251-300
Xiamen University	251-300
Northwestern Polytechnical University	251-300
Southern Medical University	251-300
University of Electronic Science and Technology of China	301-350
Chongqing University	351-400
Shenzhen University	351-400
Beijing University of Chemical Technology	401-500
Dalian University of Technology	401-500
Donghua University - Shanghai	401-500
Jiangsu University	501-600
Jinan University - Guangdong	501-600
Northeastern University in China	501-600
Shanghai University	501-600
University of International Business and Economics	501-600
Yangzhou University	501-600
Zhejiang University of Technology	501-600
China University of Petroleum (Beijing)	501-600
Soochow University	501-600
Capital University of Medical Sciences	601-800
East China University of Science and Technology	601-800
Guangdong University of Technology	601-800
Harbin Engineering University	601-800
Nanjing Forestry University	601-800
Nanjing University of Aeronautics and Astronautics	601-800
Nanjing University of Technology	601-800
Nanjing University of Science and Technology	601-800
Ocean University of China	601-800
Qingdao University	601-800
South China Normal University	601-800
Zhejiang Normal University	601-800
Xidian University	601-800
Jiangnan University	601-800
Xi'an Jiaotong Liverpool University	601-800
Chengdu University of Technology	801-1000
Fuzhou University	801-1000
Nanjing Medical University	801-1000
Nanjing Normal University	801-1000
Northeast Agricultural University	801-1000
Northeast Normal University	801-1000
Southwest Jiaotong University	801-1000
Zhejiang Gongshang University	801-1000
Nanjing University of Information Science and Technology	801-1000
Guangzhou Medical University	801-1000
Wenzhou University	801-1000

==== Times Higher Education Most International Universities Ranking ====
World Ranking
Institution	2022
Peking University	123
Zhejiang University	133
Tongji University	138
East China Normal University	140
Nanjing University	150
Tsinghua University	152
Fudan University	159
Shanghai Jiao Tong University	161
Beijing Normal University	168
Xi’an Jiaotong University	181
Wuhan University	182
Tianjin University	184
Sichuan University	187
Harbin Institute of Technology	188
Sun Yat-sen University	189
University of Science and Technology of China	190
Huazhong University of Science and Technology	191
Central South University	193

==== US News Best Global Universities Ranking ====
World Ranking
Institution	2025-2026
Tsinghua University	11
Peking University	25
Zhejiang University	45
Shanghai Jiao Tong University	46
University of Chinese Academy of Sciences	54
Fudan University	70
University of Science and Technology of China	71
Sun Yat Sen University	85
Nanjing University	86
Wuhan University	90
Huazhong University of Science and Technology	91
Hunan University	109
Southern University of Science and Technology	123
Tongji University	124
Harbin Institute of Technology	128
University of Electronic Science and Technology of China	137
Xi'an Jiaotong University	141
Central South University	146
Southeast University	155
Beijing Institute of Technology	=156
Shenzhen University	=156
Nankai University	=166
South China University of Technology	=166
Beijing Normal University	173
Sichuan University	=182
Tianjin University	=182
Xiamen University	189
China Agricultural University	202
Zhengzhou University	203
Beihang University	=207
Northwestern Polytechnical University	=207
China University of Geosciences (Wuhan)	211
Chongqing University	212
East China Normal University	230
Shandong University	238
Wuhan University of Technology	260
Dalian University of Technology	261
Jiangsu University	271
Northwest A&F University	288
Soochow University	292
Jilin University	=296
Shanghai University	=296
Nanjing Agricultural University	302
Westlake University	308
Beijing University of Chemical Technology	319
ShanghaiTech University	330
Huazhong Agricultural University	340
Jinan University	345
University of Science and Technology Beijing	357
Zhejiang Normal University	360
Qingdao University	361
Nanjing Forestry University	374
Jiangnan University	376
Fuzhou University	383
Renmin University of China	=394
Central China Normal University	=394
Nanjing University of Information Science and Technology	409
Northeastern University-China	=445
Xidian University	=445
Nanjing University of Science and Technology	451
Guangzhou University	454
Lanzhou University	460
Donghua University	=464
Ocean University of China	=464
Peking Union Medical College	=468
Southwestern University of Finance and Economics	=468
Guangdong University of Technology	=473
Southwest University	=473
Hohai University	483
Nanjing Normal University	492
Anhui University of Finance and Economics	=500
China University of Petroleum	=500

=== Other Global Rankings ===
Other international rankings:

- CWTS Leiden Ranking by CWTS Leiden Ranking
- Nature Index by Nature Research
- UTN Rankings by Performance Ranking of Scientific Papers for World Universities
- SCImago Institutions Rankings by SCImago Institutions Rankings
- The Center for World University Rankings by the Center for World University Rankings (CWUR)
- Webometrics Ranking ranks more than 2500 universities in China by the Webometrics Ranking of World Universities
