= CUAA Chinese university ranking =

Chinese domestic university rankings

Universities Ranking of China released by CUAA (Chinese Universities Alumni Association, Chinese: 中国校友会网; CUAA.net) is a domestic university rankings in China. This ranking is operated by a commercial company instead of a registered organization, and is not recognized by the Chinese government or any higher education institution in China.

The initiation of the CUAA-Team of China University Evaluation can be traced back to the Research Group of Comparative Studies of Universities in Chinese Academy of Management Science founded in 1989. The Team has the longest history of consistent evaluation and study of Chinese universities with over 30 years. The alumni-related data considers notable politicians, academics at home and abroad, distinguished scholars in humanities and social sciences, and billionaires who graduated from Chinese higher education institutions after the 1952 reorganisation of the sector.

== General Ranking ==
Name	2016	2015	2014	2013	2012	2011	2010	2009	2008	2007
Peking University	1	1	1	1	1	1	1	1	1	1
Tsinghua University	2	2	2	2	2	2	2	2	2	2
Fudan University	3	3	4	4	4	4	4	4	4	4
Wuhan University	4	4	5	6	6	6	5	5	5	5
Renmin University of China	6	5	7	8	9	10	7	8	7	7
Zhejiang University	5	6	6	5	5	5	6	6	6	6
Shanghai Jiaotong University	7	7	3	5	5	5	5	3	3	3
Nanjing University	8	8	8	12	12	8	9	7	8	8
University of Science and Technology of China	12	9	14	10	9	18	17	16	15	17
National University of Defense Technology	9	10	N/A	N/A	N/A	N/A	N/A	N/A	N/A	N/A

== Billionaire Ranking ==
In first decade of the 21st century, many Chinese media have been very active in making ranking lists for Chinese colleges and universities according to the number of billionaires they have produced.

These ranking lists are often seen in Chinese TV, newspapers, books, and even academic studies and publications. Such rankings are normally made annually. Most of these rankings are based on the billionaire rankings made by Forbes (American business magazine) and Hurun Report (a business ranking specialized company based in mainland China).

Citation based on:

- Forbes: The World's Billionaires
- Huren Report: Huren Top 100 Billionaires (胡润百富)(in Chinese)

=== Methodology ===
The methodology for these rankings is rather simple: the amount of billionaires a university or college have, including its alumni and faculty.

=== Notable ranking source ===
There are several notable ranking entities, and most of them are also Internet-based and have their own homepages.

- 2010: Chinese university billionaire investigation, from the Chinese University Alumni Association (CUAA, Chinese: 中国大学校友会).
- 2009 Chinese University Business-making Ranking, from People.com.cn (one of the largest and most popular Chinese websites).
- 2009 List of billionaire alumni of Chinese universities, full list from Tencent QQ News.

=== Ranking ===
The most recent ranking is: (only top 10 are listed out as below) measured in billion Chinese Yuan.

Ranking	University/College	Location	No. of billionaires	Wealth	Majors
1	Peking University	Beijing	63	139	MBA, management, law, bioengineering, physics, chemistry, mathematics, Chinese language
2	Tsinghua University	Beijing	54	91.1	MBA, mechanical engineering, civil engineering & architecture, physics, electronic engineering
3	Zhejiang University	Hangzhou, Zhejiang Province	53	149.9	MBA, management, law, computer science, history, civil engineering & architecture
4	Fudan University	Shanghai	38	135.4	MBA, management, medicine & pharmacy, photonics, journalism, philosophy
5	Renmin University	Beijing	26	89.4	MBA, management, law
6	Shanghai Jiao Tong University	Shanghai	19	27.9	MBA, management, electronic engineering, mechanical engineering, computer science
7	Sun Yat-sen University	Guangzhou, Guangdong Province	18	40.4	MBA, management, philosophy, Chinese language
8	Nanjing University	Nanjing, Jiangsu Province	16	27.2	MBA, management, history, electronic engineering, civil engineering & architecture
9	South China University of Technology	Guangzhou, Guangdong Province	15	35.3	telecommunication, mechanical engineering, electronic engineering, chemical engineering
10	Zhejiang University of Technology	Hangzhou, Zhejiang Province	12	30.7	MBA, management, chemical engineering, automation
10	Huazhong University of Science and Technology	Wuhan, Hubei Province	12	16.4	MBA, management, electric engineering, mechanical engineering, computer
10	Wuhan University	Wuhan, Hubei Province	12	34.2	MBA, management, physics, bioengineering, statics
10	Harbin Institute of Technology	Harbin, Heilongjiang Province	12	32.5	MBA, electric engineering, mechanical engineering, chemical engineering, automation

== See also ==
- Rankings of universities in China
- University rankings in China
- Billionaire
- List of people by net worth of the People's Republic of China
- List of Hong Kong people by net worth
- List of countries by the number of US dollar billionaires
- List of universities in China
- Project 211
- Project 985
- 863 Program
