= Mao Yisheng =

Chinese structural engineer and social activist

- 茅以升
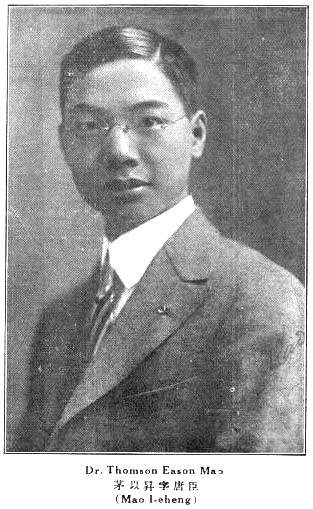

Vice Chairperson of the Chinese People's Political Consultative Conference
- In office 26 May 1984 – 10 April 1988
- Chairwoman: Deng Yingchao

President of Northern Jiaotong University
- In office July 1949 – August 1951
- Preceded by: Xu Peikun
- Succeeded by: Wang Xiaoci

President of Peiyang University
- In office May 1946 – August 1948
- Preceded by: Shu-tien Li
- Succeeded by: Zhang Hanying

President of National Peiyang Technical Institute
- In office July 1928 – June 1930
- Preceded by: Liu Xianzhou
- Succeeded by: Cai Yuanze (蔡远泽)

President of Hehai Institute of Engineering
- In office July 1924 – August 1925
- Preceded by: Shen Zuwei (沈祖伟)
- Succeeded by: Yang Xiaoshu (杨孝述)

Personal details
- Born: Mao Yisheng (茅以昇); January 9, 1896 Zhenjiang, Jiangsu, Qing Empire
- Died: November 12, 1989 (aged 93) Beijing, China
- Spouse: Dai Chuanhui
- Relations: Mao Yushi (nephew)
- Children: 4
- Education: Southwest Jiaotong University; Cornell University; Carnegie Mellon University

Dr. Mao Yisheng a.k.a. Thomson Eason Mao (Chinese: 茅以升; pinyin: Máo Yǐshēng; Wade–Giles: Mao^{2} I^{3}-sheng^{1}; January 9, 1896 – November 12, 1989) was a Chinese structural engineer and social activist. He was one of the most famous Chinese structural engineers, a pioneer in bridge construction, and a social activist.

== Early life ==
Mao was born in Zhenjiang, Jiangsu province. He entered Jiaotong University's Tangshan Engineering College (now Southwest Jiaotong University) and earned his bachelor's degree in civil engineering in 1916. He earned his master's degree from Cornell University and earned the first Ph.D. ever granted by the Carnegie Institute of Technology (now Carnegie Mellon University) in 1919. His doctoral treatise entitled Secondary Stress on Frame Construction is treasured at the Hunt Library of Carnegie Mellon University and the university constructed a statue of him on campus in his honor.

== Career ==
=== Engineer ===
Mao was regarded as the founder of modern bridge engineering in China. With regard to traditional Chinese bridges, he once said "the most ancient bridge in China is the Zhaozhou Bridge, the most splendid the Lugou Bridge, and the most elegant and artistic the Five-Pavilion Bridge."

Mao's long and productive career included designing two of the most famous modern bridges in China, the Qiantang River Bridge near Hangzhou, and the Wuhan Yangtze River Bridge in Wuhan. The Qiantang River Bridge is the first dual-purpose road-and-railway bridge designed and built by a Chinese. He also participated in the construction of China's first modern bridge – Wuhan Yangtze River Bridge. During the construction of Wuhan Yangtze River Bridge, Mao Yisheng served as chairman of the Technical Advisory Committee composed of more than 20 foreign and Chinese bridge experts, and solved 14 difficult problems relating to bridge construction.

He also led the structural design of the Great Hall of the People in Beijing.

=== Educator ===
Returning to China, Mao was on the faculty of five major universities and served as president of four, such as the professor and President of Tangshan Engineering College of the National Chiao Tung University (now Southwest Jiaotong University), Dean of Engineering College of National Southeastern University (later renamed National Central University and then Nanjing University, the engineering school of which later became Nanjing Institute of Technology and then Southeast University), President of Hohai Technology University (now Southeast University and Hohai University), President of Peiyang University (now Tianjin University), President of China Chiao Tung University (later renamed Northern Chiao Tung University, with campus in Tangshan and Beijing, later Southwest Jiaotong University and Beijing Jiaotong University), President of Director of Project Office of Hangzhou Qiantang River Bridge, and Director of Bridge Planning Project Office of Transportation Ministry of Kuomintang Administration.

He significantly influenced Chinese engineering education by introducing new subject matter and innovative pedagogical approaches. In addition to his engineering expertise, he was a distinguished scholar of the History of science in China.

He advocated popular science education, and wrote "On Bridge", "China's Arch Bridges" and many other popular science articles.

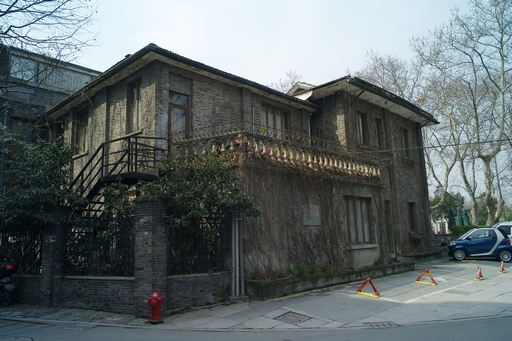
The former Residence of Mao Yisheng, a historic house in Hangzhou

=== Leadership ===
Mao served as a leader of the China Engineers Association, the Chinese Civil Engineering Society and the China Association of Science and Technology. He has also served as president of Southwest Jiaotong University (from Tangshan Engineering College to Northern Jiaotong University to Southwest Jiaotong University), director of Railway Institute under the Ministry of Railway, president of Railway Scientific Research Center, chairman of Beijing Science Association, honorary president and vice-president of the China Association for Science and Technology, vice-chairman of Jiu San Society, vice-chairman of the Chinese People's Political Consultative Conference (CPPCC), member of CPPCC, and the standing committee member of National People's Congress.

Mao was elected as a member of Chinese Academy of Sciences in 1955, foreign associate of the United States National Academy of Engineering in 1982. He was a senior member of International Association for Bridge and Structural Engineering, honorary member of the Canadian Society of Civil Engineers, and outstanding alumnus from Cornell University and Carnegie Mellon University.

On April 18, 2006, Carnegie Mellon University set up a statue honoring its first doctoral graduate. The sculpture includes an inscription from China's Premier Wen Jiabao.

On March 27, 2014, an eponymous play debuted at Beijing Jiaotong. Deans from the sister Jiaotong universities attended the premiere.

== Family ==
Mao Yisheng's nephew Mao Yushi is an economist.

Educational offices
| Previous: Shen Zuwei (沈祖伟) | President of Hehai Institute of Engineering; 1924-1925 | Next: Yang Xiaoshu (杨孝述) |
| Previous: Liu Xianzhou | President of National Peiyang Technical Institute; 1928-1930 | Next: Cai Yuanze (蔡远泽) |
| Previous: Shu-tien Li | President of Peiyang University; 1946-1948 | Next: Zhang Hanying |
| Previous: Xu Peikun | President of Northern Jiaotong University; 1949-1951 | Next: Wang Xiaoci |
