= President of Tianjin University =

The office of the President of Tianjin University, currently held by Jin Donghan (simplified Chinese: 金东寒; traditional Chinese: 金東寒), was created with the founding of Tientsin University in 1895 as the governor officer of the school.

After the founding of the People's Republic of China, each president is appointed by and is responsible to the Central Committee of the Chinese Communist Party and the State Council, who is delegated the day-to-day running of the university. In reality, the university President reports to the Party Secretary in the university's Communist Party committee.

== Presidents of Tianjin University ==
Period	Year	President (English name)	President (Chinese name)	Alma mater	Position
Tientsin University/Imperial Tientsin University	October 1895-October 1896	Sheng Xuanhuai	盛宣怀		Governor
Tientsin University/Imperial Tientsin University	October 1895-October 1896	Charles Daniel Tenney	丁家立	Dartmouth College	Chief teacher
Peiyang University/Imperial Peiyang University	October 1896 – 1906	Charles Daniel Tenney	丁家立	Dartmouth College	Chief teacher
Peiyang University/Imperial Peiyang University	1902-1903	Tang Zhaoyi	唐绍仪		Governor
Peiyang University/Imperial Peiyang University	1906-1907	Liang Dunyan	梁敦彦		Governor
Peiyang University/Imperial Peiyang University	1907-1908	Liang Ruhao	梁如浩		Governor
Peiyang University/Imperial Peiyang University	1908-1910	Cai Shaoji	蔡绍基		Governor
Peiyang University/Imperial Peiyang University	1909-December 1911	Cai Rukai	蔡儒楷		Supervisor
Peiyang University/Imperial Peiyang University	December 1911-January 1912	Xu Deyuan	徐德源		Supervisor
Peiyang University	January 1912-February 1913	Xu Deyuan	徐德源		President
National Peiyang University	February 1913-March 1914	Cai Rukai	蔡儒楷		President
National Peiyang University	March 1914-January 1920	Zhao Tianlin	赵天麟	Peiyang University Harvard University	President
National Peiyang University	January 1920-August 1924	Feng Xiyun	冯熙运	Peiyang University Harvard University; University of Chicago	President
National Peiyang University	September 1924-July 1928	Liu Xianzhou	刘仙洲	the University of Hong Kong	President
National Peiyang College of Engineering	December 1928-July 1930	Mao Yisheng	茅以升	Tangshan Industrial College; Cornell University; Carnegie Mellon University	President
National Peiyang College of Engineering	July 1930 – 1932	Cai Yuanze	蔡远泽	Nanyang Public School; Peiyang University; Massachusetts Institute of Technology; Columbia University	President
National Peiyang College of Engineering	1932-July 1938	Li Shutian	李书田	Peiyang University; Cornell University	President
National Northwest Institute of Technology	July 1938-February 1939	Li Shutian	李书田	Peiyang University; Cornell University	Director of the Preparatory Committee
National Northwest Institute of Technology	February 1939-October 1943	Lai Lian	赖琏	University of Illinois; Cornell University	President
National Northwest Institute of Technology	October 1943-May 1946	Pan Chengxiao	潘承孝	University of Wisconsin	President
National Peiyang College of Engineering	1943-1946	Chen Jinmin	陈荩民	Institut Franco-Chinois de Lyon	President
National Peiyang University	May 1946-August 1948	Mao Yisheng	茅以升	Tangshan Industrial College; Cornell University; Carnegie Mellon University	President
National Peiyang University	1946-1947	Jin Wenzhu	金问洙	Peiyang University	Acting president
National Peiyang University	1947-1948	Zhong Shiming	钟世铭	Peiyang University; Harvard University	Acting president
National Peiyang University	August 1948-April 1949	Zhang Hanying	张含英	Peiyang University; Cornell University	President
National Peiyang University	April 1949-September 1951	Liu Xiying	刘锡瑛	Peiyang University; Harvard University	President
Tianjin University	September 1951 – 1952	Liu Xiying	刘锡瑛	Peiyang University; Harvard University	President
Tianjin University	1952-1957	Wu De	吴德		President
Tianjin University	1957-1966	Zhang Guofan	张国藩	University of Shanghai; Cornell University; The University of Iowa	President
Tianjin University	1977–1978	Zang Boping	臧伯平		President
Tianjin University	1978–1982	Li Shusen	李曙森	Beijing Normal University	President
Tianjin University	1982–1986	Shi Zhaoxi	史绍熙	Peiyang University; The University of Manchester	President
Tianjin University	1986–1993	Wu Yongshi	吴咏诗	Nankai University	President
Tianjin University	1993–1997	Li Guangquan	李光泉	Tianjin University	President
Tianjin University	1997–2006	Shan Ping	单平	Tianjin University	President
Tianjin University	2006–2011	Gong Ke	龚克	Beijing Institute of Technology	President
Tianjin University	2011–September 2016	Li Jiajun	李家俊	Tianjin University; University of Wales	President
Tianjin University	September 2016–February 2019	Zhong Denghua	钟登华; 鍾登華	Nanchang University; Tianjin University	President
Tianjin University	May 2019–	Jin Donghan	金东寒; 金東寒	Wuhan University of Technology; China Ship Research and Development Academy	President

== Communist Party Committee Secretaries of Tianjin University ==
Period	Year	Communist Party Secretary (English name)	Communist Party Secretary (Chinese name)	Alma mater
Tianjin University	1956-1957	Li Shusen	李曙森	Beijing Normal University
Tianjin University	1957-1963	Jia Zhen	贾震	
Tianjin University	1963-1965	Li Shusen	李曙森	Beijing Normal University
Tianjin University	1966; 1973-1977	Su Zhaung	苏庄	Beijing Normal University
Tianjin University	1977–1978	Zang Boping	臧伯平	
Tianjin University	1979-1981	Lu Da	路达	
Tianjin University	1981-1983	Hu Pansheng	胡泮生	
Tianjin University	1983-1984	Li Rei	李瑞	
Tianjin University	1984-1991	Yang Hui	杨辉	
Tianjin University	1991-2002	Yang Yuqin	杨渝钦	Tianjin University
Tianjin University	April 2002-September 2016	Liu Jianping	刘建平	University of Science and Technology Beijing
Tianjin University	September 2016–August 2021	Li Jiajun	李家俊	Tianjin University; University of Wales
Tianjin University	August 2021–present	Yang Xianjin	杨贤金; 楊賢金	Tianjin University
