= Charles Tenney =

Charles Tenney may refer to:

- Charles H. Tenney (1842–1919), one of the "Methuen city fathers" who grew rich in Methuen, Massachusetts, during the industrial boom of the late 19th century
- Charles Henry Tenney (1911–1994), United States federal judge
- Charles Daniel Tenney (1857–1930), American educator and diplomat to China
