= Zhao Xiao =

Chinese economist

- 赵晓
- Born: March 1967 (age 59); Beijing, China
- Education: Shandong University; Nankai University; Beijing University
- Occupations: Economist, professor
- Known for: Promoting Christianity

Zhao Xiao (Chinese: 赵晓; pinyin: Zhào Xiǎo; born March 1967) is a Chinese economist who has gained attention for arguing that China’s economy would benefit from the spread of Christianity.

In 2002 he published a paper entitled "Market Economies With Churches and Market Economies Without Churches", which argued that the key to America's commercial success was its churches.

Zhao began to study the Bible with the intent of proving there was no truth in it, but after three months, he “admitted defeat” and converted to Christianity.

== Career ==
=== Education ===
- 1989 BSc Economics Shandong University
- 1995 Institute of Economics of Nankai University, master's degree in economics
- 1999 Guanghua Management Institute of Beijing University, doctorate in economics

=== Current positions ===
Zhao Xiao is a professor at the Department of International Business and Economics at the School of Economics and Management at the University of Science and Technology Beijing.

He was formerly the Head of the Economic Research Center, Macro Strategy Department of State-owned Assets Supervision and Administration Commission of the China State Council (SASAC). In addition, he teaches at the Management School of the University of Science and Technology, Beijing.

He was a Guest Researcher for the World Bank China Center for Economic Research at Beijing University; a Special Researcher at China Society and Economic Reform; a Special Researcher, Unirule Institute of Economics; Observer for China Central Television's "Financial and Economic Report"; and was nominated for the China Young Scholar of Economics Award.

His principal fields of research are: macro economy and policy analysis, state-owned enterprise reform, and market analysis and forecast.

He has over 200 research publications in major economic journals in China, on topics such as: policy analysis on financial crisis, petroleum impact on Chinese economy, and employment and enterprise development.

He is currently Director of the Cypress Leadership Institute in Beijing.

Zhao has pioneered the studies of market economy and ethics in China, and his "The real story behind Chinese economic growth" was approved as required reading for State Council economist conference by former Premier Zhu Rongji.
