= Sheng Xuanhuai =

Chinese businessman, politician, and educator (1844–1916)

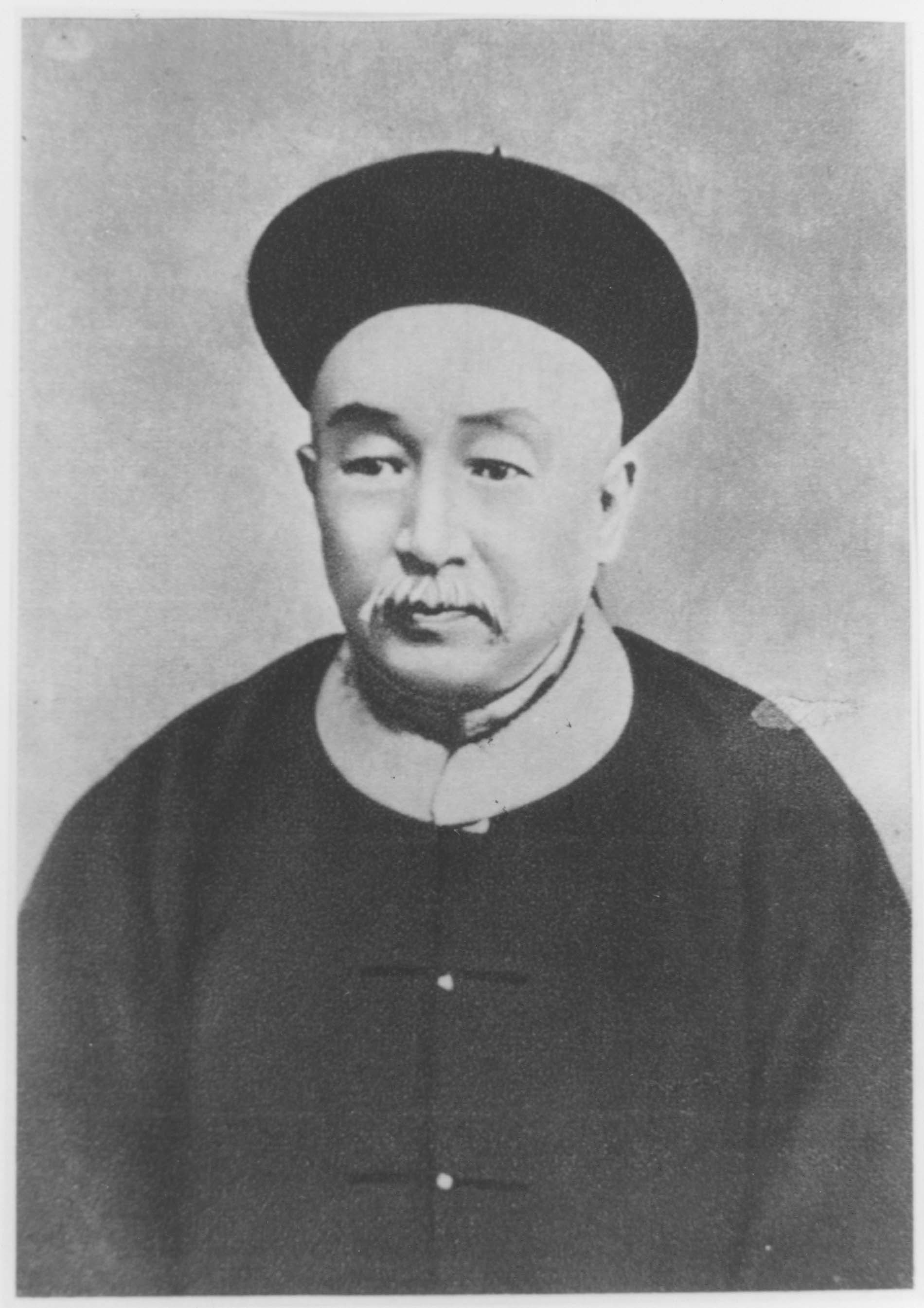

1st Minister of Mail and Communications of the Imperial Cabinet
- In office 8 May 1911 – 26 October 1911
- Monarch: Xuantong Emperor
- Prime Minister: Yikuang, Prince Qing
- Preceded by: Position established
- Succeeded by: Tang Shaoyi

1st President of the Imperial Tientsin University
- In office October 1895 – October 1896 Serving with Charles Daniel Tenney
- Succeeded by: Tang Shaoyi (as Governor)

President of Nanyang Public School
- In office 1896-1905
- Succeeded by: He Zhi

Personal details
- Born: 4 November 1844
- Died: 27 April 1916 (aged 71)

Chinese name
- Traditional Chinese: 盛宣懷
- Simplified Chinese: 盛宣怀
Transcriptions
Standard Mandarin
- Hanyu Pinyin: Shèng Xuānhuái
- Wade–Giles: Sheng Hsüan-huai

Sheng Gongbao
- Traditional Chinese: 盛宮保
- Simplified Chinese: 盛宫保
Transcriptions
Standard Mandarin
- Hanyu Pinyin: Shèng Gōngbǎo
- Wade–Giles: Sheng Kung-pao

Sheng Xuanhuai (Chinese: 盛宣懷; 4 November 1844 – 27 April 1916) was a Qing dynasty Chinese tycoon, politician, and educator. He founded several major banks and universities and served as Minister of Transportation of the Qing Empire. He was also known as Sheng Gongbao (盛宮保; Shèng Gōngbǎo).

== Biography ==
Sheng was born into a family of officials, and was the eldest of six children. Sheng's father was also a close friend of General Li Hongzhang. In 1870, Li appreciated Sheng's talent, employed him as his aide and soon became his chief economic deputy. Sheng recommended that Li build more merchant ships in order to fund the military ships that the Qing government needed. Sheng's suggestion was accepted and from then on Sheng became well known for his career in ship building.

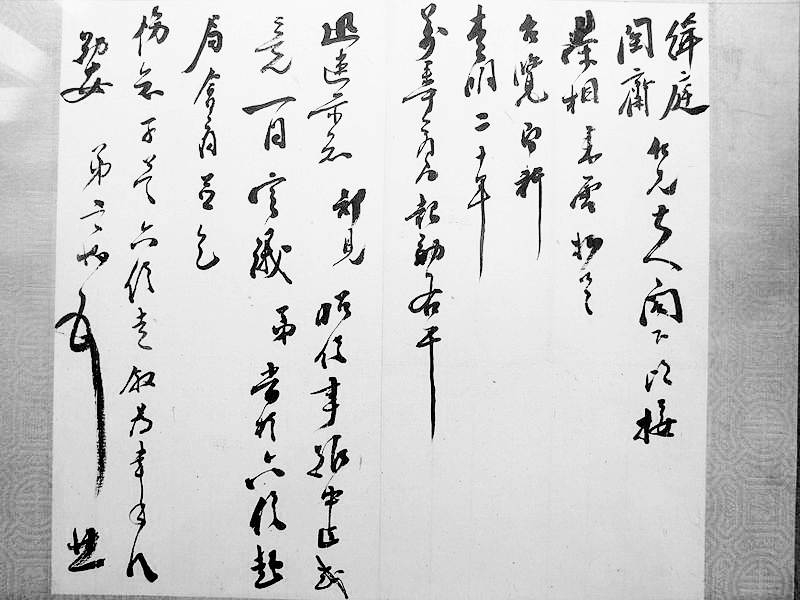
Sheng Xuanhuai's calligraphy

Taking active part in the Self-Strengthening Movement, He actively advocated using Western technology in saving the country from destitution. His influence was mainly felt in the southern part of China, specifically in Shanghai. By 1893, Sheng controlled China Merchants' Steam Navigation Company, established the Imperial Telegraphy Administration and created first successful cotton mill in China. In 1896, he took over the Hanyang ironworks and related mines, along with control of the newly created imperial railway administration.

In 1895, he founded Beiyang University, the first institution of modern higher education in China. In 1896, he also founded the forerunner of Jiaotong University, which was later divided into Shanghai Jiaotong University and Xi'an Jiaotong University. He also created eleven "first", including the first modern bank, first telegraphy company, the first iron and steel joint enterprise....

In 1897, official Sheng founded the Imperial Bank of China, the first Chinese owned commercial bank modeled on the Western banking system. The bank was headquartered in Shanghai and had the authority to issue notes from the Qing government.

Sheng Xuanhuai was a founder and the first president of the Red Cross Society of China, and is widely considered one of the key officials behind the then fledgling movement alongside Shen Dunhe.

After the Boxer Uprising, in 1900 when Eight Nation Alliance entered Peking, Sheng and Ronglu initiated the Mutual Protection of Southeast China, resisting Empress Dowager Cixi's Imperial Decree of declaration of war against foreign powers. Li Hongzhang, Yuan Shikai and other viceroys openly rejected Dowager's call for staging military actions against the foreign powers.

In 1902, Sheng and British diplomat James Mackay negotiated and signed the Sino-British "Mackay Treaty," which anticipated the abolition of extraterritoriality in China.

In 1911, Sheng was appointed head of the Board of Posts and Communications, a high rank in the Imperial cabinet during the Qing dynasty, until the dynasty fell in 1911. Sheng died at the age of 72 in Shanghai.

== Residences ==
Sheng's private residence in Beijing while he was serving as the postal minister, has since been turned into a hotel for the public. In Shanghai, Sheng lived a mansion constructed in 1900 at No. 1517 Huaihai Zhong Lu. Tongmenghui revolutionaries Xia Chao and Gu Naibin planned to burn down the building in 1911. The manor currently houses the Japanese Consulate.

== See also ==
- Sheng Aiyi

== Bibliography ==
- Feuerwerker, Albert. China's Early Industrialization; Sheng Hsuan-huai (1844-1916) and Mandarin Enterprise. Cambridge, MA: Harvard University Press, 1958.
- Shêng, Hu; Danian, Liu (1983). The 1911 Revolution: A Retrospective After 70 Years. New World Press.
