= Wu Zhongru =

Chinese engineer (1939–2023)

- 吴中如
- Born: 9 September 1939; Yixing County, Jiangsu, China
- Died: 5 February 2023 (aged 83); China
- Education: Hohai University
- Scientific career
- Fields: Hydraulic structure
- Workplaces: Hohai University

Chinese name
- Simplified Chinese: 吴中如
- Traditional Chinese: 吳中如
Transcriptions
Standard Mandarin
- Hanyu Pinyin: Wú Zhōngrú

Wu Zhongru (Chinese: 吴中如; 9 September 1939 – 5 February 2023) was a Chinese engineer specializing in hydraulic structure, and an academician of the Chinese Academy of Engineering.

Wu was a member of the 10th National Committee of the Chinese People's Political Consultative Conference.

== Biography ==
Wu was born in Yixing County (now Yixing), Jiangsu, on 9 September 1939, while his ancestral home is in Shaoxing, Zhejiang. He attended Yixing Heqiao High School (宜兴市和桥高级中学).

After graduating from East China Water Conservancy Institute (now Hohai University) in 1963, he worked at the Hydrology Institute of Water Resources (水利水电科学研究院水文所), and then successively worked at North Henan Test Station (豫北试验站), Tieshanhe Reservoir (铁山河水库), Xinxiang Prefectural Electricity Bureau (新乡地区电业局), and Xuzhou Power Plant Project Construction Headquarters (徐州电厂工程建设指挥部). He joined the faculty of Hohai University in January 1979. He joined the Chinese Communist Party (CCP) in July 1986.

Wu died on 5 February 2023, at the age of 83.

== Honours and awards ==
- 1990 State Science and Technology Progress Award (Third Class) for the research and application of mathematical model for deformation observation of concrete dam
- 1995 State Science and Technology Progress Award (Second Class) for the high dam safety monitoring technology and feedback
- 1997 Member of the Chinese Academy of Engineering (CAE)
- 2004 State Science and Technology Progress Award (Second Class) for the theory and method of dam and dam foundation safety monitoring and its application
- 2007 State Science and Technology Progress Award (Second Class) for the study on monitoring and health diagnosis of hidden danger of major hydraulic concrete structures
