= Zhao Guofan =

Chinese civil structural engineer

- 赵国藩
- Born: 29 December 1924; Fenyang County, Shanxi, China
- Died: 1 February 2017 (aged 92); Dalian, Liaoning, China
- Education: Chiao Tung University; East China People's Revolutionary University
- Scientific career
- Fields: Civil structure
- Workplaces: Dalian University of Technology
- Academic advisors: Xu Zhilun

Chinese name
- Simplified Chinese: 赵国藩
- Traditional Chinese: 趙國藩
Transcriptions
Standard Mandarin
- Hanyu Pinyin: Zhào Guófān
- Wade–Giles: Chao4 Kuo2-fan1

Zhao Guofan (29 December 1924 – 1 February 2017) was a Chinese civil structural engineer. He was an academician of the Chinese Academy of Engineering.

== Biography ==
Zhao was born in Fengyang County, Shanxi, on 29 December 1924. He had two younger brothers. By age 13, the Second Sino-Japanese War broke out, his father was conscripted into military service. Zhao and her mother fled to different cities to take refuge. Finally, they settled in the suburb of Xi'an, Shaanxi. In 1945, he was admitted to Chiao Tung University, where he majored in the Department of Civil Engineering. After graduation, he entered the East China People's Revolutionary University (华东人民革命大学).

After graduating in 1949, he was recruited by the Qiqihar Railway Bureau and soon after moved to the Department of Water Conservancy, Lanzhou University. He was appointed assistant of Dalian University of Technology, in August 1950, becoming professor in 1954. During the Korean War, he was an engineer in the 810 National Defense Construction Committee. He joined the Jiusan Society in 1956. He was a visiting scholar at North Carolina State University from March 1981 to September 1981.

He died of illness in Dalian, Liaoning, on 1 February 2017, aged 92.

== Works ==
- 高等钢筋混凝土结构学 [Advanced Reinforced Concrete Structure] (in Chinese). Beijing: China Machine Press. 2012. ISBN 9787111168478.
- 赵国藩院士学术论文选 [Selected Academic Papers of Academician Zhao Guofan] (in Chinese). Dalian, Liaoning: Dalian University of Technology Press. 2010. ISBN 9787561177907.
- 钢纤维混凝土结构 [Steel Fiber Reinforced Concrete Structure] (in Chinese). Beijing: China Architecture & Building Press. 1999. ISBN 9787112039807.
- 结构可靠度理论 [Structural Reliability Theory] (in Chinese). Beijing: China Architecture & Building Press. 2000. ISBN 9787112045648.
- Zhao Guofan; Cao Juyi; Zhang Kuanquan (2011). 工程结构可靠度 [Structural Reliability] (in Chinese). Beijing: Science Press. ISBN 9787030318640.

== Honours and awards ==
- 1997 Member of the Chinese Academy of Engineering (CAE)
- 1998 State Science and Technology Progress Award (Third Class)
