= Zheng Shouren =

Chinese engineer (1940–2020)

- 郑守仁
- Born: January 30, 1940; Yingshang County, Anhui, China
- Died: July 24, 2020 (aged 80); Wuhan, Hubei, China
- Education: Hohai University
- Scientific career
- Fields: Hydraulic and Hydro-Power Engineering
- Workplaces: Yangtze River Water Conservancy Commission

Chinese name
- Traditional Chinese: 鄭守仁
- Simplified Chinese: 郑守仁
Transcriptions
Standard Mandarin
- Hanyu Pinyin: Zhèng Shǒurén

Zheng Shouren (Chinese: 郑守仁; pinyin: Zhèng Shǒurén; January 30, 1940 – July 24, 2020) was a Chinese engineer and chief designer of the Three Gorges Dam. He had been engaged in the planning and design of the Yangtze River Basin and major water conservancy projects for a long time and had published more than 60 papers and 4 books.

== Biography ==
Zheng was born in Yingshang County, Anhui, on January 30, 1940. After graduating from East China University of Water Resources (now Hohai University) in September 1963, he was assigned to the Yangtze River Basin Planning Office, where he was promoted to deputy chief engineer in 1991 and to chief engineer in 1994. He was chief designer of the Three Gorges Dam. He died of illness in Wuhan, Hubei, on July 24, 2020.

== Contributions ==
He successively participated in the designs of Lushui Hydropower Project of Hubei, Wujiangdu Hydropower Project of Guizhou and Yangtze River Gezhouba Hydropower project, and took responsibilities for diversion design of the Wujiangdu as well as river closure design and cofferdam design of the Gezhouba Dam. He also joined and took charge of the designs of Qingjiang Geheyan Hydropower Project and Three Gorges Dam.

== Works ==
- Zheng Shouren; Zhong Zhiyu; Zou Qiang; Ding Yi; Yang Lin; Luo Xue (2020). Flood Resources Utilization in the Yangtze River Basin. ISBN 9789811581076.
- 长江三峡工程 [Yangtze River Three Gorges Dam Project] (in Chinese). Wuhan, Hubei: Yangtze River Publishing House. 2017. ISBN 9787549252749.
- 长江葛洲坝工程关键技术研究与实践 (in Chinese). Wuhan, Hubei: Yangtze River Publishing House. 2014. ISBN 9787549226917.
- 高海拔干旱河谷水土保持生态修复实验研究 [Experimental Study of Ecological Restoration for Water Conservation in Arid Valley at High Altitude Zone] (in Chinese). Wuhan, Hubei: Hubei Science and Technology Press. 2016. ISBN 9787535283481.
- 节水大家谈 (in Chinese). Wuhan, Hubei: Yangtze River Publishing House. 2010. ISBN 9787807082569.
- 农用泵站维修与保养知识小手册 (in Chinese). Wuhan, Hubei: Yangtze River Publishing House. 2000. ISBN 9787549202171.
- 长江水资源保护焦点关注 (in Chinese). Wuhan, Hubei: Yangtze River Publishing House. 2000. ISBN 9787549200412.
- 河道截流及流水中筑坝技术 (in Chinese). Wuhan, Hubei: Hubei Science and Technology Press. 2000. ISBN 9787535239976.
- 抗旱知识手册 (in Chinese). Wuhan, Hubei: Yangtze River Publishing House. 2000. ISBN 9787549202218.
- 长江流域洪水资源利用研究 (in Chinese). Wuhan, Hubei: Yangtze River Publishing House. 2015. ISBN 9787549239115.
- 农村电气化知识问答 (in Chinese). Wuhan, Hubei: Yangtze River Publishing House. 2010. ISBN 9787549202188.
- 农村饮水安全知识问答 (in Chinese). Wuhan, Hubei: Yangtze River Publishing House. 2010. ISBN 9787549202157.
- 节水灌溉新技术知识问答 (in Chinese). Wuhan, Hubei: Yangtze River Publishing House. 2000. ISBN 9787549202164.
- 水土保持知识手册 (in Chinese). Wuhan, Hubei: Yangtze River Publishing House. 2010. ISBN 9787807089438.

== Honours and awards ==
- 1997 Member of the Chinese Academy of Engineering (CAE)
- 2004 Science and Technology Progress Award of the Ho Leung Ho Lee Foundation
- 2017 ICOLD Award
