= Mao Zhi =

Chinese hydraulics engineer

- 茆智
- Born: 20 September 1932; Nanjing, Jiangsu, China
- Died: 13 January 2023 (aged 90); Wuhan, Hubei, China
- Education: Hohai University
- Scientific career
- Fields: Hydraulics
- Workplaces: Wuhan University

Mao Zhi (Chinese: 茆智; pinyin: Máo Zhì; 20 September 1932 – 13 January 2023) was a Chinese engineer in the fields of hydraulics, and an academician of the Chinese Academy of Engineering.

== Biography ==
Mao was born in Nanjing, Jiangsu, on 20 September 1932. At the age of 5, due to the Second Sino-Japanese War, his family passed through Hubei, Hunan, Guizhou and other provinces of China, and went into exile all the way. At the age of 9, they finally came to Hechuan County, Sichuan (now Hechuan District, Chongqing). In 1950, he entered East China Water Conservancy Institute (now Hohai University), where he majored in the Department of Hydraulic Structure.

After university in 1953, Mao taught at the Water Conservancy Department of Hebei Agricultural University, two years later he moved to Wuhan Institute of Water Resources (now College of Water Resources and Hydropower, Wuhan University), where he was later appointed professor in July 2000. He joined the Chinese Communist Party (CCP) in 1988.

On 13 January 2023, Mao died in Wuhan, Hubei, at the age of 90.

== Honors and awards ==
- 2003 Member of the Chinese Academy of Engineering (CAE)
