= Qiantang River Bridge =

Chien Tang River Bridge
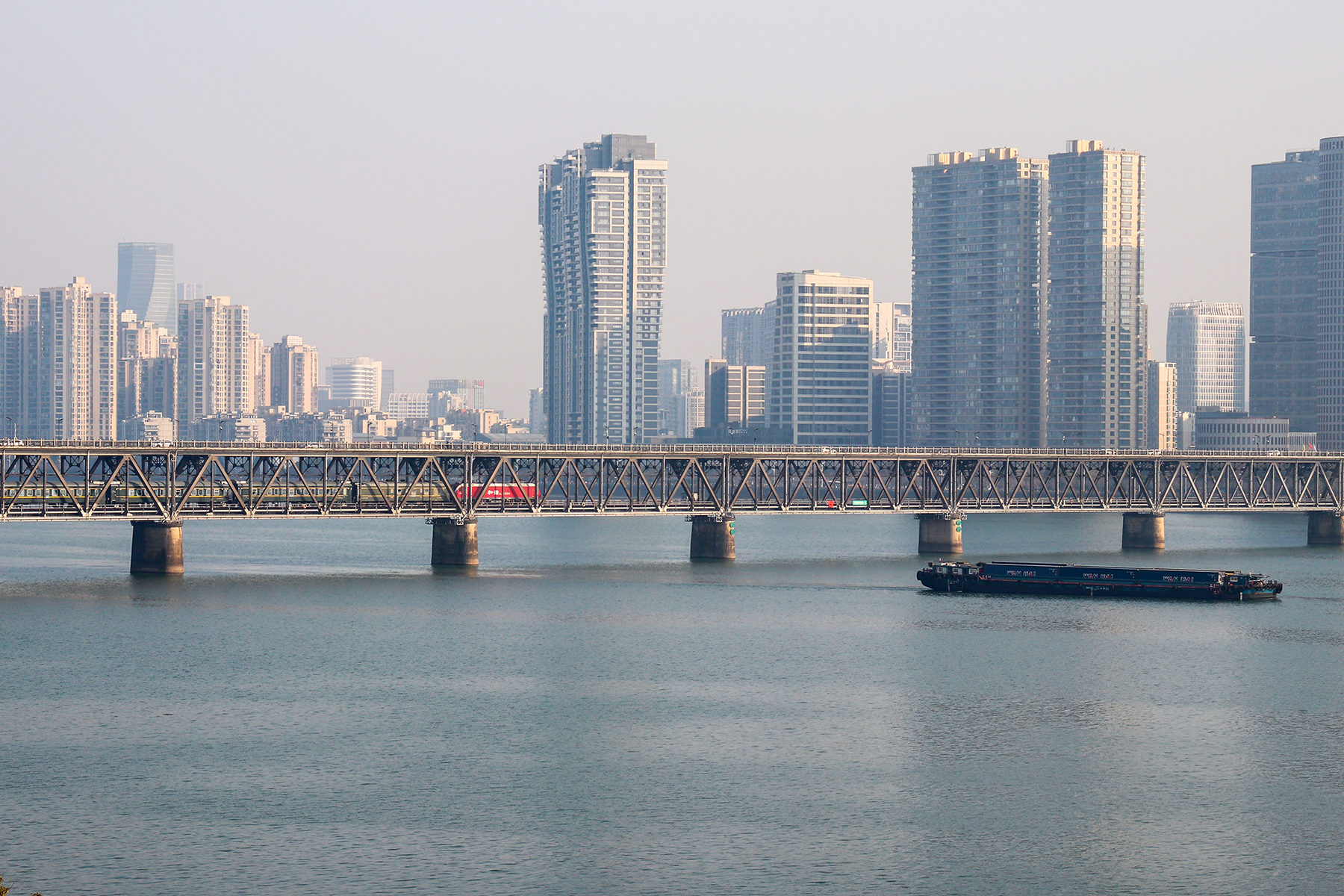
- Qiantang River Bridge in 2024
- Coordinates: 30°11′43″N 120°08′04″E
- Carries: Road and railway
- Crosses: Chien Tang River
- Locale: Hangzhou, China

Characteristics
- Design: double-deck truss bridge
- Total length: 1,072 metres
- Width: 9.1 meters wide

History
- Constructed by: Dorman Long
- Construction end: 29 September 1937
- Opened: 29 September 1937

Location
- Interactive map of Chien Tang River Bridge

The Qiantang River Bridge (Chinese: 钱塘江大桥) is a combined road and railway bridge across the Qiantang River at Hangzhou in Zhejiang Province, China.

== History ==
The bridge was designed by Mao Yisheng and built by Dorman Long. Construction, which started on 8 August 1934 was completed on 29 September 1937. This two-tier truss bridge comprises 16 spans and measures 1,072 metres long.

On 17 November 1937, during the Battle of Shanghai, the Bridge Construction Office were ordered to make preparations to blow up the bridge to delay the advancing Imperial Japanese Army.

== Gallery of images ==
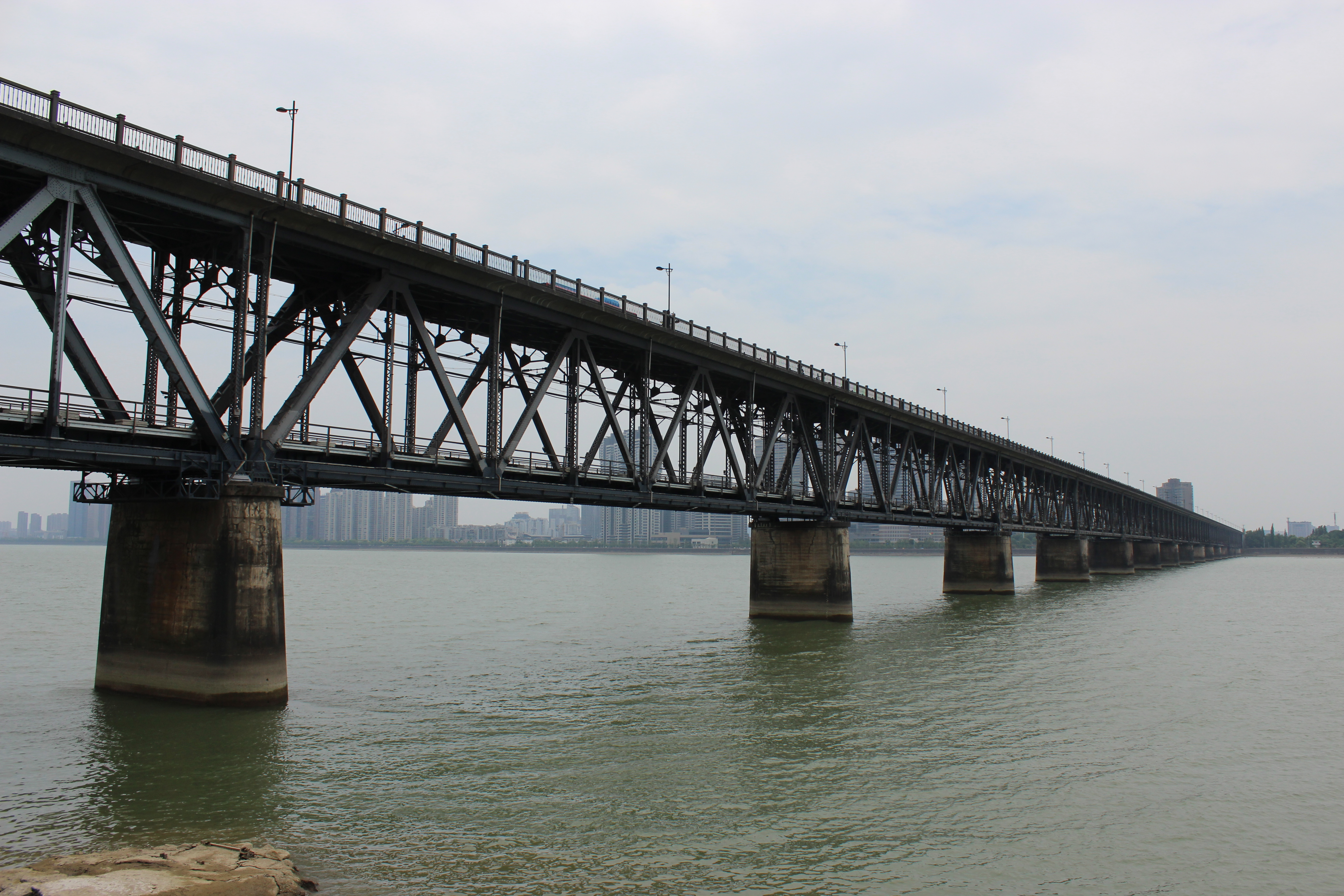
General view

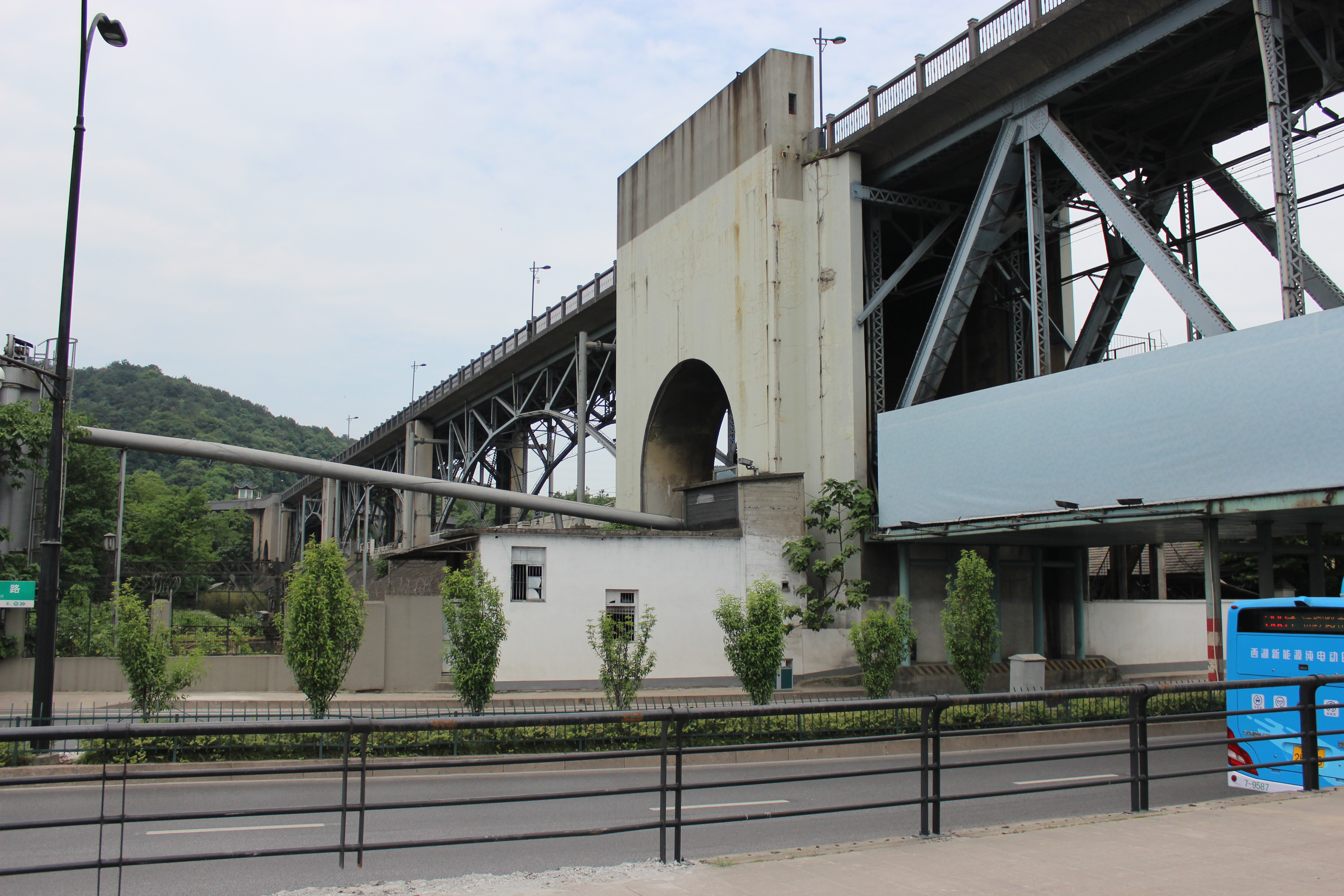
View of the left bank access

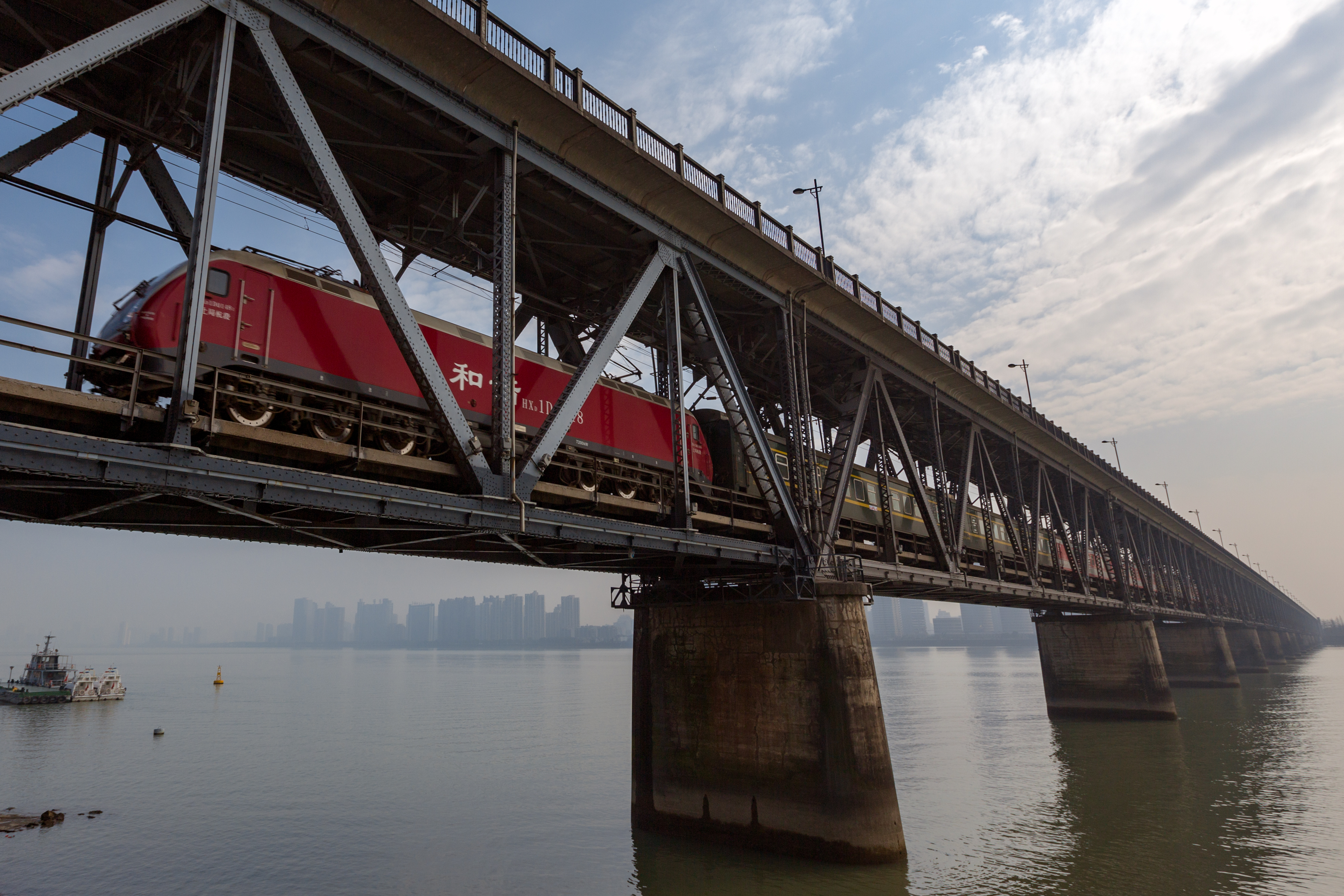
Passing train.

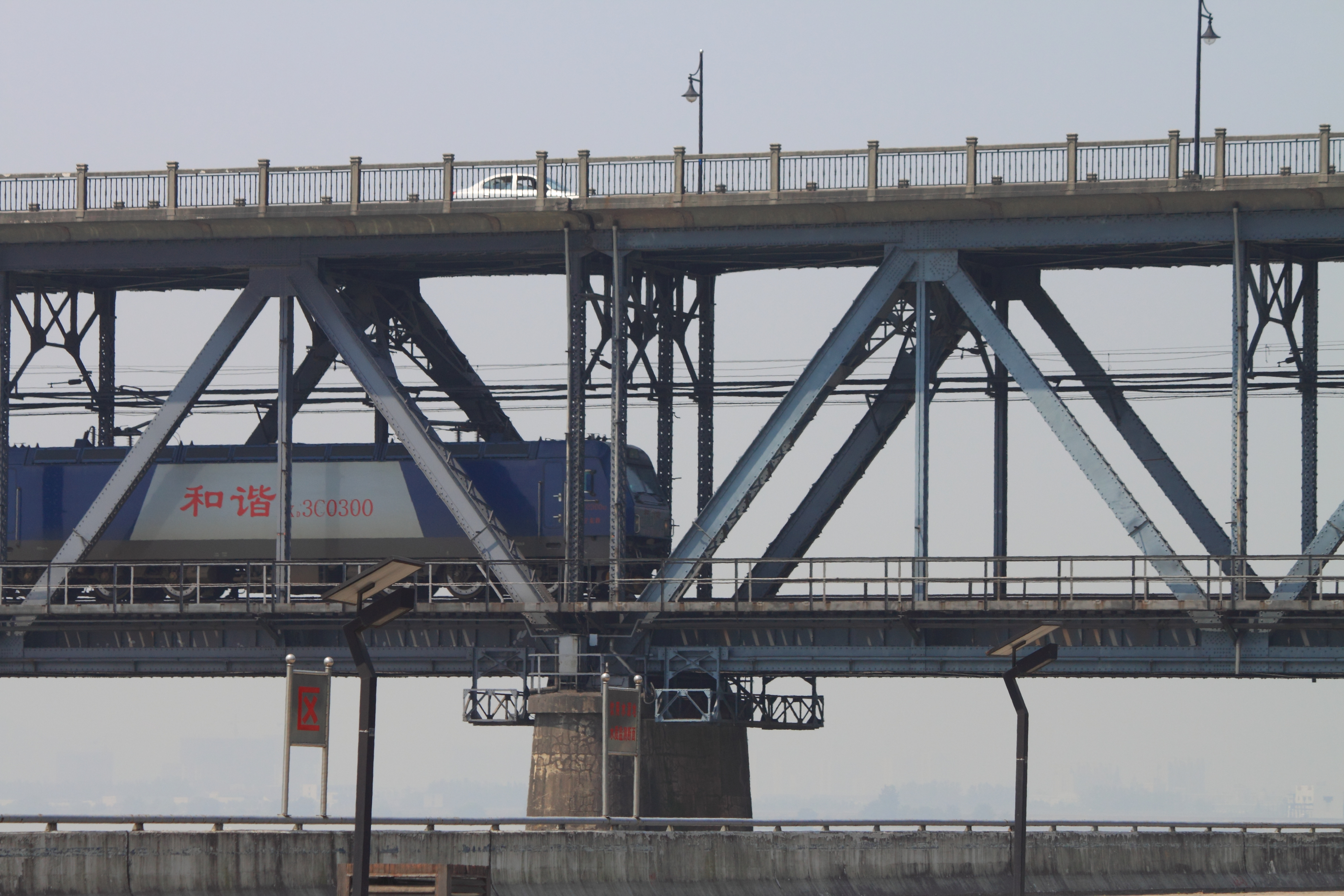
Double deck detail.

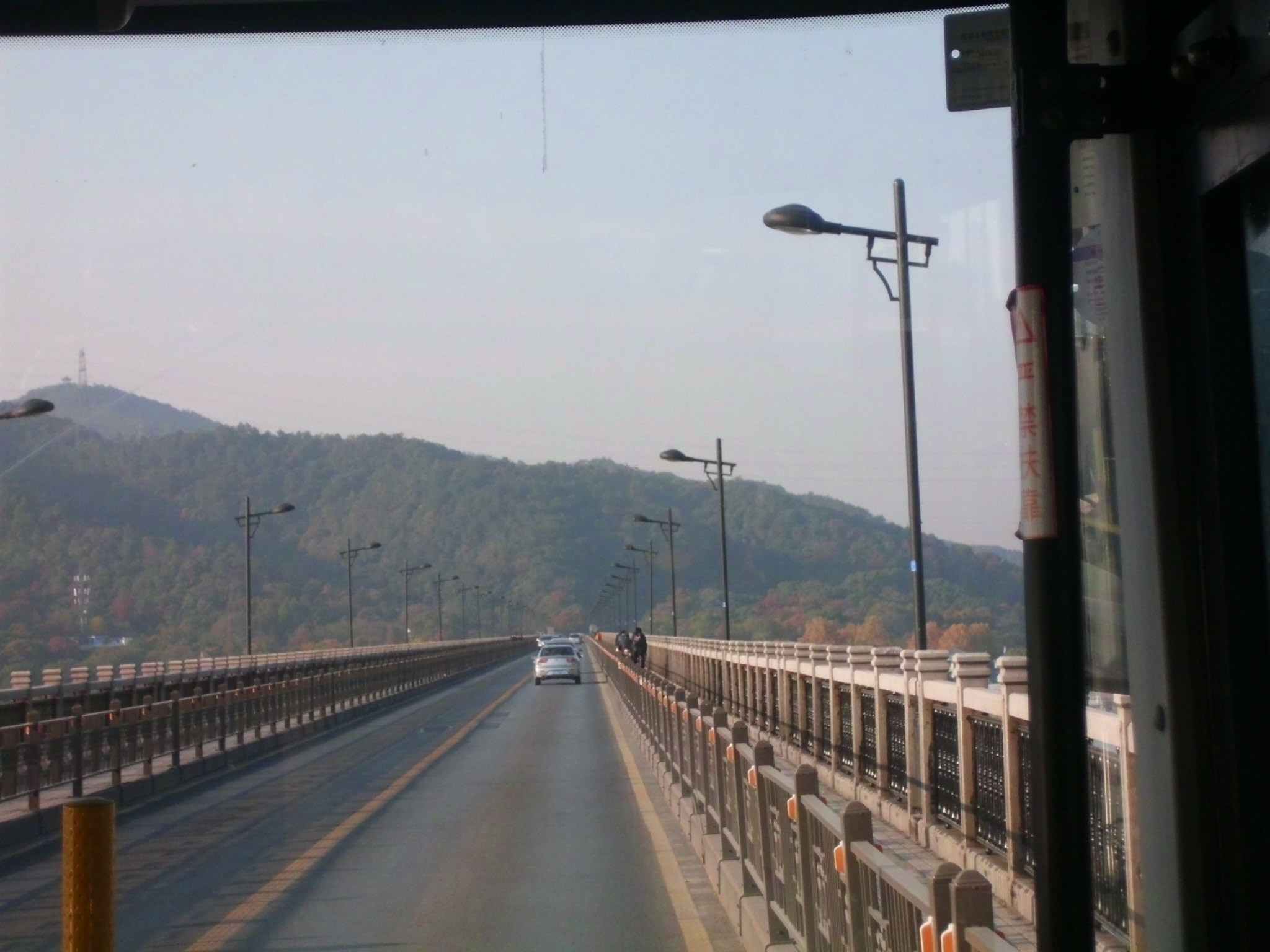
View of the upper deck.

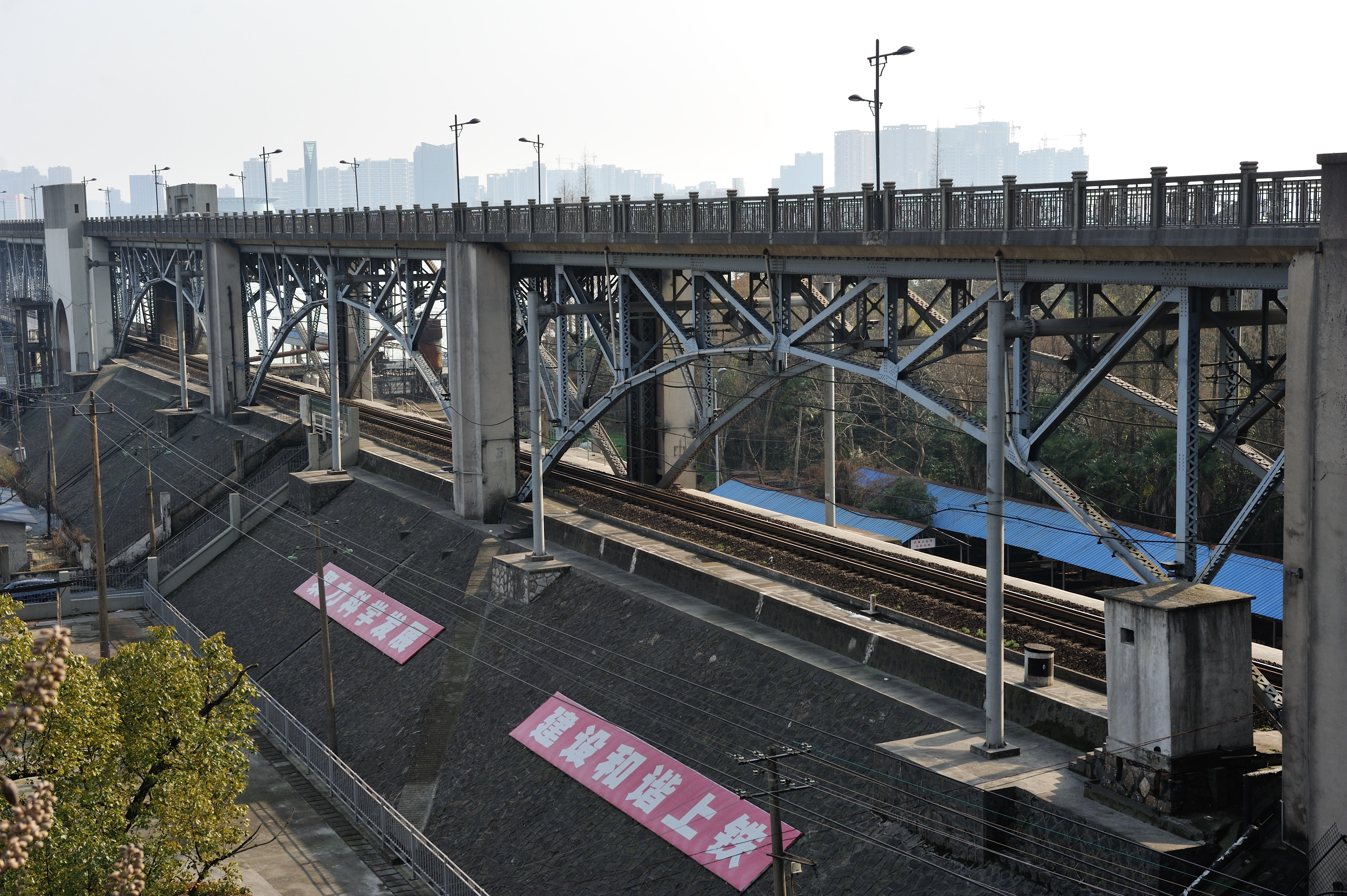
View of the accessa arches on the left bank.

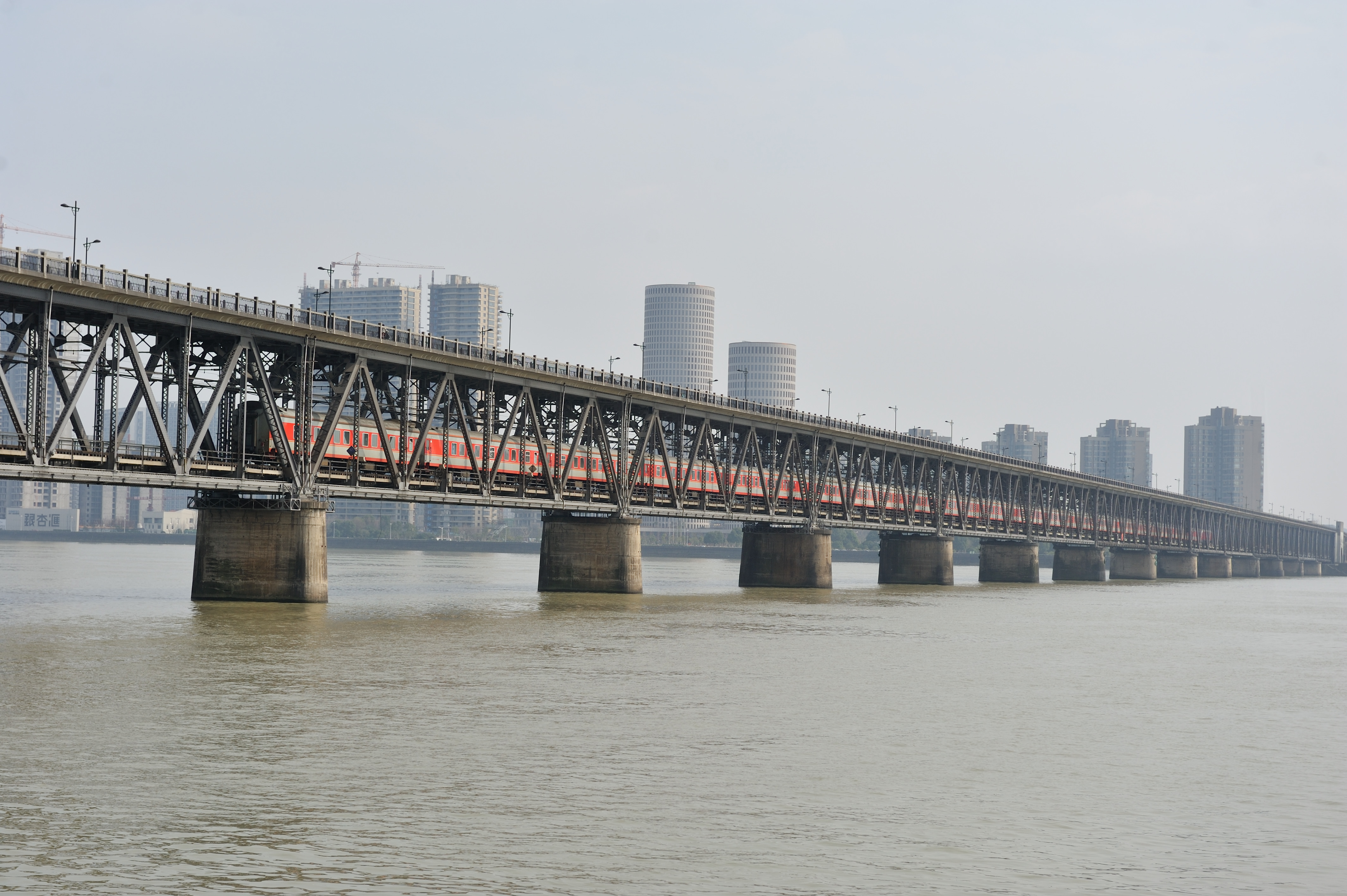
General view with train.

== See also ==
- List of bridges in China

== Sources ==
- Schoppa, Keith (2012). In a Sea of Bitterness: Refugees During the Sino-Japanese War. Harvard University Press. ISBN 978-0674059887.
