= Hohai University =

Public university in Nanjing, Jiangsu, China

Coordinates: 32°03′32″N 118°45′15″E

- 河海大学
- Former names: East China Technical University of Water Resources
- Motto: 艰苦朴素，实事求是，严格要求，勇于探索
- Type: National university
- Established: 1915; 111 years ago
- Chairman: Tang Hongwu
- President: Xu Hui
- Location: Nanjing, Jiangsu, China
- Campus: 1 Xikang Road
- Website: www.hhu.edu.cn

Hohai University
- Simplified Chinese: 河海大学
- Traditional Chinese: 河海大學
Transcriptions
Standard Mandarin
- Hanyu Pinyin: Héhǎi Dàxué

Hohai University (HHU; Chinese: 河海大学; pinyin: Héhǎi Dàxué) is a public university in Nanjing, Jiangsu, China. It is affiliated with the Ministry of Education of China, and co-sponsored by the Ministry of Education, the Ministry of Water Resources, the State Oceanic Administration, and the Jiangsu Provincial People's Government. The university is part of Project 211 and the Double First-Class Construction.

Named after "Hohai (河海)", which literally means river and sea in Chinese, it is a comprehensive university famous in the disciplines related to hydrology, water resources, hydraulic engineering, coastal engineering and marine engineering and has cultivated numerous talents for the development of China's water conservancy.

== History ==
Hohai Civil Engineering School was founded in 1915. Later it was merged with the Department of Engineering of National Southeastern University and became Hohai College of Engineering in 1924. It was incorporated into the Dyisyi Chungshan University, becoming the Department of Water Resources, of later National Central University in 1928.

With the establishment of the People's Republic of China in 1949, it became the Department of Water Resources, Nanjing University. In 1952 the Departments of Water Conservancy, Hydrology, and Water Resources of Nanjing University, Jiaotong University, Tongji University, Zhejiang University and the East China Engineering School of Water Resources were merged into the East China Technical University of Water Resources. In 1985 it became what it is named today, the Hohai University, under the authority of Deng Xiaoping.

== Campuses and facilities ==
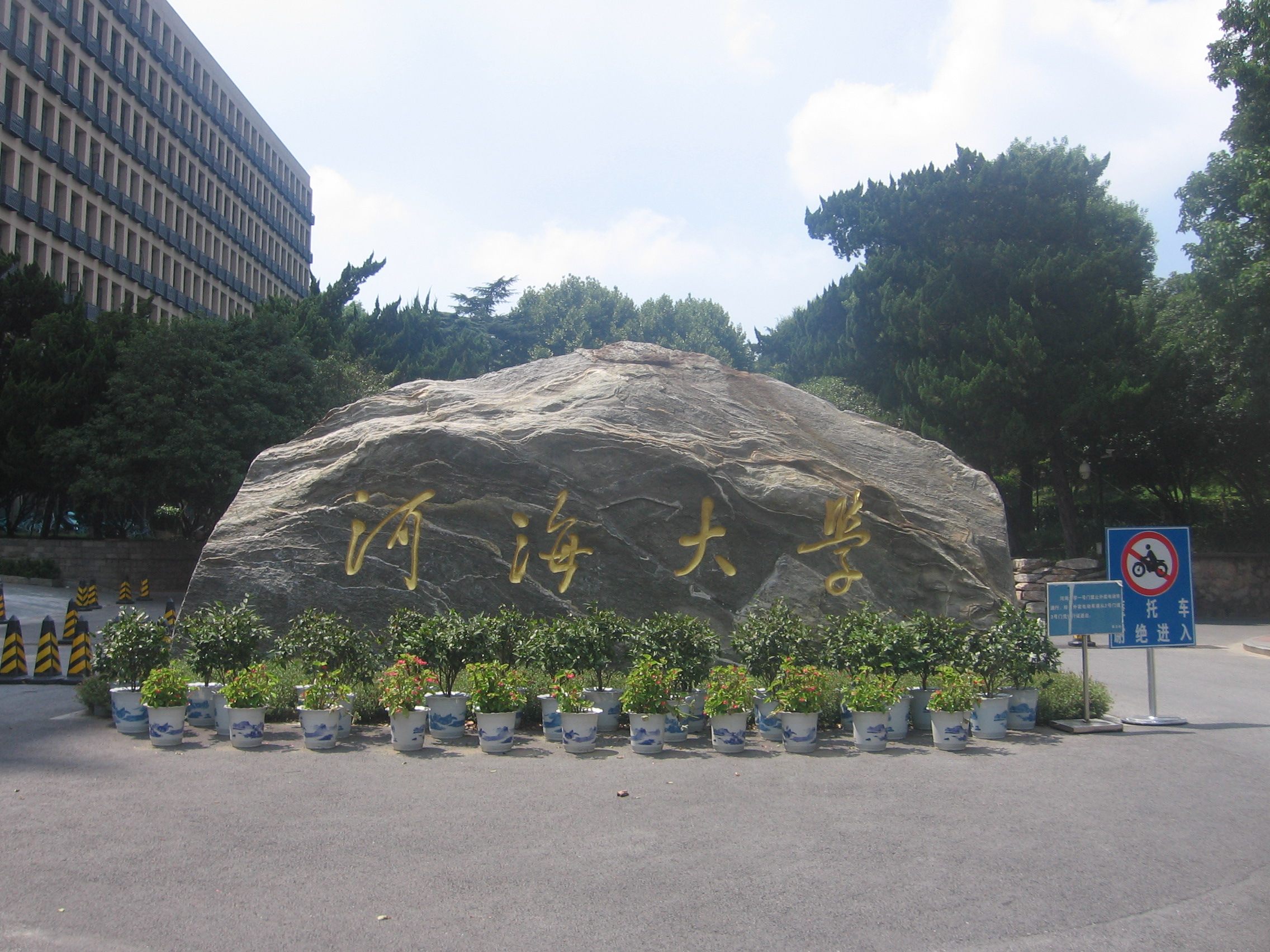
Main Campus

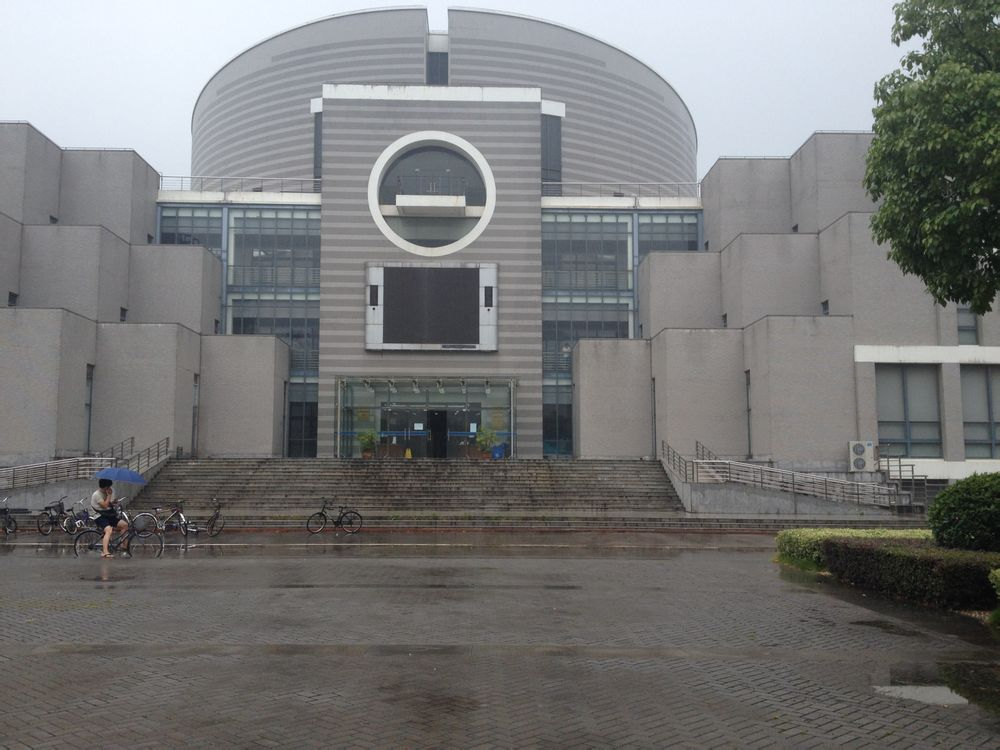
Building in HU

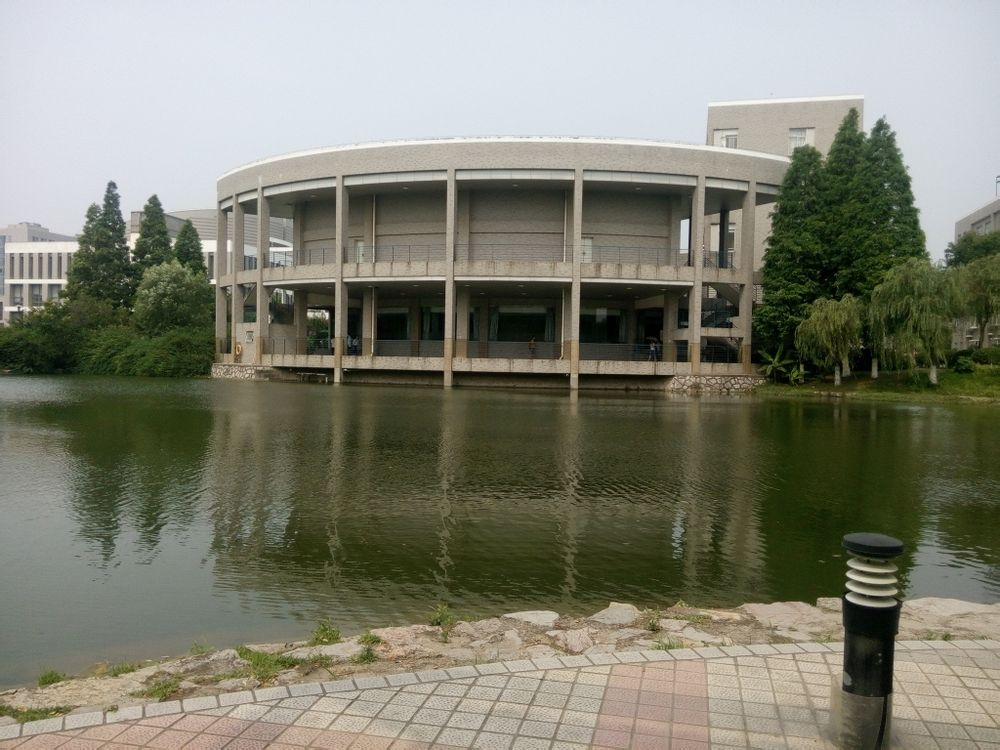
Building in HU

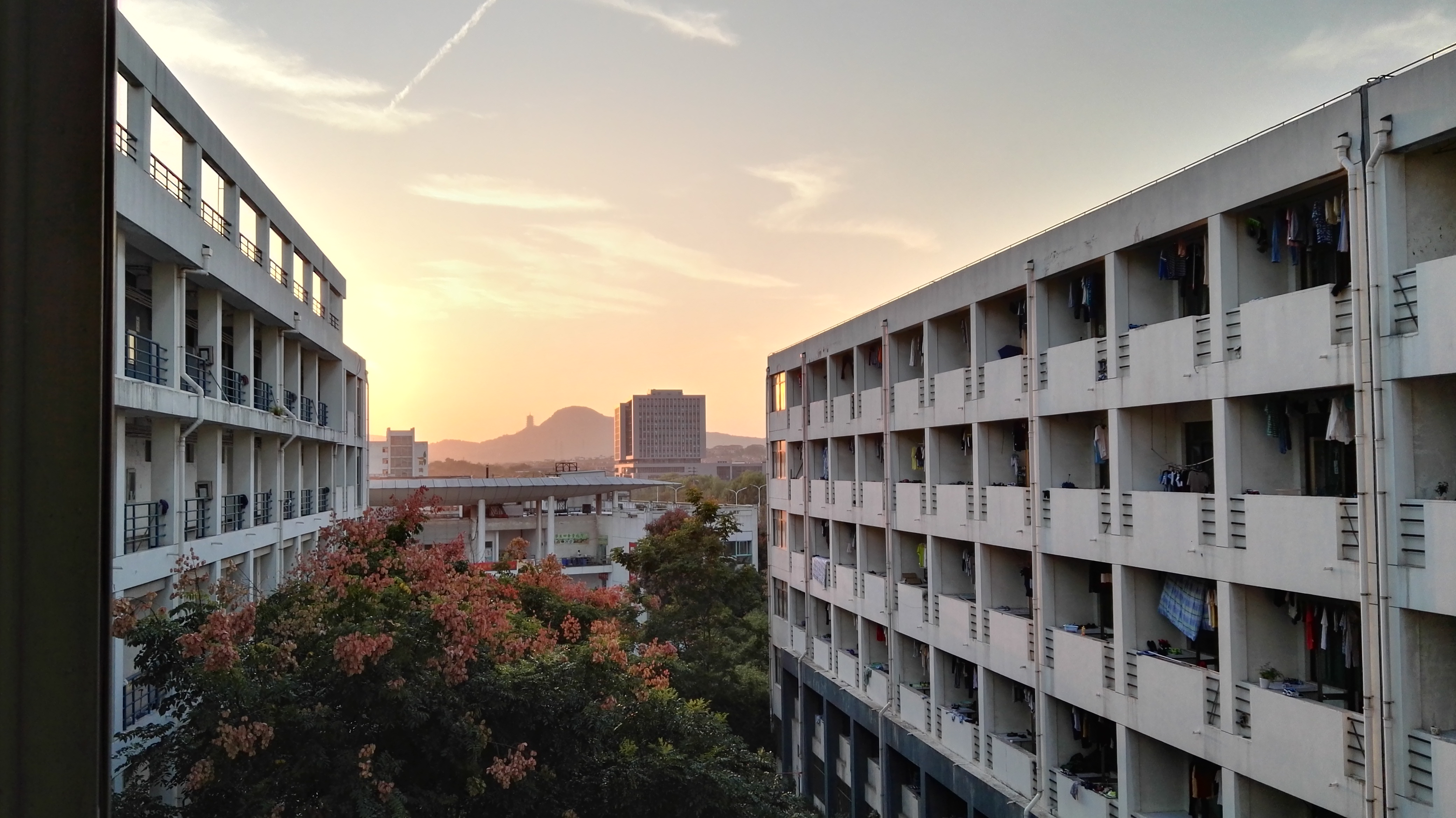
Dormitory of HU

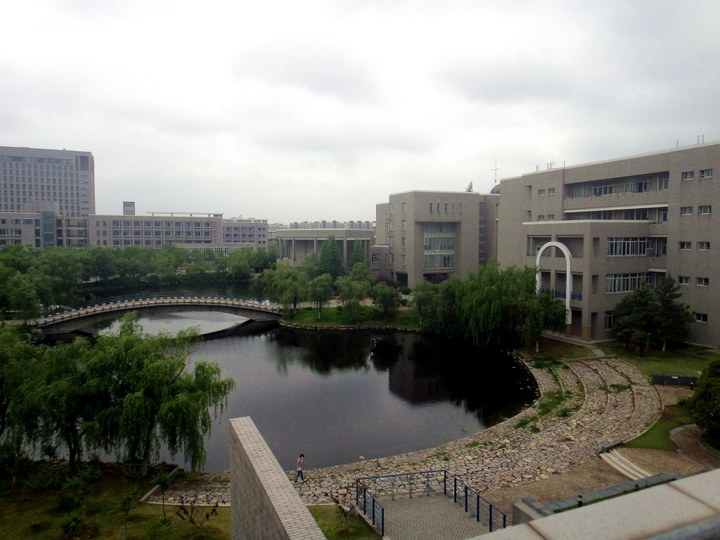
A place in HU

Hohai University has three campuses, occupying a total of 132 hectares (326 acres). The main campus, covering 45 hectares (111 acres), is located at the northern foot of Qingliang Hill in Nanjing. A secondary campus was established in February 1986 in Changzhou, a city between Shanghai and Nanjing. It occupies an area of 30 hectares in the High-Tech Development Zone of Changzhou. A third campus, comprising 57.6 hectares (142 acres) in Jiangning Economic Development Zone of Jiangning District, Nanjing, began operations in September 2001.

Hohai Library consists of three libraries in three campuses with a total area of 47,000 square meters. It has more than 1.85 million books, including 120,000 Chinese and English periodicals, with 567,000 electronic books (including a CD database).

== Colleges and schools ==
Hohai University consists of the following colleges and schools:

- School of Law
- Graduate School
- Business School
- College of Sciences
- College of Environment
- College of Public Administration
- Business School (Changzhou Campus)
- College of Mechanics and Materials
- College of Earth Science and Engineering
- College of Hydrology and Water Resources
- College of Information Science and Engineering
- College of Foreign Languages and Cultures
- College of Energy and Electrical Engineering
- College of Computer and Information Engineering
- College of Civil and Transportation Engineering
- College of Mechanical and Electrical Engineering
- College of Harbour, Coastal and Offshore Engineering
- College of Oceanography
- College of Water Conservancy and Hydropower Engineering
- Department of Physical Education
- Dayu College
- Wentian College (Ma'anshan City)

It has nine state and provincial key laboratories and five state and provincial engineering research centers. There are three state key disciplines, eight provincial and ministerial key disciplines, five post-doctorate mobile stations, 33 Ph.D. programs, 73 Master's programs, 18 Engineering Master's programs and MBA, and 46 undergraduate programs.

== Staff and students ==
There were over 30,000 degree students enrolled at the university in 2005, of which 7,143 were Master and Ph.D. candidates and 18,648 undergraduate students. There are over 3,000 staff members, including one academician of both the Chinese Academy of Engineering and the Chinese Academy of Sciences, one academician of the Chinese Academy of Engineering, 796 professors and associate professors, and 167 doctor's supervisors. Ten academicians are employed as adjunct professors and supervisors for Ph.D. students.

== Research ==
The university has undertaken tasks and research projects for the Chinese government. Such programs include:

- National Natural Science Foundation of China
- National High Technology Research and Development Program (863 Program)
- Special Funds for Major State Basic Research Project (973 Project)
- Advanced Wood Science and Technology for the 21st Century (948 Project)

The university has been involved in large projects concerning water conservancy and hydropower, for instance:

- Three Gorges Dam
- South-to- North Water Diversion Project
- Xiaolangdi hydroelectric power station
- Channel dredging and regulation works for the Yangtze River Estuary
- Project of Huai River Waterway to Ocean

It has been involved in large traffic engineering construction projects such as:

- Nanjing Railway
- Nanjing-Shanghai Expressway
- Expressway in Shanfen
- Guangdong, Changjiang Second Bridge
- Runyang Yangtze River Bridge

Hohai University has won 262 prizes for scientific research work, including 19 state prizes and 185 ministerial and provincial prizes since 1995. More than 11,822 dissertations have been published in academic publications and conferences at home and abroad, over 245 scientific monographs have been printed, and nearly 94 patents has been conferred.

== Cooperation and development ==
Hohai Cooperation and Development Committee was founded in December 2001 in response to the needs for economic construction and social development, to deepen the strength and extent of higher education serving economic construction, and to expand the channels of social participation in running a school.

The former Vice President of the Chinese People's Political Consultative Conference and the first president of the East China Technical University of Water Resources, Ms. Qian Zhengying, participated in the inaugural meeting and was elected the Honorary President of the committee. 24 big names and scholars became commissioners. The 120 unit commissioners are from many enterprises and institutions of the government at all levels, such as departments of water conservancy, electrical power, traffic, environmental protection, education, finance, and army.

== International cooperation ==
Hohai, with its international exchange and cooperation arrangements, was one of the first universities entitled by the State Council to confer the degrees of Doctor, Master and Bachelor upon overseas students. It has trained hundreds of Doctors, Masters and bachelor's degree students for overseas countries and districts, and has established inter-universities cooperative relationships with nearly 50 universities from more than 20 countries and districts.

Hohai University is currently part of the BRICS Universities League.

== Notable alumni ==
- Zhang Wentian, former General Secretary of the Chinese Communist Party, former Vice Minister of Foreign Affairs of the People's Republic of China
- Mao Yisheng, structural engineer (regarded as the founder of modern bridge engineering in China) and social activist, member of the Chinese Academy of Engineering
- Xu Zhilun, engineer and educator, member of Chinese Academy of Science
- Wen Fubo, water conservancy engineer, member of the Chinese Academy of Engineering
- Mao Zhi, irrigation and drainage engineer, member of the Chinese Academy of Engineering
- Wu Zhongru, hydraulic structure engineer, member of the Chinese Academy of Engineering
- Zheng Shouren, water conservancy and hydro-power engineer, member of the Chinese Academy of Engineering
