= Mao Yushi =

Chinese economist

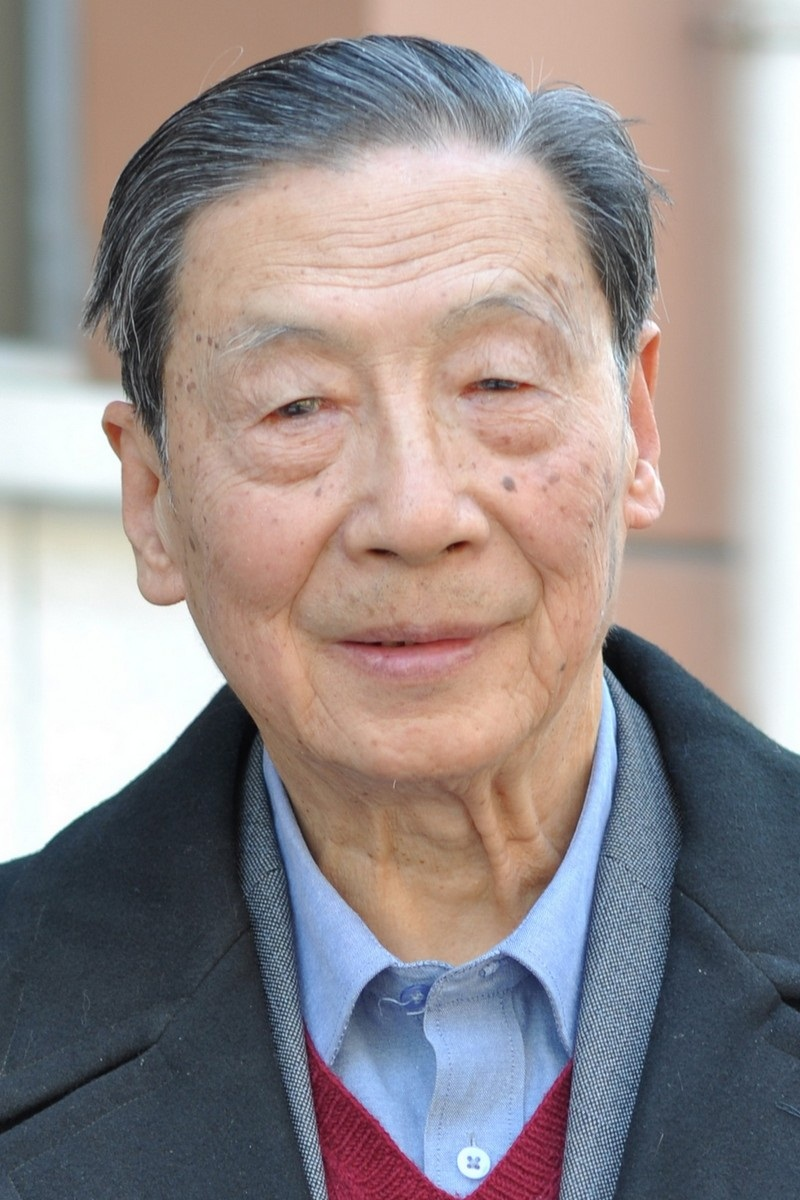
- Born: 14 January 1929 (age 97); Nanjing, China
- Education: Shanghai Jiao Tong University
- Relatives: Mao Yisheng (uncle)
- Awards: Milton Friedman Liberty Prize

Mao Yushi (Chinese: 茅于轼; born 14 January 1929) is a Chinese economist. Mao graduated from Shanghai Jiao Tong University in 1950 and was labeled a 'rightist' in 1958. In 1986, Mao was a visiting scholar at Harvard University, and in 1990, Mao was a senior lecturer at Queensland University.

== Career ==
He co-founded the Unirule Institute of Economics, which educated new and old generations of Chinese on the importance of private property, freedom of choice, voluntary exchange, rule of law, and other aspects of the free market economy, teaching how to transition away from central planning. On 4 May 2012, Mao Yushi was awarded the Cato Institute's Milton Friedman Prize for Advancing Liberty for his work in classical liberalism and free-market economics. In October 2014, Beijing began a "crackdown on dissent" by banning the publication of his works. In January 2017, they also shut down his website.

=== Criticism of Mao Zedong ===
Mao Yushi wrote an online column criticizing the communist and totalitarian policies of Mao Zedong in China. He was attacked by Maoists in the country, who called for his arrest.

=== Move to Canada ===
Mao Yushi had been suppressed for a long time because his speech and ideological views are not compatible with the Chinese authorities. In January 2024, at the age of 95, he left China and settled in Vancouver, Canada, and stated that he would never return to China.

== Family ==
Mao's uncle was the famous engineer Mao Yisheng.
