= Jinlong Gong =

Chinese chemist and professor of chemical engineering

Jinlong Gong (Chinese: 巩金龙; born June 1979) is a Chinese chemist and professor of chemical engineering at Tianjin University. He is best known for his work in the areas of heterogeneous catalysis, surface science, and hydrogen energy.

== Biography ==
Gong was born in Lanzhou, Gansu province in 1979.

== Education ==
Gong received his B.S. and M.S. (with Xinbin Ma) degrees from Tianjin University in 2001, 2004 respectively and earned a Ph.D. in chemical engineering from the University of Texas at Austin in 2008. Under the tutelage of Buddie Mullins, Gong' graduate work focused on the understanding the surface oxidation reaction on gold-based model catalysts.

== Research at Harvard ==
Gong joined the George Whitesides' group at Harvard and completed his postdoctoral training in August 2010. His research focuses on nanoindentation lithography and CO_{2} conversion based on one-electron mechanism.

== Research at Tianjin University ==
Gong began his independent career as a professor at Tianjin University in 2010 and is currently holding a Pei Yang Professorship. He maintains an active research group of over 30 graduate and postdoctoral students with three research associate professors. According to the biography on his Web site, Gong's current research interests include catalytic synthesis and utilization of hydrogen as well as conversion of COx.

== Awards and achievements ==
Gong is the author of more than 120 scientific articles and is listed as an inventor on more than 40 patents. He serves on the editorial advisory boards of several scientific journals, including Chemical Society Reviews, Chemical Science, AIChE Journal, Scientific Reports, Science China Materials, and Frontiers of Chemical Science and Engineering. He was a past associate editor for Journal of Natural Gas Science and Engineering (2010-2014) and currently serves as an associate editor for Chemical Engineering Science, Journal of Chemical Technology and Biotechnology, Renewable Energy, and International Journal of Hydrogen Energy.

Gong is an elected fellow of the Royal Society of Chemistry (FRSC) (2012). Among other awards, Gong is the recipient of the Te-Pan Hou Chemical Engingeering Innovation Award (2014), the NSFC's Excellent Young Investigator Award (2012), the Scopus Young Investigator Award (2012), and the IUPAC Prize for Young Chemists – Honorable Mention Award (2010).
