= Xu Zhilun =

- 徐芝纶
- Born: 20 June 1911; Jiangdu County, Jiangsu, Qing China
- Died: 26 August 1999 (aged 88); Nanjing, Jiangsu, China
- Education: Tsinghua University; Massachusetts Institute of Technology; Harvard University
- Scientific career
- Fields: Applied mechanics
- Workplaces: Hohai University
- Notable students: Zhao Guofan

Chinese name
- Simplified Chinese: 徐芝纶
- Traditional Chinese: 徐芝綸
Transcriptions
Standard Mandarin
- Hanyu Pinyin: Xú Zhīlún

Xu Zhilun (20 June 1911 – 26 August 1999) was a Chinese mechanics and educator who was a professor and doctoral supervisor at Hohai University. He was an academician of the Chinese Academy of Sciences.

He was a delegate to the 3rd National People's Congress. He was a member of the 5th, 6th, 7th National Committee of the Chinese People's Political Consultative Conference.

== Biography ==
Xu was born into a highly educated family in the town of Shaobo, in Jiangdu County, Jiangsu, on 20 June 1911. He was fascinated by Chinese literature since childhood. In 1919, his family moved to Yangzhou and one year later moved again to Nanjing, where he finished primary school in a missionary school. His family settled in Beijing in 1923. He elementary studied at Beijing Private Zhicheng Middle School (北京私立志成中学) and secondary studied at the High School Affiliated to Beijing Normal University and Beijing Huiwen High School (北平汇文中学). In 1930, he was admitted to the Department of Civil Engineering, Tsinghua University. In 1935, he pursued advanced studies in the United States on government scholarships, first earning master's degree from Massachusetts Institute of Technology in 1936 and then master's degree from Harvard University in 1937.

On 7 July 1937, the Marco Polo Bridge Incident broke out, which marked the full invasion of the Republic of China by the Empire of Japan. He declined the sincere invitation of two MIT mentors with superior conditions, and gave up the opportunity to continue to study for a doctorate. In June 1937, he returned to China and taught at Zhejiang University. He joined the Chinese Institute of Engineers in 1941. In 1943, he was recruited by the Hydropower Survey Corps of Chongqing Resources Commission as an engineer. He participated in the preliminary design of the Three Gorges Project presided over by the Americans. He became a professor at the National Central University in 1944 and one year later moved to Chiao Tung University, where he served as director of Water Conservancy Department in 1948.

After the founding of the Communist State, in 1950, he joined the labor union organization in Shanghai. In 1951, he attended a symposium held by Shanghai Mayor Chen Yi. In 1952, he participated in establishment of East China Water Conservancy Institute (now Hohai University). He joined the Jiusan Society in 1954 and the Communist Party in September 1981, respectively.

In January 1999, he entered Jiangsu Provincial People's Hospital for treatment because of chest pain. He died on 26 August 1999, aged 88.

== Publications ==
- 弹性力学 [Elasticity] (in Chinese). Beijing: Higher Education Press. 2016. ISBN 978-7-04-044689-0.
- 弹性力学简明教程 [A Concise Course in Elasticity] (in Chinese). Beijing: Higher Education Press. 2018. ISBN 9787040498714.

== Honours and awards ==
- 1980 Member of the Chinese Academy of Sciences (CAS)
