= Sheng Aiyi =

Chinese entrepreneur

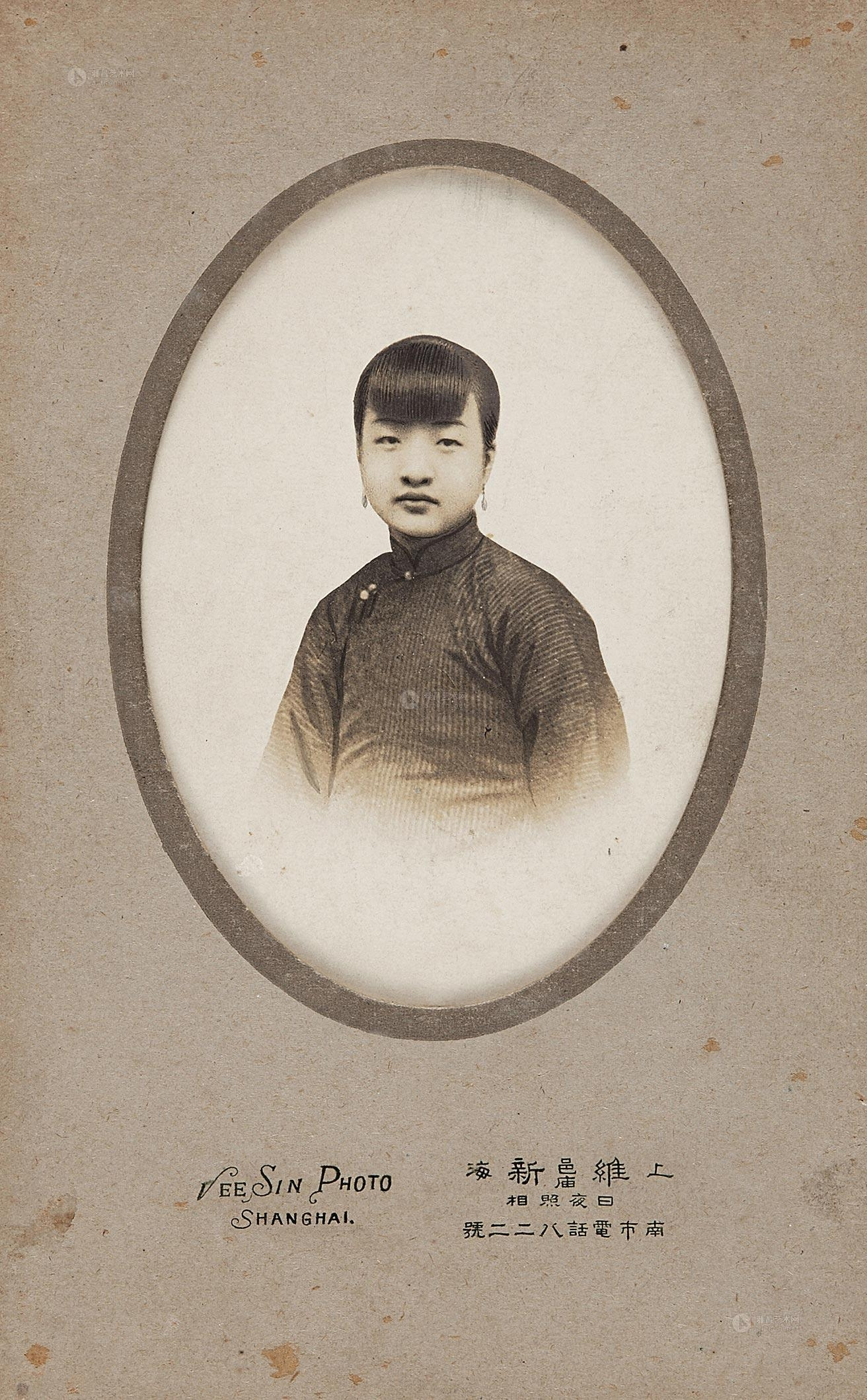
- Born: 1900
- Died: 1983 (aged 82–83)
- Education: Shanghai Jiao Tong University
- Occupation: entrepreneur
- Title: Shanghai BaiLeMen (General Manager)
- Parent: Sheng Xuanhuai

Sheng Aiyi (Chinese: 盛爱颐; pinyin: Shèng Àiyí; 1900–1983), was the first female Chinese entrepreneur in the entertainment industry, becoming the general manager of Shanghai BaiLeMen company. She was also a member of the school board of the Shanghai Jiao Tong University (the original Nan Yang College of Chiao Tung). She was the seventh daughter of Sheng Xuanhuai, Shanghai's biggest capitalist at that time.

== Biography ==
Sheng Aiyi lost her father when she was 16 years old. She was admitted to Shanghai St. John's university already possessing knowledge of English and skills such as drawing Chinese pictures, handwriting and embroidery. She established herself in Shanghai when she was less than 20 years old.

== Relationships ==
As a talented woman of an era, Sheng Aiyi was pursued by many men, the most famous one was the affair with T. V. Soong, the brother of Soong Mei-ling. However, at that time T. V. Soong was just a poor boy back abroad and then became the personal secretary of Sheng Enyi (Sheng Aiyi's brother). T. V. Soong and Sheng Aiyi then fell in love with each other, but it was strongly rejected by Mrs. Sheng because of Song's inferior household. So later T. V. Soong went to Guangzhou to seek his fortune and Sheng Aiyi promised him not to marry any other men before his return. He then served as governor of the Central Bank of China and minister of finance In the Kuomintang-controlled government and married to Lo-Yi Chang (張樂怡 Zhang Leyi), ignoring the fact that Sheng Aiyi was still waiting for him.

== Events ==
In September 1927, Mrs. Zhuang died of an illness, and Sheng Aiyi's three brothers, namely Sheng Enyi, Sheng Shengyi and Sheng Zhongyi, declared all the property to themselves, excluding her from the inheritance. Much to their surprise, Sheng Aiyi was a modern woman, and she took his three brothers and two nephews to court in June 1928, making her the first woman in China's history to practice law to protect women's rights. With the support of Soong Ching-ling and Soong Ai-ling, Sheng Aiyi won the case and got her rightful share of the property. The lawsuit had important significance for setting a precedent for women's right to inheritance. In 1932, she built the six-floor Paramount ballroom with the money she won from the case. It was said that the mayor of Shanghai also attended the opening ceremony. It became one of the most famous luxurious entertainment clubs in Shanghai. Many KMT officials joined the club, and even Soong Mei-ling often had reception banquets there.
