= Tianjin University =

Public research university in Tianjin, China

Coordinates: 39.107°N 117.162°E

- 天津大学
- Seal of the University
- Former names: Peiyang University (北洋大學); National Peiyang University (北洋大學校/國立北洋大學); Imperial Tientsin University (天津北洋西學學堂/北洋大學堂)
- Motto: 實事求是
- Motto in English: Seeking Truth from Facts
- Type: Public
- Established: October 2, 1895; 131 years ago
- Affiliations: Excellence League
- President: Chai Liyuan
- Party Secretary: Yang Xianjin (杨贤金)
- Faculty: 4,374
- Undergraduates: 15,000
- Postgraduates: 9,000
- Location: Tianjin, China
- Colors: Peiyang Blue
- Website: tju.edu.cn

Chinese name
- Simplified Chinese: 天津大学
- Traditional Chinese: 天津大學
Transcriptions
Standard Mandarin
- Hanyu Pinyin: Tiānjīn Dàxué
- Bopomofo: ㄊㄧㄢ ㄐㄧㄣ ㄉㄚˋ ㄒㄩㄝˊ
- Wade–Giles: T'ien^{1}-chin^{1} Ta^{4}-hsüeh^{2}
- Tongyong Pinyin: Tianjin Dà-syué
- IPA: [tʰjɛ́n.tɕín tâ.ɕɥě]
other Mandarin
- Xiao'erjing: تْيَانْ جىنْدَاشُوَي

Tianjin University (TJU; 天津大学), previously Peiyang University (北洋大學), is a national public research university in Tianjin, China. Established in 1895 by a royal charter from the Guangxu Emperor, Tianjin University is the oldest university in China, leading the country's significant shift towards modernization and development. The university is affiliated with and funded by the Ministry of Education of China. It is part of Project 211, Project 985, and the Double First-Class Construction.

Originally established as Imperial Tientsin University and later known as Peiyang University, the institution was founded to provide modern education in engineering and mining, later expanding to include programs in science, business, law, humanities, and other disciplines. The establishment of Tianjin University marked a turning point in Chinese history, as it represented a significant shift towards modernization and the adoption of Western educational models.

In 1951 after the establishment of the People's Republic of China, by an order of the Chinese Communist government, the university was renamed Tianjin University. It serves as one of the largest multidisciplinary engineering universities in China and one of the first 16 national key universities accredited by the central government in 1959.

== History ==
In 1895, Sheng Xuanhuai submitted his memorial to the Guangxu Emperor to request for approval to set up a modern higher education institution in Tianjin. After approval on October 2, 1895, Peiyang Western Study College was founded by him and American educator Charles Daniel Tenney and later developed to Peiyang University. It was the first university providing four year degree modern higher education in China. The university modeled itself on the famous American Universities and aimed to rejuvenate China by training qualified personnel with new scientific and technological knowledge. After the PR China's foundation and university restructures, Peiyang University was renamed Tianjin University in 1951.

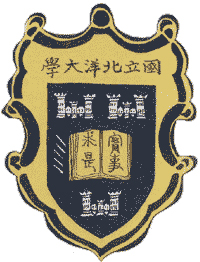
Peiyang University logo

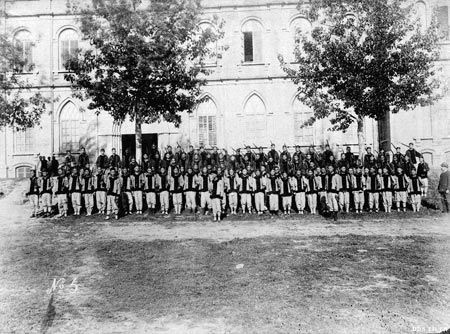
Peiyang University, 1900

Peiyang University, and later Tianjin University, contributed greatly to Chinese society. In its early days, undergraduates had the permission to directly pursue graduate study at Harvard and Yale without any entrance exams. Its law school, which was the first and, at the time, best law school in China, was merged into Peking University and gave Peking University a fresh new start. Peiyang's Department of Aeronautics was separated and developed into Beihang University.

=== Timeline ===
- 1895 Peiyang University founded
- 1900 The first modern diploma in China granted
- 1907 Developed into a comprehensive university integrating Engineering with Liberal Arts, Law and Education.
- 1935 The first group of graduate students enrolled
- 1937 The first master's degree conferred
- 1951 Merged with Hebei Institute of Technology, renamed as Tianjin University
- 1958 The first library (floor area of 14423 m^{2}) established
- 1959 Became one of the first 16 National Key Universities
- 1981 The first group of PhD students enrolled
- 1984 The graduate school founded
- 1985 The first doctor's degree conferred
- 1995 100th anniversary
- 1999 National University Science Park built to facilitate knowledge transfer
- 2000 Became one of the first batch of universities under "985" Project
- 2009 Bachelor of Engineering (BEng) degree program in Chemical Engineering accredited by IchemE (Institution of Chemical Engineers)
- 2010 Tianjin University New Campus Plan Launched
- 2013 Tianjin Co-Innovation Center of Chemical Science and Engineering (COIC_CSE) became one of the first 14 collaborative innovation centers of the "2011" Project
- 2015 120th anniversary and new campus (Peyang Yuan) completed
- 2017 Listed by "the World First Class University and First Class Academic Discipline Construction"
- 2021 Listed by "the World First Class University and First Class Academic Discipline Construction" again

=== Building of disciplines ===
As of 2023, the university has 6 national key disciplines and 17 municipal key disciplines.

For the time being, the university has 12 first-grade disciplines and 49 second-grade disciplines that confer Doctoral degree, 87 disciplines conferring master's degree, 17 engineering disciplines conferring master's degree in engineering. The university also confers master's degrees in business administration (MBA) and public administration (MPA). At present there are 15 postdoctoral research programs, 4 national key laboratories, 1 national engineering research center, 2 technology research and promotion centers of national scientific and technological achievements, 7 engineering technological R&D centers and open laboratories at ministerial level.

In June 2001, the university was evaluated by the expert panel of the Ministry of Education as having successfully completed all the construction items set by "211-Project" for the Ninth Five-Year Plan Period.

=== Scientific and technological achievements ===
The university has five key national laboratories, one national engineering research center, two national promotion centers for scientific and technological achievements, seven engineering research and development centers and open laboratories at ministerial level. There are over 80 laboratories, 110 research institutes, 15 experimental research and engineering development centers at the university.

Since the reform and opening up, hundreds of scientific and technological achievements of the university have won prizes. Among them, 70 won the National Natural Science Award, the National Invention Award, or the Award of National Science and Technology Progress, and 510 won the awards of science and technology progress of the Ministry of Education or at provincial or ministerial level. 393 have applied for patents, of which 278 have been patented. In 2001, the Science and Technology Park of Tianjin University became one of the 22 university sci-tech parks in China. A scientific research system consisting of basic research, applied research and R&D has been formed at the university. The university's annual amount of financial aid received from the National Natural Science Foundation always ranks top among China's engineering institutions of higher learning. Great achievements have been made in transforming scientific and technological achievements into productive forces. The university has established extensive cooperative relations with many large and medium-sized enterprises at home. In 2000 the university's funds for science and technology amounted to RMB 280 million.

=== High-tech industries ===
In 2020, professor Zhang Hao (張浩) was convicted in the U.S. on charges of stealing trade secrets on behalf of his firm and Tianjin University. The stolen trade secrets allowed his company and Tianjin to unfairly compete in the global radio frequency filter market. In 2009 Zhang Hao and his accomplice Pang Wei (龐慰) who were both professors at Tianjin University cooperated with the university to found a company named Novana using the stolen information.

== Rankings and reputation ==
University rankings
BCUR National	Domestic	20
Wu Shulian National	Domestic	17
CUAA National	Alumni	22
QS National	General	12
THE National	General	14–19
QS Asia (Asia version)	General	57
THE Asia (Asia version)	General	=32
ARWU World	Research	98
QS World	General	=257
THE World	General	201–250
USNWR World	General	=182

Tianjin University is one of the former Project 985 Chinese institutions that made it into the top 500 universities in the world rankings. As of 2024, Tianjin University was ranked No.172 worldwide in terms of aggregate performance from the three most widely observed university rankings (THE+ARWU+QS) as reported by the Aggregate Ranking of Top Universities.

In the 2022 U.S. News & World Report Best Global University Ranking, a number of disciplines and subjects at Tianjin University are ranked in the global top 300th including:

- Polymer Science No.9
- Energy and Fuels No.14
- Nanoscience and Nanotechnology No.14
- Chemical Engineering No.15
- Physical Chemistry No.17
- Mechanical Engineering No.20
- Condensed Matter Physics No.20
- Chemistry No.23
- Civil Engineering No.36
- Engineering No.38
- Materials Science No.45
- Electrical and Electronic Engineering No.48
- Optics No.53
- Biotechnology and Applied Microbiology No.69
- Computer Science No.129
- Mathematics No.223
- Environment/Ecology No.230
- Biology and Biochemistry No.273
- Geosciences No.302

== Cooperation and exchanges ==
Tianjin University was one of the first universities in China to explore cooperation with external organizations, and conducts extensive international exchanges and cooperation, keeping close relations with many institutions of higher learning, educational institutions, and transnational enterprises worldwide. The university has established cooperative relations with provinces and cities such as Hebei Province, Jilin Province, Xinjiang, Tibet, and Chongqing Municipality. Its scientific and technological cooperation can be found all over the country. The university strengthens its cooperation with transnational industrial groups in the high-tech fields. Meanwhile, the university has signed cooperation agreements with more than 20 transnational companies, and with 80 institutions of higher learning from 28 countries, conducting academic exchanges, cooperative scientific research and joint training programs.

The university invites famous scholars and celebrities to be its honorary or guest professors. To name a few, Prof. Herbert A. Simon, Nobel Prize winner of the Psychology Department of Carnegie Mellon University; Professor Gerald Vizenor, emeritus professor of American literature at the University of New Mexico (Vizenor portrayed Tianjin University in his novel Griever: An American Monkey King in China); Dr. Yang Zhenning, famous physicist of the State University of New York; academician, world-famous mathematician Lin Jiaqiao; Mazuopin Kalin, professor of the Electrical Machinery Department of Yale University; Li Dingyi, professor of AT&T Bell Laboratory. In recent years, the university has sponsored or undertaken more than a dozen large international academic conferences, which create more channels for the university to promote international exchanges and cooperation.

Tianjin University also cooperated with University of South Australia to build China-Australia Centre for Sustainable Urban Development at October 27, 2012.

== Notable alumni ==
- Wang Ch'ung-hui, jurist, diplomat and politician
- Tang Shaoyi, assassinated statesman
- Ma Yinchu, economist
- Shu-tian Li, engineer and president of Peiyang
- Xu Zhimo, poet
- Jinlong Gong, chemist and professor
- Zhang Tailei, leader of the Guangzhou Uprising
- Chen Lifu, bureaucrat, politician, and anti-communist
- Wang Zhengting, diplomat
- Huang Jiqing, geologist
- Shixin Jack Hu, engineer who is the senior vice president for academic affairs and provost at the University of Georgia
- Larry Yung, former chairman of CITIC Pacific
- Sun Guangxin, billionaire businessman
- XinMo Li, contemporary artist
- Feigang Fei, restaurateur

== See also ==
- Asteroid 8917 Tianjindaxue, named for the Tianjin University
- President of Tianjin University
