= National Hohai Technology University =

Former university in Nanking, China

National Hohai Technology University (國立河海工科大學) was a university in Nanking, which existed between 1924 and 1927.

National Hohai Technology University (Chinese: 國立河海工科大學) was a national university in Nanjing, China, that existed from 1924 to 1927. It was created through the merger of the Engineering College of National Southeastern University and the Hohai Engineering Specialized School, the latter having been founded in 1915 as China's first higher education institution specializing in water conservancy engineering. The university's first president was the engineer and bridge designer Mao Yisheng (茅以升). In 1927, during the reorganization of higher education under the Nationalist government, the university was incorporated into National Central University, where its engineering programs continued. Its legacy was later inherited by both Hohai University and Southeast University following the nationwide restructuring of Chinese higher education in 1952.

== History ==
- 1915: Hohai Engineering Specialized School (河海工程專門學校) was established in Nanjing as China's first institution dedicated to water conservancy engineering.
- 1921: The Engineering College of National Southeastern University was founded, evolving from the Polytechnic Faculty of National Nanking Higher Normal School. It initially consisted of the departments of civil, mechanical, and electrical engineering.
- Autumn 1924: Hohai Engineering Specialized School merged with the Engineering College of National Southeastern University to form National Hohai Technology University (國立河海工科大學). The renowned engineer Mao Yisheng was appointed as the university's first president.
- 1925: Yang Hsiaoshu, who had served as the university's director of academic affairs, succeeded Mao Yisheng as president.
- June 1927: As part of the Nationalist government's reorganization of higher education, National Hohai Technology University merged with National Southeastern University and several other public institutions in Jiangsu Province to establish a new national university in Nanjing. The institution was initially named National Fourth Zhongshan University, renamed Jiangsu University in February 1928, and became National Central University in May 1928. The university's engineering programs continued as part of the new institution.
- 1949: After the founding of the People's Republic of China, National Central University was renamed National Nanking University.
- 1952: During the nationwide restructuring of Chinese higher education, the Engineering College of Nanking University was reorganized into several specialized institutions. Its engineering disciplines contributed to the development of Nanjing Institute of Technology (renamed Southeast University in 1988) and the East China Technical University of Water Resources (renamed Hohai University in 1985), both of which trace part of their origins to National Hohai Technology University.

== See also ==
- Nanking University
- Southeast University
- Hohai University
