= Liu Xianzhou =

- 刘仙洲
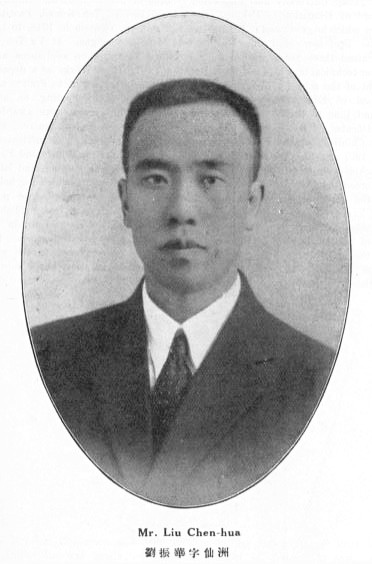
- Born: Liu He; 15 March 1900; Wanxian, Hebei, Qing China
- Died: 3 April 1985 (aged 85); Beijing, China
- Political party: Chinese Communist Party (from 1955)

Academic background
- Education: University of Hong Kong (Bachelor, PhD)

Liu He (simplified Chinese: 刘鹤; traditional Chinese: 劉鶴; 27 January 1890 – October 1975), better known by his courtesy name as Liu Xianzhou (simplified Chinese: 刘仙洲; traditional Chinese: 劉仙洲), was a Chinese educator, mechanical engineer and member of the Chinese Academy of Sciences.

== Biography ==
Liu was born on January 27, 1890, to a farmer's family in Wanxian, Hebei, Qing China. He worked directly with his father in the fields at a very young age. Liu enrolled in an old private school in 1897 and studied until he was 16 (1905). In 1906, he enrolled in middle school. After witnessing the defeat of China in the First Sino-Japanese War, he joined the Tongmenghui, graduated with honors from the middle school in 1912, enrolled in the preparatory course of Peking University in 1913, and was admitted to the Department of Engineering of the University of Hong Kong at public expense in 1914, and graduated with a bachelor's degree from the University of Hong Kong in 1918.

After graduating in 1918, he returned to Hebei to teach at the middle school he had attended until 1921, and in 1924 he became president of Beiyang University. In 1928, he resigned as president of Beiyang University and became a professor at Northeastern University and head of the Department of Engineering. After the Japanese invasion of Manchuria on September 18, 1931, Liu came to teach at Tsinghua University. He continued to teach in Beijing until the Marco Polo Bridge Incident of July 7, 1937, when he followed Tsinghua University's relocation to the Southwest and taught at the National Southwestern Associated University until the end of the war in 1945. He visited the United States in 1946-1947, and upon his return from that visit, he continued to teach at Tsinghua University.

After the founding of the People's Republic of China, he continued to teach at Tsinghua University, and in 1955, Liu joined the Chinese Communist Party. In addition, he served as a deputy in the first, second, third and fourth sessions of the National People's Congress. In 1951, Liu Xianzhou initiated the reconstruction of the Chinese Society of Mechanical Engineering and was elected as an academician of the Chinese Academy of Sciences in 1955.

He was very loyal to the Chinese Communist Party, but he was still dissatisfied with the Great Leap Forward and the Cultural Revolution, and was persecuted during the Cultural Revolution. In 1970, he drafted his own work plan for the next 10 years even though he suffered from a number of serious illnesses, and died in October 1975 of pancreatic cancer in the Third Affiliated Hospital of the Beijing Medical University.

== Legacy ==
Liu is well known for his research into the literature on the development of machinery and machines in ancient China. He also compiled numerous mechanical engineering terminology.
