= Unirule Institute of Economics =

Chinese think tank (1993–2019)

- 天则经济研究所
- Formation: July 1993; 32 years ago
- Dissolved: August 2019; 6 years ago
- Type: Think tank
- Headquarters: 6th Floor, Zhengren Building, No. 9 Chongwai Street, Chongwenmenwai Street, Dongcheng, Beijing
- Location: Beijing, China
- Website: english.unirule.cloud

Chinese name
- Simplified Chinese: 天则经济研究所
- Traditional Chinese: 天則經濟研究所
Transcriptions
Standard Mandarin
- Hanyu Pinyin: Tiānzé Jīngjì yánjiūsuǒ

The Unirule Institute of Economics was a Beijing-based Chinese think tank established in 1993. Unirule conducted research and education in social sciences, primarily in economics, governance, policy, and culture. In August 2019 the institute announced that it would be closing down due to governmental pressure.

Unirule fellows were non-residential research economists, jurists, sociologists, and humanists coming from various research institutes, such as Chinese Academy of Social Sciences, and Development Research Center of State Council, and Zhejiang University.

== History ==
Unirule Institute of Economics was an independent, non-for-profit, nongovernmental think tank, which was founded jointly in July 1993 by Sheng Hong (盛洪), Mao Yushi, Zhang Shuguang (张曙光), Fan Gang, Tang Shouning (唐寿宁), and Beijing Universal Culture Co. Ltd. (北京大象文化有限公司).

In late 1999, the Institute underwent its first organizational restructuring and separated into two divisions. The consulting division was renamed as the Unirule Consulting Firm (UCF) and was fully commercialized from then on, while the organization's academic division remained as the Unirule Institute of Economics (Unirule), a private non-for-profit research institution. The two organizations now keep an "arm's length market relationship," that keeps separate all operations and financial relationships while under the direction of its respective board of directors.

Guangzhou Unirule Research Center was established in July 2012 and located in the capital city Guangzhou. It is dedicated to contribute to the solutions of system innovation of Guangdong Province during the "open-up" process and promote the successful open-up experiences shaped in Guangzhou to other parts of China.

Unirule used to run a Chinese website which focused on wide range of hot topic issues in China and regularly posted Chinese essays. China-review.com was an academic exchange platform of Unirule to promote communication between intellectuals and the public. All of Unirule's websites, social media accounts, as well as the social media accounts of Unirule's leading researchers, were closed down by the City of Beijing's government in late January 2017.

On 10 July 2018, the institute was evicted without notice from their offices in Beijing. Workmen welded the door shut with five staff members inside, although they were released after police arrived. The Aijiaying leasing company from whom the institute leased their offices claimed that the contract was terminated after complaints from other residents in the block, but the institute's director, Sheng Hong, stated that he thought their eviction was carried out on the orders of government authorities. Sheng added that they would try to hire temporary premises for meetings in the future, but in the modern age the institute could survive without a physical presence. As of 2019, the institute operates with a 10-person staff located about 15 miles north of central Beijing.

In August 2019, the institute announced that in response to governmental pressure it would be closing down permanently. The institute said that the Beijing municipal government had issued an order to shut down the institute as it was accused of violating regulations. The institute intends to file a legal challenge to the order, but it is not expected to be successful.
