= Charles Daniel Tenney =

American educator and diplomat to China (1857–1930)

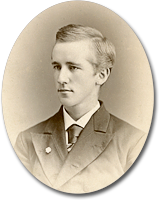
- Born: June 29, 1857; Boston, Massachusetts
- Died: March 14, 1930 (aged 72); Palo Alto, California
- Relatives: Anne Runcie Jerrell (wife)

Charles Daniel Tenney
- Chinese: 丁家立
Transcriptions
Standard Mandarin
- Hanyu Pinyin: Dīng Jiālì

Charles Daniel Tenney (June 29, 1857 – March 14, 1930) was an American educator and diplomat to China. He was the first President of Peiyang University in Tianjin, China from 1895 through 1906 and acted as Secretary of the Tientsin Provisional Government from 1900 to 1902. After ending his service to the Chinese Government, Tenney served as Secretary to the American Legations in Beijing (Peking) and Nanjing (Nanking).

== Early life and education ==
Charles Tenney was born in Boston, Massachusetts on June 29, 1857, to Rev. Daniel Tenney and Mary Adams Parker. After receiving his B.A. and M.A. degrees from Dartmouth College in 1878 and 1879, he entered divinity school at Oberlin Theological Seminary. He was assigned by the American Board of Commissioners for Foreign Missions (ABCFM) to Shanxi, China and moved there with his wife, Anne Runcie Jerrel, as part of the "Oberlin Band" in 1882.

== Life in China ==
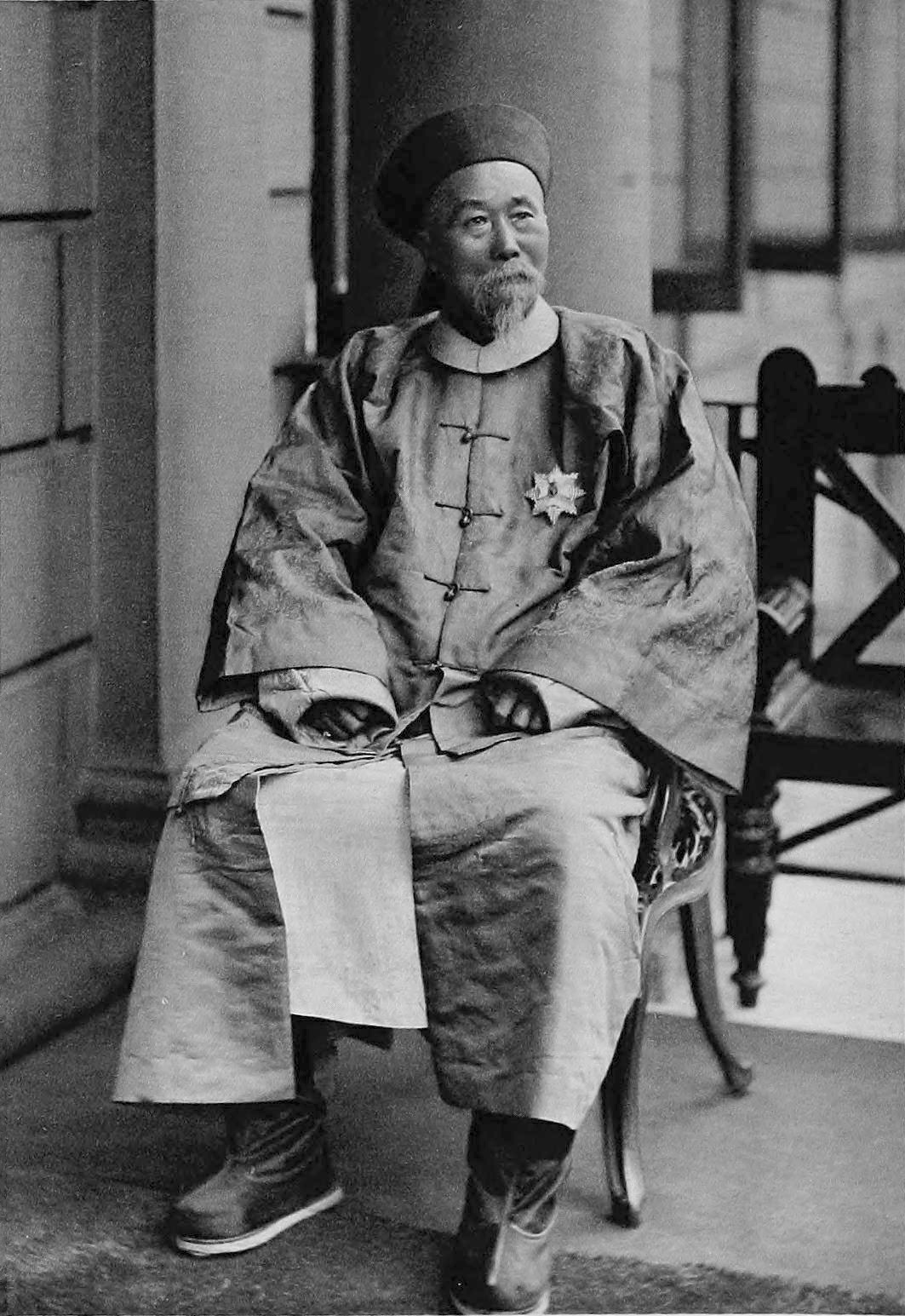
Li Hongzhang in 1896

Tenney lived as a missionary in Shanxi for four years, during which time he founded a primary school. His enthusiasm for converting Chinese to Christians quickly declined, the Oberlin band was riven with dissent, and Tenney's religious views moved toward Unitarianism. Resigning from the ABCFM in 1886, he moved to Tianjin, Hebei province where he became tutor to the sons of influential statesman and reformer Li Hongzhang. Tenney founded the Tianjin Anglo-Chinese College and acted as principal of that institution beginning in 1886. When the Chinese Government opened the Imperial Chinese University in Tianjin in 1895 it selected Tenney as president, and he served in this role until 1906. He was then appointed as Director of Chinese Government Students in the United States.

== Life as an American diplomat ==
Tenney became the Chinese Secretary of the American Legation at Beijing in 1908 and American Delegate to the Joint International Opium Commission at Shanghai in 1909. Following the founding of the Revolutionary Government by Sun Yat-sen in 1912, Tenney was sent to the newly appointed capital at Nanjing as Consul. He was promoted to Counselor of Legation in 1919 and was acting head of affairs for the American Embassy until 1920.

== Death ==
Tenney retired in 1921 and returned to the United States, making his home in Palo Alto, California. He made a return trip to China in 1923 where he suffered from a stroke. He died in Palo Alto in 1930.

== Works ==
- Tenney, C. D. (1904). Geography of Asia. New York: MacMillan and Co. OCLC 182639088.
