= Boyu Capital =

Chinese private equity firm

- Native name: 博裕資本
- Company type: Private
- Industry: Private equity
- Founded: September 21, 2010; 15 years ago
- Founders: Alvin Jiang; Mary Ma; Sean Tong; Louis Cheung
- Headquarters: Two Pacific Place, Admiralty, Hong Kong
- Key people: Louis Cheung (CEO)
- AUM: US$40 billion (2022)
- Website: www.boyucapital.com

Boyu Capital (Boyu; Chinese: 博裕資本; pinyin: Bóyù Zīběn) is a Chinese private equity firm headquartered in Hong Kong with additional offices in Beijing, Shanghai and Singapore.

The firm has gained a reputation as a Princeling-affiliated firm as one of its co-founders, Alvin Jiang, is grandson of Jiang Zemin, the paramount leader of China from 1993 to 2003. It is believed that Jiang's family connections has helped the firm to be involved in numerous high-profile deals such as the initial public offerings (IPO) of Alibaba Group, China Cinda Asset Management and Ant Group. In only a decade, the firm became one of China's most successful investors.

== Background ==
Boyu Capital was founded in 2010 by Alvin Jiang, the grandson of former general secretary of the Chinese Communist Party Jiang Zemin, when he was 24 years old.

In 2011, Mary Ma, the former chief financial officer at Lenovo, left her role at TPG Inc. to join Boyu. She was joined by Louis Cheung, a former executive director at Ping An Insurance credited with its turnaround in 2000, and Sean Tong, a private equity veteran who had worked at Providence Equity and General Atlantic. Li Ka-shing was one of the earliest investors, and through the Li Ka Shing Foundation, helped Boyu raise $1 billion for its first fund. Other investors include GIC, Temasek Holdings and the New York State Common Retirement Fund.

Between 2011 and 2021, Boyu raised five US dollar funds with its fifth one raising $6.8 billion in 2021. At the time, it was the largest US dollar fund in China controlled by an independent manager according to AVCJ. During the same period, Boyu also raised three RMB funds and was raising a fourth one.

It is believed Boyu was able to be involved in numerous high-profile deals due to Jiang's family connections. However, there hasn't been any direct evidence that his grandfather himself had a role in helping Boyu win any notable deals.

In recent years, Boyu was adversely affected by changes of the market environment in China due to policies such as common prosperity and the 2020–2021 Xi Jinping Administration reform spree in China.

In 2021, it was reported that Tong and Cheung had relocated to Singapore to run the office there. The transition of operations to Singapore which began in late 2019 is said to be partially political as efforts were made by Chinese leader Xi Jinping to curb the influence over retired Communist Party elders as well as tighten control over Hong Kong using the Hong Kong national security law due to the 2019–2020 Hong Kong protests. Singapore offered Boyu greater distance from potential adverse actions by authorities in Beijing. In addition, part of Boyu's Hong Kong operations were transferred to Shanghai which is where Jiang is based.

== Notable deals ==
In mid-2011, Boyu paid $80 million for a 40% stake in Sunrise Duty Free, a company that runs all duty-free stores at Shanghai and Beijing's international airports. At the time Sunrise was valued at $200 million and by early 2013, bankers valued it at $1.6 billion. This deal helped established Boyu's presence and showed investors that Jiang could gain access to a strictly controlled state sector and convert its assets into highly profitable investments.

In 2012, Alibaba founder, Jack Ma personally met with Jiang to negotiate a deal. Boyu had joined a consortium led by China Investment Corporation to raise $7.1 billion for Ma to buy back a 20% stake of Alibaba from Yahoo!. The consortium received 5.6% stake in Alibaba for its services. When Alibaba helds its IPO on 19 September 2014, Boyu profited.

In 2012, Boyu invested $50 million in China Cinda Asset Management allowing the firm to profit when Cinda held its IPO in December 2013.

In 2016, Boyu was one of the earliest investors of Ant Group. According to The Wall Street Journal, Boyu set up a subsidiary in Shanghai named Boyu Taoran (Shanghai) which then invested in Shanghai Tiancen Investment Management. That firm then invested in a private equity firm called Beijing Jingguan Investment Center, which in turn bought shares in Ant. Beijing Jingguan was listed as one of 16 investors that provided a total of 29.1 billion yuan ($4.5 billion) to Ant in 2016. In 2018, it joined another group of funds that invested 21.8 billion yuan in Ant. As a result of these two investments, Beijing Jingguan held nearly 1% stake in Ant and was a top 10 shareholder according to Ant's IPO prospectus. The prospectus made no mention of Boyu's involvement with Beijing Jingguan. However, in October 2020, Ant's IPO was scuttled with reports Xi Jinping was personally involved. Jiang's family ties were blamed as one of the reasons the IPO was halted.

In September 2022, Boyu joined Temasek and GGV Capital in raising $110 million for Animoca Brands.

In November 2025, Starbucks announced it would sell a majority stake of its China operations to Boyu. It was also announced as part of Starbuck's turnaround strategy that after the deal closes in the second quarter of fiscal 2026, pending regulatory approval, Boyu will hold up to a 60% interest in the joint venture.
