= Zhang Shicheng (professor) =

Zhang Shicheng (born November 1963) is a professor of oil production engineering, vice president of China University of Petroleum (Beijing) (since September 2008), and the principal of Karamay Campus (since March 2016).

Zhang was born and raised in Shucheng County, Anhui. Zhang accomplished his bachelor's degree in oil production engineering from Huadong Petroleum Institute (renamed the University of Petroleum in 1988 and China University of Petroleum) in 1982. Then he took a Master's degree in China University of Petroleum (Beijing) from 1986 to 1989.

Zhang worked as a lecturer after he accomplished the master's degree in China University of Petroleum – Beijing. He became an administration in the university since 2004, as the director of the Office of Educational Administration. In September 2008, he was anominated as the Vice President in Beijing campus and at the same time he took charge of President Office, Office of Educational Administration, Infrastructure Department in Beijing campus. Since the university was extended in Karamay, Xinjiang in October 2015, he was anominated as the Principal in Karamay campus in March 2016.
