= Liu Chuanzhi =

Chinese businessman and entrepreneur (born 1944)

- 柳传志
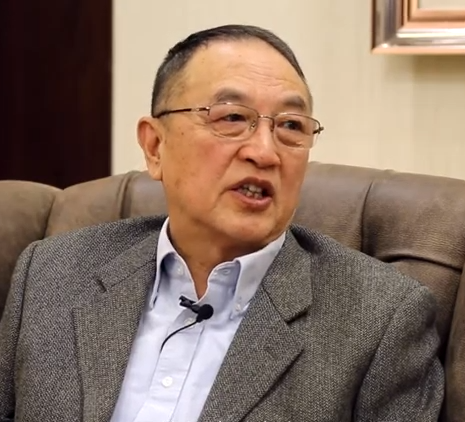
- Born: 29 April 1944 (age 82); Zhenjiang, Jiangsu, Japanese-occupied China
- Education: Xidian University
- Known for: Founding and leading Lenovo
- Spouse: Gong Guoxing (龚国兴)
- Children: 2
- Relatives: Liu Qing (柳青) (daughter)

Liu Chuanzhi (simplified Chinese: 柳传志; traditional Chinese: 柳傳志; pinyin: Liǔ Chuánzhì; born 29 April 1944) is a Chinese entrepreneur. Liu is the founder of Lenovo, the world's largest personal computer vendor by unit sales. He remains one of the leaders of the company.

== Early life and education ==
After graduating from high school in 1962, Liu applied to be a military pilot and passed all the associated exams. Despite his father's revolutionary credentials, Liu was declared unfit for military service because a relative had been denounced as a rightist. In autumn of the same year, Liu entered the People's Liberation Army Institute of Telecommunication Engineering, now known as Xidian University. Due to his political and class background, Liu was deemed unsuitable for such sensitive subjects and was assigned to study radar. During his studies Liu received an introduction to computing.

Liu was labeled an "intellectual element" during the Cultural Revolution. In 1966, he told his classmates that the revolution was a terrible idea and was sent to a state-owned rice farm near Macau in Guangdong as a result. From there he was sent to a farm in Hunan dedicated to reform through hard labor. Liu returned to Beijing where he took up a post in 1970 as an engineer-administrator at the Computer Institute that had earlier developed the Number 104, Number 109, and Number 111 mainframe computers. Liu worked on the development of the Number 757 mainframe computer. In 1984, he resigned to become a cadre in the personnel office of the Chinese Academy of Sciences. He remained there until he co-founded Legend in 1984.

== Business activities ==
=== Lenovo ===
By the early 1980s, Liu had achieved relative success as a computer scientist but still felt frustrated with his career. While his work on magnetic data storage was important, it lacked direct practical applications. He said, "We were the top computer technology research organization in China. We developed the first electron-tube computer and the first transistor computer. But we only produced one of each. Then we went on to develop something different. The work was just filed away." Liu was also anxious about his economic circumstances; in 1984, Liu had a growing family but an income of only 100RMB per month.

Liu founded Lenovo (originally called Legend), in 1984 with a group of ten other engineers in Beijing with 200,000 yuan and an office roughly 20 square yards in size. Liu came up with the idea to start Lenovo in response to a lack of funding at the Chinese Academy of Sciences (CAS). Liu's superior arranged for the academy to loan him and the other co-founders the afore-mentioned 200,000 yuan. Of this time, Liu said, "It wasn't easy. The lowest thing you could do in the early '80s, as a scientist, was to go into business. China had a strict planned economy and there was barely room for a freewheeling company like ours."

Liu emphasized developing an effective working relationship with his superiors at the CAS from the very start. Despite its rhetoric of market-oriented reform, the Chinese government was reluctant to relax state control of the economy. Liu feared that his company might fail due to government micro-management. Liu also worried about dealing with local government officials and party cadres. He said, "We were totally immersed in the environment of a planned economy. I didn't care that the investment was small, but I knew I must have control over finances, human resources and decision-making." Liu's superiors immediately granted his request for autonomy.

Lenovo's founders, all scientists and engineers, faced difficulty from their lack of familiarity with market-oriented business practices, traditional Chinese ambivalence towards commerce, and anti-capitalist communist ideology. During this period many Chinese intellectuals felt that commerce was immoral and degrading. The fact that in the 1980s entrepreneurs were drawn from lower classes, and often dishonest as well, made the private sector even more unattractive. This was readily apparent to Liu and his collaborators due to their proximity to Zhongguancun, where the proliferation of fly-by-night electronics traders lead to the area being dubbed "Swindlers Valley."

Their first significant transaction, an attempt to import televisions, failed. The group rebuilt itself within a year by conducting quality checks on computers for new buyers. Lenovo soon invested money in developing a circuit board that would allow IBM PCs to process Chinese characters. This product was Lenovo's first major success. In 1990, Lenovo started to assemble and sell computers under its original brand name, Legend.

Lenovo also tried and failed to market a digital watch. Liu said, "Our management team often differed on which commercial road to travel. This led to big discussions, especially between the engineering chief and myself. He felt that if the quality of the product was good, then it would sell itself. But I knew this was not true, that marketing and other factors were part of the eventual success of a product." Lenovo's early difficulties were compounded by the fact that its staff had little business experience. "We were mainly scientists and didn't understand the market," Liu said. "We just learned by trial-and-error, which was very interesting—but also very dangerous," said Liu.

Liu received government permission to open a subsidiary in Hong Kong and was allowed to move there along with five other employees. Liu's father, already in Hong Kong, supported his son's ambitions through mentoring and facilitating loans. Liu moved to Hong Kong in 1988. In order to save money during this period, Liu and his co-workers walked instead of taking public transportation. In order to keep up appearances they rented hotel rooms for meetings.

Lenovo became a publicly traded company after listing in Hong Kong in 1994, raising nearly US$30 million. Prior to Lenovo's IPO, many analysts were optimistic. The company was praised for its good management, strong brand recognition, and growth potential. Analysts also worried about Lenovo's profitability. Lenovo's IPO was massively over-subscribed. During the first day of trading the company's stock price hit a high of HK$2.07 and closed at HK$2.00. Proceeds from the offering were used to finance sales offices in Europe, North America, and Australia; expand and improve production and research and development; and increase working capital. Lenovo's Hong Kong and Mainland China business units conducted a merger and secondary offering in 1997.

When Lenovo was first listed, its managers thought the only purpose of going public was to raise capital. They had little understanding of the rules and responsibilities that went along with running a public company. Before Lenovo conducted its first secondary offering in 1997, Liu proudly announced the company's intent to mainland newspapers only to have its stock halted for two days by regulators to punish his statement. This occurred several times until Liu learned that he had to choose his words carefully in public. The first time Liu traveled to Europe on a "roadshow" to discuss his company's stock he was shocked by the skeptical questions he was subjected to and felt offended. Liu later came to understand that he was accountable to shareholders. He said, "Before I only had one boss, but CAS never asked me anything. I relied on my own initiative to do things. We began to think about issues of credibility. Legend began to learn how to become a truly international company."

Liu claims Hewlett-Packard as a key source of inspiration for Lenovo. In an interview with The Economist he said, "Our earliest and best teacher was Hewlett-Packard." For more than ten years, Lenovo served as Hewlett-Packard's distributor in China. Speaking about Lenovo's later acquisition of IBM's personal computer unit Liu said, "I remember the first time I took part in a meeting of IBM agents. I was wearing an old business suit of my father's and I sat in the back row. Even in my dreams, I never imagined that one day we could buy the IBM PC business. It was unthinkable. Impossible."

Lenovo's later takeover of IBM's personal computing business made him the first Chinese CEO to lead the takeover of a major American firm. During an interview, Liu acknowledged the major risks involved with the IBM deal. "We had three serious risks. Number one: After the acquisition, would clients buy from the new owner? Number two: Would employees continue to work for the new owner? Number three: Would there be potential conflicts between the Chinese management and the Western management?"

Business ethics were a key challenge for Liu in establishing and expanding Lenovo. Liu says that at first he behaved "like a kind of dictator" and spent much time yelling. He had five corrupt executives imprisoned. Being late for a meeting could be punished by having to stand in silence before the group, a punishment that Liu accepted three times himself. Lenovo's culture gradually changed and Liu was able to relax his authoritarian style. Lenovo became an employer of choice for Chinese engineers and managers with overseas education.

=== Legend Holdings ===
In June 2012, Liu stepped down as chairman of Legend Holdings, the parent company of Lenovo. In the years just prior to his resignation, Liu focused on improving Legend's growth, building-up its core assets, and conducting a public stock offering between 2014 and 2016. Legend's major assets include Lenovo, Legend Capital, a real-estate venture called Raycom, Digital China, and Hony Capital.

In an interview with the BBC, Liu said that his vision for Legend was for it "to become an industry in its own right" and that he wants it "to become the top enterprise across industries...not only in China, but in the whole world." Liu said that he realized that his vision was extremely ambitious and may have to be left to his successors to implement.

Liu said in an interview with Forbes that he hoped to diversify away from IT-related businesses and that Legend Holding's assets would be mainly concentrated in information technology, real estate, services, coal processing, and agriculture. He said agriculture "will become the next strategic development area for Legend Holdings." Liu said agriculture is just one part of what he sees as "huge" opportunities in sectors that cater to Chinese consumers. In the same interview, Liu said that Legend's focus would continue to remain on China. "Whatever we do has to fit into something we are doing in China," said Liu when referring to plans for overseas investment. Liu said in July 2012 that he plans to take Legend Holdings public with a listing in Hong Kong. Forbes speculated that Liu may be trying to "create a Chinese version of General Electric."

Liu led an initial public offering for Legend on the Hong Kong Stock Exchange in 2015. The offering received regulatory approval in June of that year. Liu said in an interview that he planned to float Legend's stock on a domestic Chinese exchange before his retirement.

In 2019, Liu resigned as chairman of Legend Holdings.

=== Joyvio ===
Joyvio is Legend Holdings' vehicle for investment in the food industry. Legend has invested more than 1 billion yuan in Joyvio. Joyvio will pursue complete vertical integration from farming all the way to retailing. Joyvio's first product was blueberries. In November 2013, its product range was expanded to kiwifruit. The kiwifruit has been named "Liu Kiwi," in honor of Liu Chuanzhi. Liu is responsible for Legend's move into food.

=== Other positions ===
As of 2013, Liu served as a senior advisor at Kohlberg Kravis Roberts & Company.

== Political views ==
Unlike many other Chinese business leaders, Liu has often spoken out on political issues. Liu has criticized others' tendency for silence. He said, "when it comes to the inappropriate actions the government takes, businessmen don't have the courage or capacity to go against them; second, they lack the social responsibility to care for the whole world and what they do is to 'mind their own business.'"

During an interview with Caijing in October 2012, he advocated for what he called "elite selection" of political leaders. He said, "I'm not sure how practical it would be to have universal voting in the near future. I hope the country's leaders could be elected by the elites of the society." Liu is also deeply concerned with the rule of law. He said, "My biggest worry is an unlawful world. I tell my employees to be careful all the time; don't disrespect the government or bribe anyone - even so, I'm still not at peace because there are always some corrupt individuals coming along to cause problems."

== Public service ==
Liu served as a delegate to the 16th National Congress of Chinese Communist Party and a deputy to the 9th and 10th sessions of the National People's Congress.

In 2001, Liu was selected by Time magazine as one of the "25 Most Influential Global Executives."

== Personal life ==
Liu was born in 1944 and his paternal grandfather was head of a traditional Chinese bank. Liu's grandfather sent his father, Liu Gushu (柳谷书), to study in Shanghai. Liu Gushu abandoned scholarship and passed an exam for employment with the Bank of China. Liu Gushu was a "patriotic capitalist" who worked secretly for the Communist Party before the revolution of 1949. He became a senior executive with the Bank of China and later became a patent lawyer and chairman of the China Technology Licensing Company. Liu Chuanzhi's maternal grandfather served as finance minister for the warlord Sun Chuanfang. After the Communist victory in 1949, Liu's family moved to Beijing, where they lived in a traditional courtyard home located on a hutong in the Wangfujing area. Liu's father continued his work with the Bank of China and joined the Chinese Communist Party.

Liu is married and has three children, including Liu Qing (柳青), president of Didi Chuxing.

== See also ==
- Mary Ma, former CFO of Lenovo
