= Shan Honghong =

Professor from China

Shan Honghong (born September 1959) is a professor and the Secretary of the Party Committee of China University of Petroleum (Beijing).

Born and raised in Zhengzhou, Henan, Shan graduated from Huadong Petroleum Institute (renamed the University of Petroleum in 1988 and China University of Petroleum (East China)) in 1982).

Working experience

- January 1982 – August 1984, associate lecturer, Huadong Petroleum Institute
- September 1984 – July 1987, master in petroleum refining engineering, Huadong Petroleum Institute
- August 1987 – 1991, lecturer, Huadong Petroleum Institute
- 1991–1996, vice professor, University of Petroleum
- 1997 – March 2000, professor, University of Petroleum
- April 2000 – January 2004, dean of Department of Chemical Engineering, University of Petroleum
- February 2004 – June 2005, vice president, University of Petroleum
- July 2005 – December 2016, president, China University of Petroleum (East China)
- January 2017, Secretary of the Party Committee, China University of Petroleum (Beijing)
