= Nie Zaiping =

Nie Zaiping (Chinese: 聂在平) from the University of Electronic Science and Technology of China (UESTC), Chengdu, Sichuan, China is a Chinese engineer. He was named Fellow of the Institute of Electrical and Electronics Engineers (IEEE) for the IEEE Antennas & Propagation Society in 2013 for leadership in engineering and education in electromagnetics.
