= Ning Cai =

Ning Cai may refer to:

- Ning Cai (magician) (born 1982), Singaporean magician, mentalist, and writer
- Ning Cai (engineer) (born 1947), Chinese electrical engineer
