= Mary Ma =

Chinese businesswoman and investor (died 2019)

- Born: Ma Xuezheng; 1952 or 1953
- Died: 31 August 2019 (aged 66)
- Education: Capital Normal University, University of London
- Occupations: Businesswoman, investor
- Known for: Orchestrating Lenovo's acquisition of IBM's PC division
- Title: CFO of Lenovo (2000-2007)

Chinese name
- Traditional Chinese: 馬雪征
- Simplified Chinese: 马雪征
Transcriptions
Standard Mandarin
- Hanyu Pinyin: Mǎ Xuězhēng
- Wade–Giles: Ma^{3} Hsüeh^{3}-chêng^{1}
- IPA: [mà ɕɥè.ʈʂə́ŋ]

Mary Ma or Ma Xuezheng (Chinese: 马雪征; 1952 or 1953 – 31 August 2019) was a Chinese businesswoman and investor. She served as chief financial officer of the computer maker Lenovo, and played a key role in the company's acquisition of IBM's personal computer division in 2005. She was named by Forbes as the world's 57th most powerful woman in that year. After retiring from Lenovo in 2007, she worked in private equity and co-founded Boyu Capital, which invested in companies including Alibaba Group and Megvii.

== Early life and career ==
Ma Xuezheng was born in 1952 or 1953. She graduated from Capital Normal University in 1976, one of the few college graduates during the Cultural Revolution. She later studied at the University of London in England.

After returning to China, she worked for 12 years at the Chinese Academy of Sciences, and served as an interpreter for Chinese national leaders, including Deng Xiaoping and Hu Yaobang.

== Lenovo ==
In 1988, Ma met Liu Chuanzhi, the founder and CEO of the computer company Legend (now Lenovo), for the first time, and was impressed by his vision and management style. Two years later, she quit her government job to join Legend as the assistant general manager of its Hong Kong branch.

By 1997, Ma had risen to the position of deputy general manager of Legend Holdings. In that year, Ma proposed to implement employee stock ownership for Legend, which was unprecedented for a Chinese company. Liu accepted her proposal and further broadened it to cover all employees of Legend, which numbered several thousand at the time. Legend's employee ownership has been credited with helping the company weather the major downturn of the dotcom crash in 2000, and Ma was promoted to chief financial officer.

In 2005, Ma orchestrated Lenovo's acquisition of IBM's personal computer division, including ThinkPad and ThinkCentre. The US$1.75 billion deal quadrupled Lenovo's size overnight and turned the largely domestically oriented company into the world's third-largest computer maker. In that year, Forbes named her as one of the world's 100 most powerful women at number 57. Lenovo has since grown into the world's largest PC maker in 2019, with a quarter of the global market share.

In 2006, Ma was involved in negotiating Lenovo's sponsorship deal for the 2006 Winter Olympics in Turin; it was the first time a Chinese company had sponsored a major global sports event.

== Boyu Capital and later life ==
Ma retired from Lenovo in 2007, but continued to serve as a non-executive director. She joined the private equity company TPG, and later co-founded her own investment firm Boyu Capital (博裕资本) in 2011. Boyu raised close to US$10 billion, and invested in major companies and startups including Alibaba Group, NetEase Music, LY.com, Easyhome, and Megvii.

In March 2019, Ma was appointed an independent director of the board of Hong Kong Exchanges and Clearing, which operates the Hong Kong Stock Exchange. She was also a non-executive director of Unilever and Swire Pacific.

On 31 August 2019, Ma died from pancreatic cancer at the age of 66.
