= Xiaodong Chen =

Xiaodong Chen may refer to:

- Xiaodong Chen (electrical engineer)
- Xiaodong Chen (materials scientist)

== See also ==
- Chen Xiaodong (disambiguation)
