= Zhiwu Li =

Chinese electrical engineer

Zhiwu Li is an electrical engineer at Xidian University in Xi'an, China. He was named a Fellow of the Institute of Electrical and Electronics Engineers (IEEE) in 2016 for his contributions to Petri nets and their applications to automated manufacturing systems.

Li received a Ph.D. from Xidian University in Mechanical Engineering in 1995.
