= Jenny Lee (venture capitalist) =

Singaporean venture capitalist

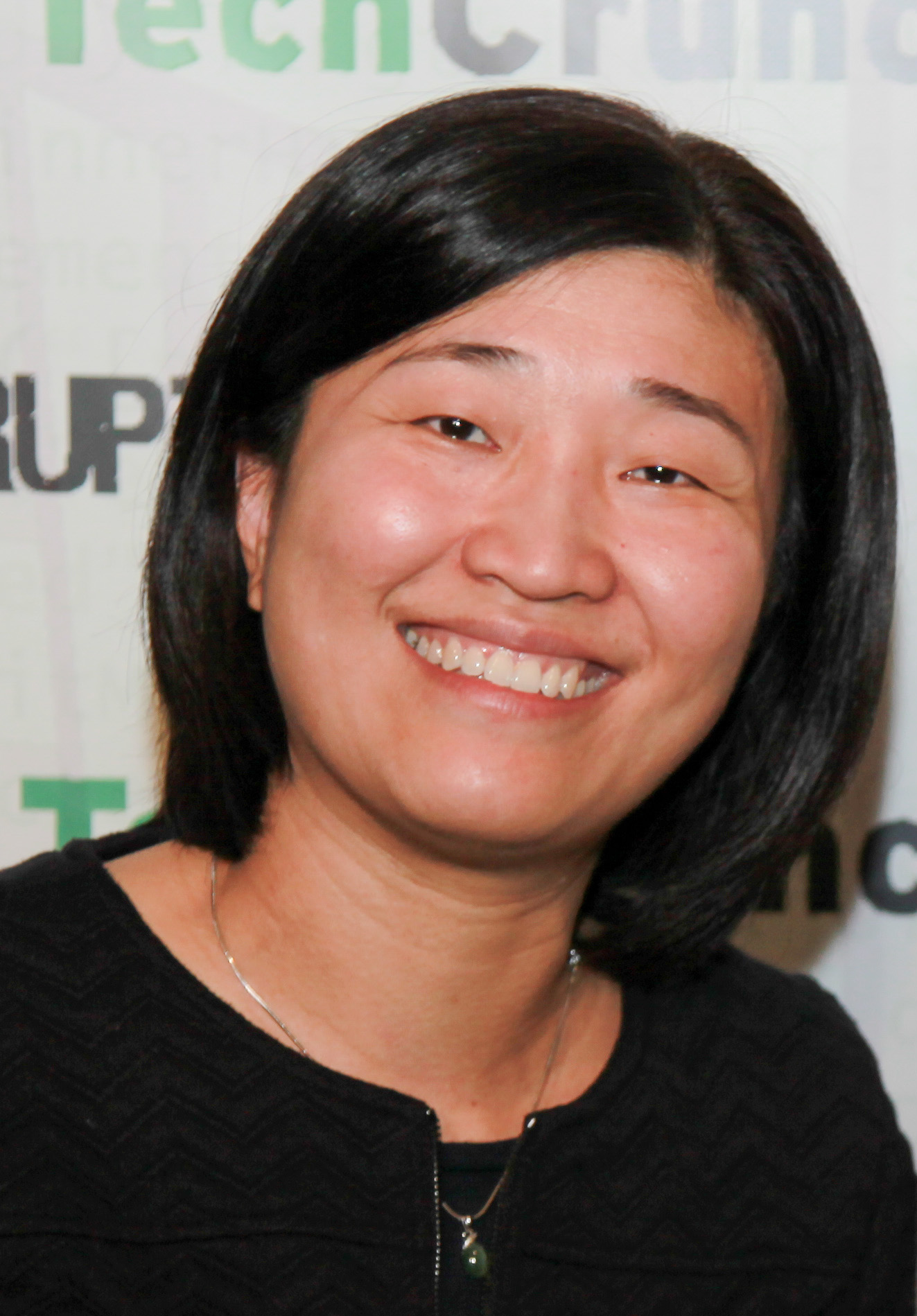
- Lee at TechCrunch Disrupt in 2017
- Born: 1972 (age 53–54); Singapore
- Education: Cornell University Kellogg School of Management
- Occupation: Venture capitalist
- Known for: Senior Managing Partner of Granite Asia
- Spouse: Vincent Koh

Jenny Lee (born 1972) is a Singaporean venture capitalist and Senior Managing Partner of Granite Asia based in Singapore. Lee was the first woman venture capitalist to break into the top 10 of Forbes Midas List in 2015.

In 2019, she ranked #86 on Forbes World's 100 Most Powerful Women list, and in 2021, ranked #33 on The Midas List. She also appeared on the Midas List in 2024.

== Early life and education ==
Lee was a student of CHIJ Saint Nicholas Girls' School and Hwa Chong Junior College. A ST Engineering scholar, she studied engineering at Cornell University in New York from 1991 to 1995 and graduated with a Bachelor of Arts and Science and a Master of Science. Upon her return, she joined ST Aerospace as a jet engineer.

In 2001, she obtained a Master of Business Administration from the Kellogg School of Management in Chicago.

== Career ==
In 2001, Lee returned to Singapore.

She found a job with Morgan Stanley in Hong Kong. A year later, she joined Japanese venture-capital firm, JAFCO Asia.

Lee joined GGV Capital as a managing partner in 2005 and was involved in setting up its first China office. While working with GGV, the firm invested in startups such as Alibaba, Didi Chuxing, Xiaomi, Toutiao, and Grab.

In March 2024, Lee and Jixun Foo led the newly formed firm, Granite Asia, after it was split off from GGV Capital.

== Personal life ==
Lee was born in Singapore to a Chinese schoolteacher father and a housewife mother. She is married to Vincent Koh.
