= Zhang Laibin =

Chinese academic

Zhang Laibin (张来斌; born 1961) is a professor and the president of China University of Petroleum (Beijing) (since June 2005).

Born and raised in Tongling, Anhui. Zhang obtained his doctorate of Mechanical engineering from China University of Petroleum (Beijing) in 1991.

Zhang is a professor and also be accountable for the administrative work in Personnel Division, Office of International Exchange and Cooperation and the Supervisory Audit Office in Beijing campus.

Zhang became a member of the standing committee of the 11th and 12th session of Chinese People's Political Consultative Conference in 2008 and 2012 respectively. He is also the member of the standing committee of the Central Committee of China Democratic League.

His administration career started as the Vice Dean of the Department of Mechatronics in China University of Petroleum - Beijing in the period between 1992 and 1994. After that he became the Dean for the same department from 1994 to February 1998. In March 1998, he was nominated as the Deputy Secretary of the Party Committee in the university. After one year, he was nominated as the Vice President and worked until May 2005.
