= Liu Qing (businesswoman) =

Chinese business executive (born 1978)

Jean Liu
- 柳青
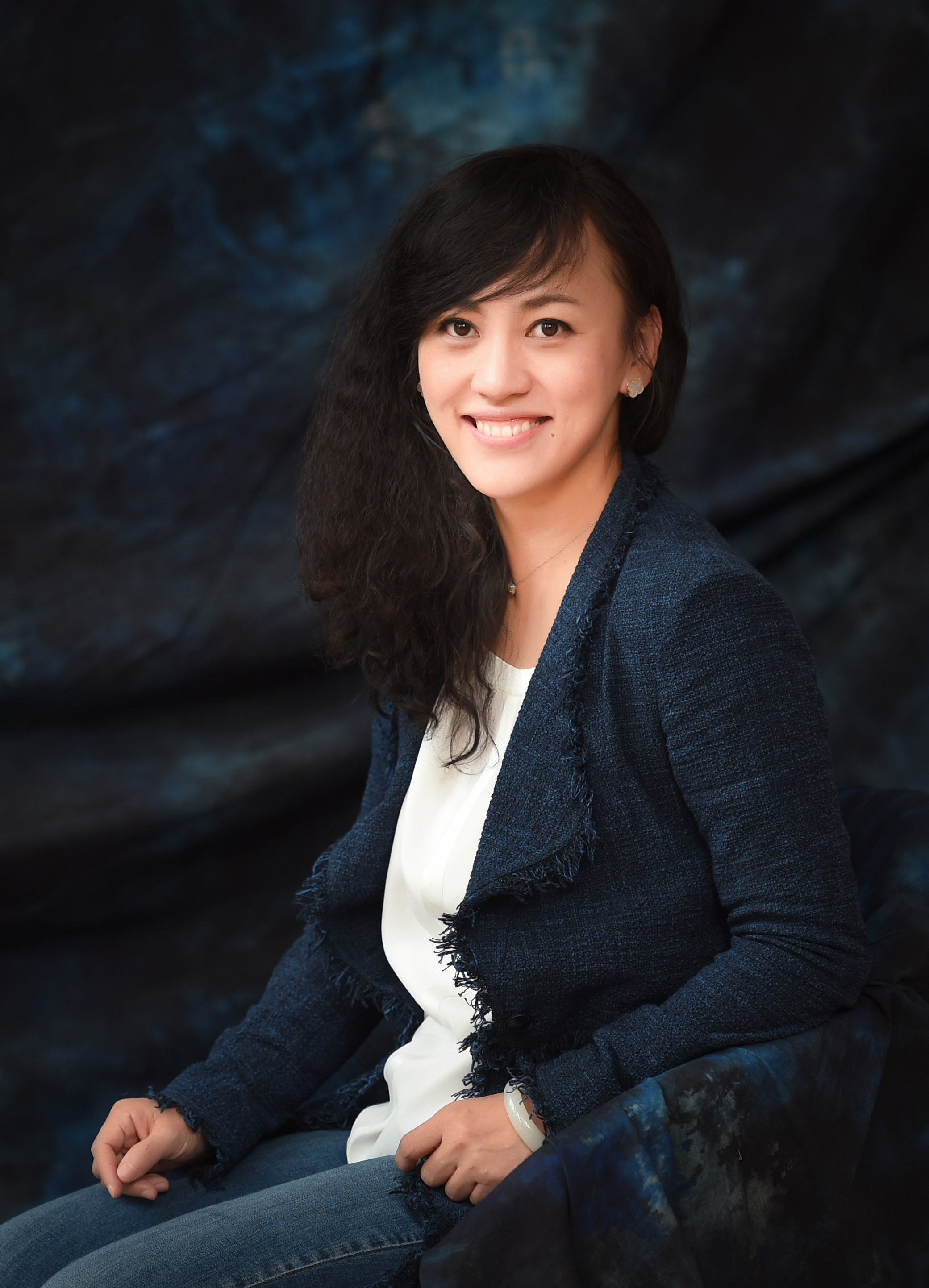
- Liu in 2016
- Born: Liu Qing; 1978 (age 47–48); Beijing, China
- Education: Peking University (BS); Harvard University (MS)
- Occupation: Business Executive
- Known for: President of Didi Chuxing
- Relatives: Liu Chuanzhi (father)

Liu Qing (Chinese: 柳青; pinyin: Liǔ Qīng, born 1978 in Beijing) or Jean Liu, is a Chinese business executive. She is the President of DiDi, a Chinese mobile transportation platform. She worked at Goldman Sachs Asia for 12 years before joining to DiDi as chief operating officer in July 2014.

After joining Didi Dache, she led the strategic merger between Didi Dache and its main competitor Kuaidi Dache which then created the car hailing company named Didi Kuaidi (later rebranded as Didi Chuxing) in 2015.

In 2017, Liu was included on the annual Time 100 list of the most influential people in the world. She forced Uber out of the Chinese market when she, and Cheng Wei, got Uber to sell its China operation.

== Early life and education ==
Liu was born in 1978 in Beijing. She is the daughter of Chinese businessman and Lenovo founder Liu Chuanzhi, and the granddaughter of Liu Gushu, a senior executive banker at the Bank of China.

She received a bachelor's degree in Computer Science at Peking University, and a master's degree in Computer Science at Harvard University. She received an honorary Doctor of Commercial Science from New York University.

== Personal life ==
Liu is the daughter of Lenovo founder Liu Chuanzhi.

In October 2015, Liu announced that she was being treated for breast cancer at the age of 37. In early December 2015, she posted on her Weibo that she would return to work by the end of December after a two-month treatment.

Liu currently lives in Beijing. She is married and has three children.
