= Xidian University =

Public university in Xi'an, Shaanxi, China

- 西安电子科技大学
- Former name: Northwest Institute of Telecommunication Engineering
- Motto: 厚德 求真 砺学 笃行
- Type: Public
- Established: 1931; 95 years ago
- Affiliations: Ministry of Education of the People's Republic of China
- President: Xinbo Gao (高新波)
- Faculty: 2,700
- Undergraduates: 22,487
- Postgraduates: 15,399
- Location: Xi'an, Shaanxi, China; North Campus 34°13′47.3″N 108°54′57″E; South Campus 34°07′24.2″N 108°50′9.2″E
- Campus: Urban, 667 acres (2.70 km^{2})
- Website: xidian.edu.cn en.xidian.edu.cn

Chinese name
- Simplified Chinese: 西安电子科技大学
- Traditional Chinese: 西安電子科技大學
Transcriptions
Standard Mandarin
- Hanyu Pinyin: Xī'ān diànzǐ kējì dàxué

Xidian University (Chinese: 西安电子科技大学; lit. 'Xi'an Electronic Science and Technology University') is a public university in Xi'an, Shaanxi, China. It is affiliated with the Ministry of Education, and co-funded by the Ministry of Education, the Ministry of Industry and Information Technology, SASTIND, and China Electronics Technology Group Corporation. The university is part of the Double First-Class Construction and Project 211.

Xidian University focuses on electronics and information education and research, and has programs covering engineering, computer science, management, economics, liberal arts and social sciences.

== Academics ==
Xidian University is one of China's National Key Universities managed by the Ministry of Education of the People's Republic of China. Xidian University is organized into 17 schools. The university has undergraduate programs covering engineering, science, management and economics. It also offers Master's and PhD degrees. The university has over 31,000 students, including 21,650 undergraduate students, 9,293 master's students, and 1,779 doctoral students. 7 National Key Disciplines have been affiliated with Xidian University.

=== Academic standing ===
Xidian is one of the universities which have "National Advantage Discipline Innovation Platform", one of the 211 Project universities, one of the Double First-rate universities, one of the 56 universities having a Graduate School, one of the 35 universities having a national demonstration School of Software. It is a base of IT talents training and high level scientific research innovation.

The university consists of 18 schools. There are 4 state key laboratories, 5 key laboratories of the Ministry of Education, 17 provincial key laboratories and 15 university research institutes and centers. At present, Xidian University has 7 national key disciplines, 40 doctoral programs, 77 masters programs and 50 bachelor's programs: In the fields of communication networks, signal and information processing, information security, microelectronics and mechatronics, Xidian University possesses distinctive advantages and features in cultivation and scientific research at home and abroad. In the national assessment of the first-level disciplines in China in 2012, its "information and communication engineering" ranked second and its "electronic science and technology" ranked fourth.

=== Rankings ===
University rankings
BCUR National	Domestic	40
Wu Shulian National	Domestic	48
CUAA National	Alumni	43
THE National	General	38–51
QS Asia (Asia version)	General	551–600
THE Asia (Asia version)	General	=141
ARWU World	Research	401–500
THE World	General	601–800
USNWR World	General	=643

In 2020, Academic Ranking of World Universities (ARWU) ranked Xidian University top 401–500 in the world.

- Global Ranking of Academic Subjects by Academic Ranking of World Universities (ARWU) 2021

Global ranking of academic subjects by Academic Ranking of World Universities (ARWU) 2021
Subjects	Global rankings
Telecommunication Engineering	1
Computer Science & Engineering	28
Electrical & Electronic Engineering	36

- National and Global Subject Ranking of Xidian University by U.S. News & World Report 2020

Subject rankings by U.S. News & World Report 2020
Subjects	National rankings	Global rankings
Computer Science	8	22
Electrical and Electronic Engineering	11	23
Engineering	34	175

=== School of Telecommunications Engineering ===
The school is dedicated to education and research in the areas of Communications Engineering, Information Systems Security, Wireless Broadband and Signal and Information Processing. There are more than 3,800 undergraduates, 2,000 master's students and 300 doctoral students.

Departments

- Communications Engineering
- Information Engineering
- National Experimental Teaching Demonstration Center of Communication and Information Engineering

=== School of Electronic Engineering ===
The school has 311 faculty members, including one Member of Chinese Academy of Sciences, two National Famous Teachers of China and three National Experts with Outstanding Contribution.

Three National Key Disciplines:

- Signal and Information Processing
- Circuits and Systems
- Electromagnetic Field and Microwave Technology

Departments

- Electronic Engineering
- Electronic and Information Engineering
- Information Countermeasures
- Intelligent Science and Technology

=== School of Computer Science and Technology ===
The school was established in 1995. It was one of the earliest computer science school in China. The school ranks 8th in China and among top 100 in the world by Academic Ranking of World Universities.

Departments

- Computer Science and Technology
- Network Engineering
- Internet of Things Engineering
- Data Science and Big Data Technology
- Digital Media Technology

=== School of Mechano-electronic Engineering ===
Departments

- Industrial Design
- Electrical Engineering and Automation
- Automation
- Measurement and Control Technology and Instrumentation
- Electronic Packing Technology
- Mechanical Design, Fabrication and Automation

=== School of Microelectronics ===
The school is one of the National Instruction Bases for Integrated Circuit Talents by Ministry of Education of the People's Republic of China. Microelectronics and Solid-State Electronics is one of the National Key Disciplines.

The school has 2 undergraduate programs, 5 master's programs and 2 doctoral programs. Around 1,800 undergraduates and 850 postgraduate students are enrolled in the School.

Departments

- Microelectronics Science and Engineering
- Integrated Circuit Design and Integrated System

=== School of Physics and Optoelectronic Engineering ===
Departments

- Laser Technology
- Radio Wave Institute
- Applied Physics
- Optoelectronic Technology Experiment Center
- Physics Experiment Center

=== School of Economics and Management ===
Departments

- Information Management and Information System
- Business Administration
- Industrial Engineering
- Finance
- Electronic Commerce

=== School of Mathematics and Statistics ===
Departments

- Applied Mathematics
- Computing Science
- Probability and Statistics
- Operations Research and Control
- Psychology

=== School of Humanities and Arts ===
Departments

- Politics
- Philosophy
- Chinese Language
- History
- Art

=== School of Foreign Languages ===
Departments

- English Language& Literature
- Foreign Linguistics &Applied Linguistic
- Translation

School of Microelectronics

Departments

- Microelectronics
- Micro-circuits and Devices
- Integrated System Engineering
- Integrated Circuit Engineering

=== School of Life Science and Technology ===
Departments

- Biomedical Engineering
- Biological Technology

=== School of Aerospace Science and Technology ===
Departments

- Detection Guidance and Control

=== School of Software ===
Departments

- Software Engineering (M.S. and Ph.D.)

=== School of Advanced Materials and Nanotechnology ===
Departments

- Material Physics & Chemistry
- Material Science(M.S.)
- Applied Chemistry(M.S.)

== Research ==
Research at Xidian University consists of:

- Telecommunication Engineering
- Signal and Information Processing
- Computer Science and Engineering
- Microelectronics, IC design

Xidian University has four State Key Laboratories:

- The State Key Laboratory of Radar Signal Processing
- The State Key Laboratory of Integrated Services Network
- The State Key Laboratory of Antennas and Microwave Technology
- The State Key Laboratory of Wide Bandgap Semiconductor Technology

Xidian University has 5 Key Labs of Ministry of Education:

- Intelligent Perception Image Understanding
- Electronic Information Countermeasure and Simulation Technology
- Super high-speed Circuit Design and Electromagnetic Compatibility
- Electronic Equipment Structure
- Wide Bandgap Semiconductor Materials Devices

Xidian has 17 Provincial Key Labs:

- Network and System Security
- Wireless Communications
- Computer Peripherals &Instruments
- general-purpose Electronic Devices Measurement
- New Semiconductor Materials Instruments
- Electric System Integration Design Techniques
- Computer Network Information Security
- Microwave Communication Techniques
- Intelligent Materials and Sensors
- Electronic Countermeasure
- Biomedical Engineering
- Wireless Physics
- Electro-mechanics
- Mathematical Modeling
- Software Systematic Engineering
- Microcircuit High Reliability Techniques
- New Laser Instrument and Optical Information Processing

== Notable people ==
=== Alumni ===
- Shumin Zhai – Computer Scientist, ACM Fellow
- Liu Chuanzhi – Founder, Lenovo
- Gou Zhongwen – director of the State General Administration of Sports
- Hu Lijiao – Former Governor of the People's Bank of China
- Ling Li (writer) – Writer
- Zhang Rongqiao – Chief designer of Tianwen 1
- Robert Qiu – electrical engineer and entrepreneur
- Lai Xuejia – Cryptographer
- Gou Zhongwen – Politician
- Zhong Lin Wang – Physicist

=== Faculty ===
- Ning Cai – electrical engineer
