= Photonic Sensors =

- Discipline: Physics
- Language: English
- Edited by: Yunjiang Rao

Publication details
- History: 2011–present (4 series of volumes)
- Publisher: University of Electronic Science and Technology of China and Springer-Verlag Berlin Heidelberg (China)
- Frequency: quarterly
- Open access: Yes
- Impact factor: 2.433 (2020)

Standard abbreviations
- ISO 4: Photonic Sens.

Indexing
- CODEN: PSHEC2
- ISSN: 1674-9251 (print); 2190-7439 (web)

Links
- Journal homepage; Online access

Photonic Sensors is an international journal and has been available online as an Open Access publication since 2011. It is co-published quarterly by the University of Electronic Science & Technology of China (UESTC) and Springer. Photonic Sensors publishes original, peer-reviewed articles that report on new developments of interest to members of the photonics and sensor communities in all fields of photonic-sensing science and technology, including but not limited to topics on:

- Optical fiber sensors
- Planar waveguide sensors
- Laser-based sensors
- Biophotonic sensors and instruments
- Sensor multiplexing and networking
- Materials and devices for photonic sensing.

== Availability ==
Photonic Sensors focuses on experimental contributions related to novel principles, and structures or materials for photonic sensors. Papers that report investigations into combinations of experimental and analytical/numerical approaches are also welcome. In addition to regular research articles, Photonic Sensors publishes letters and review articles. Letters provide an opportunity to rapidly disseminate research results that are of current interest to the photonic sensor community. Photonic Sensors has an international editorial board with strong academic background. The journal's Editor-in-Chief (EIC), Professor Yun-Jiang Rao is one of the world's leading experts in the field of optical fiber sensors and recognized as a Fellow of the International Society for Optical Engineering (SPIE Fellow). Prof. Rao also serves as the Associate Editor (AE) of IEEE/OSA Journal of Lightwave Technology and Optics & Laser Technology (Elsevier). He has authored or co-authored more than 300 peer-reviewed papers in scientific journals or technical conferences, among which >200 papers were indexed in Web of Science with >3000 citations and his H-index is 28. The editorial board consists of 36 internationally recognized experts from 15 different countries or regions, with a majority (80%) of editors from outside China Mainland. All the board members are foremost experts in their research fields, covering all the scopes of Photonic Sensors. Photonic Sensors is currently covered by the following (A&I) services:

•ACM Digital Library
•Astrophysics Data System (ADS)
•Chemical Abstracts Service (CAS)
•ChemWeb
•DOAJ
•EI-Compendex since Vol. 2, Mar. 2012
•Google Scholar
•OCLC
•SCImago. Photonic Sensors has been evaluated as Q2 in 2012 and then Q1 in 2013 (Q1 means highest values and Q4 lowest values) in both Categories of Atomic and Molecular Physics and Optics(#31/212, see http://www.scimagojr.com/journalrank.php?category=3107), Electronic, Optical and Magnetic Materials(#33/272, see http://www.scimagojr.com/journalrank.php?category=2504) in the SCImago Journal Rank.
•SCOPUS. Photonic Sensors has been #6 among 590 SCOPUS journals in China in 2013, see http://www.scimagojr.com/journalrank.php?country=CN
•Summon by ProQuest According to the data in Web of Science, the 69 Photonic Sensors papers published in 2011 and 2012 have gained 104 citations, indicating a calculated impact factor of about 1.50 in 2013. Both download and citation times of the Photonic Sensors papers are increasing rapidly.
