= Granite Asia =

Asian venture capital firm

- Formerly: GGV Capital Asia
- Type: Private
- Industry: Venture capital, growth equity, private credit
- Predecessor: GGV Capital
- Founded: March 2024; 2 years ago
- Headquarters: Singapore
- Key people: Jenny Lee; Jixun Foo
- AUM: US$8.5 billion (2025)
- Website: www.graniteasia.com

Granite Asia is an Asian venture capital firm that is headquartered in Singapore. It invests with a geographical focus on Southeast Asia, China, Japan, South Asia and Australia. It was formed in 2024 after GGV Capital split up its Asia and U.S. operations into two separate successor firms. The firm is led by Jenny Lee and Jixun Foo. As of 2026, Granite Asia manages approximately US$10 billion in assets under management.

== Background ==
In July 2023, the United States House Select Committee on Strategic Competition between the United States and the Chinese Communist Party initiated an investigation into GGV Capital and other venture-capital firms' investments in China. In September 2023, GGV Capital announced it would split its business into two with one focused on Asia and the other focused on the U.S. The Asian business would be headquartered in Singapore and would focus on China, Southeast Asia and South Asia. GGV's yuan-denominated funds would continue to be managed independently under its Chinese brand Jiyuan Capital. This option allowed investors who still felt confident about China to continue investing while those who didn't have the option of choosing the U.S. focused business.

In March 2024, GGV Capital officially split into two firms, Granite Asia which would focus on Asian investments and Notable Capital which would focus on U.S. investments. The decision to abandon the GGV brand was that because both teams were operating separately going forward and felt it was best to develop new brands. The legacy GGV Capital funds focused on Asia would continue operating under the two firms. Granite Asia stated it would establish a private credit business in the year as well as expand into other asset classes and markets in Asia. It would also explore a hybrid method of funding that was a mixture of equity and debt.

In November 2024, Granite Asia received a mandate from the Indonesia Investment Authority to invest $1.2 billion in domestic technology companies.

In 2025, Granite Asia launched a private credit strategy, Libra Hybrid Capital, focused on opportunities in Asia.
