= Robert Qiu =

American academic

Robert Caiming Qiu is a Chair Professor at Tennessee Technological University in Cookeville, Tennessee. He was named a Fellow of the Institute of Electrical and Electronics Engineers (IEEE) in 2015 for his contributions to ultra-wideband wireless communications.

== Education and career ==
Qiu got his B.S. degree in electrical engineering at Xidian University in 1987. From 1987 to 1990, he studied for his M.S. at the University of Electronic Science and Technology of China, and, after obtaining it, enrolled into a Ph.D. program at New York University, where he remained until 1995. After graduation, Qiu began working at GTE Labs and by 1997 joined Bell Labs. In 2000, he became a founder and CEO of Wiscom Technologies, before becoming a professor at Tennessee Technological University in 2003. As of 2014, Qui serves as endowed chair professor at Shanghai Jiao Tong University.
