= Cheng Wei =

Chinese billionaire businessman

- 程维
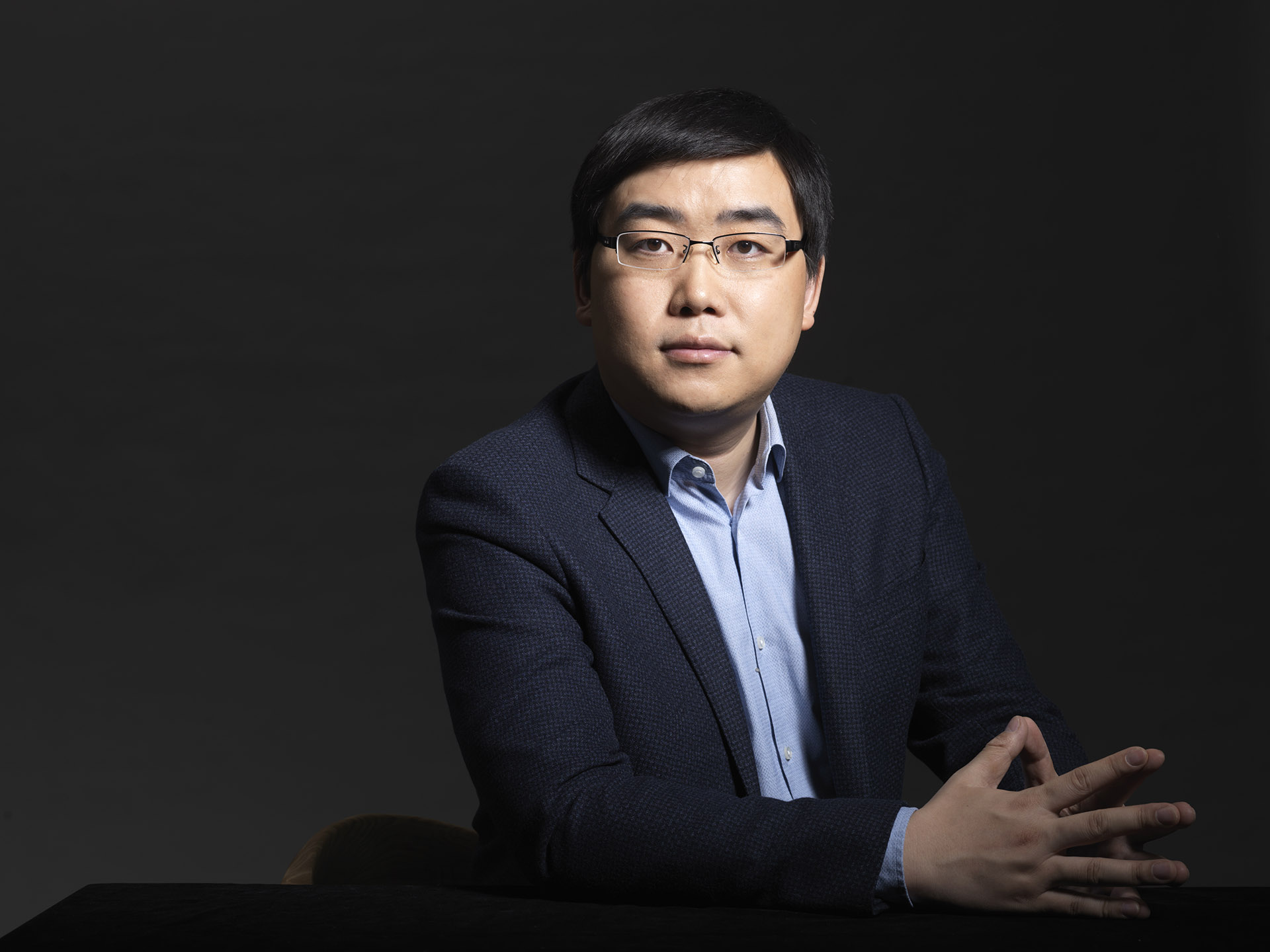
- Cheng in 2017
- Born: 19 May 1983 (age 43); Shangrao, China
- Education: Beijing University of Chemical Technology (BS)
- Occupation: Businessman
- Known for: Founder, chairman and CEO of DiDi; Founder of Beijing Xiaoju Technology Ltd.

Cheng Wei (simplified Chinese: 程维; traditional Chinese: 程維; pinyin: Chéng Wéi; born 19 May 1983) is a Chinese businessman. He is the founder, chairman and CEO of DiDi, a Chinese mobile transportation platform with global operations. In 2012, after eight years at Alibaba Group's regional and Alipay's operations, Cheng founded Beijing Xiaoju Technology Co Ltd in Zhongguancun.

== Biography ==
Cheng was born in 1983 in Jiangxi, China. He earned a bachelor's degree in engineering administration from the Beijing University of Chemical Technology.

After graduation, Cheng served as an assistant to a chairman at a foot massage company. About one year later, Cheng applied to join Alibaba as a sales person for its business-to-business e-commerce service in 2005.

For six years at Alibaba, Cheng served as a sales manager for the northern region of China. He later moved to China's largest third-party online payment platform, Alipay, where he was soon promoted to the position of regional manager.

In 2012, Cheng left Alibaba to found Beijing Xiaoju Technology Co and launch Didi Dache—translated to "Beep Beep Call a Taxi"—as the initial incarnation of his ride-hailing service.

In 2014, Cheng hired Jean Liu (Liu Qing), a former Goldman Sachs Asia managing director, as the COO of the company.

In February 2015, the company merged with its rival Kuaidi Dache and was renamed Didi Kuaidi (later renamed Didi Chuxing or "DiDi").

In August 2016, DiDi acquired all assets of the Chinese division of Uber.

== Recognition ==
Fortune named Cheng to its "40 Under 40" list in 2015 and selected him as one of its "Businessperson of the Year" honorees in 2016. The same year, Forbes Asia named him its Businessman of the Year, and Wired included him on the Wired 100. In 2017, Time placed him on its list of the 20 most influential people in technology.
