= Xiaodong Chen (electrical engineer) =

Professor of microwave engineering

Xiaodong Chen, Professor of Microwave Engineering in School of Electronic Engineering and Computer Science at the Queen Mary University of London, UK was named Fellow of the Institute of Electrical and Electronics Engineers (IEEE) in 2015 for contributions to antennas for wireless communications and satellites.

== Education ==
He received a B.Sc. in Electronic Engineering from the University of Zhejiang, Hangzhou, China in 1983, and the degree of Ph.D. in microwave electronics from the University of Electronic Science and Technology of China, Chengdu in 1988.
