= Ning Cai (engineer) =

Chinese mathematician and electrical engineer (1947–2023)

- 蔡宁
- Born: October 15, 1947
- Died: May 25, 2023 (aged 75); Bielefeld, Germany
- Known for: Fellow of the Institute of Electrical and Electronics Engineers (2015)
- Awards: IEEE Information Theory Society Paper Award (2005); IEEE Eric E. Sumner Award (2016)
- Scientific career
- Fields: Mathematics and electrical engineering

Ning Cai (Chinese: 蔡宁; 15 October 1947 - 25 May 2023) was a Chinese mathematician and electrical engineer. Ning Cai got his Ph.D. in Mathematics in 1988 at Bielefeld University in the group of Rudolf Ahlswede. He was faculty at Xidian University. In 2015, he was named Fellow of the Institute of Electrical and Electronics Engineers (IEEE) for "contributions to network coding theory and arbitrarily varying channels".

== Fields of Work ==
A list of Cai's publications between 1984 and 1997 can be found at.
