= GGV Capital =

American venture capital firm

- Type: Private
- Industry: Venture Capital
- Predecessor: Granite Global Ventures
- Founded: 2000; 26 years ago
- Defunct: March 29, 2024
- Fate: Split into Granite Asia and Notable Capital
- Headquarters: Menlo Park, California, United States
- Products: Investments
- Website: www.ggvc.com

GGV Capital (Granite Global Ventures) was an American venture capital firm founded in 2000 and based in Menlo Park, California. Known for investing across the United States and Asia, the firm had become one of the most active American investors in the Chinese artificial intelligence industry. In September 2023, amid heightened scrutiny of U.S. investment in Chinese technology, the firm said it would separate its U.S. and Asia businesses. On March 29, 2024, it ceased using the GGV brand and split into two successor firms: Notable Capital (U.S.-focused) and Granite Asia (Asia-focused).

== History ==
GGV Capital was founded in 2000 as Granite Global Ventures, with headquarters in Menlo Park, California.

In 2005, investor Jenny Lee established GGV's Shanghai office, marking the firm's expansion into mainland China.

GGV opened a Southeast Asia office in Singapore in 2019. In 2022, the firm had approximately $9 billion in assets under management.

In July 2023, the United States House Select Committee on Strategic Competition between the United States and the Chinese Communist Party announced a review of several venture investors’ China exposure, including GGV. In September 2023, GGV announced that it would spin off its China operations. On March 29, 2024, GGV split into two firms and adopted new brands: Granite Asia for the Asia business and Notable Capital for the U.S. business.

== Investments ==
Since its founding, GGV has invested in more than 200 active companies across the United States, Latin America, Israel, Southeast Asia, China and India, with over 56 of which are valued at over $1 billion. According to the Center for Security and Emerging Technology, GGV is "most active in financing Chinese AI companies."

Following US sanctions on the Chinese AI firm Megvii, GGV announced in March 2024 that the firm was “actively seeking exit” from its investment.
