= Megvii =

Chinese technology company

Megvii Technology Limited
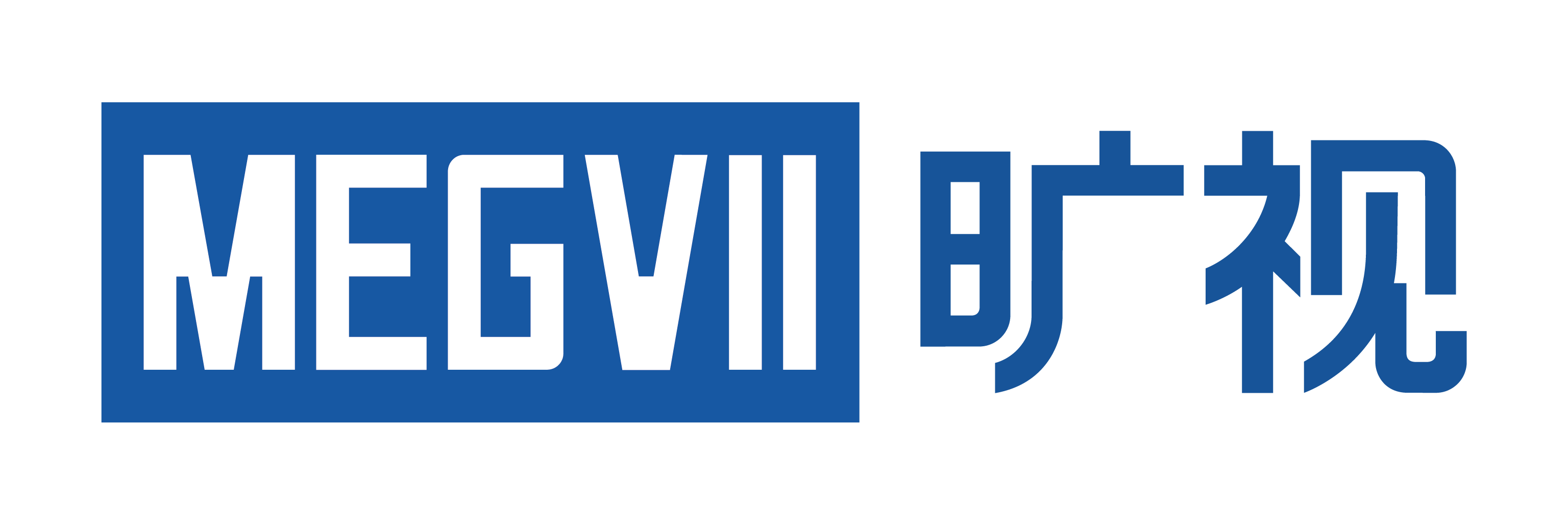
- Native name: 旷视
- Type: Private
- Industry: Technology
- Genre: Artificial intelligence
- Founded: 2011; 15 years ago
- Headquarters: Beijing, China
- Total equity: USD $4 billion (2019)
- Number of employees: 2,349 (2019)
- Website: www.megvii.com

Megvii
- Simplified Chinese: 旷视
Transcriptions
Standard Mandarin
- Hanyu Pinyin: Kuàngshì

Megvii is a Chinese technology company that designs image recognition and deep-learning software. Based in Beijing, the company develops artificial intelligence (AI) technology for businesses and for the public sector.

Megvii is the largest provider of third-party authentication software in the world, and its product, Face++, is the world's largest computer vision platform. In 2019, the company was valued at US$4 billion.

As of 2024, the company operates the world's largest computer vision research institute.

The company has faced U.S. investment and export restrictions due to allegations of aiding the persecution of Uyghurs in China.

== History ==
The company was founded in Beijing with Megvii standing for "mega vision." It was started by Yin Qi and two college friends.

The company's core product, Face++, launched in 2012 as the first online facial recognition platform in China. In 2015 Megvii created Brain++, a deep-learning engine to help train its algorithms.

Backed by GGV Capital, Megvii raised $100 million in 2016, $460 million in 2017 and $750 million in May 2019.

In 2017, Megvii marketed authentication and computational photography functions to smart phone companies and mobile application developers, then smart logistics. Megvii's AI-empowered products include personal IoT, city IoT and supply chain IoT. In 2017 and 2018, Megvii beat Google, Facebook, and Microsoft in tests of image recognition at the International Conference on Computer Vision.

By June 2019, Megvii had 2,349 employees, and was valued at over $4 billion, as the "world’s biggest provider of third-party authentication software", with 339 corporate clients in 112 cities in China. The Chinese government employs Megvii software.

In May 2019, Human Rights Watch reported finding Face++ code in the Integrated Joint Operations Platform (IJOP), a police surveillance app used to collect data on, and track the Uyghur community in Xinjiang. Human Rights Watch released a correction to its report in June 2019 stating that Megvii did not appear to have collaborated on IJOP, and that the Face++ code in the app was inoperable.

In March 2020, Megvii announced that it would make its deep learning framework MegEngine open-source.

As of 2024, Megvii operates the world's largest computer vision research institute. In July that same year, the company signed a deal with the Chongqing Liangjiang New Area's local government and Geely for AI projects in Chongqing as well as developing internet-connected intelligent cars. Due to its partnership with Geely and being the second largest shareholder at Lifan Technology Group, Yin Qi, Megvii's CEO, was appointed chairman of the board at Lifan.

=== US sanctions ===
Megvii was sanctioned by the US government, and placed on the United States Bureau of Industry and Security's Entity List on October 9, 2019, due to the use of its technology for human rights abuses against Uyghurs in Xinjiang. In December 2021, the United States Department of the Treasury prohibited all U.S. investment in Megvii, accusing the company of complicity in aiding the persecution of Uyghurs in China. In January 2024, the United States Department of Defense named Megvii on its list of "Chinese Military Companies Operating in the United States."

Following US sanctions, GGV Capital announced its intention to divest from Megvii.

In 2022, Megvii laid off workers in multiple departments as a response to U.S. sanctions and ongoing tensions between the United States and China.
