= DiDi =

Chinese vehicle for hire company

Didi Chuxing Technology Company

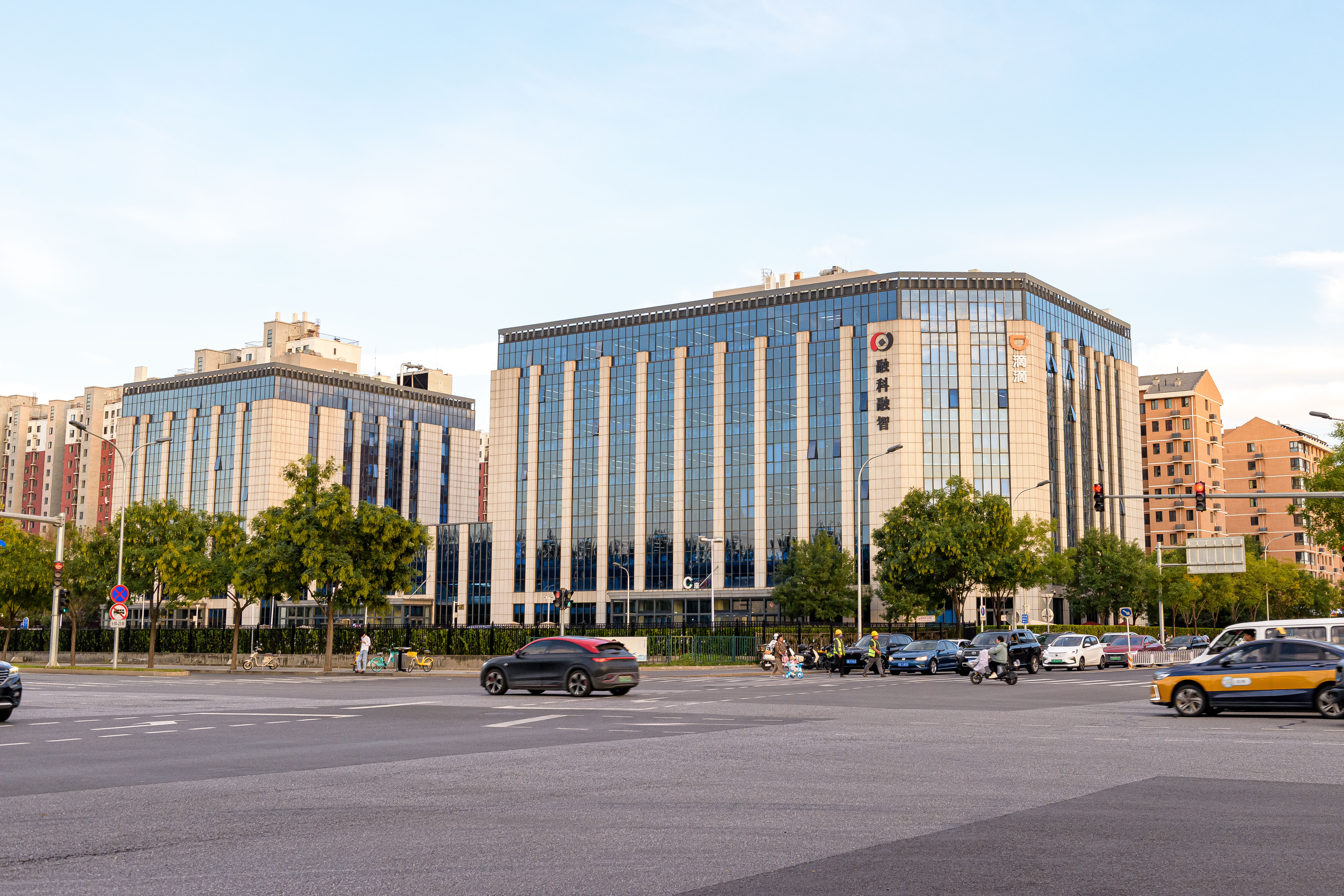
- Headquarters in Haidian, Beijing
- Formerly: Didi Kuaidi; (Feb 2015 – Sept 2015); Didi Dache, Kuaidi Dache; (pre-Feb 2015)
- Type: Public
- Traded as: OTCID Basic Current: DIDIY
- Industry: Transportation
- Founded: June 2012; 14 years ago
- Founders: Cheng Wei
- Headquarters: Beijing, China
- Area served: Mainland China; Mexico; New Zealand; Australia; Japan; Brazil; Colombia; Hong Kong; Taiwan; Chile; Costa Rica; Panama; Russia; Peru; Ecuador; Dominican Republic; Egypt; Argentina
- Key people: Cheng Wei (chairman & CEO); Liu Qing (president)
- Services: Vehicles for hire; Food delivery; Package delivery; Bicycle sharing
- Revenue: ▲US$21.633 billion (fiscal year ended 31 December 2020)
- Operating income: ▼ –US$2.105 billion (fiscal year ended 31 December 2020)
- Net income: ▼ –US$1.619 billion (fiscal year ended 31 December 2020)
- Total assets: ▲US$22.477 billion (fiscal year ended 31 December 2020)
- Total equity: ▼ –US$11.620 billion (fiscal year ended 31 December 2020)
- Owner: Softbank (21.5%); Uber (12.8%); Tencent (6.8%)
- Number of employees: 15,914 (2020)
- Parent: Xiaoju Kuaizhi Inc.
- Website: web.didiglobal.com

DiDi
- Chinese: 滴滴出行
- Literal meaning: honk honk
Transcriptions
Standard Mandarin
- Hanyu Pinyin: Dīdī Chūxíng

Former name
- Chinese: 滴滴快的
Transcriptions
Standard Mandarin
- Hanyu Pinyin: Dīdī Kuàidī

Didi Chuxing Technology Company is a Chinese mobility technology company headquartered in Beijing. The company offers app-based transportation and related services, including ride-hailing, taxi services, bike sharing and vehicle leasing. It also operates in areas such as food delivery, automobile services, and electric vehicle development. DiDi was founded in 2012 by Cheng Wei and initially launched as a taxi-hailing app under the name Didi Dache.

DiDi expanded rapidly in China and merged with rival Kuaidi Dache in 2015. In 2016, it acquired Uber's operations in China in exchange for an equity stake. The company later pursued international growth through partnerships, acquisitions, and direct expansion into markets in Latin America, Asia-Pacific, and Africa.

In June 2021, DiDi conducted an initial public offering (IPO) on the New York Stock Exchange. Days later, Chinese regulators opened a cybersecurity investigation into the company, citing concerns about data security and privacy. DiDi's apps were subsequently removed from domestic app stores, and in 2022, the company was fined 8.026 billion yuan (approximately US$1.2 billion). It delisted from the NYSE in June 2022. In early 2023, DiDi was permitted to resume new user registrations in China following regulatory review.

== History ==
=== Founding and Early Development (2012–2014) ===
DiDi was founded in Beijing in June 2012 by Cheng Wei as a taxi-hailing service under the name Didi Dache (嘀嘀打车). The company's initial offering allowed users to request licensed taxis through a smartphone app. Beijing Xiaoju Keji Co. developed the app. Tencent invested $15 million in the startup later that year. By 2014, Didi had become a leading provider in China’s emerging app-based taxi sector.

=== Merger with Kuaidi Dache (2015) ===
A study in December 2013 by Analysis International estimated that, at the time, Didi Dache (backed by Chinese Internet giant Tencent Holdings Limited) held approximately 55% of the smartphone-based taxi-hailing market in China (about 150 million Chinese were estimated to use their smartphones to hail taxis). According to the same study, Kuaidi Dache (快的打车; meaning "Fast Taxi"), backed by Alibaba Group, held most of the remaining market share. Aggressive fundraising by the two companies resulted in Didi Dache and Kuaidi Dache raising US$700 million and US$600 million from private investors, respectively, to sustain their growth in the world's largest transport market. In February 2015, the companies merged to form Didi Kuaidi.

In May 2015, Didi Kuaidi spent aggressively to compete with other startups, including Yidao Yongche (易到用车) and Uber (of which Baidu was an investor). The company also added other features to complement its basic taxi-calling function such as new premium vehicle services, functions for carpool and designated driver transportation modes and enhanced accessibility functions for passengers with disabilities. In July 2015, Didi Kuaidi completed a US$2 billion fundraising round, bringing the company's cash reserves to over US$3.5 billion; the same month, Didi Kuaidi was reported to get 80.2% market share in car hire services.

Didi Kuaidi's existing stakeholders, including Alibaba, Tencent, Temasek Holdings (Private) Ltd and Coatue Management, participated in the round, alongside new investors such as Capital International Private Equity Fund and Ping An Ventures, part of Ping An Insurance Group Co of China Ltd. The July 2015 fundraiser is ranked as the world's largest single fundraising round by any private company, as well as the largest fundraising round for a Chinese mobile internet company at that time.

By September 2015, Didi Kuaidi had obtained 80% market share in private car hailing services and 99% of the taxis market share. The same month, Didi Kuaidi announced the launch of a rebrand process, including a plan to rename itself "Didi Chuxing". Following the rebrand, in December 2015, taxi drivers concerned with the potential risk of ride-hailing applications cutting into their business protested against Didi Dache and Kuaidi Dache, forcing both companies to close their offices in the city of Luoyang.

=== 2016: acquisition of Uber China ===
By the beginning of 2016, Uber China, which started its Chinese operations in 2015, had become a major competitor to Didi Kuaidi. Uber's then-CEO, Travis Kalanick, claimed the company was losing over US$1 billion annually in China.

DiDi closed a US$4.5 billion fundraising round in June 2016, with investors including Apple, China Life Insurance Co., and a financial affiliate of Alibaba Group Holding Ltd. As part of the round, DiDi secured a $2.5 billion syndicated loan arranged by China Merchants Bank Co. This equity share fundraising round is one of the world's largest by any private company, surpassing the previous record set by DiDi.

On 1 August 2016, DiDi announced that it would acquire Uber China in an acquisition valuing Uber China at US$35 billion. As part of the deal, Uber acquired 5.89% of the combined Chinese company with preferred equity interest which at the time equated to a 17.7% economic interest in DiDi. The transaction also provided DiDi with a minority equity interest in Uber.

In April 2019, Uber released a public version of its S-1 filing ahead of its planned initial public offering. As part of the filing, Uber revealed that at the time of filing, the company owned a 15.4% stake in DiDi. Uber's stake in the company was diluted (from 17.7% in 2016 to the 2019 stake) as a result of new investments from additional investors since 2016.

=== 2017–2020: business expansion, crisis and safety system enhancement ===
In March 2017, The Wall Street Journal reported that SoftBank Group Corporation approached DiDi with an offer to invest $6 billion in the company to fund the ride-hailing firm's expansion in self-driving car technologies, with a significant portion of the money to come from SoftBank's then-planned $100 billion Vision Fund.

On 28 April 2017, DiDi announced it closed a new financing round of over US$5.5 billion to support its global expansion strategy and continued investments in AI-based technologies. The round valued the company at US$50 billion.

In December 2017, Reuters reported that DiDi had raised $4 billion for a global push into foreign markets and investments into technologies such as Artificial Intelligence.

In May 2018, the company received a wave of negative media coverage when a female passenger on the company's Hitch social carpooling service was murdered by her driver. In August of the same year, a second female passenger was raped and killed by her driver using the same Hitch service on the DiDi platform. Following these incidents, DiDi suspended its Hitch services in August 2018, and began to reform its platform with improved safety standards. In September 2018, Didi announced an investment of $20 million in customer service and that a customer service team of 8,000 staff would be set up. The app's safety updates included an evolving set of safety precautions and in-app functions, including the formation of an in-app safety center, en-route audio recording, police assistance button and blocking function to restrict service from certain drivers and passengers. As part of the update, DiDi created an online discussion platform to facilitate online and offline national public opinion surveys in China. Media reported that in 2018, DiDi recorded losses of up to $1.61 billion owing to heavy spend on training and recruitment of qualified and skilled drivers.

In 2018, the company launched its "Red Flag Steering Wheel" program in which verified Chinese Communist Party (CCP) members would be visible as drivers. The company also pledged to hire 1,000 CCP members as part of its safety drive.

Since late 2020, DiDi cooperates with BYD and developed the BYD D1 for ride-hailing services.

Following the launch of the BYD D1, in April 2021, DiDi officially started its own car-building plan, code-named "Da Vinci". The headquarters of the car building team is located in Shunyi District, Beijing and has recruited 1,700 employees, covering R&D, senior algorithm engineer, autonomous driving development team and so on. The known first project to be launched was codenamed Mona during its development starting from 2021. Original plans were to launch Didi's own budget entry level EV brand, and the Mona would be the first vehicle of the brand to be launched. Plans started to change in late 2022 when the development of the Mona project was near complete, while camouflaged testing prototypes were seen driving around as early as March 2023, the layoff has begun and the majority of the Da Vinci team was dismissed before Didi sold its EV development business along with the Mona project to XPeng in August 2023. The vehicle was previewed with a set of images in June 2024, then introduced in July 2024 and went on sale in August 2024 as the Mona M03 ahead of the 2024 Chengdu Auto Show.

=== 2021–present: initial public offering and regulatory scrutiny ===
On 10 June 2021, DiDi filed to go public on the New York Stock Exchange hoping to raise $10 billion, making it the second-largest Chinese share offering in the US since Alibaba. On 16 June, it was reported that the State Administration for Market Regulation (SAMR) launched an investigation into DiDi around pricing and competitive practices. On 30 June the company went public on the NYSE under the stock ticker "DIDI", raising $4.4 billion on a valuation of close to $70 billion US dollars. It did so against Chinese government guidance. The Cyberspace Administration of China (CAC) had sought to persuade DiDi to postpone its IPO filing in order to allow time for a more thorough cybersecurity review.

On 4 July 2021, the CAC ordered app stores to remove DiDi, citing violations around the company's collection and usage of personal information. According to Chinese regulators, the company had delivered sensitive data to the United States Securities and Exchange Commission. The CAC cited the National Security Law, the 2017 Cybersecurity Law, and Measures on Cybersecurity Review as the basis for its approach.

The cybersecurity investigation of DiDi coincided with nationalistic public sentiment against the company. Chinese netizens frequently asserted that the company had turned over sensitive data to United States authorities during the IPO and described the company as a "traitor" and "walking dog" of the United States.

Chinese authorities ordered all app stores in China to remove 25 apps owned and operated by DiDi, including Didi Chuxing Enterprise Edition, Uber China, and D-Chat. Chinese regulators also fined DiDi, along with other Chinese tech firms such as Alibaba and Tencent, for alleged violations of the Anti-Monopoly Law. The fines were for 500,000 yuan ($77,174) per violation —the maximum amount for such violations.

Due to the uncertainty surrounding DiDi and other Chinese companies listed in the US, the U.S. Securities and Exchange Commission temporarily halted all IPOs from Chinese companies in August 2021. DiDi also revealed that it was under investigation by the SEC in regards to its IPO.

In December 2021, DiDi announced that it planned to delist from New York and re-list on the Hong Kong Stock Exchange. However, DiDi's plans to re-list on the Hong Kong Stock Exchange were halted in March 2022 after the CAC informed DiDi executives that they still failed to meet security regulations, and DiDi's shares fell 44% as a result.

DiDi formally de-listed from the NYSE on 13 June 2022 and began trading over-the-counter under the symbol "DIDIY". DiDi was fined 8.026 billion yuan ($1.2 billion USD) by the CAC in July 2022 for breaking its cybersecurity laws. DiDi CEO, Cheng Wei, and DiDi President, Jean Liu, were also fined $150,000 each for the violations.

DiDi received approval to restart new user registration in China in January 2023 in a move seen as a softening of China's crackdown on its tech companies.

In August 2023, it was announced DiDi had agreed to sell its autonomous driving technology unit and EV development project to the Guangzhou-headquartered electric vehicle manufacturer, Xpeng, in exchange for $744 million worth of shares.

On 19 May 2024, Jean Liu, co-founder of DiDi, stepped down from her roles as president and board director after a decade at the helm of the company. Liu has announced she will continue as "permanent partner" and chief people officer, focusing on the company's long-term development, including talent and corporate social responsibility, while DiDi, which had faced significant regulatory scrutiny, will no longer have a president position.

== Services ==
DiDi serves 550 million users across over 400 cities. A total of 7.43 billion rides were completed on DiDi's platform in 2017. Some of DiDi's services include:

DiDi Taxi: Launched in September 2012, the service provides intelligent request-dispatching system for taxi companies. DiDi currently partners with more than 500 taxi companies in China, Japan and Brazil.

DiDi Express: Launched in May 2015, the service matches riders traveling in the same direction with an available shared car. DiDi ExpressPool carries over 2.4 million daily rides in 2018.

DiDi Premier: Launched in April 2014 and rebranded in 2018, the service includes a 24/7 customer service hotline in Chinese and English and services, including vehicles equipped with child seats, adapted vehicles for riders with disabilities, and arrangements for guide dogs.

Designated Driving: Launched in July 2015, the service lets customers who own a vehicle request a chauffeur to drive them. In 2015, the service operated in about 200 cities.

Enterprise Solution: The service offers business travel services to about 170,000 corporate clients.

DiDi Bus: Launched initially in Beijing and Shenzhen in 2015, the platform offers a real-time minibus pooling service (U+ Bus), customized bus services (Youdian Bus), data-based intelligent bus dispatching service and real-time bus service inquiry service. In 2018, DiDi launched an intermodal transportation recommendation function allowing users to search and book public transportation, online car-hailing and bike-sharing services in a single smartphone screen.

DiDi Luxe: Launched in May 2017, the service offers chauffeurs and mid-to-high end cars.

Bike-Sharing: In April 2017, DiDi added bike-sharing services to its app. On 17 January 2018, DiDi launched its own bike-sharing platform, which integrates companies like Ofo, Bluegogo and DiDi-branded bikes and e-bikes.

Xiaoju Automobile Solutions: Incubated in 2015 and put in trial operation in April 2018, Xiaoju provides various auto-related services, including leasing and trading, refueling and recharging, maintenance, repair and car-sharing services to DiDi drivers and independent car owners. In August 2018, DiDi announced a $1 billion investment into the platform. In January 2019, a Xiaoju Automobile Solutions app was launched.

DiDi Financial Services: In January 2019, DiDi announced the launch of a new line of financial services, such as car insurance, personal loans and crowdfunded medical insurance, available through a separate "DiDi Finance" app.

DiDi Food: Launched in April 2018, DiDi Foodie is DiDi's food delivery service, available in Mexico, Brazil and China.

DiDi English: In May 2017, DiDi released an English-language service in mainland China. The service offers English-language user interface and a real-time, in-app text message translation to facilitate rider-driver communication.

== Technology ==
DiDi launched AI Labs in Beijing and in 2018 the company opened DiDi Labs in Mountain View, California. This facility mainly focuses on AI-based security and intelligent driving technologies.

In April 2018, DiDi and the Beijing Capital International Airport Public Security Bureau Traffic Detachment jointly built a smart transportation innovation laboratory. Since 2018, the traffic lights at more than 30 intersections in the airport area have been optimized, and the delays in the airport area at night peaks have been reduced by about 20%. As of 2019, DiDi Smart Transportation projects have been deployed in more than 20 cities, including Jinan, Guiyang, Tianjin, and Shenzhen. These projects include traffic management systems, smart traffic lights, smart traffic screens, and reversible lanes.

== International Operations ==
DiDi expanded in Latin America after acquiring control of Brazil's 99 in January 2018. It launched ride‑hailing in Mexico in 2018 and in Chile and Colombia in 2019, and later launched in Costa Rica.

In the Asia‑Pacific region, the company offers taxi‑hailing in Japan through DiDi Mobility Japan, a joint venture with SoftBank, and it launched ride‑hailing in Australia in 2018. DiDi has adjusted its footprint in other regions, including exiting South Africa in April 2022, and reversing a plan to leave Russia in February 2022.

== Honors ==
- 2015: DiDi was announced as a World Economic Forum Global Growth Company
- 2016: DiDi was included in Fortune "Change the World" list
- 2016: DiDi was named one of the World's 50 Smartest Companies by MIT Technology Review
- 2017: DiDi was nominated as one of the best five startups for TechCrunch's 10th Annual Crunchies Awards
- 2018: DiDi was included in Fast Company's "Top 10 Most innovative Companies in China" list
- 2018: DiDi was included in the Global Clean Tech 100 list by Cleantech Group
- 2018: DiDi was named on CNBC's Disruptor 50 list
- 2018: DiDi was selected on Fortune's Change The World list
- 2018: DiDi Rider App was recognized as Best Hidden Gem for Mexico in Google Play's Best of 2018 list
- 2021: DiDi was named one of the 100 Most Influential Companies by Time.
