= China University of Petroleum =

Public universities in China

China University of Petroleum (East China)
- 中国石油大学 (华东)
- Other name: Shí Dà Huádōng (石大华东)
- Former names: Beijing Petroleum Institute; Huadong Petroleum Institute; University of Petroleum
- Motto: 惟真惟实
- Type: Public university
- Established: 1953; 73 years ago
- Academic affiliations: Project 211
- Chairman: Yong Wang
- President: Fang Hao
- Location: Qingdao and Dongying, China
- Website: www.upc.edu.cn

Chinese name
- Simplified Chinese: 中国石油大学 (华东)
- Traditional Chinese: 中國石油大學 (華東)
Transcriptions
Standard Mandarin
- Hanyu Pinyin: Zhōngguó Shíyóu Dàxué (Huádōng)

The China University of Petroleum (East China) is a national public university located in Qingdao, Shandong, China. It is affiliated with the Ministry of Education, and is co-sponsored by the Ministry of Education, five major state energy corporations, and the Province of Shandong. The university is part of Project 211 and the Double First-Class Construction.

The China University of Petroleum (Beijing) is a national public university located in Beijing, China. It is affiliated with and sponsored by the Ministry of Education. The university is part of Project 211 and the Double First-Class Construction.

Since 2005, the two institutions became two separate legal entities with different constitutions and administrative boards.

== History ==
The university, founded in 1953, was known then as Beijing Petroleum Institute. It was founded acquiring the best petroleum associated departments in the country:

- Petroleum research groups in Department of Geology, Department of Mining and Department of Chemical Engineering from Tsinghua University
- Petroleum research groups in four departments of Peiyang University (now Tianjin University)
- Part of Department of Chemical Engineering from Peking University
- Part of Department of Mathematics from Yanching University (now merged into Peking University)
- Some students and faculty from fluid fuel research group in Department of Chemical Engineering from Dalian Institute of Technology (now Dalian University of Technology)
- Some students and faculty in Department of Mining and Department of Chemical Engineering from Northwestern Polytechnical Institute (now the Northwestern Polytechnical University)

It moved to Dongying, Shandong Province in 1969, with name changed to Huadong Petroleum Institute. In 1988, it was renamed The University of Petroleum consisting of one part in Dongying as the college and one in Beijing as the graduate school. Each gradually developed into universities with both undergraduate and graduate students. In January 2005, its name changed to China University of Petroleum. In 2004, China University of Petroleum (Huadong) began to move to Qingdao, and completed the relocation in 2012. The Dongying campus currently serves as the base for continuing education, remote education, research laboratories, and industry collaboration.

University rankings

Global – Overall
- QS World: =686 (2026)

China University of Petroleum specializes in upstream, midstream and downstream petroleum science and engineering, in the overall level of domestic lead. Its five national key disciplines (second-level) are:

- Chemical Engineering and Technology
- Mineral Resources Prospecting and Exploration
- Oil and Gas Well Engineering
- Oil and Gas Storage and Transportation Engineering
- Oil and Gas Field Development Engineering

== Campus Environment ==
=== China University of Petroleum (Beijing) ===
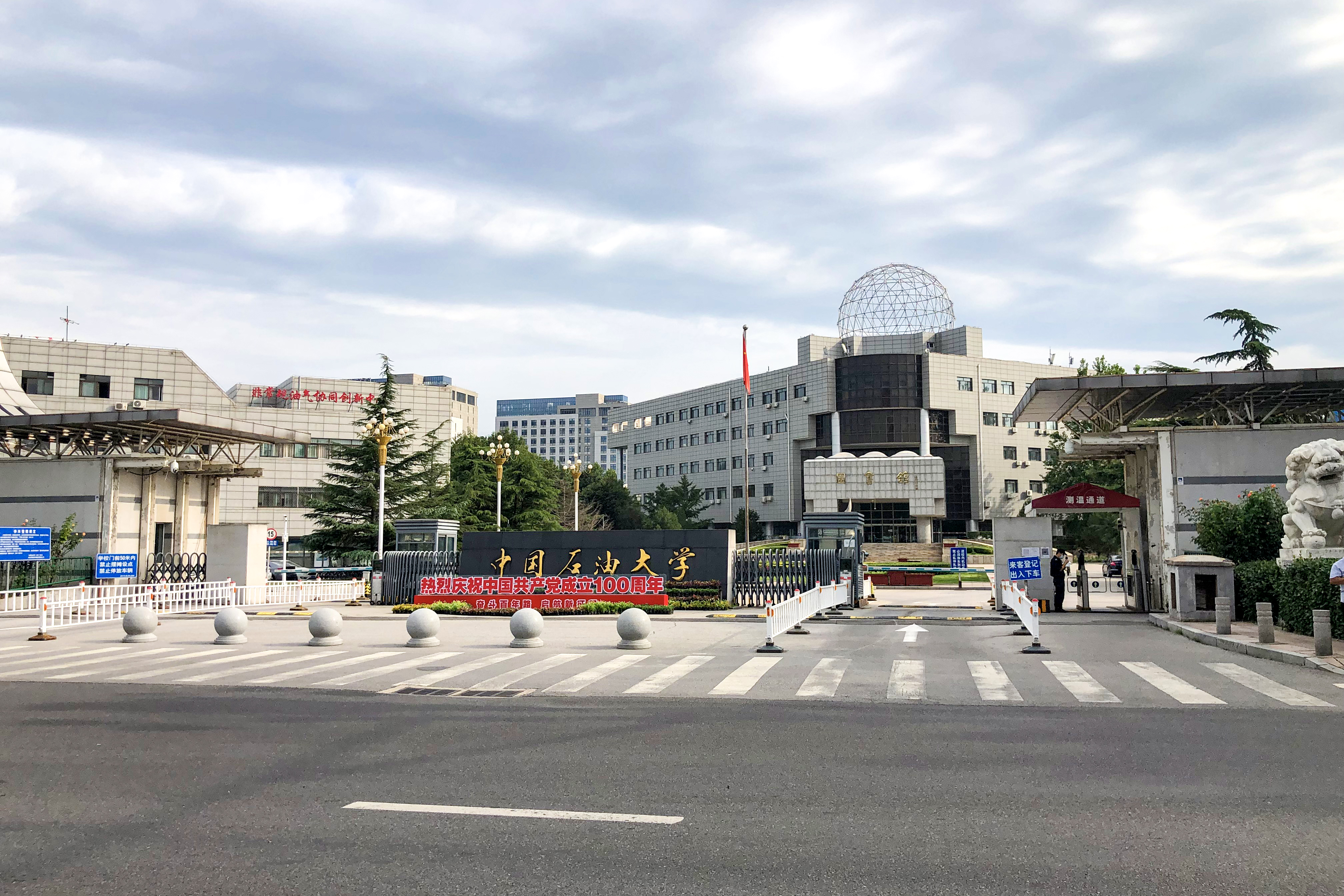
North gate of China University of Petroleum, Beijing

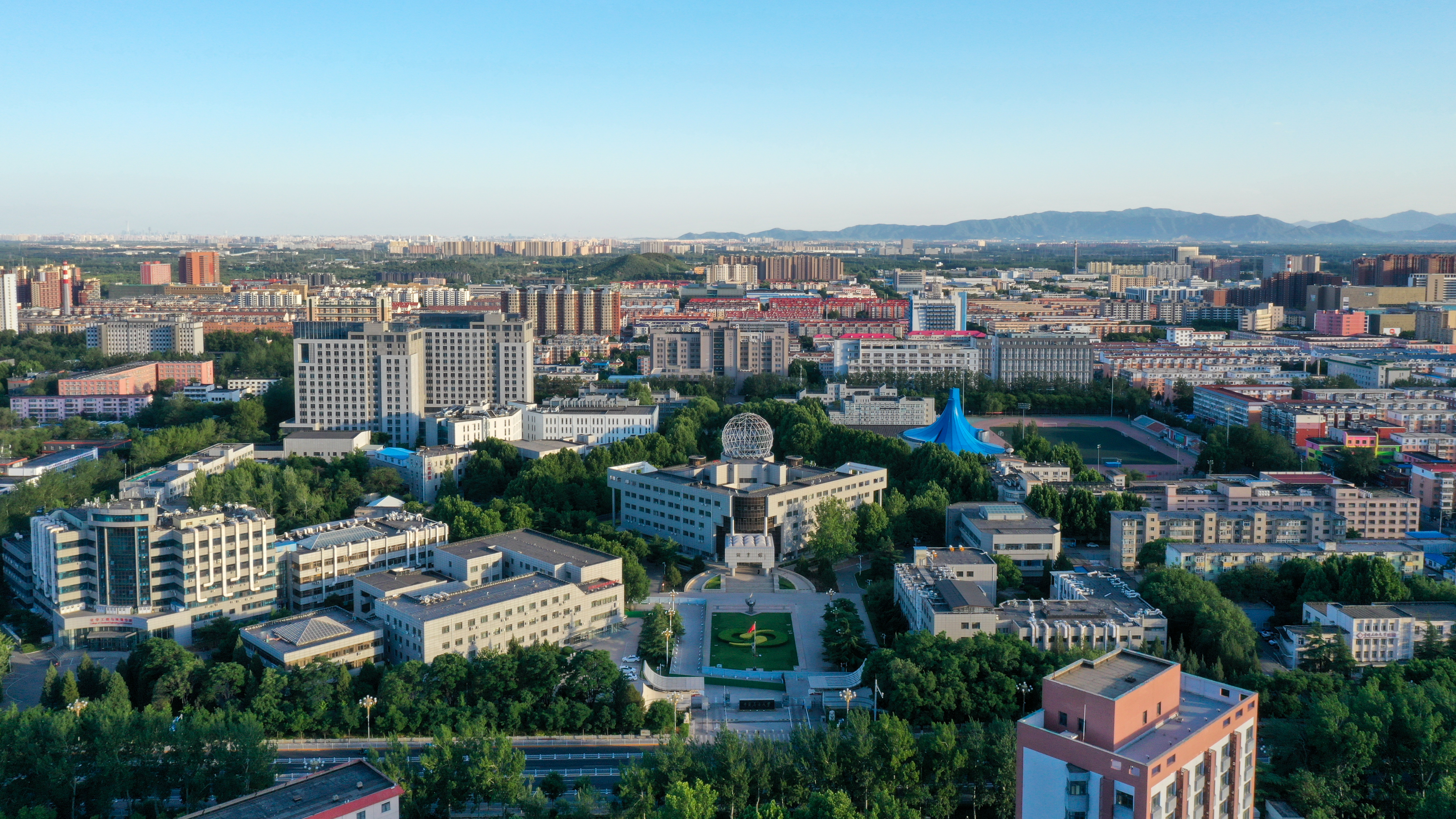
Campus aerial view

=== China University of Petroleum (East China) ===
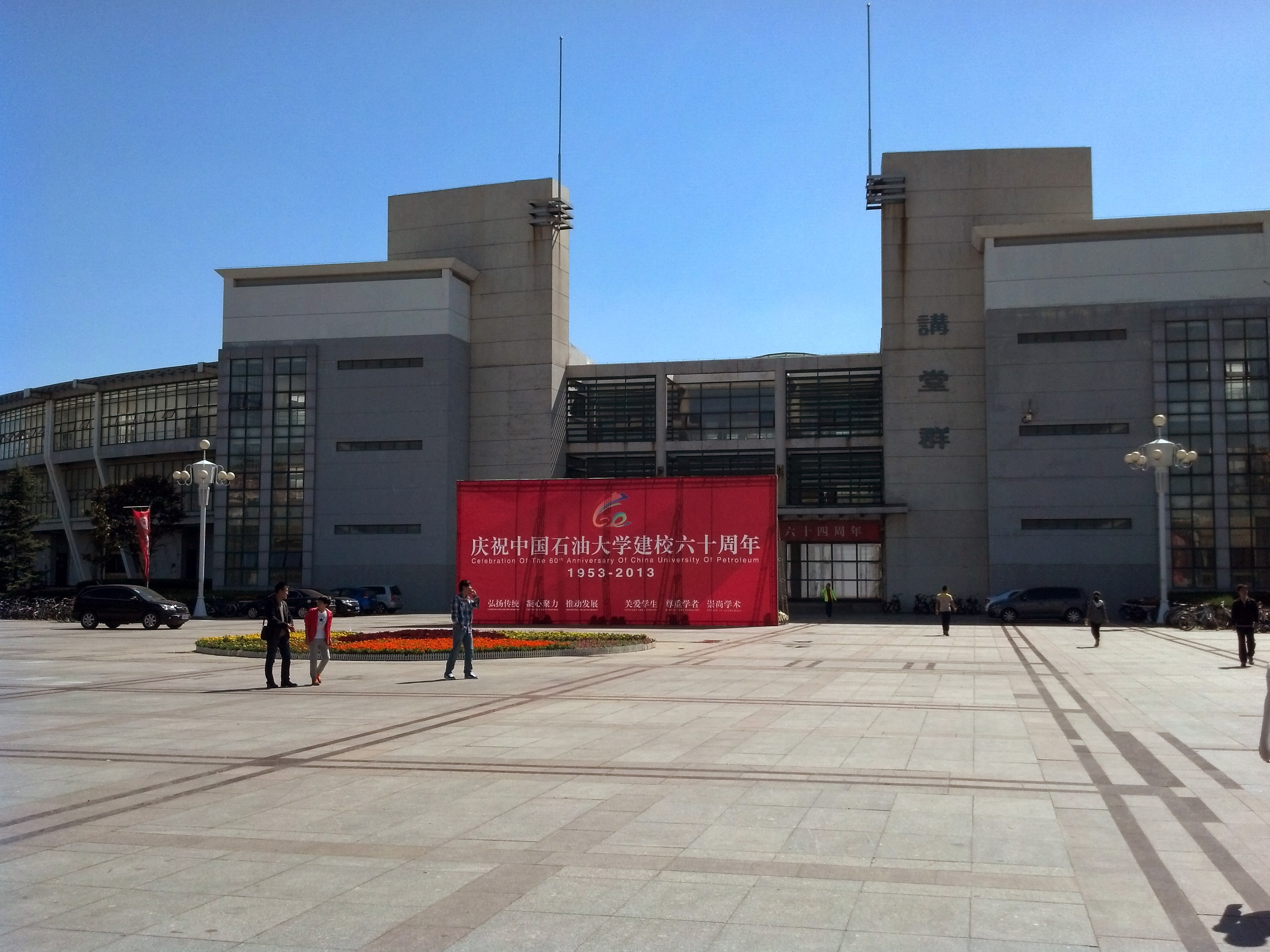
The Qingdao Campus is located in the street of Changjiang Road, Huangdao District.

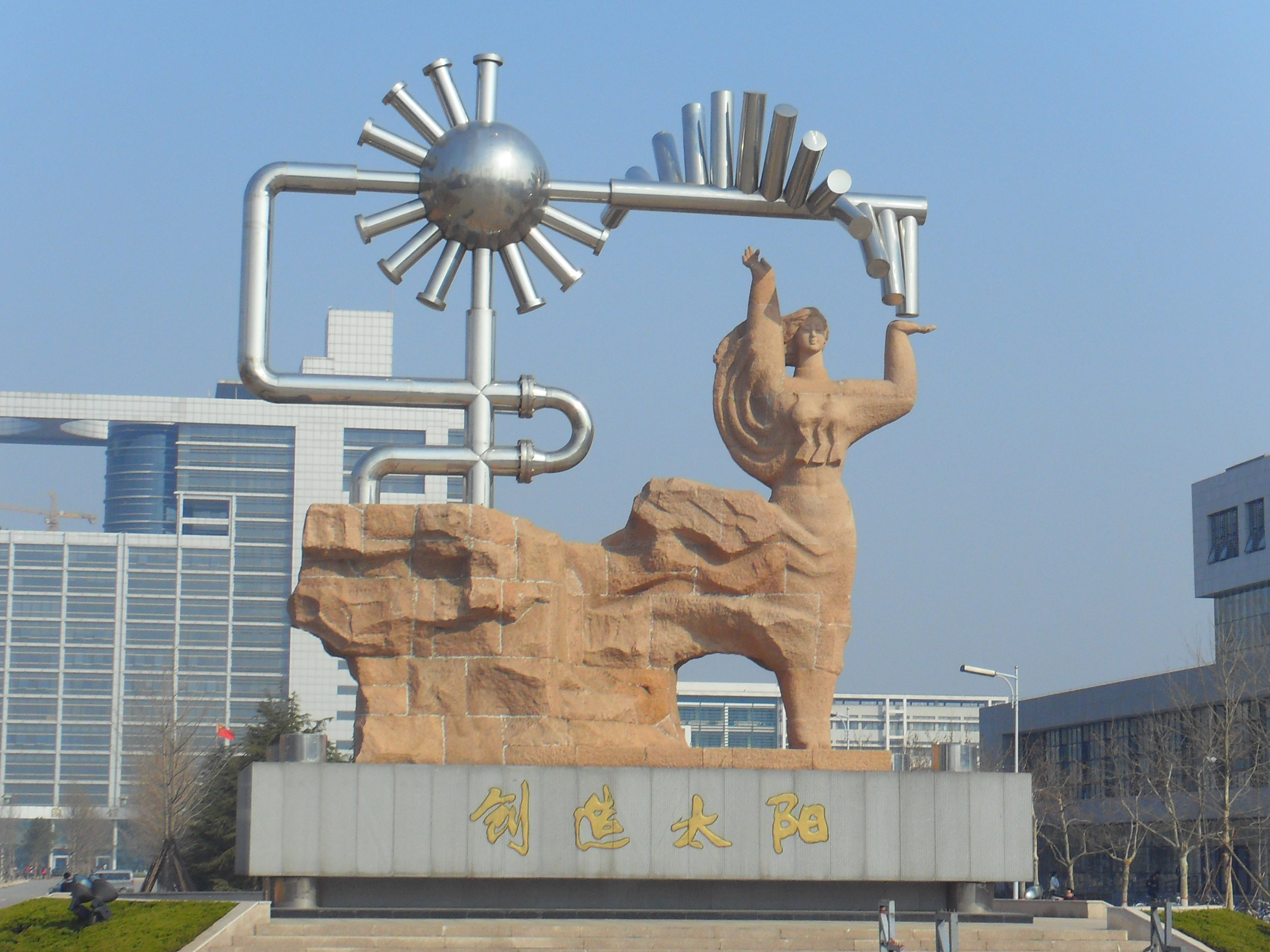
The China University of Petroleum (East China) logo sculpture ‘Creating the Sun’, there are two of them, the sculpture shown in this picture is located in Huangdao Campus.
