= National Key Disciplines =

Important university subjects in China

National Key Disciplines (Chinese: 国家重点学科; pinyin: Guójiā Zhòngdiǎn Xuékē) is a list of academic disciplines currently recognized as important by the central government of the People's Republic of China.

== See also ==
- List of universities in China
- Double First-Class Construction
- State Key Laboratory
