= University of Electronic Science and Technology of China =

Public research university in Chengdu, China

- 电子科技大学
- Motto: 求实求真 大气大为
- Motto in English: To seek facts and truth, to be noble and ambitious
- Type: Public university
- Established: 1956; 70 years ago
- Affiliations: Ministry of Education, Double First-Class Construction, 211 Project, 985 Project, AMBA
- President: Jun Hu
- Party Secretary: Ping Cao
- Faculty: 3,800
- Students: 40,000
- Undergraduates: 23,000
- Postgraduates: 15,000
- Location: Chengdu, Sichuan, China; 30.750724556157014°N 103.93011689054471°E
- Campus: Qingshuihe Shahe Jiulidi Yongning
- Colors: Dark Blue; Yellow Ginkgo
- Website: uestc.edu.cn en.uestc.edu.cn

Chinese name
- Simplified Chinese: 电子科技大学
- Traditional Chinese: 電子科技大學
Transcriptions
Standard Mandarin
- Hanyu Pinyin: Diànzǐ Kējì Dàxué

The University of Electronic Science and Technology of China (UESTC) is a public university in Chengdu, Sichuan, China. Founded in 1956 by the instruction of then Premier Zhou Enlai, the university is affiliated with the Ministry of Education of China. It is co-sponsored by the Ministry of Education, the Ministry of Industry and Information Technology, the Sichuan Provincial Government, and the Chengdu Municipal Government. The university is part of Project 211, Project 985, and the Double First-Class Construction.

UESTC was established on the basis of the incorporation of electronics divisions of then three universities including Jiaotong University (now Shanghai Jiao Tong University and Xi'an Jiaotong University), Nanjing Institute of Technology (now Southeast University), and South China Institute of Technology (now South China University of Technology). Now UESTC is a multidisciplinary research university with electronic science and technology as its nucleus, engineering as its major field, and featured with management, liberal art and medicine.

UESTC is consisted of four campuses: Qingshuihe, Shahe, Jiulidi, and Yongning, with a gross built-up area of 1,490 km^{2} (370,000 acres). It has more than 40 schools and 65 undergraduate majors (13 of them are national-level featured majors). In 2022, UESTC has more than 42,000 students and 3,800 faculties.

== History ==
In 1956 summer, under the instruction of Premier Zhou Enlai, the inception of Chengdu Institute of Radio Engineering (CIRE) ushered in the first higher education institution of electronic and information science and technology of China. CIRE was then created from the combination of electronics-allied divisions of three well-established universities: Shanghai Jiao Tong University, Southeast University (then Nanjing Institute of Technology) and South China University of Technology. As early as the 1960s, it was ranked as one of the nation's key higher education institutions, which represents the importance of this university. In 1988, CIRE was renamed University of Electronic Science and Technology of China (UESTC). In 1997, UESTC was selected as one of the top 100 key universities by the "State's Education Revival Project" (Project 211). In 2000, UESTC was transferred to the MoE-university system, hence a national key university directly affiliated to the State's Ministry of Education. In 2001, UESTC was selected as one of the 39 research-intensive universities in China that gain special funding under "Project 985" for developing into world-class universities. In 2007, the new campus Qingshuihe was put into use. In 2017, UESTC has been included in the state Double First Class University Plan as a Class A Double First Class University.

Today, UESTC has developed into a multidisciplinary university directly reporting to the Ministry of Education, which has electronic information science and technology as its nucleus, science and engineering as its major field, and incorporates management, economics, medicine and liberal arts. UESTC has more than 3,800 faculty members, of whom 8 are academicians of CAS & CAE, 325 full professors, and 483 associate professors, 21 IEEE Fellows, 121 "Thousand Talents Program" recipients, and 15 Elsevier highly cited scholars.

== Academic Schools ==
Built on the Stanford Model and as a member of both the "Project 985" and the "Project 211", UESTC is an electronics-centered multidisciplinary leading research university, covering all of the 6 National Key Disciplines categorized for higher education in electronic and information science and technology in China and a broad range of subjects. In 1984 and 2018, many of the schools are reorganized.

- Academic Schools (Founded Year)
  - School of Information and Communication Engineering (1956)
  - School of Electronic Science and Engineering (2018)
  - School of Materials and Energy (2018)
  - School of Mechanical and Electrical Engineering (1964)
  - School of Optoelectronic Science and Engineering (1956)
  - School of Automation Engineering (1957)
  - School of Resources and Environment (2012)
  - School of Computer Science and Engineering (1979)
  - School of Information and Software Engineering (2011)
  - School of Aeronautics and Astronautics (2006)
  - School of Mathematical Sciences (1958)
  - School of Physics (1984)
  - School of Medicine (2013)
  - School of Life Science and Technology (1984)
  - School of Management and Economics (1982)
  - School of Public Affairs and Administration (1956)
  - School of Foreign Languages (1984)
  - School of Marxism (1956)
  - Glasgow College (2013)
  - Glasgow College Hainan (2022)
  - Institute of Fundamental and Frontier Science (2014)
  - National Key Laboratory of Science and Technology on Communications (1996)
  - Yingcai Honors College (2009)
  - Shenzhen Institute for Advanced Study (2019)
- Academic Institutes (Founded Year)
  - Research Institute of Electronic Science and Technology, Chengdu, Sichuan (2003)
  - Guangdong Research Institute of Electronic Information Engineering of UESTC, Dongguan, Guangdong (2007)
  - Chengdu Research Institute of UESTC, Chengdu, Sichuan (2012)
  - Yibin Park of UESTC, Yibin, Sichuan (2017)
  - Yangtze Delta Region Institute (Quzhou), Quzhou, Zhejiang (2020)
  - Chongqing Institute of Microelectronics Industry Technology, Chongqing (2020)
  - Yangtze Delta Region Institute (Huzhou), Huzhou, Zhejiang (2020)
- Independent Colleges
  - Chengdu College
  - Zhongshan Institute

== Academics and Rankings ==
=== China Discipline Evaluation by the Ministry of Education of China ===
The China Discipline Evaluation (CDE) is the official assessment of the quality of disciplines (grouped into 14 domains and 113 first-level disciplines) in China and is one of the most important rankings for Chinese universities. The CDE is conducted every ~5 years starting in 2002. Ranking rule of the fourth CDE: A+ is among the top 2%, A is 2%-5%, A− is 5%-10%, B+ is 10%-20%, B is 20%-30%, B− is 30%-40%, C+ is 40%-50%, C is 50%-60%, and C− is 60%-70%. Previous CDEs are evaluated by a score of 0-100.

Discipline	Rank (2017)	Rank (2012)	Rank (2007)	Rank (2004)
Electronic Science and Technology	1st (A+)	1st (92)	2nd (93)	3rd (84.7)
Information and Communication Engineering	1st (A+)	2nd (87)	5th (88)	8th (80.0)
Computer Science and Engineering	5th (A)	12th (76)	19th (74)	20th (69.1)
Optical Engineering	5th (A−)	5th (81)	10th (76)	18th (66.8)
Instrumentation Science and Technology	8th (A−)	7th (78)	-	18th (71.0)
Biomedical Engineering	8th (B+)	10th (77)	12th (71)	14th (64.7)
Software Engineering	17th (B+)	34th (70)	-	-
Management Science and Engineering	19th (B+)	-	24th (72)	30th (65.7)
Business Administration	25th (B+)	17th (78)	-	-
Mechanical Engineering	38th (B)	-	-	35th (63.2)
Material Science and Engineering	35th (B)	-	-	37th (66.3)
Control Science and Engineering	33rd (B)	-	-	24th (66.2)
Public Administration	29th (B)	-	-	-
Electrical Engineering	44th (C)	-	-	-
Chemical Engineering and Technology	87th (C−)	-	-	-
Applied Economics	-	-	-	30th (65.0)
Politics	-	-	-	23rd (64.4)
Foreign Language and Literature	-	-	-	25th (62.1)
Physics	-	-	-	26th (67.3)

=== General Rankings ===
University rankings
BCUR National	Domestic	33
Wu Shulian National	Domestic	30
CUAA National	Alumni	31
QS National	General	36
THE National	General	25–28
QS Asia (Asia version)	General	217
THE Asia (Asia version)	General	63
ARWU World	Research	151–200
QS World	General	=488
THE World	General	301–350
USNWR World	General	=152

According to College and university rankings, ARWU, QS, and THE are three most established and influential global rankings.

Global Rankings
Board	2026	2025	2024	2023	2022	2021	2020	2019	2018	2017	2016	2015	2014	2013	2012	2011	2010	2009
ARWU		151-200	151-200	101-150	151-200	151-200	151-200	151-200	201-300	201-300	301-400							
QS	519	451	486	561-570	591-600	701-750	751-800											
US News		137	153	231	272	342	507	555	597	584	572							
THE		301-350	351-400	401-500	501-600	501-600	601-800	n/a	801-1000	801+	601-800							
CWUR		233	276	319	346	381	438	484	710	783	783	790						
NTUR			133	180	236	184	200	280	372	440								
RUR		247	220	250	414	476	567	611	631	523								
URAP		85	103	129	153	166	191	264										

=== National Rankings ===
National Rankings
Board	2026	2025	2024	2023	2022	2021	2020	2019	2018	2017	2016	2015	2014	2013	2012	2011	2010	2009	2008	2007	2006	2005	2004	2003
Best Chinese Universities Ranking by ARWU	33	33	31	28	30	31	32	27	33	34	36	35												
Alumni Association China University (校友会中国大学排名)		31	29	30	30	33	34	37	34	29	37	37	42	45	47	47	49	49	50	49	39	46	37	46
Wushulian (武书连)		30	30	33	34	36	36	39	37	37	39	40	40	38	39	40	37	43	48					

=== National Key Disciplines ===
- Communication and Information System
- Signal and Information Processing
- Circuit and System
- Electromagnetic Field and Microwave Technology
- Microelectronics and Solid-State Electronics Physical Electronics
- Optical Engineering
- Applied Computer Technology

== Research Strength ==
=== State Key Laboratories ===
- SKL of Communication Technology
- SKL of Electronic Thin Film and Integrated Devices
- SKL of Microwave Devices
- SKL of High Power Radiation
- SKL of Ultra-High Frequency Complicated System

=== University Research Centers ===
- Big Data Center
- Robot Research Center
- Medical Information Center
- Photoelectric Detection and Sensor Integration Technology Research Center
- IC Research Center
- Earth Science Information Center
- Cyberspace Security Research Center

== Students ==
=== National Electronic Designing Contest: Top scoring team since 2005 ===
- 6 first prizes and ranked 1st among 729 competing universities (2007)
- 6 first prizes and ranked 1st among 790 competing universities the only NEC Cup winner (2009)
- Ranked 1st in the National Postgraduate Electronic Design Contest (2010)
- 11 first prizes and ranked 2nd among 1044 competing universities (2013)
- 10 first prizes and ranked 1st among 805 competing universities (2015)

=== The Asia-Pacific Robot Contest (ABU Robocon) ===
- Champion in ABU Robocon (China-site), July, 2010; 2012; 2013; 2015
- Champion in ABU Robocon (final in Egypt), Sept, 2010
- Champion in ABU Robocon (final in HK), Aug, 2012

=== Mathematical Modeling Contest ===
- No.1 in National Mathematic Modeling Contest for University Students (2004, 2006, 2015)
- Outstanding Winner in American MCM & ICM (2004, 2011, 2012, 2014)

=== International Genetic Engineering Machine Competition, iGEM ===
- Gold Medal at Asia-Pacific site, 2013, 2014
- Gold Medal in the world final at MIT, 2013, 2014

== International collaboration ==
=== International Cooperation ===
UESTC has collaborative and solid relationships with over 200 universities and research institutes in 67 countries, as reflected in visits for academic purposes, joint research and joint application of research projects, joint academic conferences and workshops, joint supervisions of Master and Ph.D. degrees and student exchange programs. There are over 1000 students from 67 countries study for bachelor, master and Ph.D degrees in UESTC as well as over 500 short term international students in UESTC every year.

=== Joint Education Projects authorized by the MOE ===
1. International MBA Joint Program by UESTC and Webster University (USA, 2003)
2. DBA Joint Program by UESTC and ISCTE (Portugal, 2009)
3. AF-Chengdu: UESTC-Alliance Française Joint Center of French Training (2003)
4. Glasgow College, UESTC (with University of Glasgow, UK, 2013)
5. UESTC - University of Montpellier Confucius Institute (France, 2013)
6. UESTC - KTH Joint Master's Programs on SoC (Sweden, 2016)

== Campus ==
UESTC now has three main campuses in Chengdu—Qingshuihe, Shahe and Jiulidi, occupying a total of 16.6 km² (4100 acres). There are many affiliated institutes outside of Chengdu.

== Notable alumni ==
- Sun Yafang, Chairwoman, Huawei
- Ding Lei, Chairman, NetEase
- Yisa Yu, Singer
- Robert Qiu - electrical engineer and entrepreneur

== See also ==
- Photonic Sensors, international journal, University co-published
- School of Medicine of UESTC
