= Shimen station =

Beijing Subway station

Shimen 石门
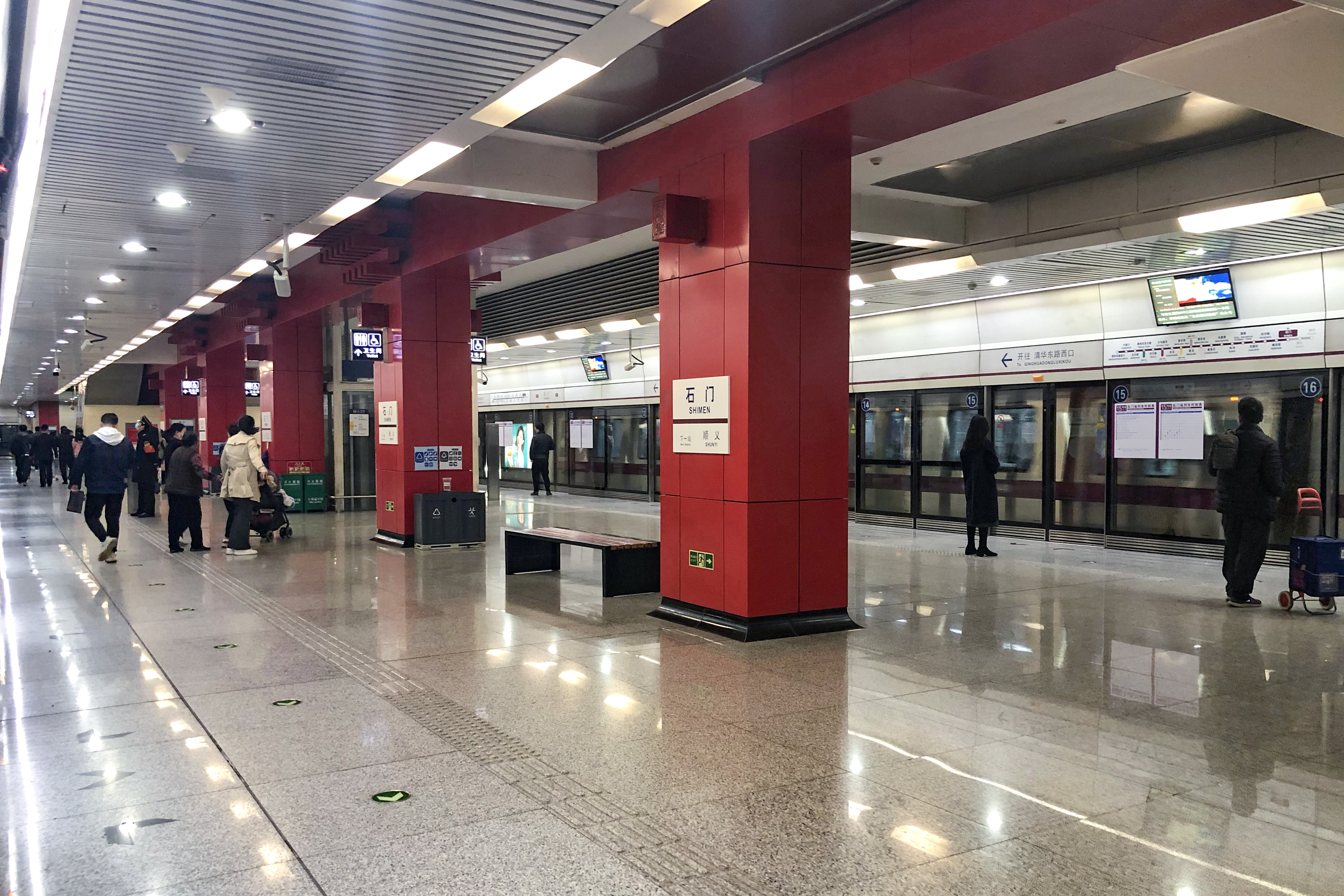
- Platform

General information
- Location: Shunyi District, Beijing; China
- Coordinates: 40°07′47″N 116°38′28″E
- Operator: Beijing Mass Transit Railway Operation Corporation Limited
- Line: Line 15
- Platforms: 2 (1 island platform)
- Tracks: 2
- Connections: Shunyi railway station (BCR)

Construction
- Structure type: Underground
- Accessible: Yes

History
- Opened: December 31, 2011; 14 years ago

Services
Preceding station	Beijing Subway	Following station
Nanfaxin towards Qinghua Donglu Xikou	Line 15	Shunyi towards Fengbo
Location
- Location within Beijing

Shimen Station (simplified Chinese: 石门站; traditional Chinese: 石門站; pinyin: Shímén Zhàn) is a station on Line 15 of the Beijing Subway.

== Station layout ==
The station has an underground island platform.

== Exits ==
There are 4 exits, lettered A, B, C, and D. Exit B is accessible.
