= Nanfaxin station =

Beijing Subway station

Nanfaxin 南法信
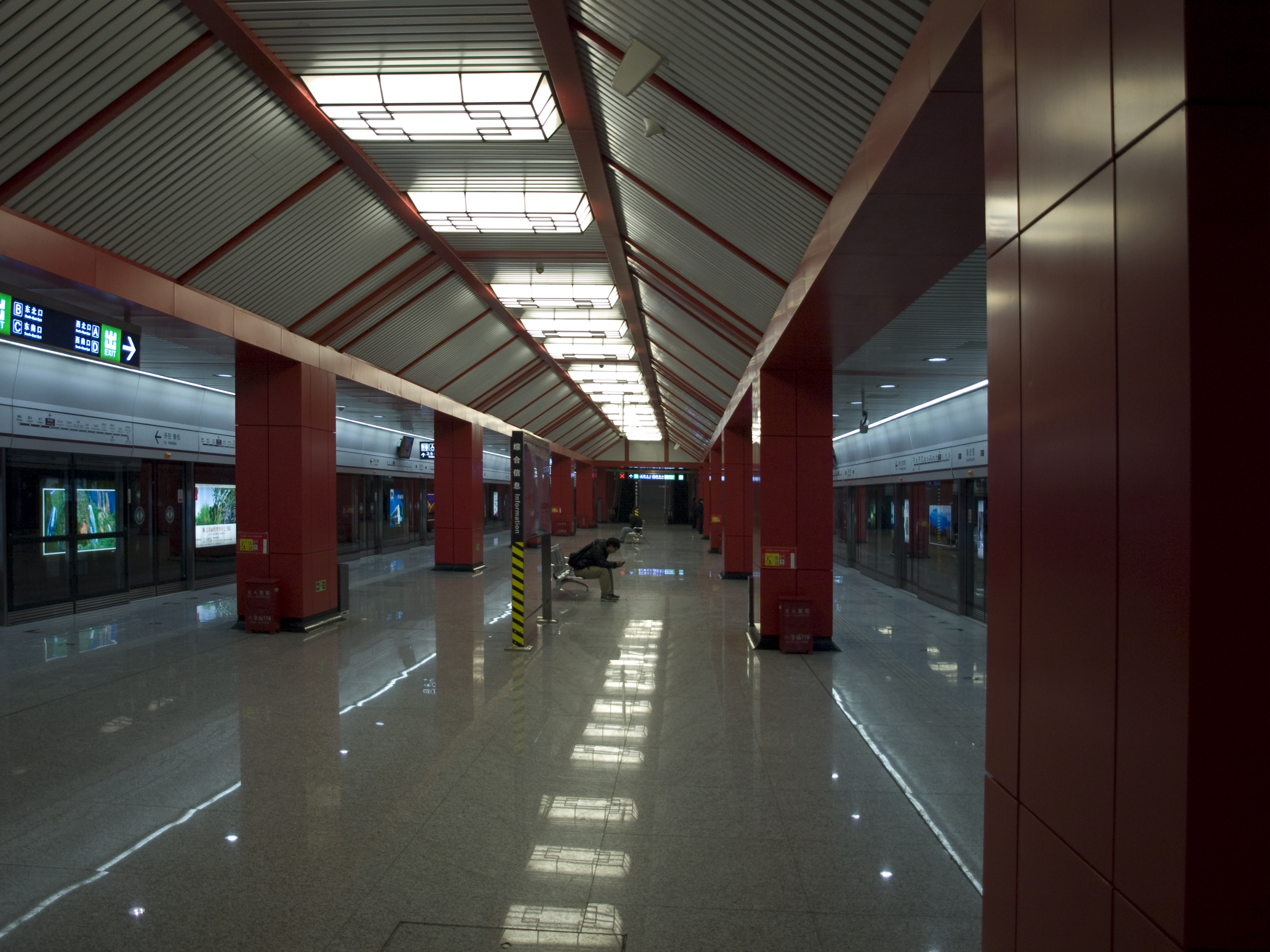
- Platform

General information
- Location: Shunyu Road (顺于路); Nanfaxin, Shunyi District, Beijing; China
- Coordinates: 40°07′43″N 116°36′34″E
- Operator: Beijing Mass Transit Railway Operation Corporation Limited
- Line: Line 15
- Platforms: 2 (1 island platform)
- Tracks: 2

Construction
- Structure type: Underground
- Accessible: Yes

History
- Opened: December 31, 2011; 14 years ago

Services
| Preceding station | Beijing Subway | Following station |
|---|---|---|
| Houshayu towards Qinghua Donglu Xikou | Line 15 | Shimen towards Fengbo |
Location
- Location within Beijing

Nanfaxin Station (Chinese: 南法信站; pinyin: Nánfǎxìn Zhàn) is a station on Line 15 of the Beijing Subway.

== Station layout ==
The station has an underground island platform.

== Exits ==
There are 4 exits, lettered A, B, C, and D. Exit B is accessible.
