= Cuigezhuang station =

Beijing Subway station

Cuigezhuang 崔各庄
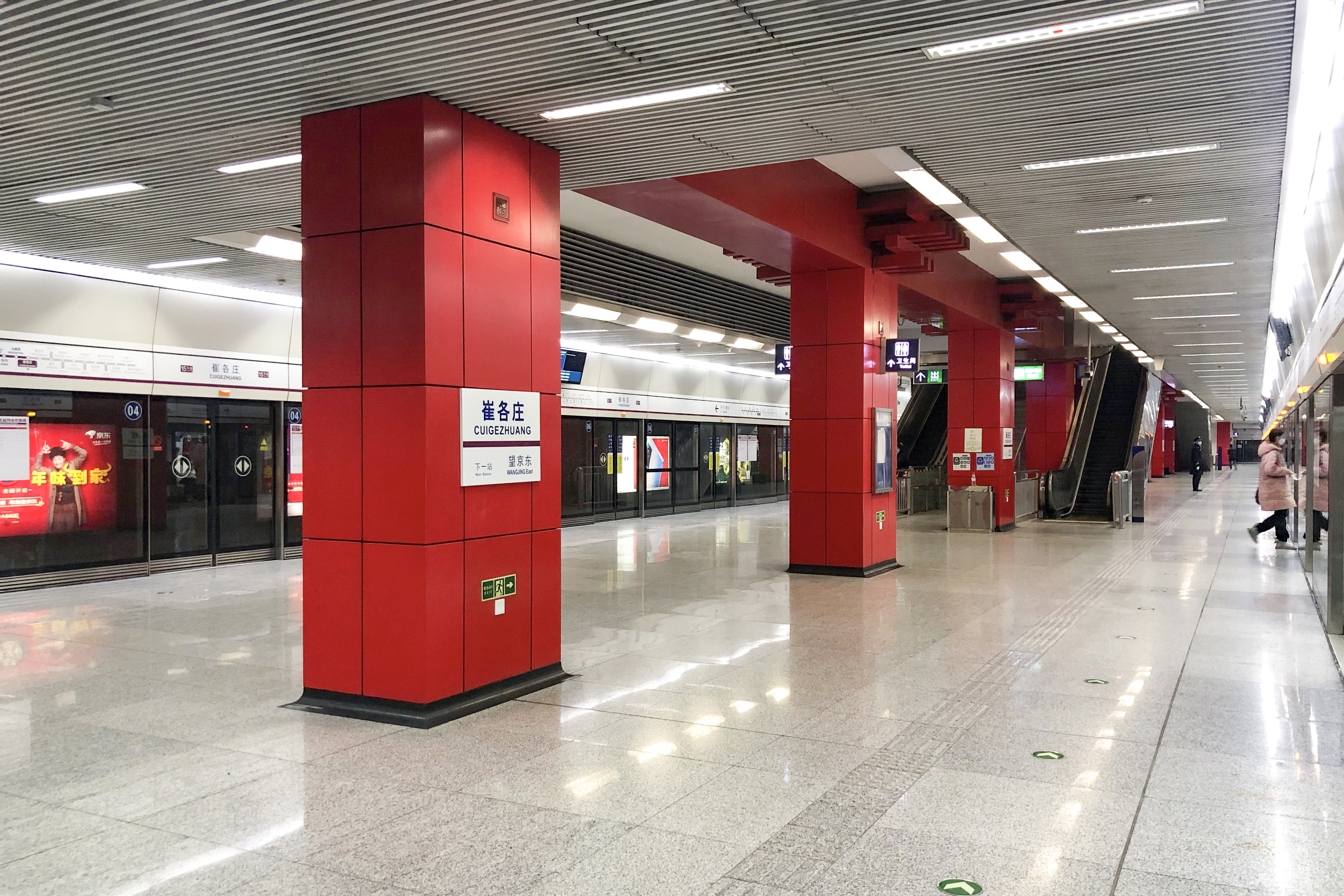
- Platform

General information
- Location: East Laiguangying Road (来广营东路) at Dongxindian Road (东辛店路); Chaoyang District, Beijing; China
- Coordinates: 40°01′20″N 116°29′35″E
- Operator: Beijing Mass Transit Railway Operation Corporation Limited
- Line: Line 15
- Platforms: 2 (1 island platform)
- Tracks: 2

Construction
- Structure type: Underground
- Accessible: Yes

History
- Opened: December 30, 2010; 15 years ago

Services
Preceding station	Beijing Subway	Following station
Wangjingdong towards Qinghua Donglu Xikou	Line 15	Maquanying towards Fengbo
Location
- Location within Beijing

Cuigezhuang Station (simplified Chinese: 崔各庄站; traditional Chinese: 崔各莊站; pinyin: Cuīgèzhuāng Zhàn) is a station on Line 15 of the Beijing Subway.

== Station layout ==
The station has an underground island platform.

== Exits ==
There are 2 exits, lettered B and D. Exit B is accessible and has connections to Beijing Bus Routes 944, 991, 415 and 专116.
