= China Int'l Exhibition Center station =

Beijing Subway station

China Int'l Exhibition Center 国展
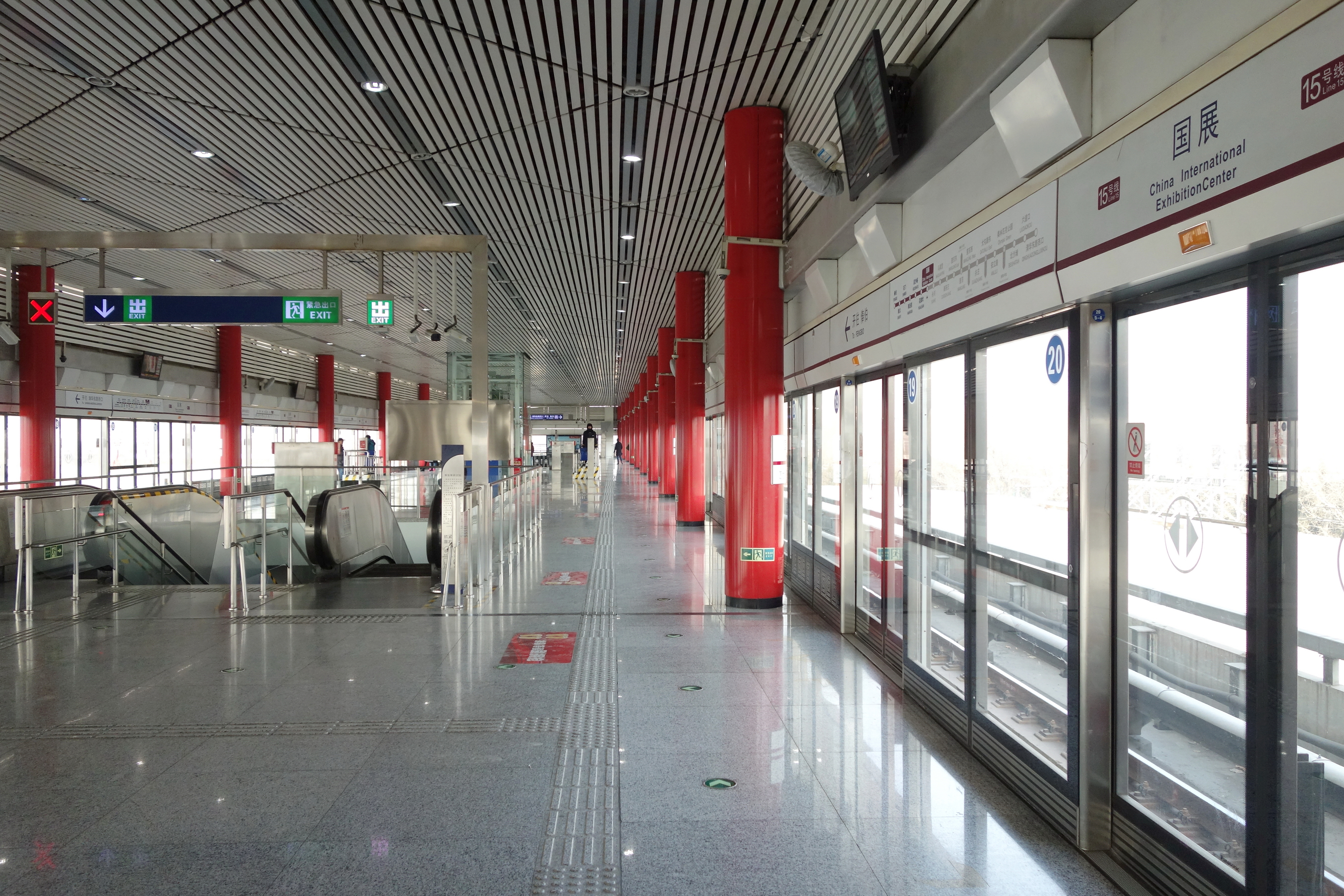
- Platform

General information
- Location: National Highway 101 (Jingmi Road) north of Tianbei Road (天北路); Shunyi District, Beijing; China
- Coordinates: 40°04′12″N 116°33′18″E
- Operator: Beijing Mass Transit Railway Operation Corporation Limited
- Line: Line 15
- Platforms: 2 (1 island platform)
- Tracks: 2

Construction
- Structure type: Elevated
- Accessible: Yes

History
- Opened: December 30, 2010; 15 years ago

Services
Preceding station	Beijing Subway	Following station
Sunhe towards Qinghua Donglu Xikou	Line 15	Hualikan towards Fengbo
Location
- Location within Beijing

China Int'l Exhibition Center station (simplified Chinese: 国展站; traditional Chinese: 國展站; pinyin: Guózhǎn zhàn) is a station on Line 15 of the Beijing Subway in Shunyi District, located along National Highway 101 (Jingmi Road) to the east of the eponymous China International Exhibition Center (中国国际展览中心).

== Station layout ==
The station has an elevated island platform. There are 4 exits, lettered A, B, C, and D.

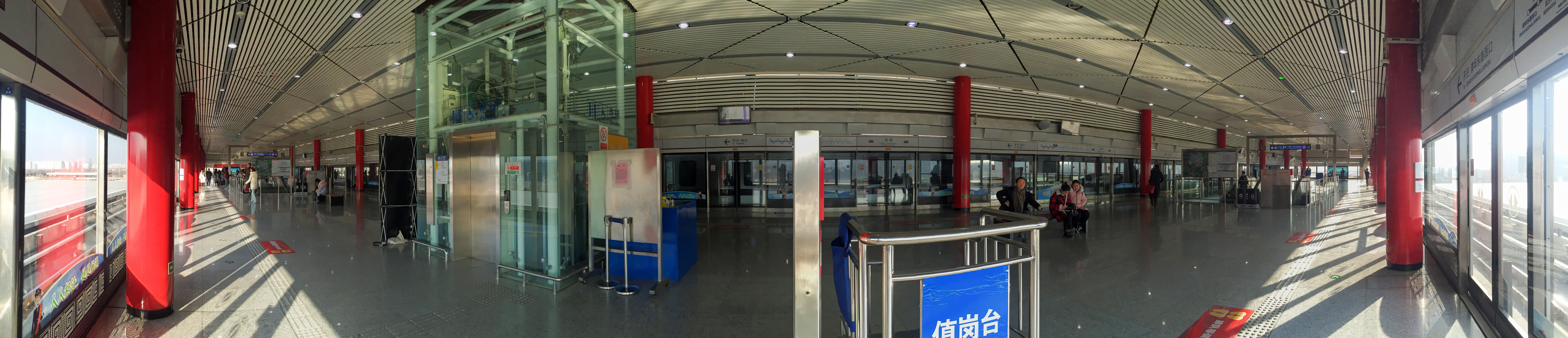
Platform panorama (January 2018)

== Gallery ==
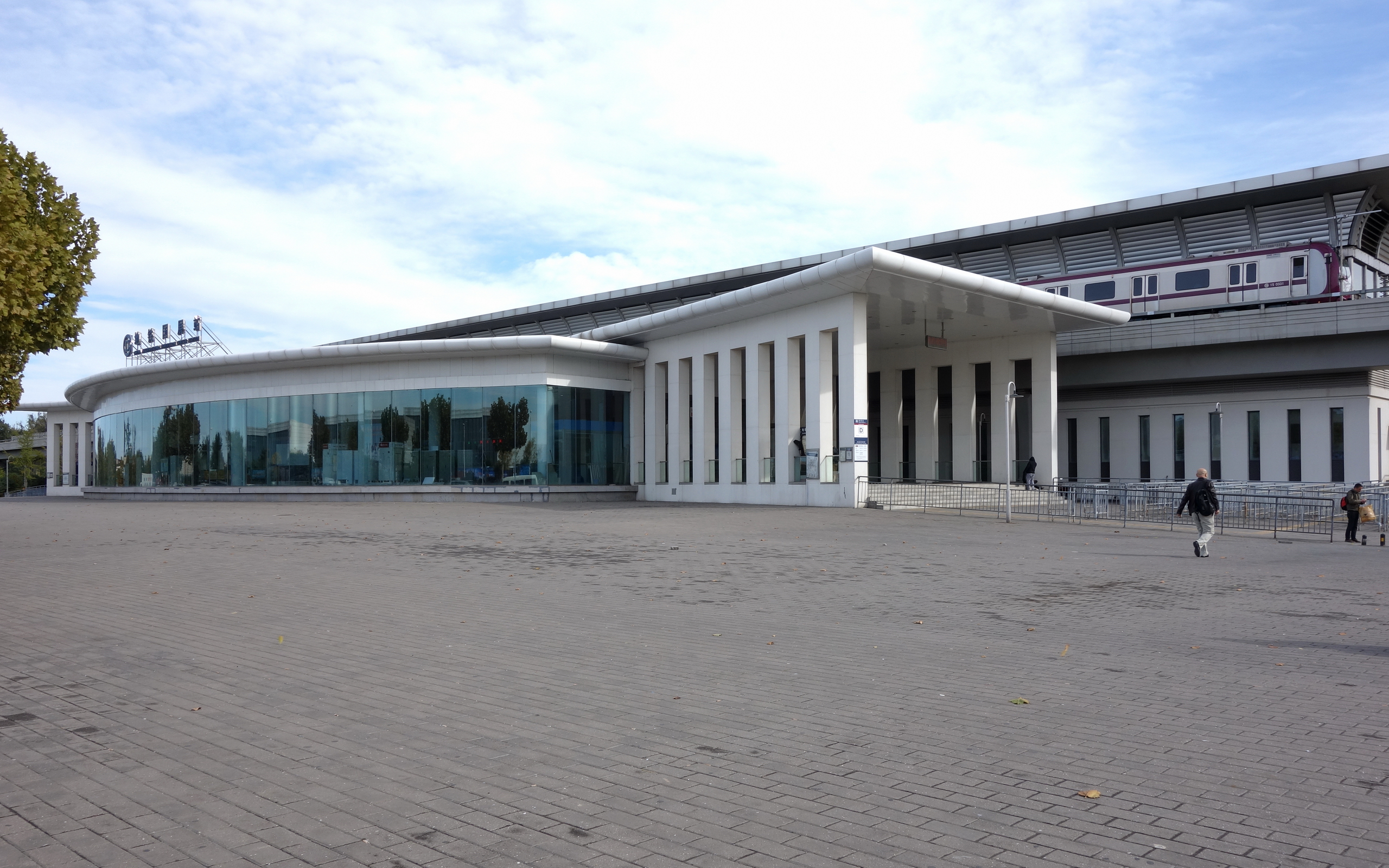
Square outside CIEC station (2016)

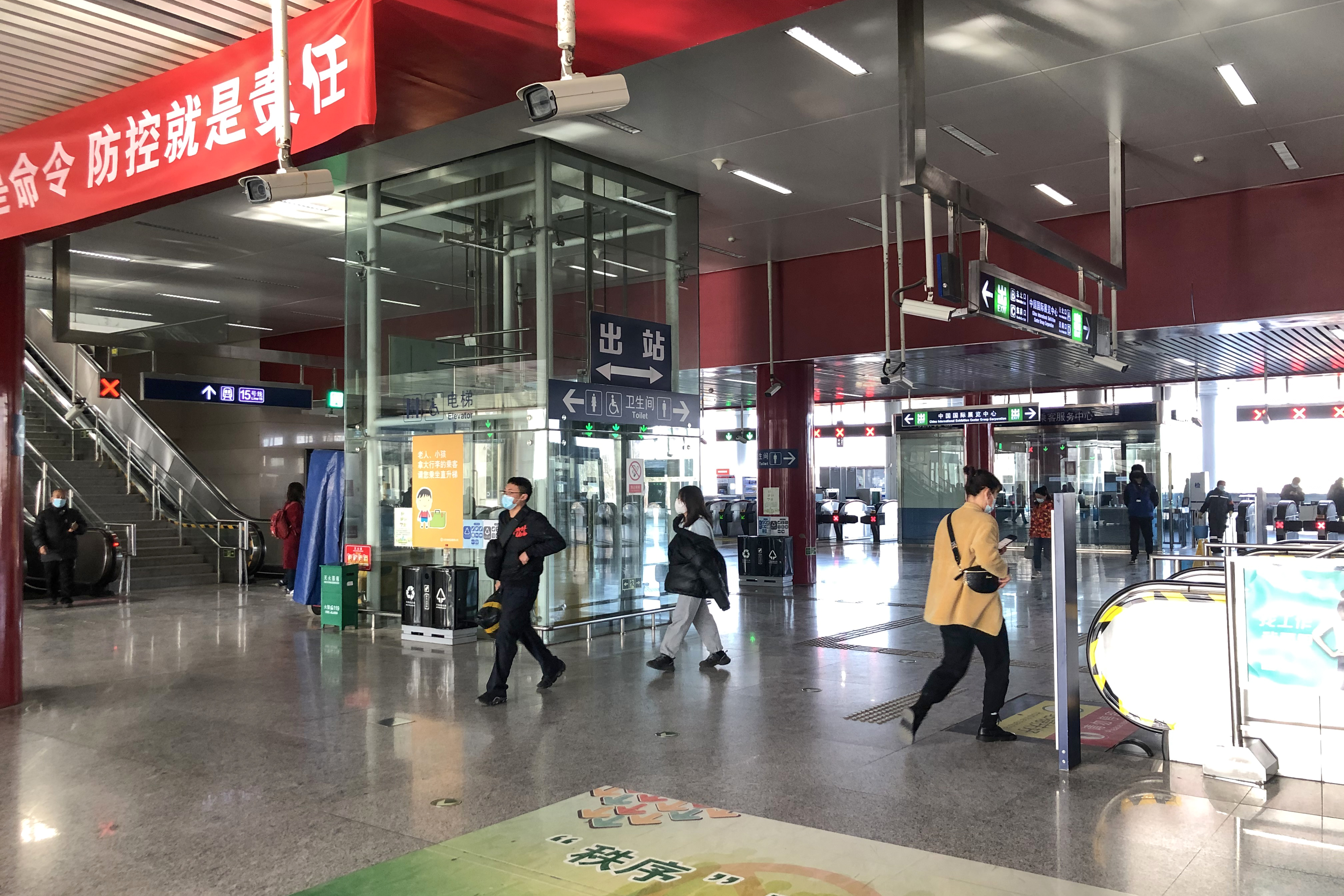
Concourse

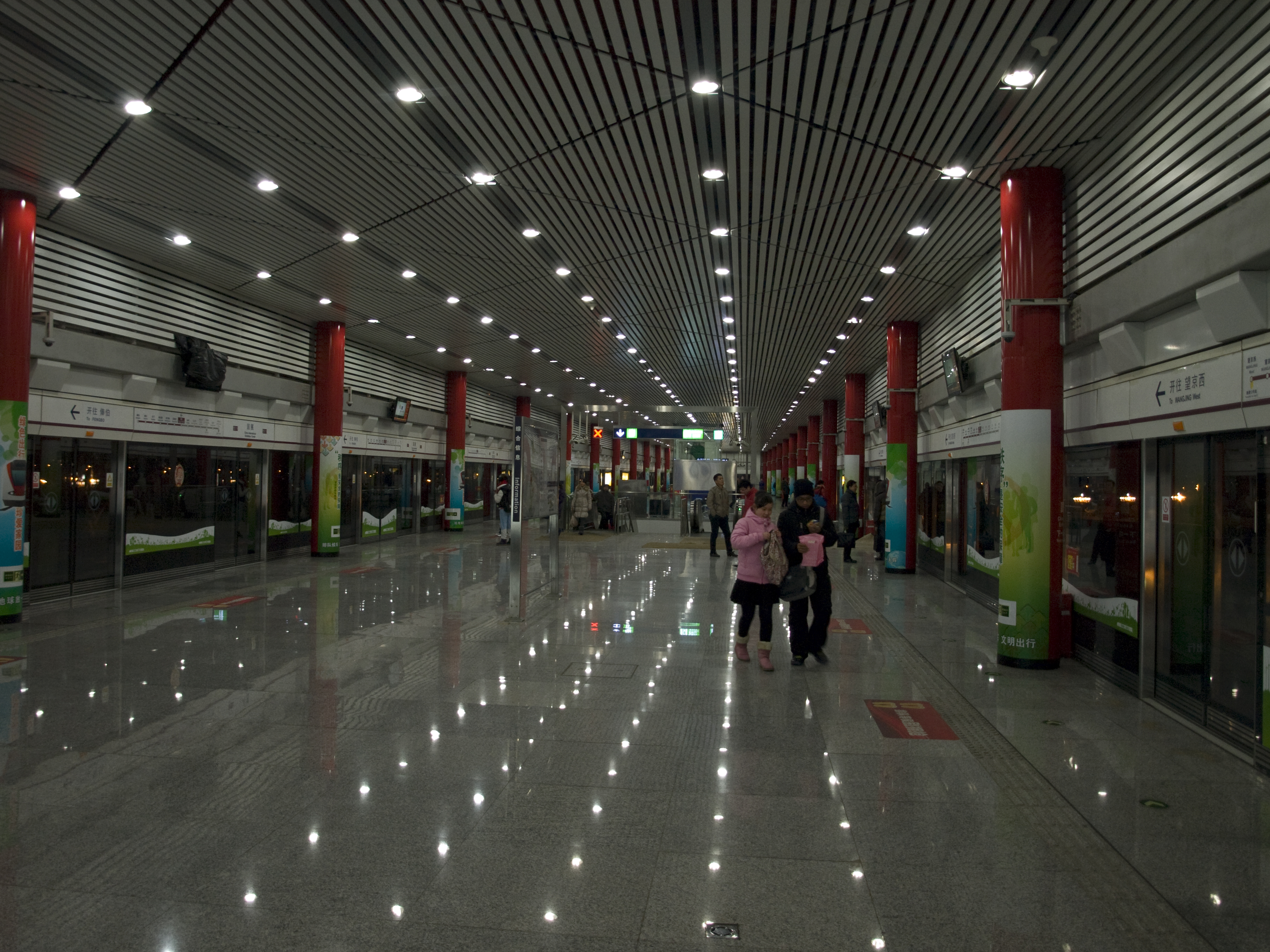
Platform
