= 015 =

015 may refer to:

- 015, a telephone number code in Malaysia
- Global Underground 015, DJ mix album by Darren Emerson
- The Haunting of Tram Car 015, 2019 novella by P. Djèlí Clark
- JWH-015, chemical from the synthetic cannabinoid family
- Korean Air Lines Flight 015, an airplane that crashed while attempting to land in 1980
- ONYX-015, experimental virus engineered to treat cancer
- Road FC 015, 2014 Mixed Martial Arts event
- Tyrrell 015, a Formula One car

== See also ==
- 15 (disambiguation)
