= Wangjingxi station =

Beijing Subway Line 13, Line 15 and Line 17 station

Wangjingxi 望京西
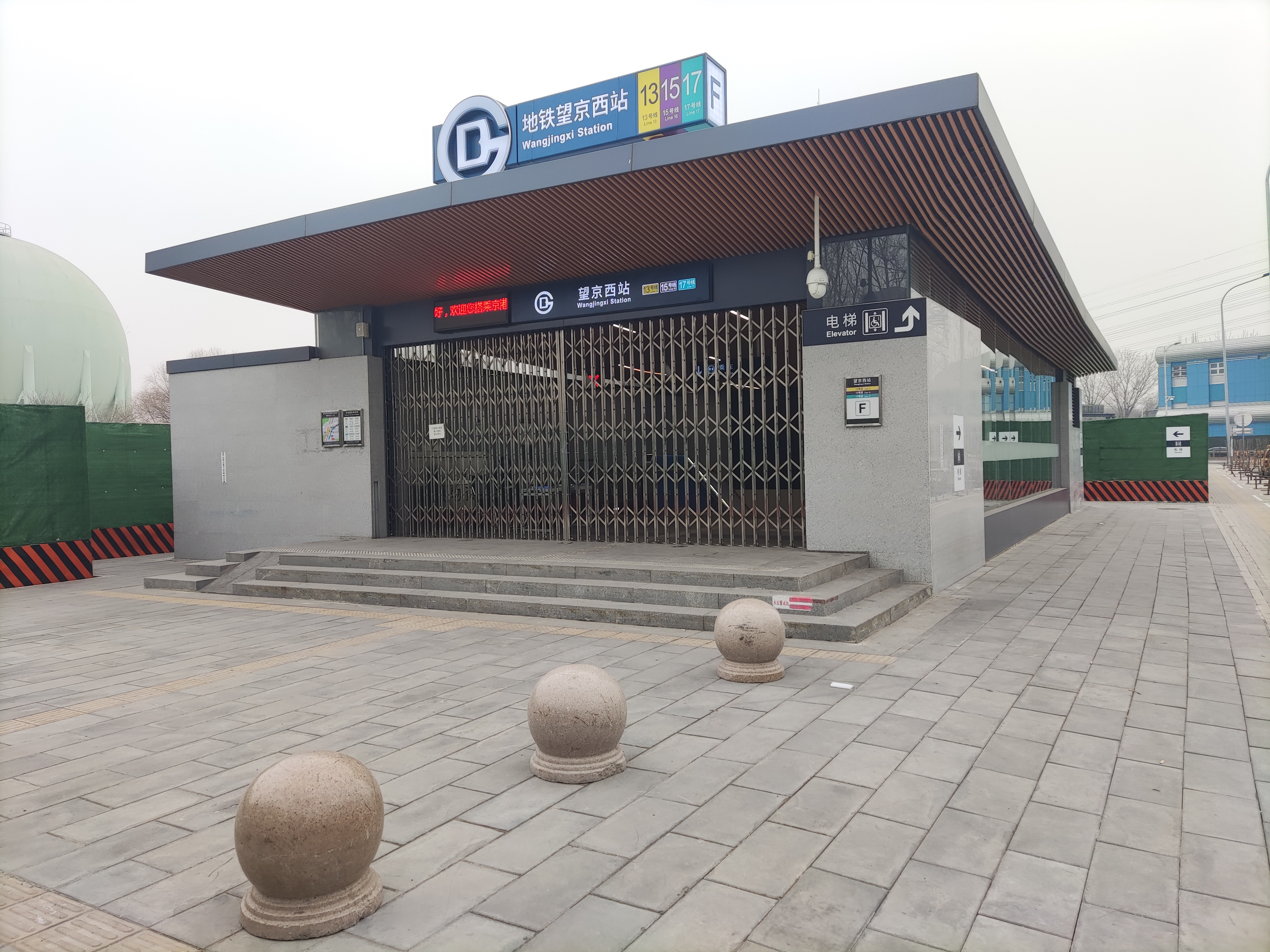
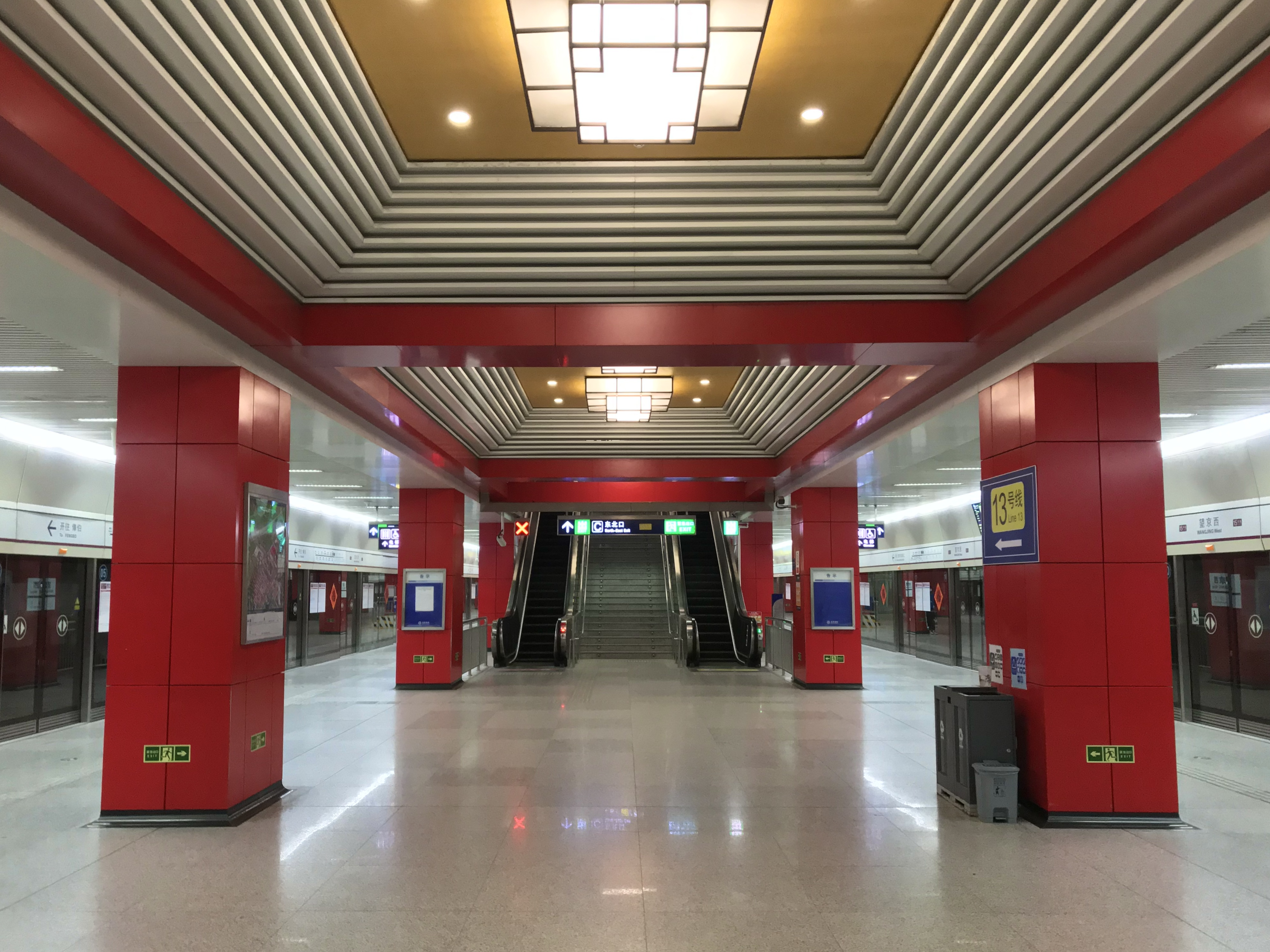
- Exit F, Line 17 (January 2026) Line 15 platform

General information
- Location: Interchange of Jingcheng Expressway and Jiangzhuang Road (姜庄路); Chaoyang District, Beijing; China
- Coordinates: 39°59′45″N 116°27′00″E
- Operator: Beijing Mass Transit Railway Operation Corporation Limited (Lines 13 and 15); Beijing MTR (Line 17)
- Lines: Line 13; Line 15; Line 17
- Platforms: 6 (2 island platforms and 2 side platforms)
- Tracks: 6

Construction
- Structure type: At-grade (Line 13); Underground (Lines 15 & 17)
- Accessible: Yes

Other information
- Station code: 1312 (Line 13)

History
- Opened: Line 13: January 28, 2003; 23 years ago; Line 15: December 30, 2010; 15 years ago; Line 17: January 31, 2026; 6 months ago

Services
Preceding station	Beijing Subway	Following station
Bei Yuan towards Xizhimen	Line 13	Shaoyaoju towards Dongzhimen
Guanzhuang towards Qinghua Donglu Xikou	Line 15	Wangjing towards Fengbo
Hongjunying towards Weilaikexuechengbei (Future Science City North)	Line 17	Taiyanggong towards Jiahuihu
Location
- Location within Beijing

Wangjingxi station (Chinese: 望京西站; pinyin: Wàngjīngxī zhàn) is an interchange station between Lines 13, 15 and 17 on the Beijing Subway. It was the western terminus of Line 15 until it was extended west to Qinghua Donglu Xikou on December 28, 2014.

== History ==
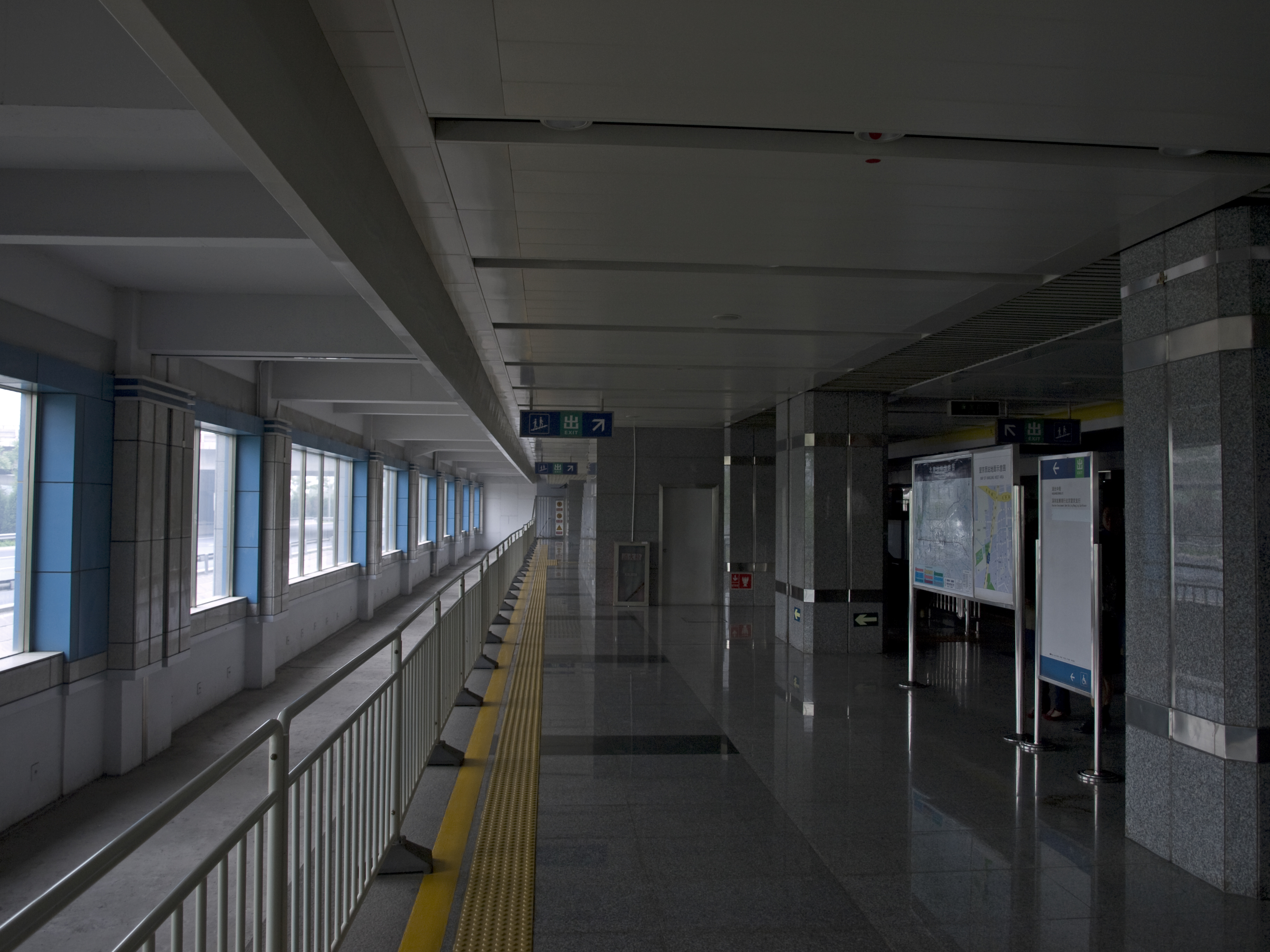
Original dual-island line 13 platforms in May 2010. These platforms are filled up now.

Wangjingxi was originally going to be the terminus for the Capital Airport Express, so when the station was built in 2003, it was designed with dual-island platforms. Due to the Capital Airport Express instead terminating at Dongzhimen, the reserved platforms for the Capital Airport Express were never used and track was never laid down. In late 2010, the unused tracks were filled when line 15 started serving the station.

On December 18, 2023, Beijing MTR announced that the Line 17 station will not open with the rest of the northern section of the line due to construction of the integrated transport hub. The station opened on January 31, 2026.

== Station layout ==
The line 13 station has 2 at-grade side platforms. The line 15 and line 17 stations have underground island platforms.

== Exits ==
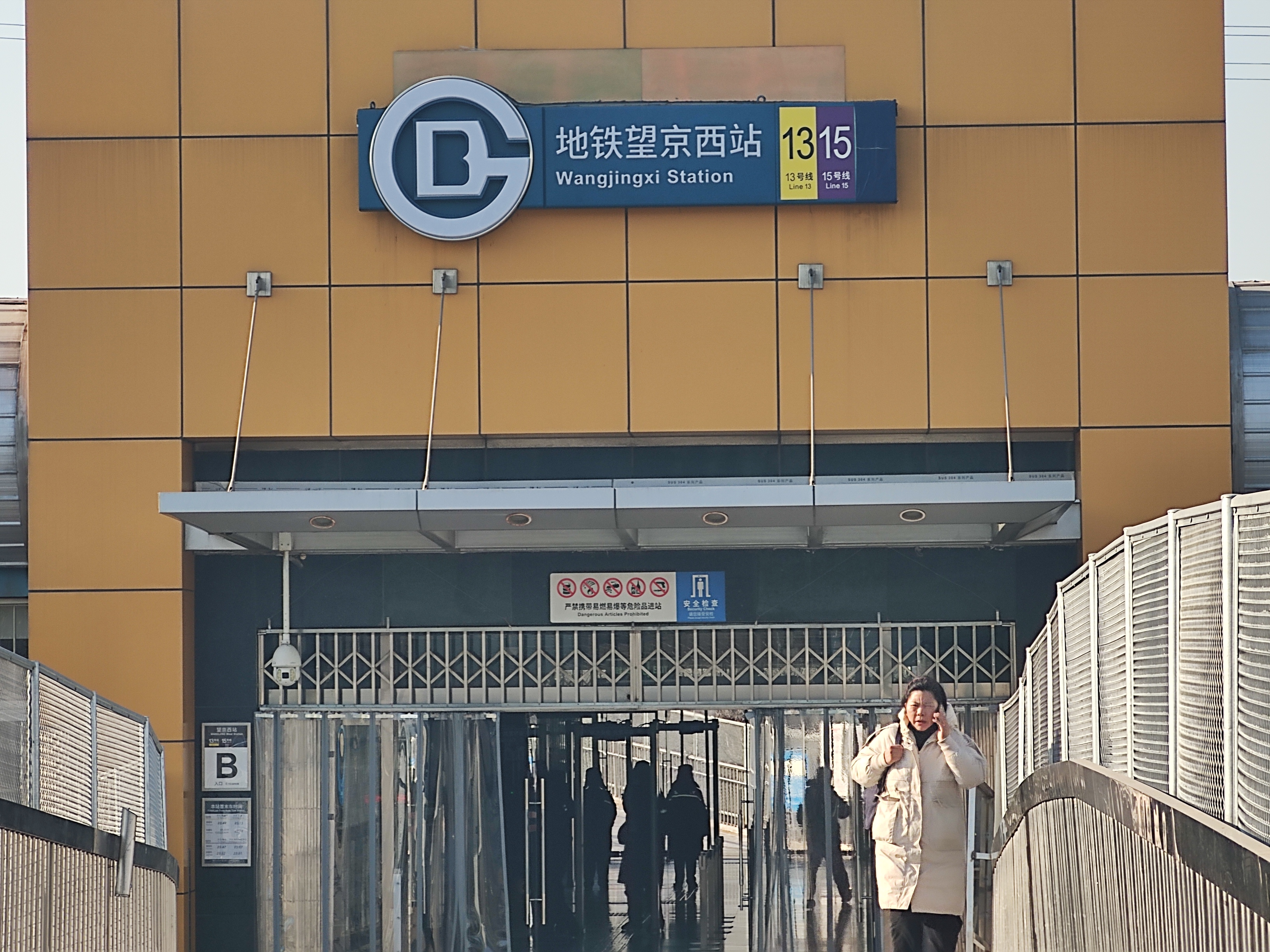
Exit B of Wangjingxi station, Line 13 (January 2026)

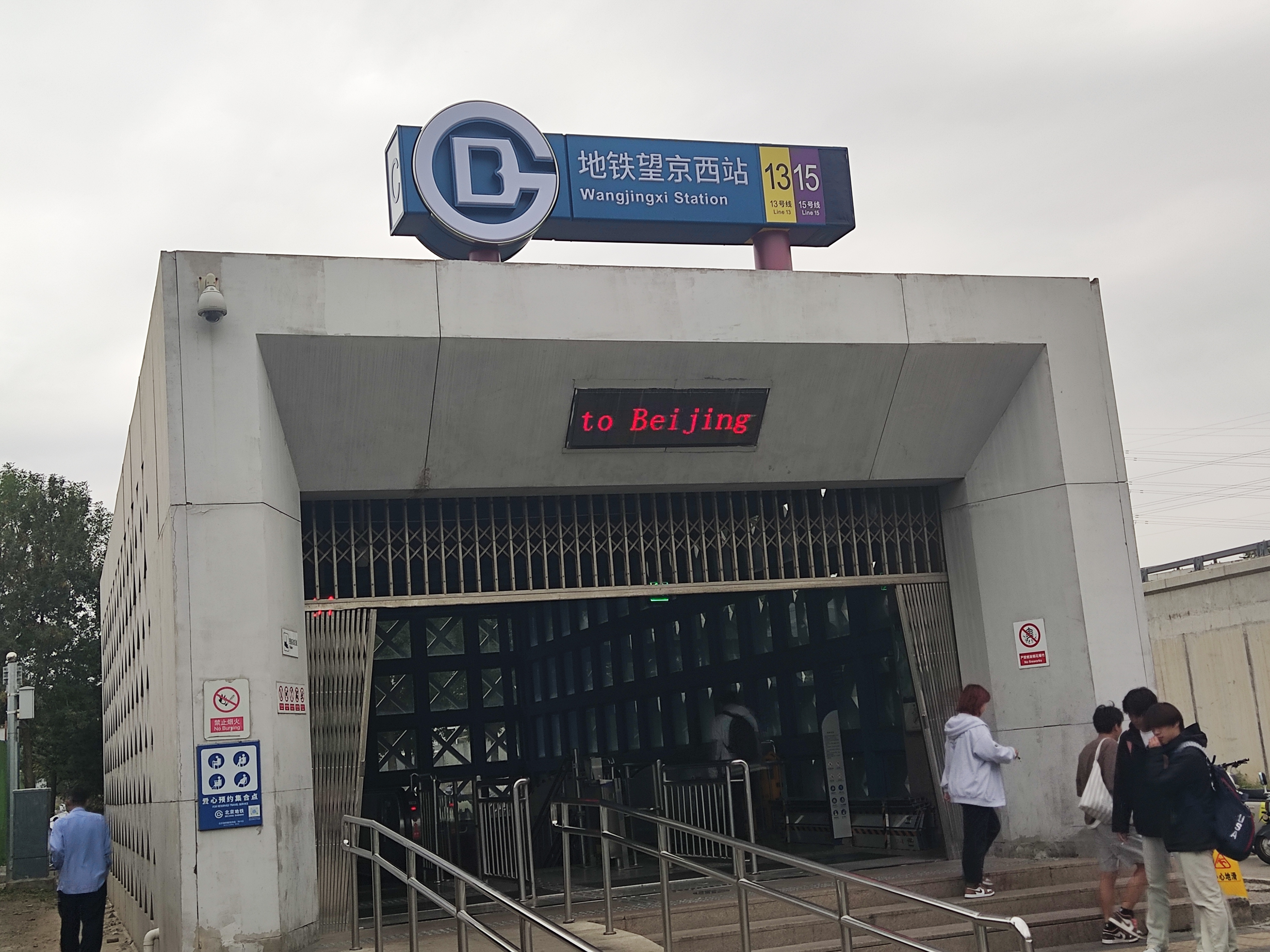
Exit C of Wangjingxi station, Line 15 (October 2025)

=== Line 13 ===
There are 2 exits, lettered A and B. Both exits are accessible via ramps.

=== Line 15 ===
There are 2 exits, lettered C and D. Exit C is accessible via a stairlift. Exit D is for exiting only.

=== Line 17 ===
There are 2 exits, lettered E and F. Exit E is accessible via ramps and Exit F is accessible via an elevator.

== Gallery ==
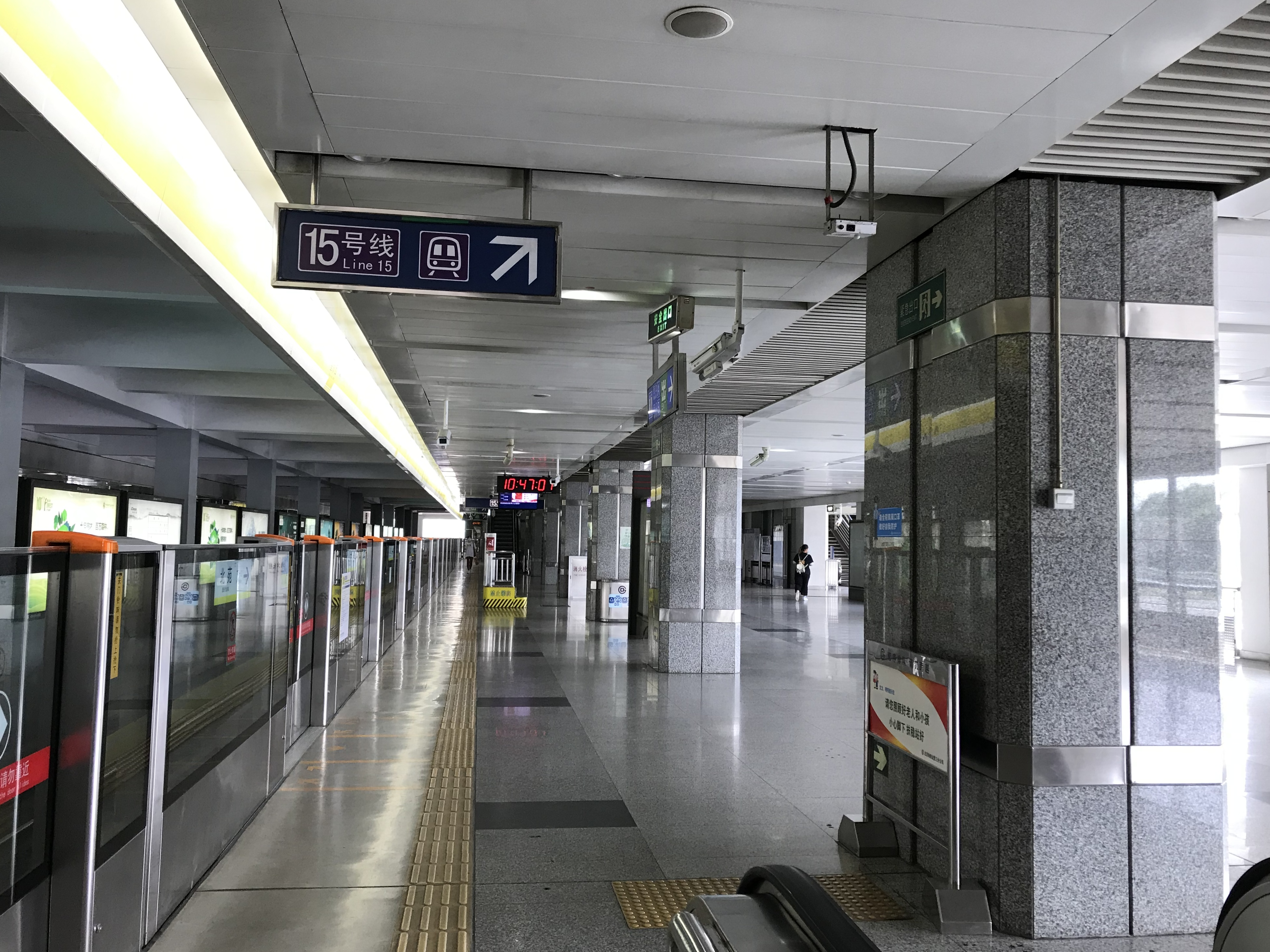
Line 13 northbound platform

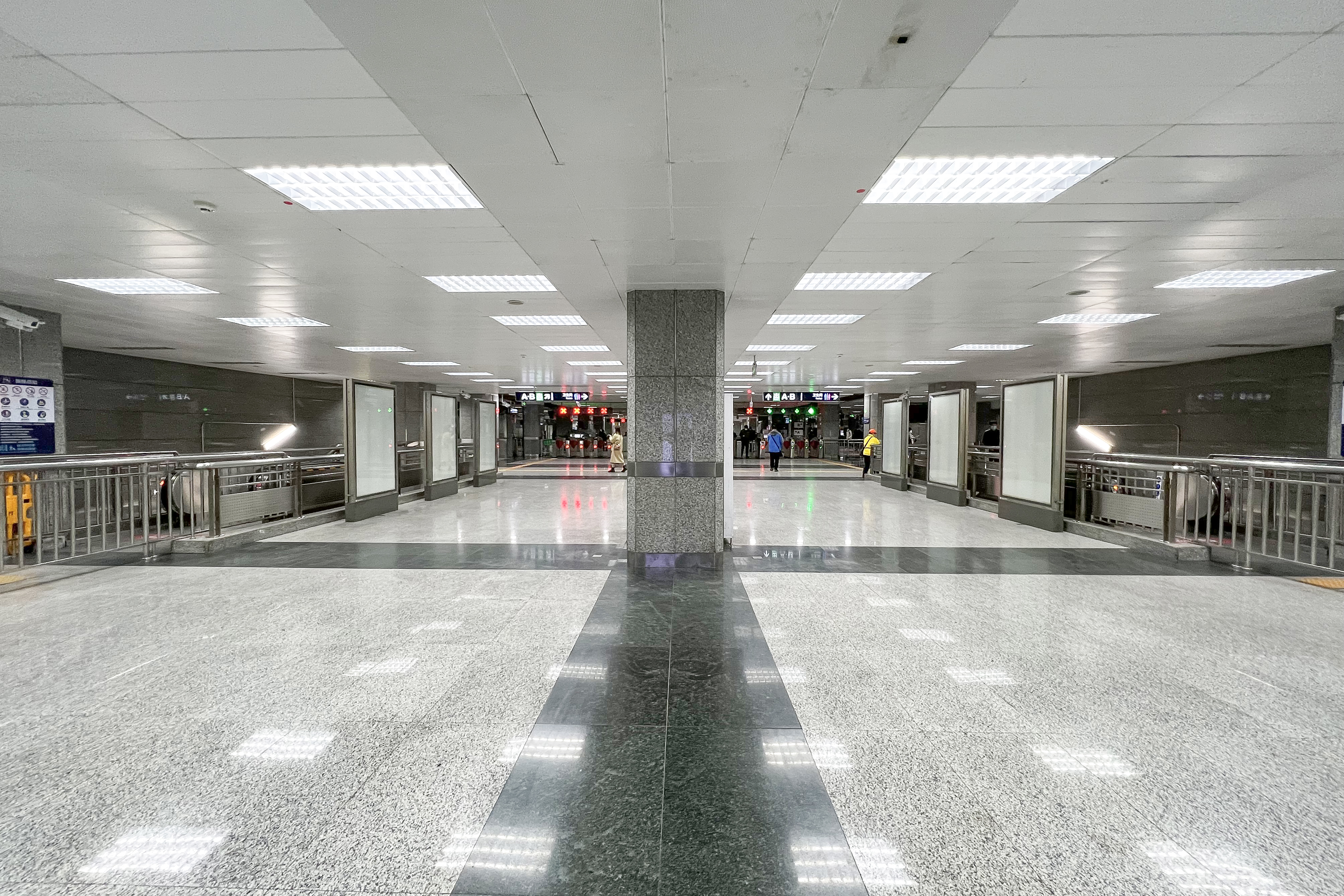
Line 13 concourse

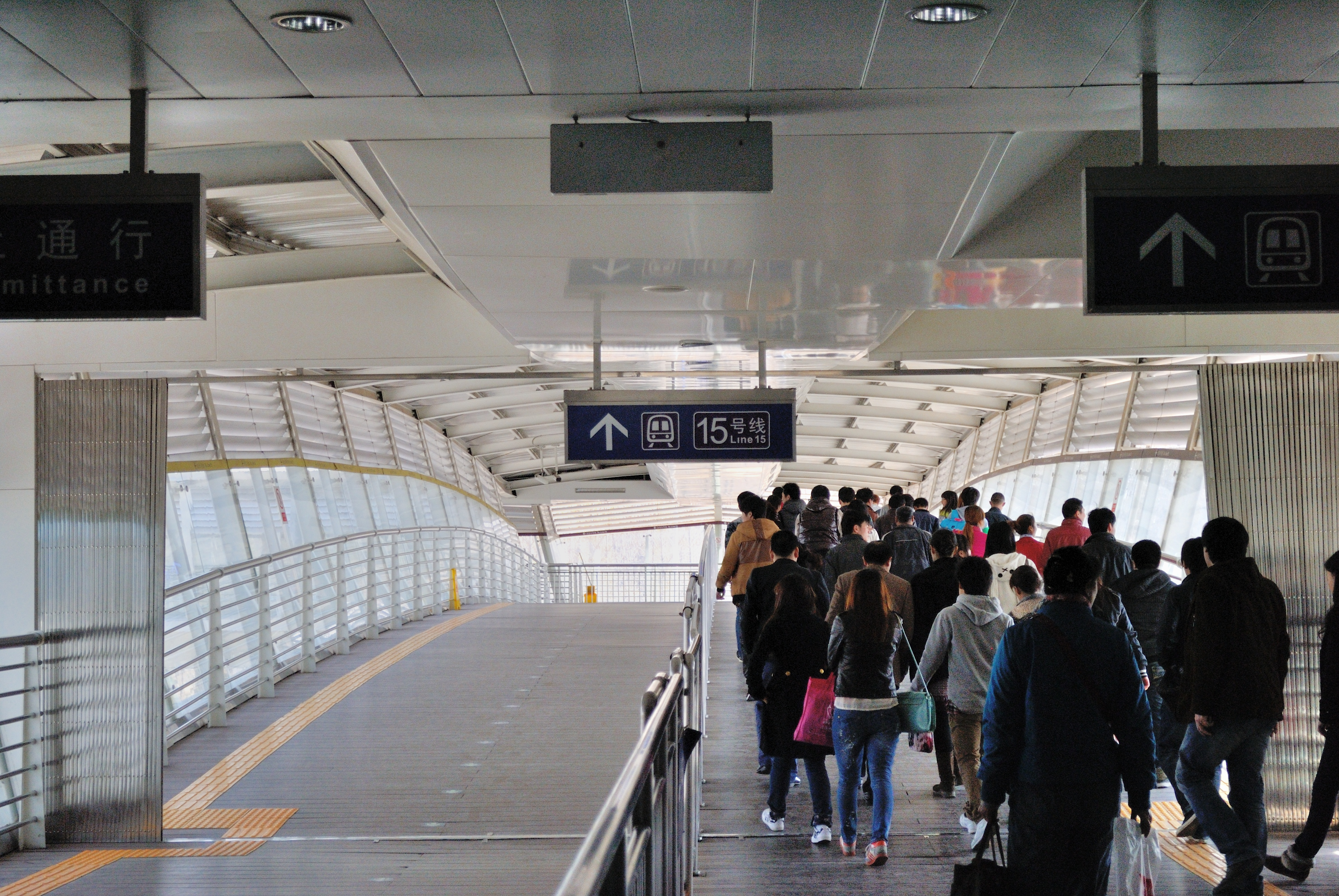
Interchange footbridge in the direction of Line 15

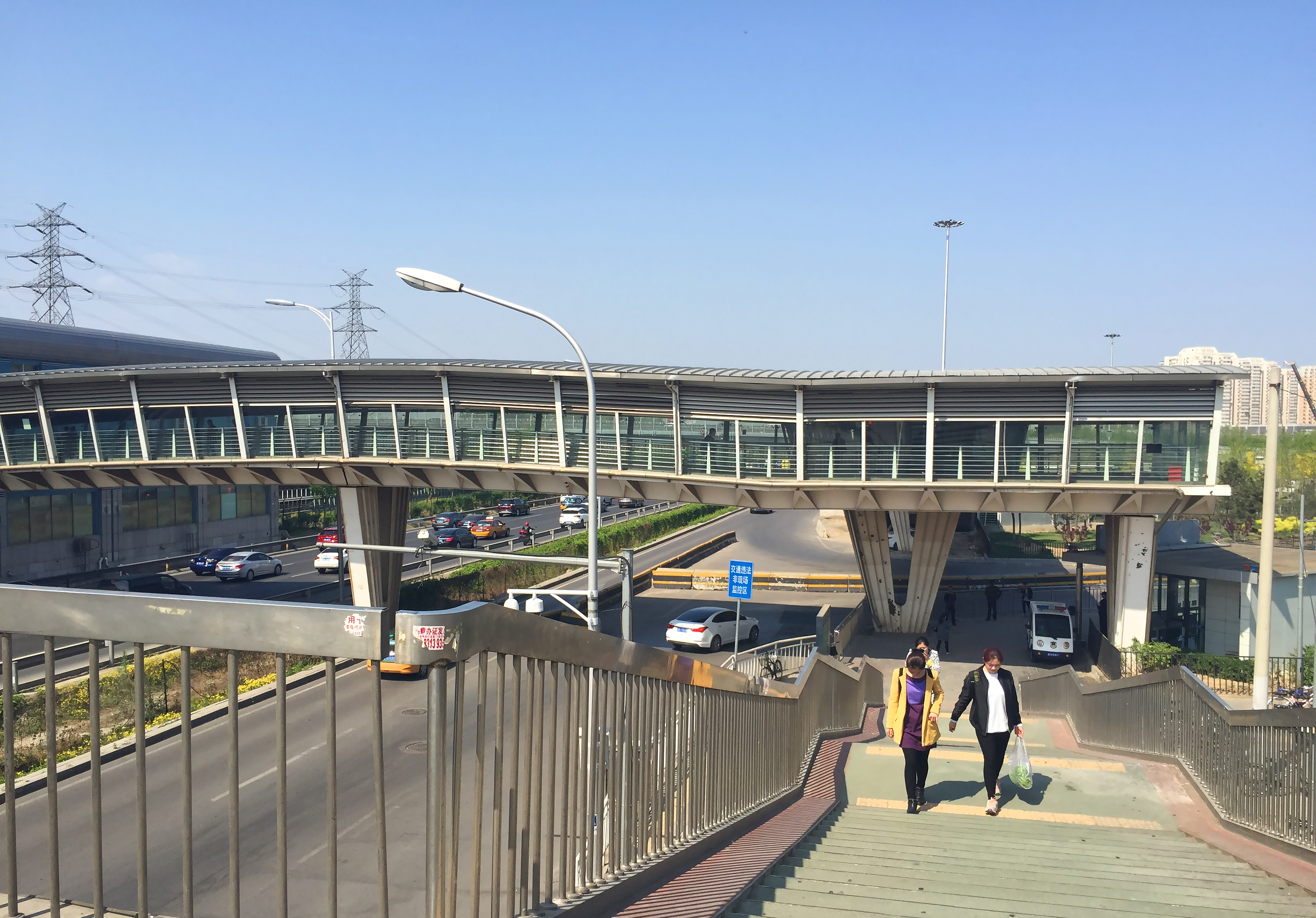
Interchange footbridge exterior

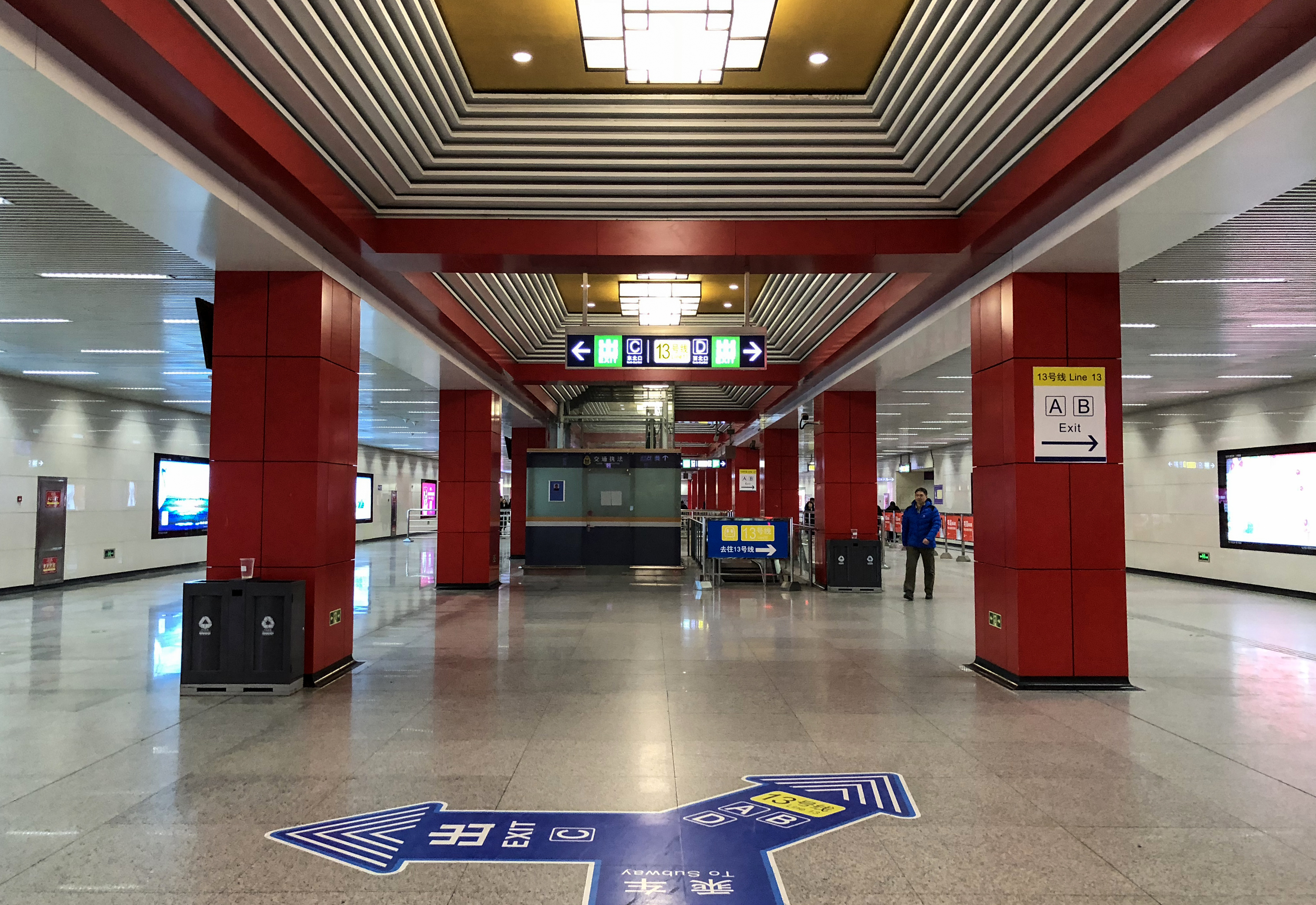
Line 15 concourse (March 2018)

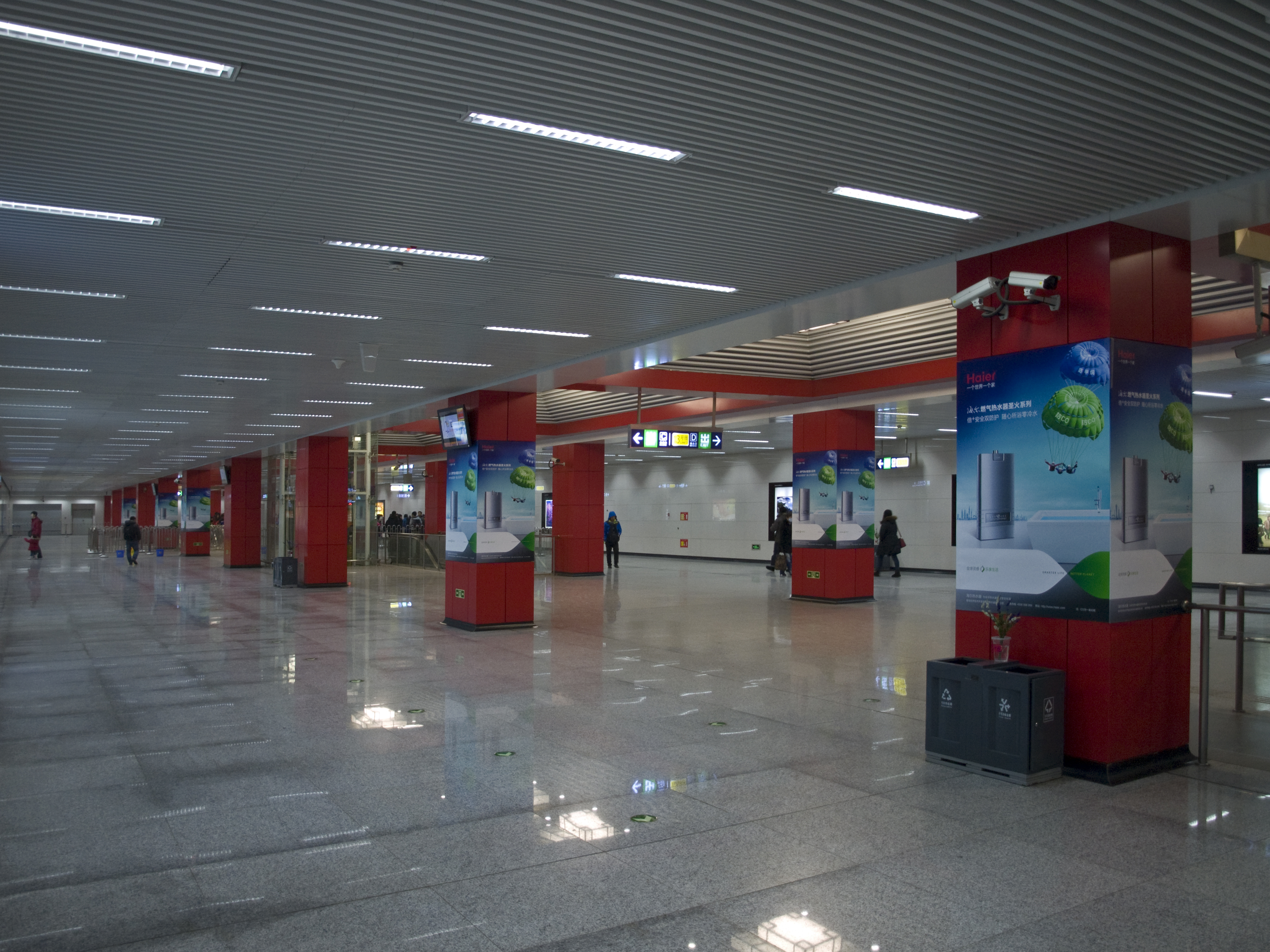
Line 15 concourse

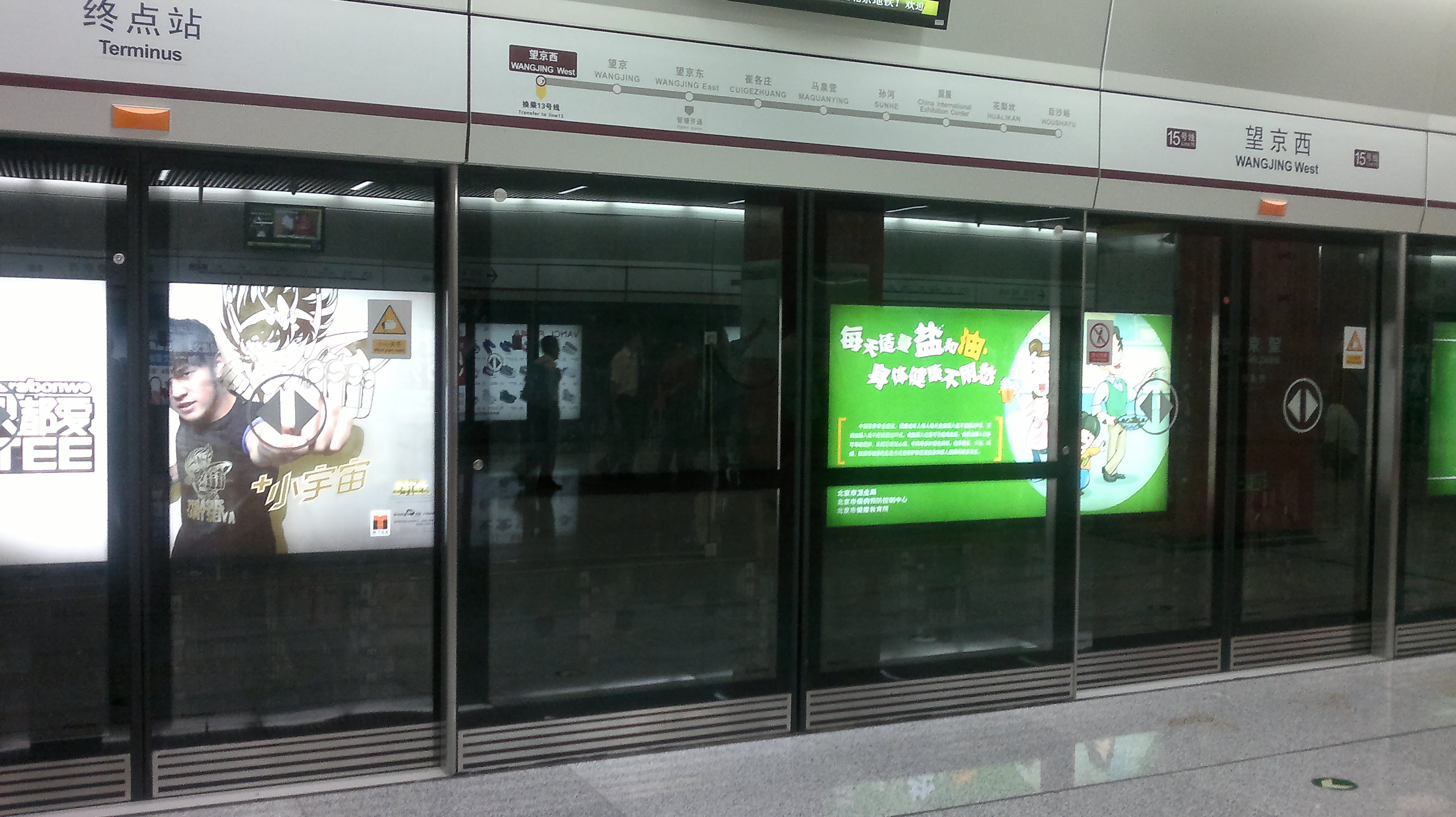
Line 15 platform

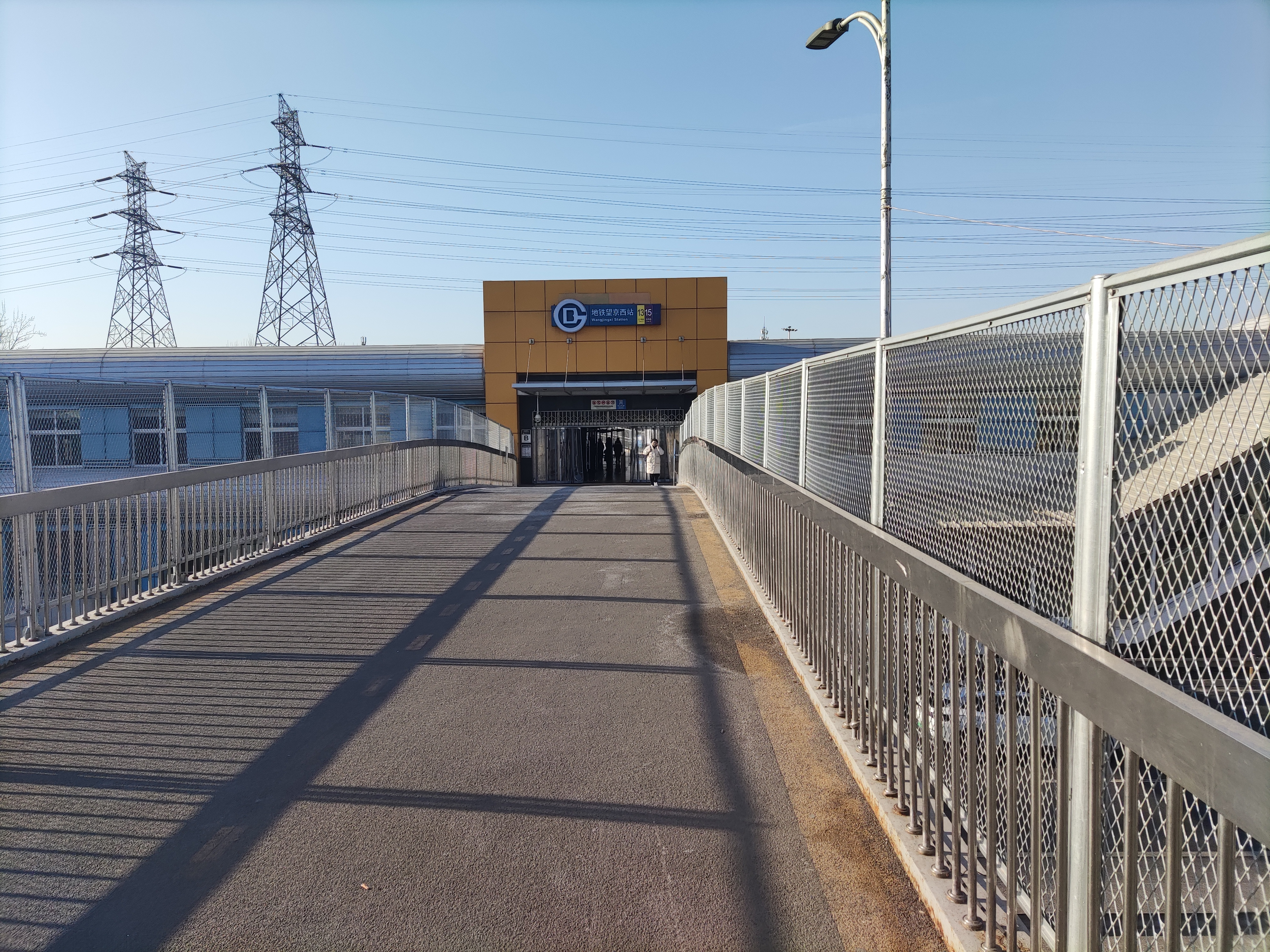
Wangjingxi Station, Line 13

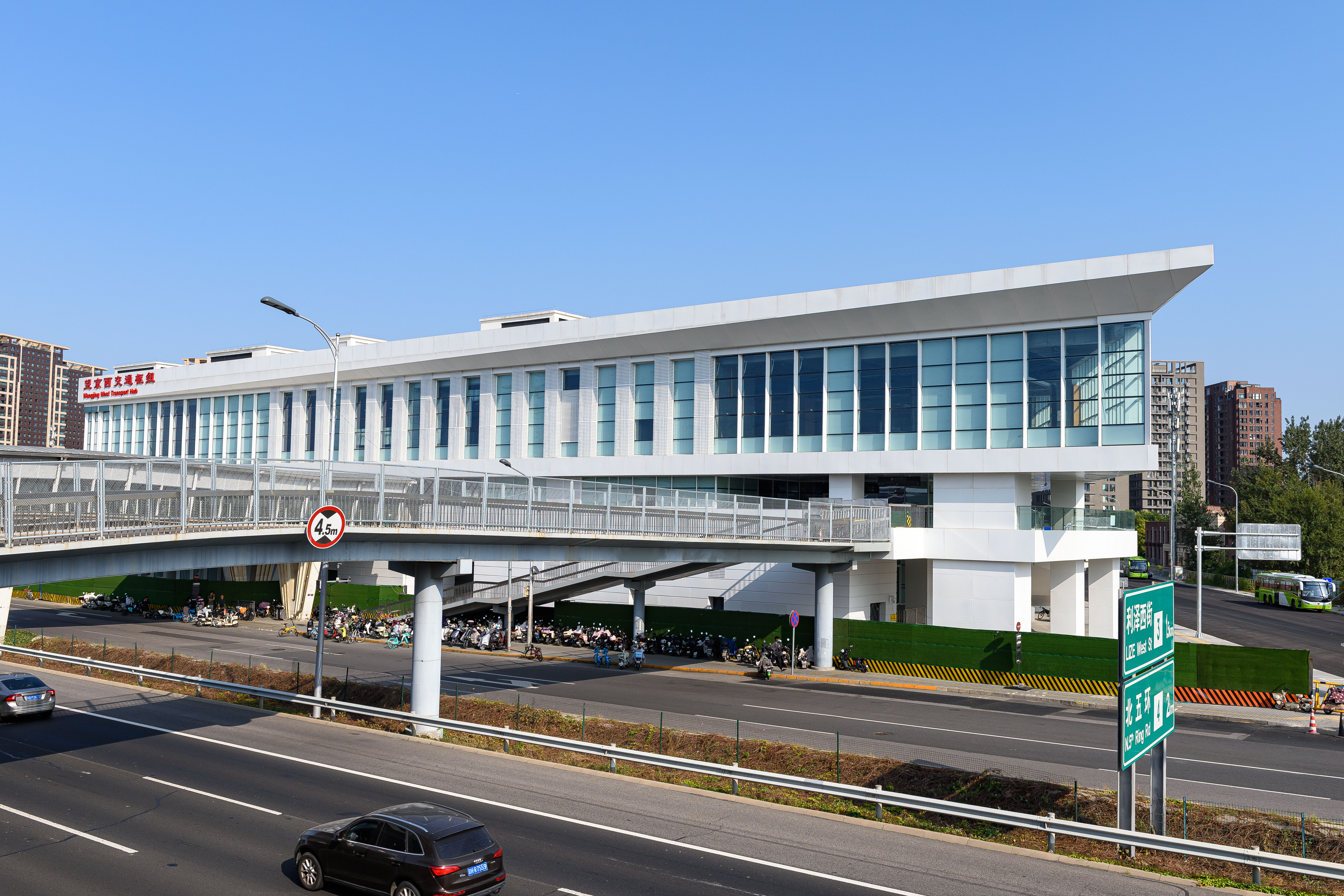
Transport hub (October 2025)

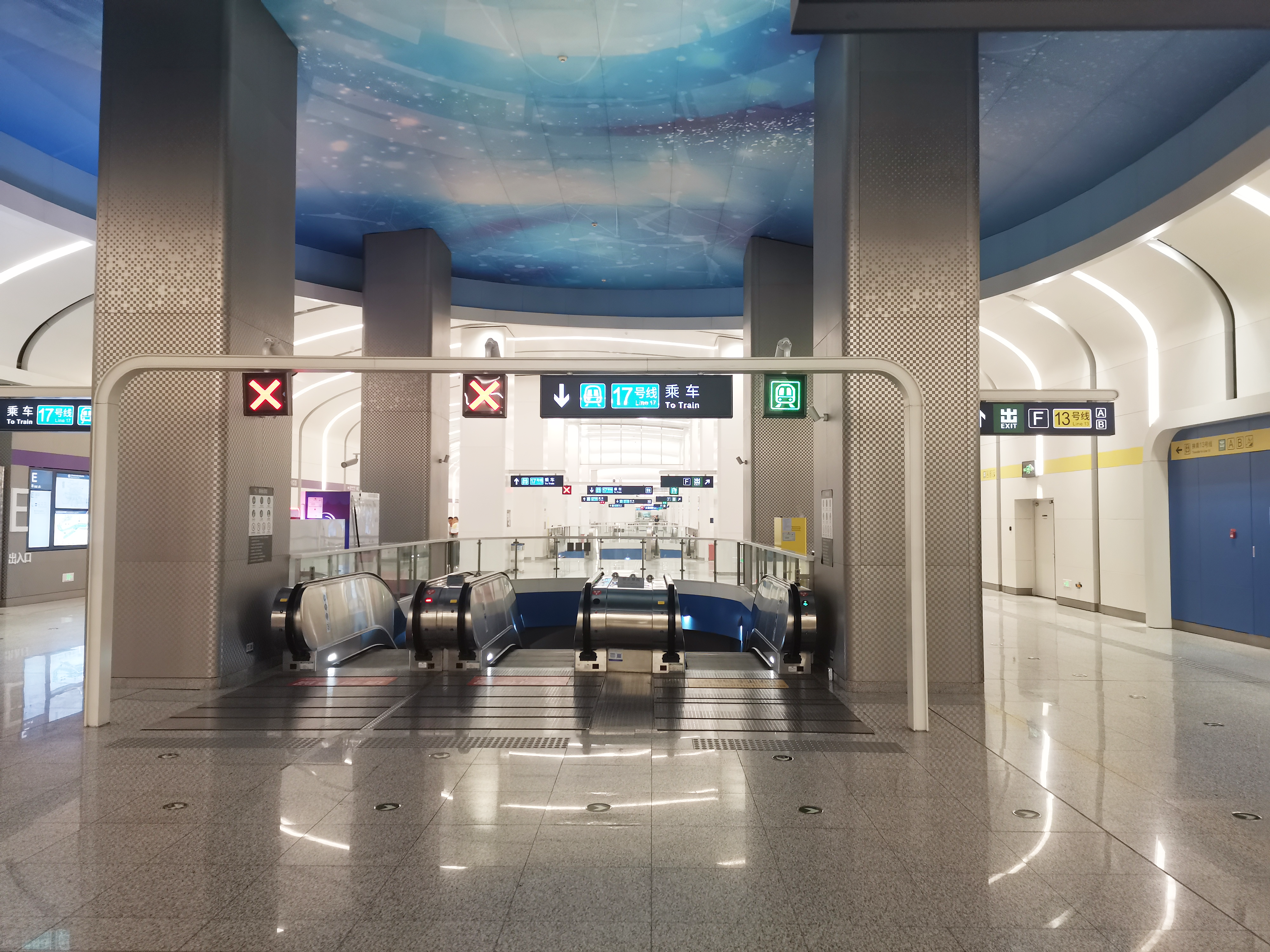
Line 17 concourse
