= Shunyi station =

Beijing Subway station

Shunyi 顺义
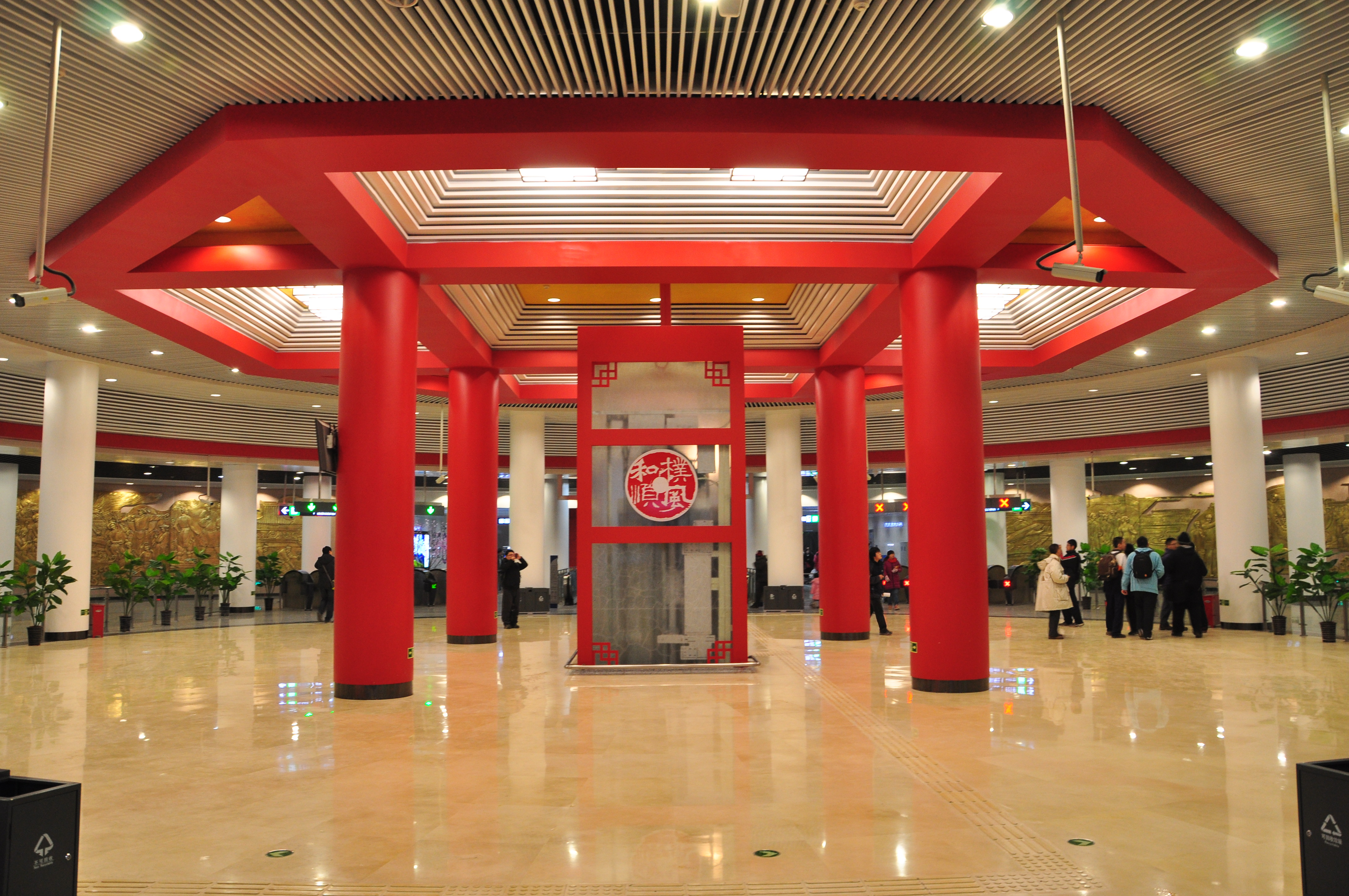
- Concourse

General information
- Location: Fuqian Middle Street (府前中街) / Fuqian East Street (府前东街) and Guangming South Street (光明南街) / Guangming North Street (光明北街); Shunyi District, Beijing; China
- Coordinates: 40°07′48″N 116°39′25″E
- Operator: Beijing Mass Transit Railway Operation Corporation Limited
- Line: Line 15
- Platforms: 2 (1 island platform)
- Tracks: 2

Construction
- Structure type: Underground
- Accessible: Yes

History
- Opened: December 31, 2011; 14 years ago

Services
| Preceding station | Beijing Subway | Following station |
|---|---|---|
| Shimen towards Qinghua Donglu Xikou | Line 15 | Fengbo Terminus |
Location
- Location within Beijing

Shunyi Station (simplified Chinese: 顺义站; traditional Chinese: 順義站; pinyin: Shùnyì Zhàn) is a station on Line 15 of the Beijing Subway. It is located in Shunyi District.

== Station layout ==
The station has an underground island platform.

== Exits ==
There are 4 exits, lettered A, B, C, and D. Exit C is accessible.

== Gallery ==
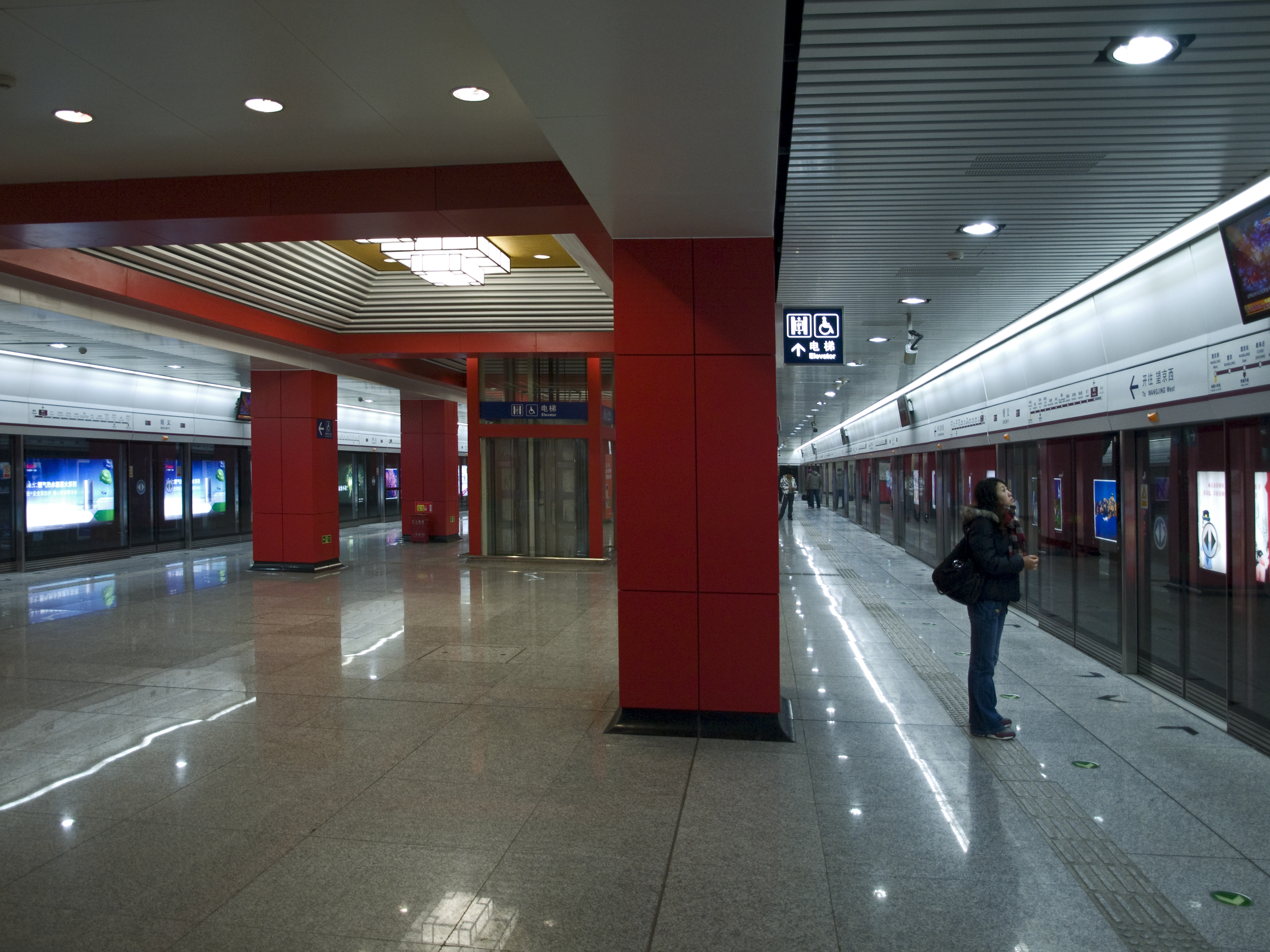
Platform

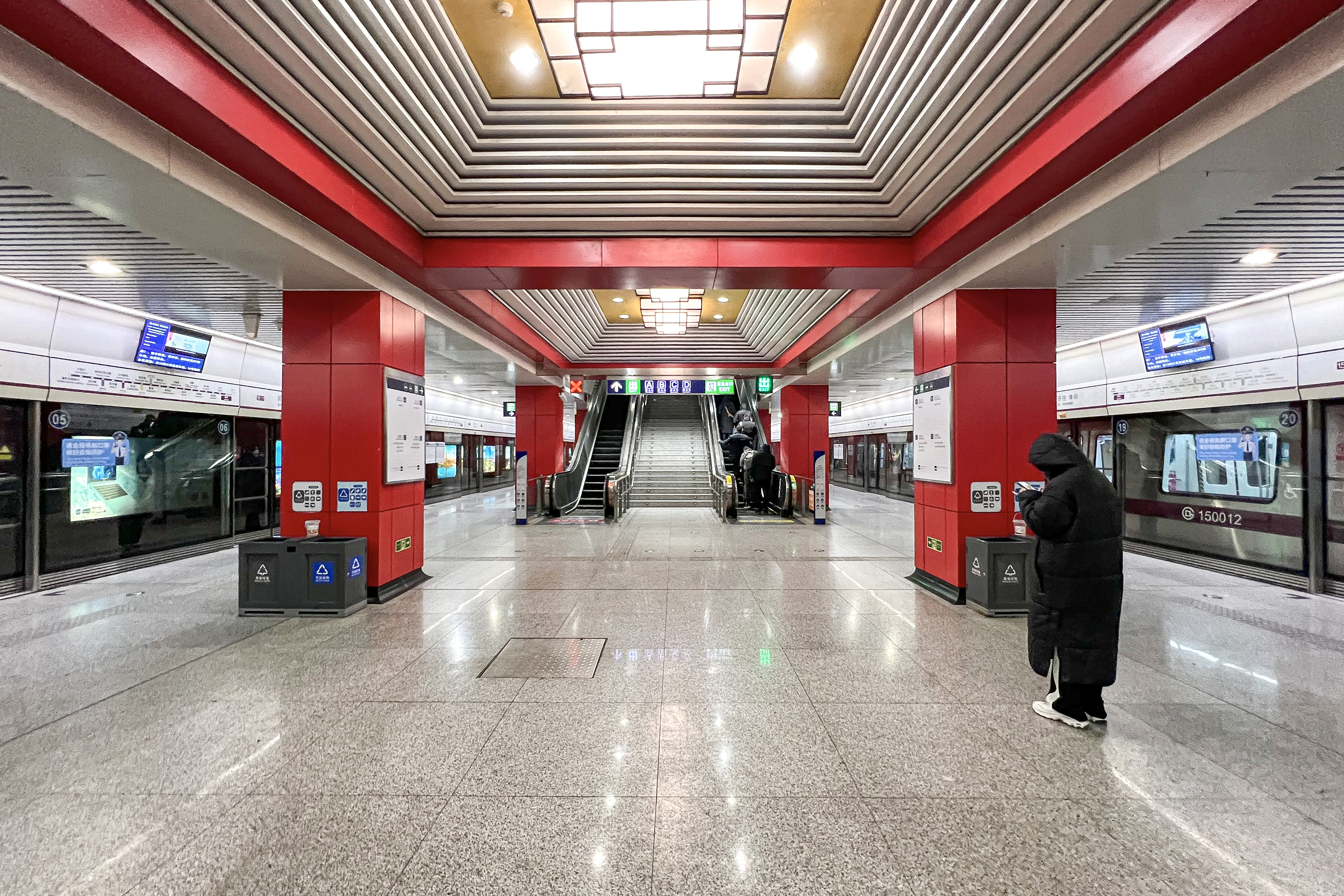
Platform
