= NS15 =

NS15, NS-15, NS 15, NS.15, or variation, may refer to:

== Places ==
- Yio Chu Kang MRT station (station code: NS15), Ang Mo Kio, Singapore
- Cumberland South (constituency N.S. 15), Nova Scotia, Canada
- Para District (FIPS region code NS15), Suriname

== Other uses ==
- Blue Origin NS-15, a 2021 April 14 Blue Origin suborbital spaceflight mission for the New Shepard
- RAF N.S. 15, a British NS class airship
- New Penguin Shakespeare volume 15

== See also ==
- NS (disambiguation)
- 15 (disambiguation)
