= 15 =

Fifteen or 15 most often refers to:

- 15 (number), the natural number following 14 and preceding 16
- One of the years 15 BC, AD 15, 1915, 2015

Fifteen or 15 may also refer to:

== Music ==
=== Artists ===
- Fifteen (band), a punk rock band

=== Albums ===
- 15 (Buckcherry album), 2005
- 15 (Ani Lorak album), 2007
- 15 (Phatfish album), 2008
- 15 (Tuki album), 2025
- 15 (mixtape), 2018, by Bhad Bhabie
- Fifteen (Green River Ordinance album), 2016
- Fifteen (The Wailin' Jennys album), 2017
- Fifteen, 2012, by Colin James

=== Songs ===
- "Fifteen" (song), 2008, by Taylor Swift from the album Fearless
- "15", a 2007 song by Rilo Kiley from the album Under the Blacklight
- "15", a 2007 song by Sons of Alpha Centauri from the album Sons of Alpha Centaur
- "15", a 2009 song by Marilyn Manson from the album The High End of Low
- "15", a 2012 song by Dean Blunt and Inga Copeland from the album Black Is Beautiful
- "Fifteen", a 1959 song by Harry Belafonte from the album Love Is a Gentle Thing
- "Fifteen", a 2004 song by Aiden from the album Our Gangs Dark Oath
- "Fifteen", a 2010 song by Never Shout Never from the album What Is Love?
- "Fifteen", a 2012 song by Ringo Deathstarr from the album Mauve
- "Fifteen", a 2016 song by My America Is Watching Tigers Die from the album Misses
- "Fifteen", a 2020 song by Mandy Moore from the album Silver Landings

== People ==
- 15 (software engineer) (born 1998/1999), software engineer

== Other media ==
- 15 (film), a 2003 Singaporean film
- Fifteen (TV series), international release name of Hillside, a Canadian-American teen drama
- "Fifteen" (Runaways), an episode of Runaways
- Fifteen (novel), a 1956 juvenile fiction novel by Beverly Cleary

== Other uses ==
- 15.ai, an AI speech synthesis web application
- Fifteen, Ohio, a community in the US
- Fifteen puzzle, a sliding puzzle
- Fifteen (confection), a sweet traybake confection from Northern Ireland
- The Fifteen, the Jacobite rising of 1715 where the House of Stuart attempted to regain the throne of the UK
- 15 years old is the age of Quinceañera

== See also ==
- Fifteenth (disambiguation)
- Line 15 (disambiguation), various metro lines
- Route 15 (disambiguation), various highways and public transport routes
- 15 rating (disambiguation)
