= Line 15 =

Line 15 may refer to:

== China ==
- Line 15 (Beijing Subway), in China
- Line 15 (Guangzhou Metro), in China
- Line 15 (Shanghai Metro), in China
- Line 15 (Xi'an Metro), in China

== Other countries ==
- Line 15 (Paris Metro), in France, under construction
- Line 15 (São Paulo Metro), in Brazil
- Helsinki light rail line 15, in Finland
- Mascouche line, also designated as line 15, a commuter rail service in Greater Montreal, Quebec

== See also ==
- List of public transport routes numbered 15
