= Route 15 =

Route 15 may refer to:

- One of several highways - see List of highways numbered 15
- One of several public transport routes - see List of public transport routes numbered 15
