= List of public transport routes numbered 15 =

In public transport, Route 15 may refer to:

- Route 15 (MTA Maryland), a bus route in Baltimore, Maryland and its suburbs
- Route 15 (MBTA) in Massachusetts
- London Buses route 15
- London Buses route 15 (Heritage)
- SEPTA Route 15, a streetcar route in Philadelphia, Pennsylvania

== See also ==
- Line 15 (disambiguation)
