= Line 15 (Beijing Subway) =

Rapid transit line in Beijing, China

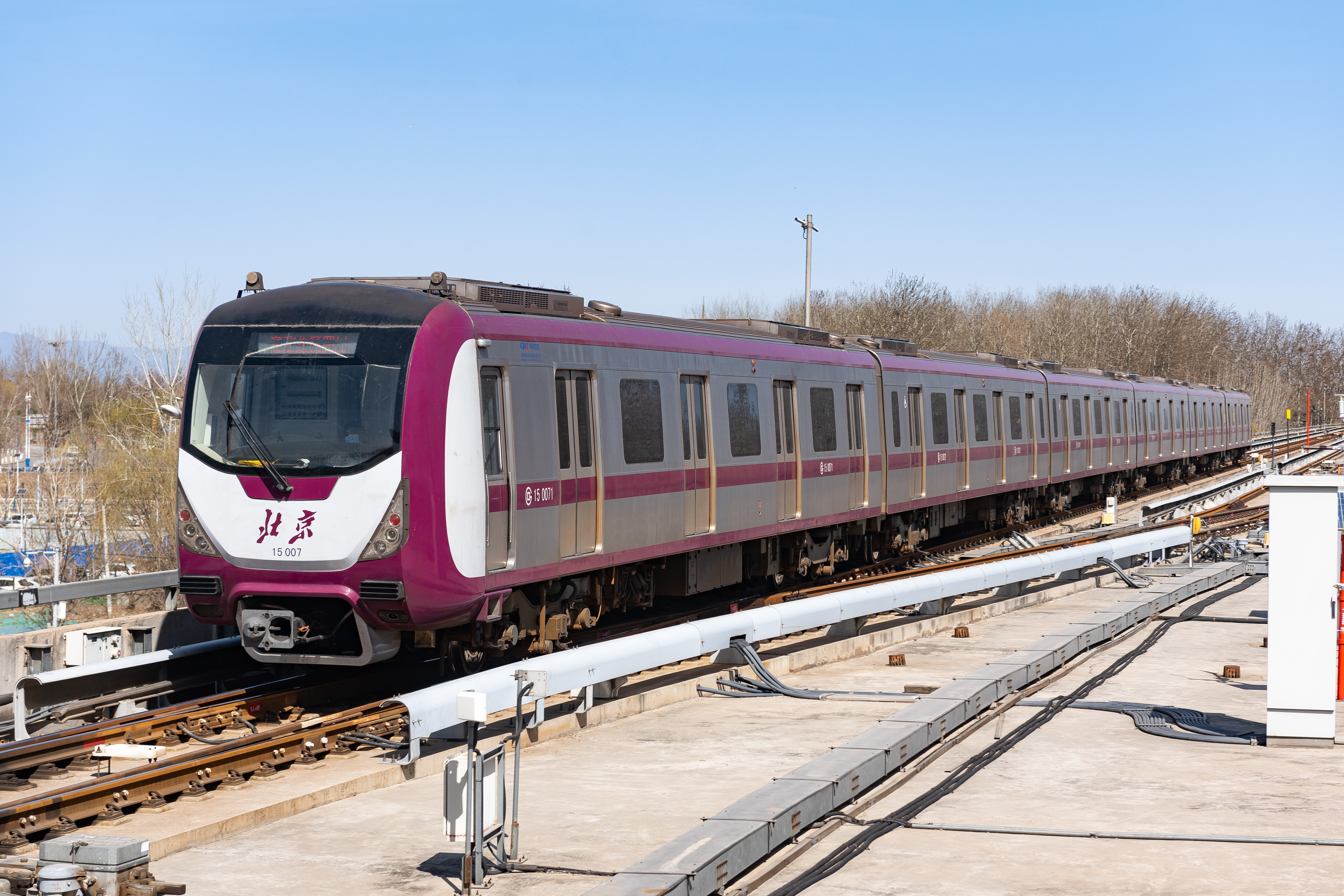
- Line 15 train approaching Houshayu station

Overview
- Other name: M15 (planned name)
- Status: Operational
- Locale: Haidian, Chaoyang, and Shunyi districts Beijing
- Termini: Qinghua Donglu Xikou; Fengbo
- Stations: 20

Service
- Type: Rapid transit
- System: Beijing Subway
- Operator: Beijing Mass Transit Railway Operation Corp., Ltd
- Depot(s): Fengbo, Maquanying
- Rolling stock: 6-car Type B (DKZ31)
- Daily ridership: 337,500 (2024 Avg.)

History
- Opened: December 30, 2010; 15 years ago

Technical
- Line length: 41.4 km (25.7 mi)
- Character: Underground/Elevated
- Track gauge: 1,435 mm (4 ft 8 1/2 in) standard gauge
- Electrification: 750 V DC Third rail

Line 15 of the Beijing Subway (simplified Chinese: 北京地铁15号线; traditional Chinese: 北京地鐵15號線; pinyin: běijīng dìtiě shíwǔhào xiàn) is a rapid transit rail line in northern Beijing. Line 15's color is purple.

The line has a total length of 41.4 kilometres (25.7 mi) across northern Beijing from Qinghua Donglu Xikou in Haidian District in the west, to Fengbo in Shunyi District in the east. The line uses Sparcs CBTC system supplied by Nippon Signal. It cost ¥17.6 billion. The line features 6-car trains similar to other lines in the Beijing Subway. Tunnels of Line 15 are up to 38 metres (125 ft) underground, making them the deepest in Beijing's subway system. Trains run every 2–3 minutes during the rush hour with some trains performing express services. A journey on a local all stop train from Fengbo to Qinghua Donglu Xikou station takes about 60 minutes.

== Route ==
The line is 41.4 km (25.7 mi) long, with 20 stations, with 4 transfer stations at Wangjing (Line 14), Wangjingxi (Line 13), Datunludong (Line 5) and Olympic Park (Line 8). The line run from Qinghua Donglu Xikou in Haidian District to Fengbo in Shunyi District. Line 15 travels underground from Qinghua Donglu Xikou to Maquanying, and then goes above ground on an elevated track to Houshayu before returning underground and going underneath the Chaobai River to Fengbo. The elevated section is high enough to allow elevated roads to pass underneath. A major public venue on the Line 15 is the New China International Exhibition Center (New CIEC) at the China International Exhibition Center station. New CIEC holds the annual Beijing International Automotive Exhibition, which attracted 800,000 visitors in 2012.

=== List of stations ===
Service Route			Station Name		Connections	Nearby Bus Stops	Distance km		Location
L	R	G	English	Chinese	Connections	Nearby Bus Stops	Distance km		Location
●	●	●	Qinghua Donglu Xikou	清华东路西口		355 392 438 450 466 549 专12	0.000	0.000	Haidian
●	●	●	Liudao Kou	六道口	Changping	26 355 398 438 450 478 490 577 603 606 632 693 夜4 专12	1.144	1.144	Haidian
●	●	●	Beishatan	北沙滩		16 26 135 143 307 319 345 425 438 450 478 484 518 577 607 609 618 625 695 夜38	1.337	2.481	Haidian
●	●	●	Aolinpike Gongyuan (Olympic Park)	奥林匹克公园	8	311 319 379 450 466 484 695	1.999	4.480	Chaoyang
●	●	●	Anli Lu	安立路		108 124 141 301 311 319 379 415 419 425 450 484 518 538 653 695 905 BRT3(快速公交3)	1.368	5.848	Chaoyang
●	●	●	Datunludong	大屯路东	5	311 319 415 425 430 484 538 569 596 620 695 夜26	0.938	6.786	Chaoyang
●	●	●	Guanzhuang	关庄		386 569 658	1.087	7.873	Chaoyang
●	●	●	Wangjingxi	望京西	13 17	450 538 547 571 851 854 866 907 928 987 快速直达专线197 专112	2.071	9.944	Chaoyang
●	●	●	Wangjing	望京	14	130 132 404 416 451 593 604 617 621 851 855 928 966 991 专15	1.758	11.702	Chaoyang
●	●	●	Wangjingdong	望京东		445 快速直达专线38 专15 专112	1.652	13.354	Chaoyang
●	｜	●	Cuigezhuang	崔各庄		415 944 991 专116 专140	2.295	15.649	Chaoyang
●	｜	●	Maquanying	马泉营		882 944 988 991 专122 专201	2.008	17.657	Chaoyang
●	｜	●	Sunhe	孙河		405 415 538 586 842 850 854 857 915 916 991 通医专线5 专200 专201	3.309	20.966	Chaoyang
●	｜	●	China Int'l Exhibition Center	国展		842 850 915 916 933 955 顺10 顺22 顺31 顺57 顺62 顺62区 顺88	3.386	24.352	Shunyi
●	｜	●	Hualikan	花梨坎		915 916 933 955 顺10 顺27 顺42 顺57 顺62 顺62区 顺65 顺88	1.615	25.967	Shunyi
●	●	●	Houshayu	后沙峪		855 915 916 923 950 955 顺28 顺38 顺46 顺46区 顺57 顺58 顺69 顺69区 顺71 顺72 S101	3.354	29.321	Shunyi
●	●	｜	Nanfaxin	南法信		923 顺2 顺4 顺27 顺28 顺38 顺43 顺59 顺61 顺66 顺77	4.576	33.897	Shunyi
●	●	｜	Shimen	石门	Tongmi (Shunyi railway station)	915 923 顺2 顺4 顺12 顺12区 顺13 顺27 顺28 顺29 顺29区 顺32 顺36 顺37 顺38 顺43 顺49 顺59 顺60 顺66 顺66区 顺68 顺70 顺82	2.712	36.609	Shunyi
●	●	｜	Shunyi	顺义		850 850快 856 861 915 923 945 顺1 顺2 顺3 顺4 顺5 顺11 顺12 顺14 顺14A 顺15 顺16 顺17 顺17A 顺18 顺18A 顺19 顺20 顺21 顺23 顺24 顺25 顺29 顺29区 顺30 顺30A 顺31 顺33 顺34 顺35 顺36 顺37 顺39 顺41 顺43 顺73 顺76 顺79	1.331	37.940	Shunyi
●	●	●	Fengbo	俸伯		856 915 918 923 924 945 970 顺15 顺16 顺18 顺18A 顺19 顺20 顺23 顺24 顺28 顺31 顺33 顺36 顺37 顺39 顺40 顺41 顺43 顺47 顺55 顺76 顺79 S101	2.441	40.381	Shunyi

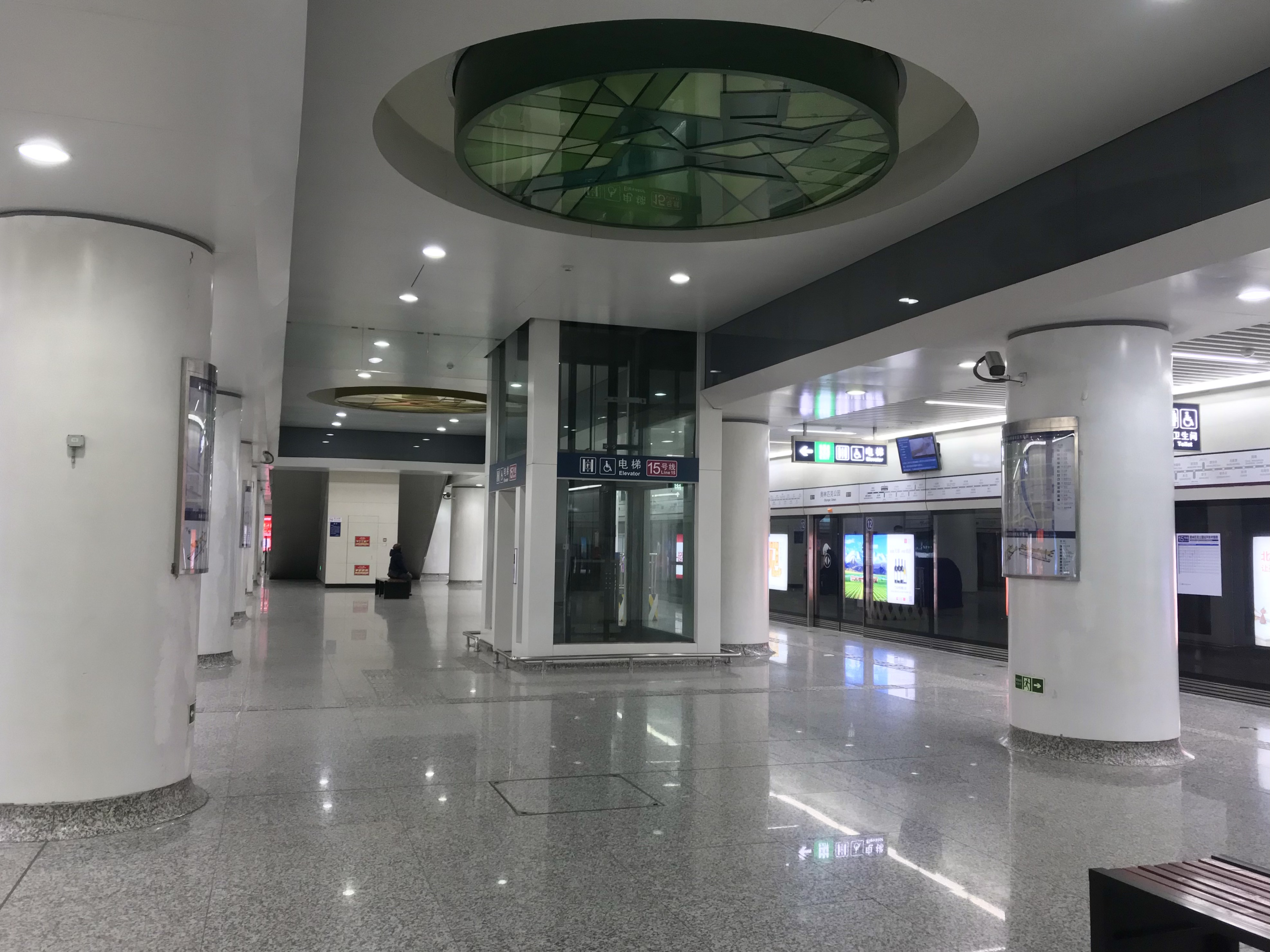
Aolinpike Gongyuan (Olympic Park) station

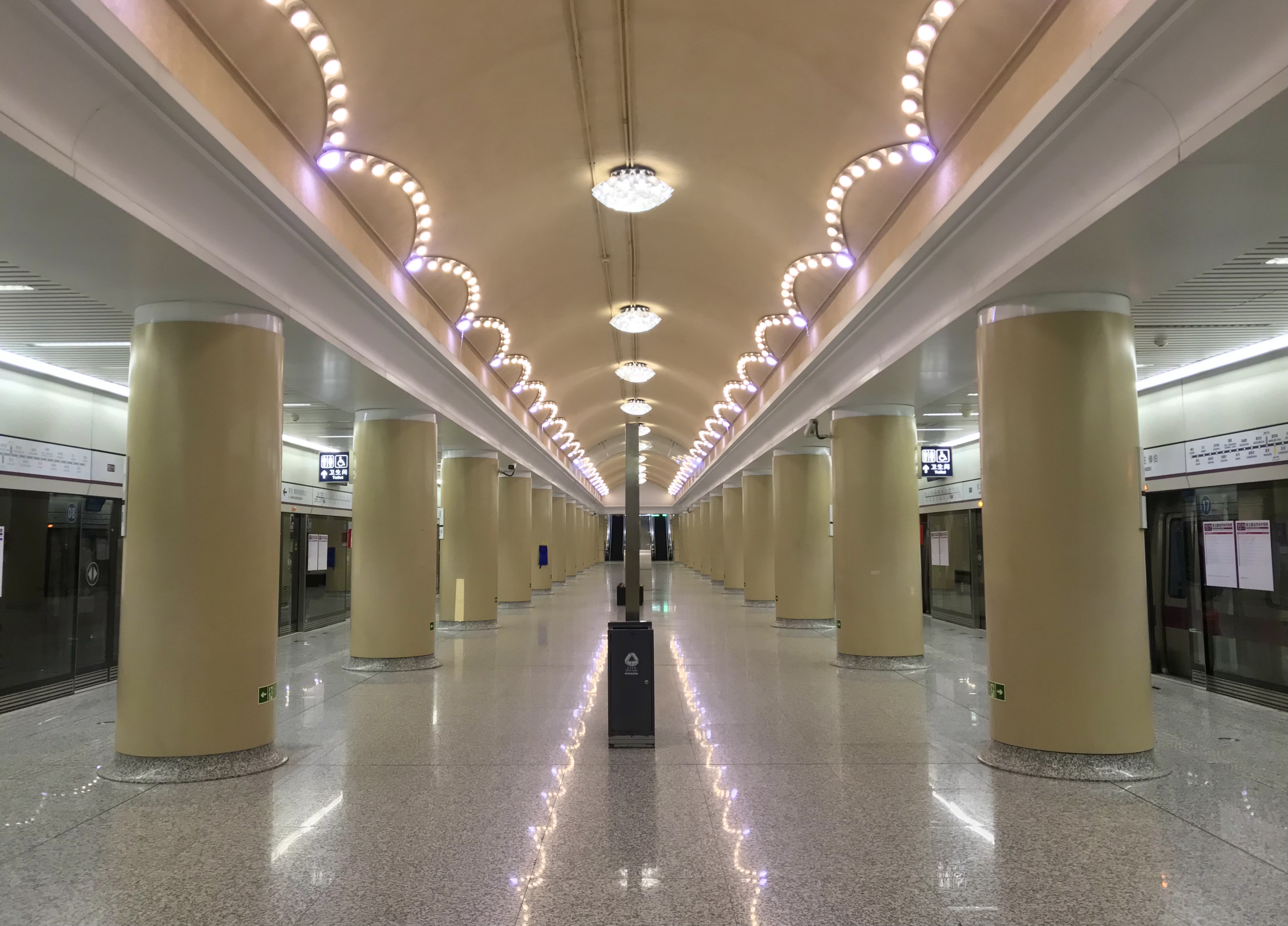
Anli Lu Station

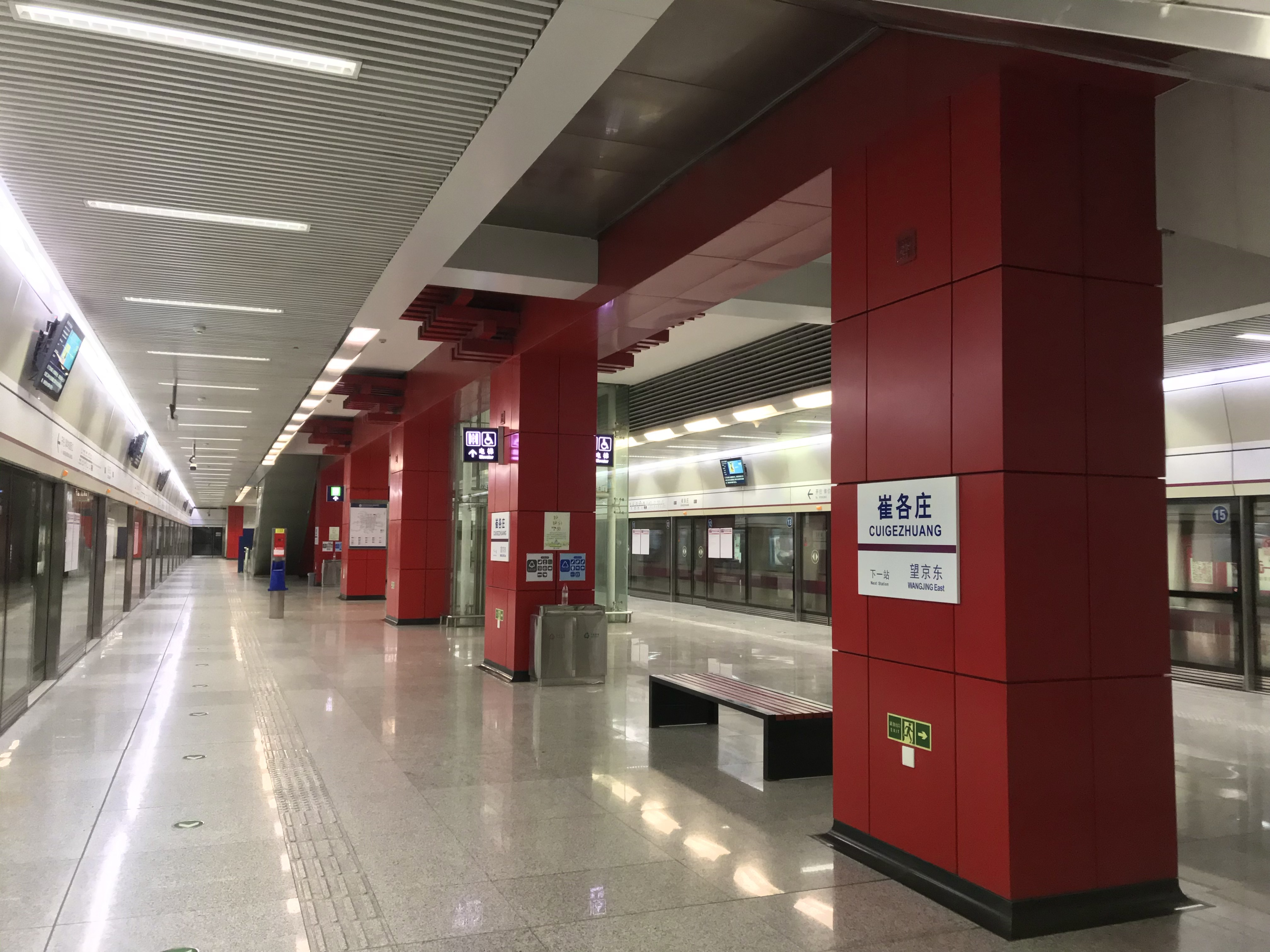
Cuigezhuang Station

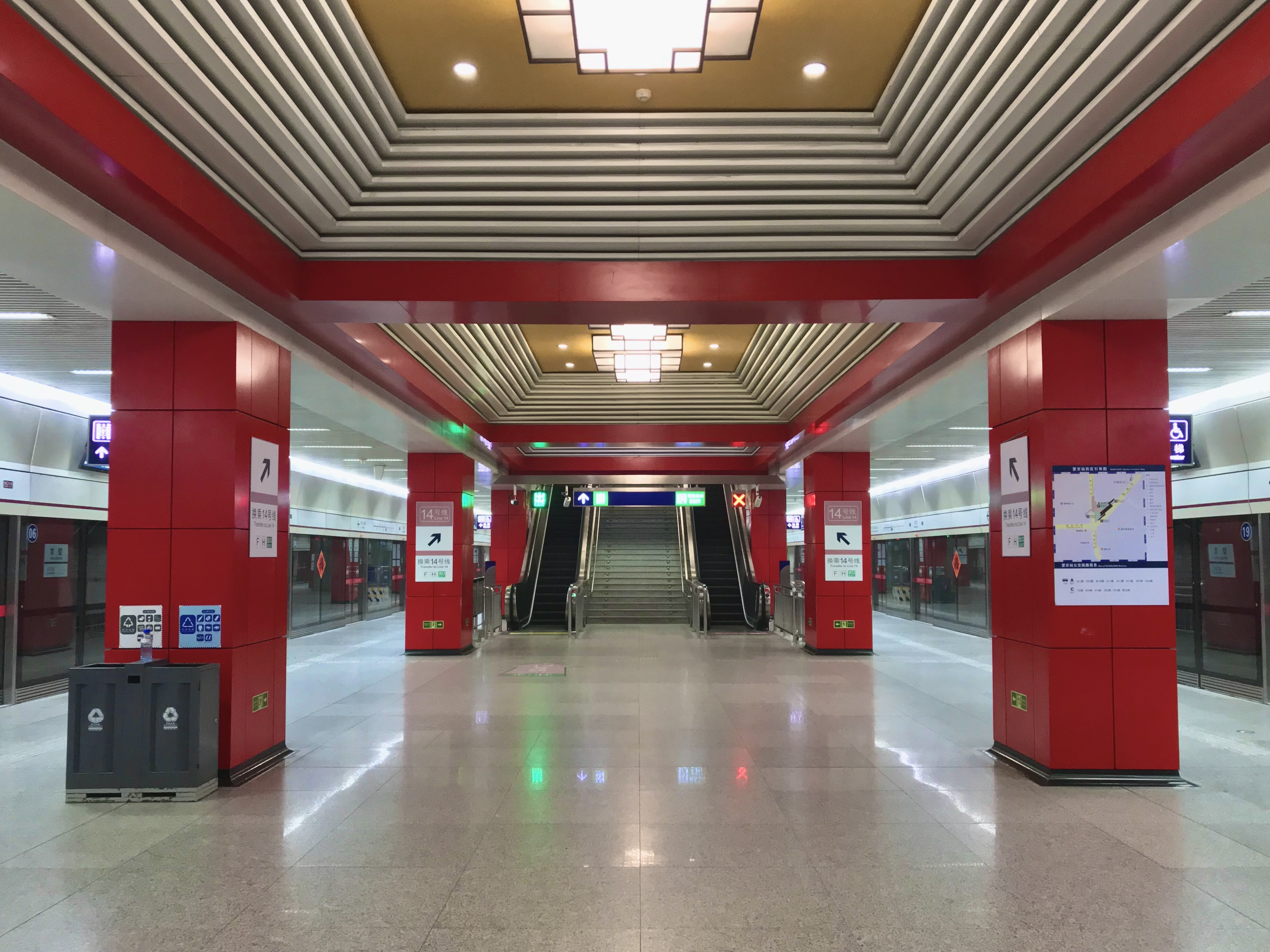
Wangjing Station

== History ==
During planning of Line 15, the eastern terminus was moved from Fuqian Jie to the east bank of the Chaobai River. Construction began on Phase I of Line 15 in Shunyi District on April 11, 2009. At that time, Phase I of Line 15 was only 31.15 km (19.36 mi) long with 12 stations. According to the construction schedule in 2009, the easternmost Shunyi section of Phase I (18.5 km or 11.5 mi in length with seven stations) would be opened first on December 30, 2011. The remainder of Phase I would follow in May 2013.

The route of Line 15's Phase II has been revised several times over the years. In April 2009, Phase II plans showed the western half of Line 15 running from Xiyuan Station in Haidian District, through the campus of Tsinghua University, Zhongguancun, and the Olympic Green, and joining Phase I at Wangjingxi. When track-laying began in Phase I on October 28, 2009, the schedule and alignment of Phase II underwent a major revision, with one proposal extending Line 15 westward as originally planned with additional stations and another proposal sending Line 15 southward and parallel to Line 8 to provide relief for congested Line 4 and 5. Ultimately the route west to Qinghua Donglu Xikou was selected and the design of Xiyuan station leaves enough space to build another platform in between Line 4 and Line 16 platform for potential Line 15 extension westward beyond Qinghua Donglu Xikou. Additionally the construction schedule was revised with Phase I expanded from 31 km (19 mi) and 12 stations to 38 km (24 mi) and 18 stations. Phase II plans also underwent a revision; instead of two sections, Phase II would be built and opened in three sections.

The first section of Phase I, from Wangjingxi to Houshayu, opened on December 30, 2010. The second, from Houshayu to Fengbo, followed at the end of 2011. The third section, from Qinghua Donglu Xikou to Wangjingxi, opened on December 28, 2014.

On 8 July 2022, an EIA document regarding Phase III construction of Beijing rail transport system (2022–2027) announced the phase 2 of line 15, with 3.5 km long extension from Fengbo to Nancai.

Line 15 (Phase I) stations, from east to west:

Section 1, opened Dec. 30, 2010	Section 2, opened Dec 31, 2011	Section 3, opened Dec 28, 2014
Houshayu 后沙峪; Hualikan 花梨坎; China Int'l Exhibition Center 国展; Sunhe 孙河; Maquanying 马泉营; Cuigezhuang 崔各庄; Wangjingdong 望京东*; Wangjing 望京 (Line 14); Wangjingxi 望京西 (Line 13)	Fengbo 俸伯; Shunyi 顺义; Shimen 石门; Nanfaxin 南法信	Guanzhuang 关庄; Datunludong 大屯路东** (Line 5); Anli Lu 安立路; Aolinpike Gongyuan (Olympic Park) 奥林匹克公园 (Line 8); Beishatan 北沙滩; Liudao Kou 六道口; Qinghua Donglu Xikou 清华东路西口

* Wangjingdong station did not open in 2010 due to lack of connections with the surrounding road system. It was opened on 31 December 2016.

** Datunludong station did not open in 2014 because the transfer corridors to Line 5 were still under construction. It was opened on 26 December 2015.

Segment	Commencement	Length	Station(s)	Name
Wangjingxi — Houshayu	30 December 2010	17.725 km (11.01 mi)	8	Phase 1 (1st section)
Houshayu — Fengbo	31 December 2011	11.060 km (6.87 mi)	4	Phase 1 (2nd section)
Qinghua Donglu Xikou — Wangjingxi	28 December 2014	9.944 km (6.18 mi)	6	Phase 1 (3rd section)
Datunludong	26 December 2015	Infill station	1	
Wangjingdong	31 December 2016	Infill station	1	

== Rolling Stock ==
Model	Image	Manufacturer	Year built	Amount in service	Fleet numbers	Depot
DKZ31		CRRC Changchun Railway Vehicles	2010	28	15 001–15 028	Maquanying; Fengbo

On May 17, 2021, numerous BJD01 units of the Fangshan line were sent to Line 15. They have returned to the Fangshan line as of September 2022.
