= Fifteen, Ohio =

Unincorporated community in Ohio, U.S.

Coordinates: 39°31′48″N 81°16′48″W

Fifteen is an unincorporated community in Washington County, in the U.S. state of Ohio.

== History ==
A variant name is Fifteen Mile. The community was so named on account of its location, 15 miles (24 km) from Marietta. A post office called Fifteen was established in 1872, and remained in operation until 1918.
