= Qinghua Donglu Xikou station =

Beijing Subway station

Qinghua Donglu Xikou 清华东路西口
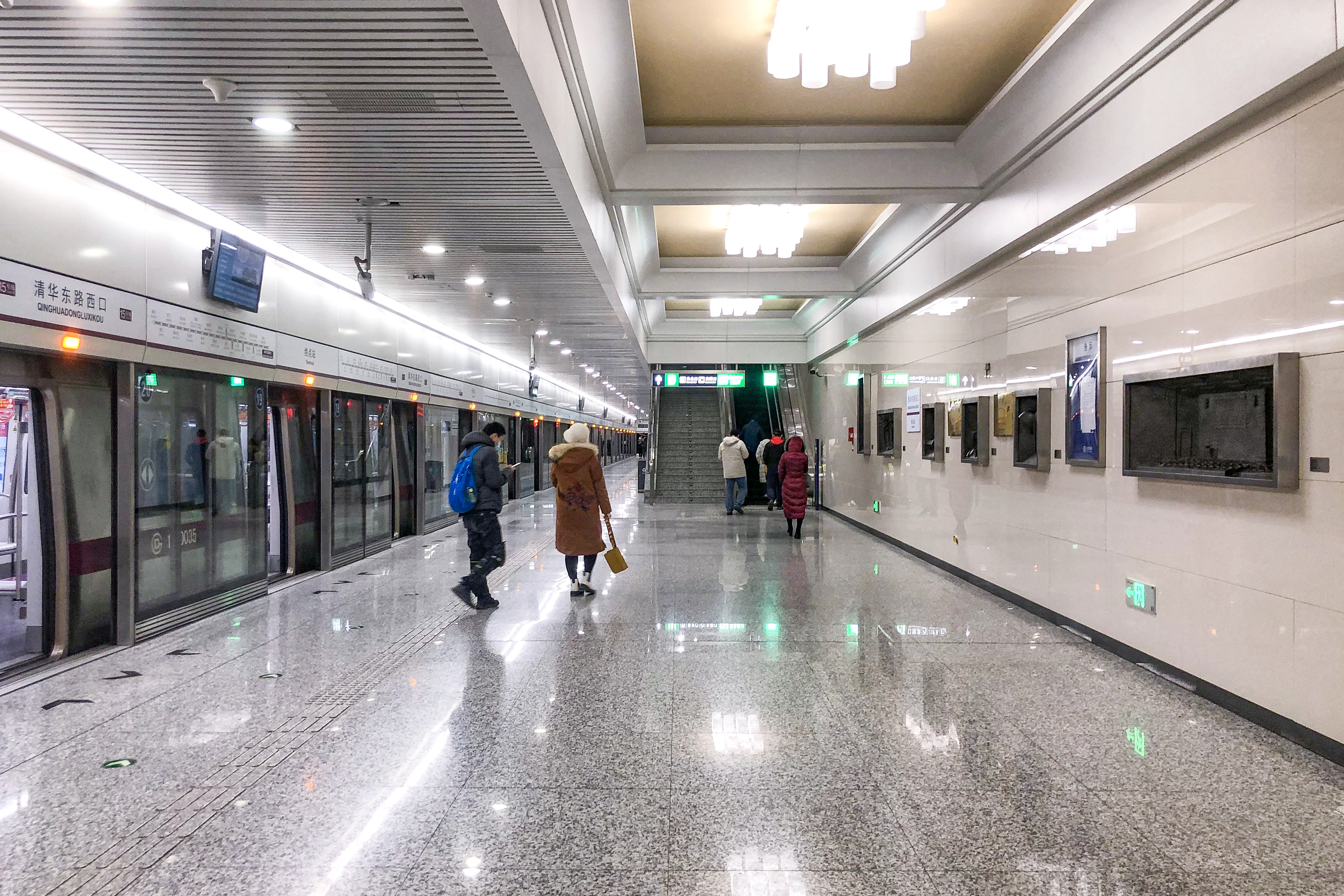
- Westbound platform

General information
- Location: Qinghua East Road between Shuangqing Road (双清路) and Wangzhuang Road (王庄路); Haidian District, Beijing; China
- Coordinates: 40°00′02″N 116°20′22″E
- Operator: Beijing Mass Transit Railway Operation Corporation Limited
- Line: Line 15
- Platforms: 2 (2 side platforms)
- Tracks: 2

Construction
- Structure type: Underground
- Accessible: Yes

History
- Opened: December 28, 2014; 11 years ago

Services
Preceding station	Beijing Subway	Following station
Terminus	Line 15	Liudao Kou towards Fengbo
Location
- Location within Beijing

Qinghua Donglu Xikou station (simplified Chinese: 清华东路西口站; traditional Chinese: 清華東路西口站; pinyin: Qīnghuá Dōnglù Xīkǒu zhàn) is a station on Line 15 of the Beijing Subway. It was opened on December 28, 2014, as a part of the stretch from Wangjingxi and serves as the western terminus of the line. The preceding station is Liudao Kou.

An infill station at this location on Line 13, between the existing Wudao Kou and Shangdi stations, is under construction. Construction of the Line 13 station started in May 2024. After the construction is completed, the station will be a transfer station on Line 13 and Line 15.

== Station layout ==
=== Line 15 ===
The station on Line 15 has two underground side platforms.

=== Line 13 ===
The station on Line 13 will be an elevated station with two side platforms.

== Exits ==
There are two exits in operation, lettered B and C. Exit C is accessible.

== Gallery ==
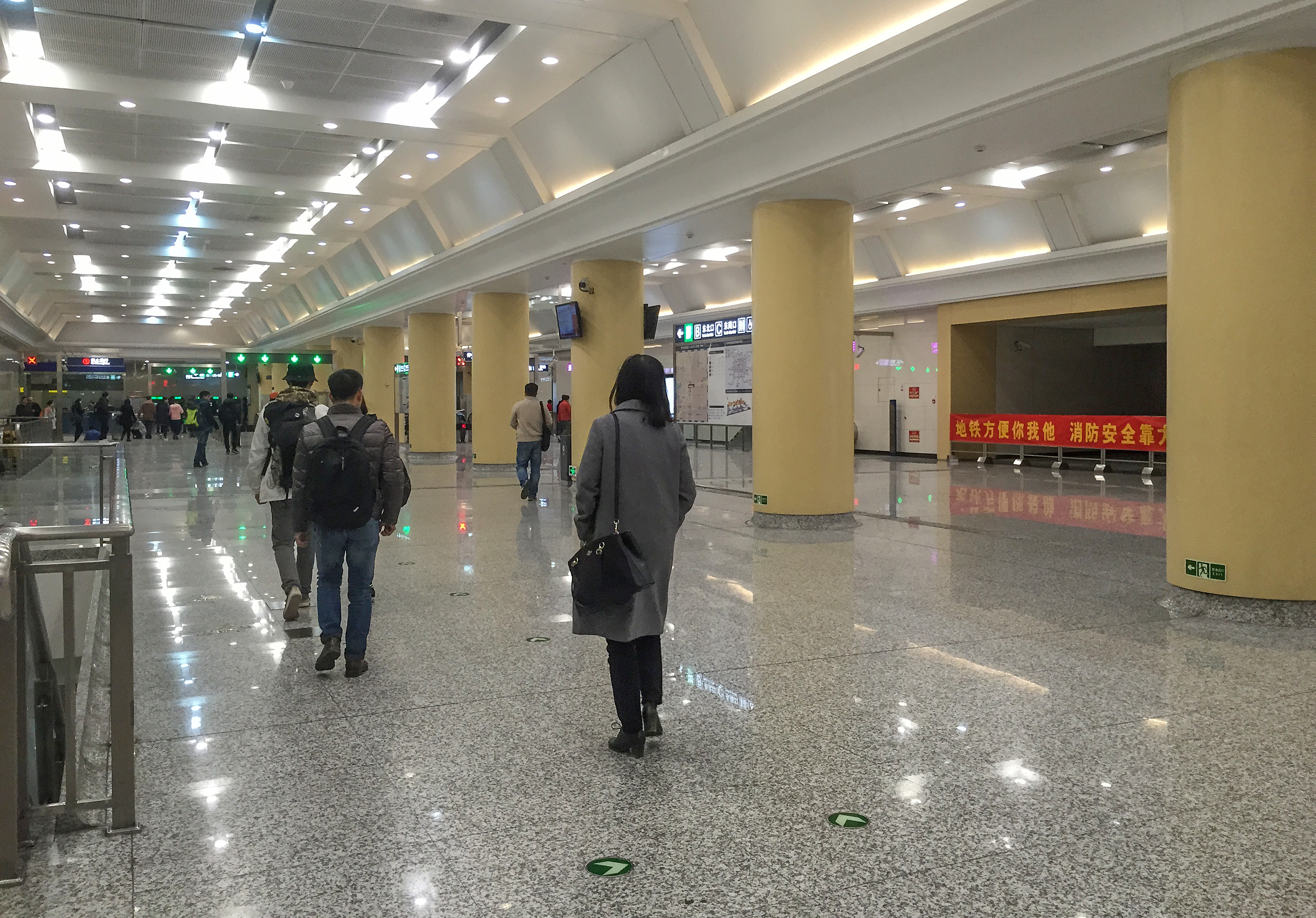
Line 15 concourse
