= Fengbo station =

Beijing Subway station

Fengbo 俸伯
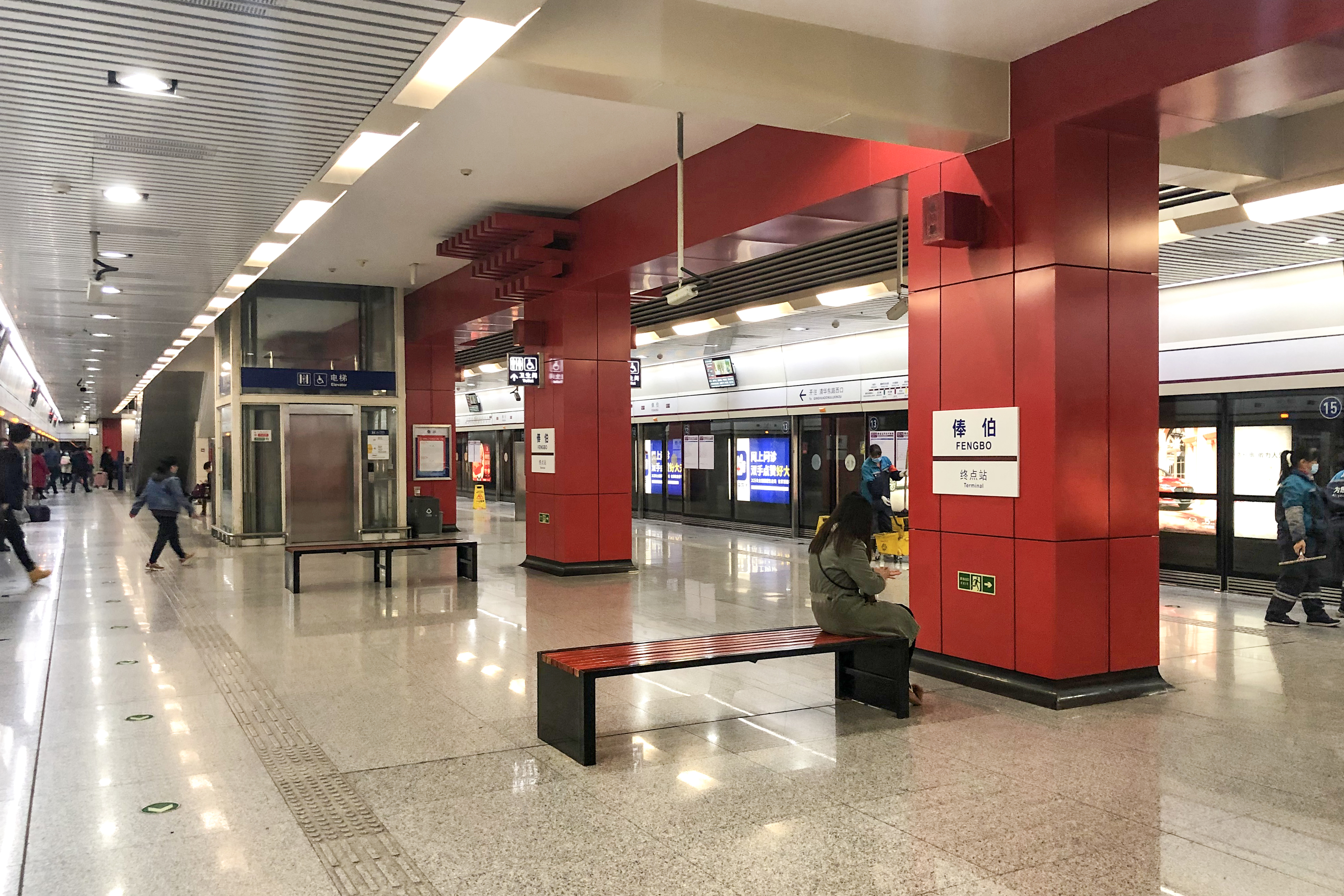
- Platform

General information
- Location: Shunyi District, Beijing; China
- Coordinates: 40°07′57″N 116°41′05″E
- Operator: Beijing Mass Transit Railway Operation Corporation Limited
- Line: Line 15
- Platforms: 2 (1 island platform)
- Tracks: 2

Construction
- Structure type: Underground
- Accessible: Yes

History
- Opened: December 31, 2011; 14 years ago

Services
Preceding station	Beijing Subway	Following station
Shunyi towards Qinghua Donglu Xikou	Line 15	Terminus
Houshayu towards Qinghua Donglu Xikou	Line 15 Green service pattern	Terminus
Location
- Location within Beijing

Fengbo Station (Chinese: 俸伯站; pinyin: Fèngbó Zhàn) is a station on and the eastern terminus of Line 15 of the Beijing Subway.

== Station layout ==
The station has an underground island platform.

== Exits ==
There are four exits, lettered A, B, C1, and C2. Exit C2 is accessible.
