= COMDEX =

Computer trade show, 1979 to 2003

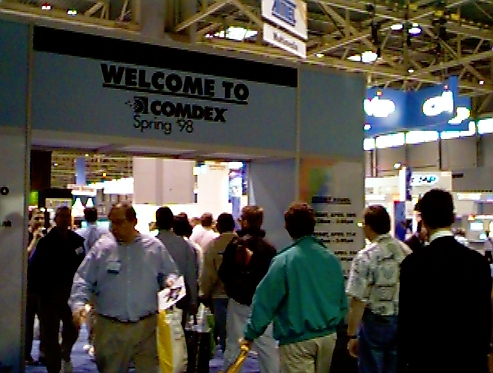
- Entrance to COMDEX/Spring '98 at the McCormick Place in Chicago
- Status: Defunct
- Genre: Computer show
- Country: United States (1979–2003); International (1982–2005)
- Years active: 1979–2005
- Inaugurated: December 3, 1979; 46 years ago
- Most recent: November 20, 2005; 20 years ago
- Attendance: 225,000 (1996, peak)
- Organizer: The Interface Group (1979–1995); Softbank Corp (1995–2001); Key3Media (2001–2003)
- Website: comdex.com (archived from the original on December 6, 1998)

COMDEX (an abbreviation of COMputer Dealers' EXhibition) was a computer expo trade show held in the Las Vegas Valley of Nevada, United States, each November from 1979 to 2003. It was one of the largest computer trade shows in the world, usually second only to the German CeBIT, and one of the largest trade shows in any industry sector. COMDEX exhibitions were held in many other countries from 1982 to 2005, with 185 shows altogether. The first COMDEX was held in 1979 at the MGM Grand (now Horseshoe), with 167 exhibitors and 3,904 attendees. In 1981, the first COMDEX/Spring was held in New York City.

== History ==
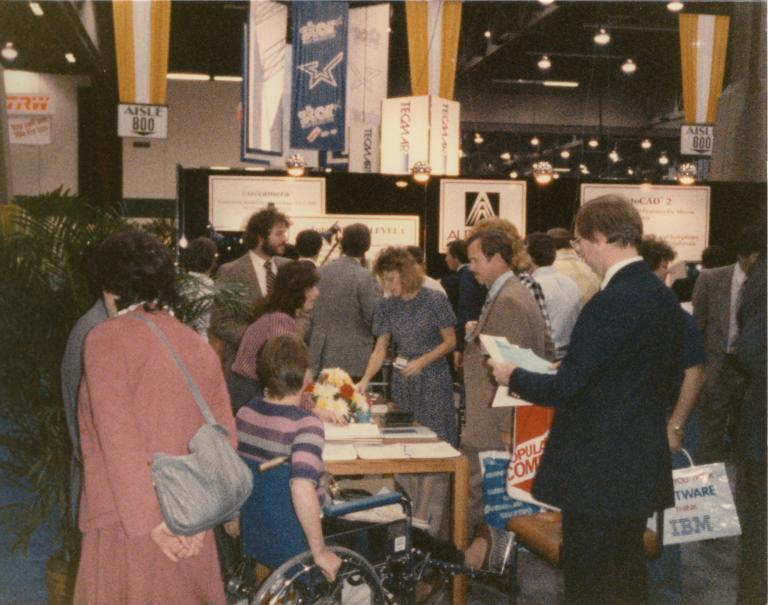
AutoCAD booth at COMDEX/Fall '84 at the Las Vegas Convention Center

=== Organizers ===
==== The Interface Group ====
COMDEX was started by The Interface Group, whose organizers included Sheldon Adelson, and Richard Katzeff. In 1995, they sold the show to the Japanese technology conglomerate Softbank Corp. In 2001, Softbank sold the show to Key3Media, a spin-off of Ziff Davis. After entering Chapter 11 bankruptcy in February 2003, Key3Media resurfaced as Medialive International with a cash infusion from Thomas Weisel Capital Partners, which had previously invested in the company. In November 2006, Forbes magazine reported that United Business Media PLC had purchased the events assets of MediaLive International Inc.

==== Northeast Computer Faire ====
Personal Computer Faire in San Francisco, the Northeast Computer Faire in Boston, and Southern California Computer Faire were presented by Computer Faire Inc., Newton, Mass., a subsidiary of Prentice-Hall.

Northeast Computer Faire 1988 was presented by The Interface Group and Boston Computer Society in Boston.

=== Attendance ===
COMDEX was initially restricted to those directly involved in the computer industry. It was the one show where all levels of manufacturers and developers of computers, peripherals, software, components, and accessories met with distributors, retailers, consultants and their competitors.

Colloquially known as "Geek Week", COMDEX evolved into a major technical convention, with the industry making major product announcements and releases there. Numerous small companies from around the world rose to prominence following appearance at COMDEX, and industry leaders sought opportunities to make keynote addresses. They discussed the computer industry, history, trends and future potential. The first COMDEX Conference, attracted 4000 paying attendees and grew to over 100,000, becoming a launch platform for key technologies. Bluetooth and USB had conference programming and associated exhibition floor pavilions to help these technologies and start up companies be seen in such a large event and marketplace. In 1982, Microsoft founder Bill Gates attended the conference and saw a demonstration of VisiCorp's Visi On, a GUI software suite for IBM PC compatible computers. The development of Windows 1.0 began soon thereafter. In 1999, Linus Torvalds attended the exhibition to talk about the Linux family of operating system. A Linux conference and exhibition hall was a co-located event, helping elevate the open source products.

In the late 1980s, COMDEX was opened to the general public, causing an explosion in attendance, but diluting COMDEX's wholesale industry focus. Retailers and consultants complained that 'leading edge' customers, upon whom they relied for early adoption of new technology, were buying products at 'show specials' and then expecting the dealers to support those products.. The broadening of audience criteria came about as IT departments decentralized and purchasing of technology products shifted from a central corporate IT budget to departments and company divisions, mirroring the shift from mainframes to decentralized networks and local area networking, and later the Internet as the corporate backbone.

=== Cities other than Las Vegas ===
After the Spring 1981 show in New York City and 1982 in Atlantic City, COMDEX began regular spring shows in Atlanta, Georgia from 1983 through 1988. Then alternated sites between Atlanta and Chicago. The final Atlanta Spring COMDEX was held in 1997; the last Spring COMDEX was planned for Chicago in April 2003 but cancelled.

The first COMDEX show outside the US was held in Amsterdam 1982. In the record years 1998 and 2000, 21 exhibitions were arranged yearly all over the world: Europe, Asia, Africa, Australia and other parts of America. 69% of the 185 shows took place outside the US. Even when the US shows were cancelled, they kept on for a short time, e.g. Gothenburg and São Paulo 2004 and the last in Athens in November 2005. The decline occurred globally: the 2000 show in Basel with 1400 exhibitors drew 79000 attendees, but 2001 17% less.

=== Early 2000s and closing ===
Following COMDEX Fall 1999 (in Las Vegas), organizers made major changes to their criteria for admission of mass media, adjusting criteria to accommodate bloggers with significant market reach, but also restricting simple and open access to anyone declaring themselves 'media'. It offered regular public attendance for the general public.

In 2000, major companies such as IBM, Apple, and Compaq (now merged with Hewlett-Packard) decided to discontinue their involvement with COMDEX to allocate resources more efficiently, usually through their own corporate events or other direct-to-consumer selling (Apple Stores), and the bursting of the dot-com bubble caused a decline on the IT market. To reduce costs following the market downturns after the 9/11 attacks many would-be exhibitors stopped renting out or scaled back official COMDEX booths on the convention center floors, and set up invitation-only suites in various Las Vegas hotels. This also allowed exhibitors to concentrate their efforts on industry attendees rather than the general public.

COMDEX/Fall 2001 organizers at Los Angeles-based Key3Media Group Inc. said they expected attendance to fall from the previous year's 200,000 to 150,000. They also expected the number of exhibitors to decline from 2,350 to 2,000 and the square footage of exhibitor space to slide from just over 1 million to 750,000.

The last Las Vegas show in November 2003 attracted only 500 exhibitors and 40,000 visitors.

In June 2004, COMDEX cancelled the 2004 exhibition in Las Vegas, effectively making the Consumer Electronics Show its replacement in Las Vegas. By 2004 the personal computer had become a commodity item priced at levels individual departments and consumers overall could buy without needing much corporate oversight, so "computers" became just one of many products in the consumer electronics channels and the Consumer Electronics Show.

== COMDEXvirtual ==
A COMDEX event originally designed to exist only on the internet without a physical meeting location. It was announced to commence during November 16–17, 2010. The COMDEX website (www.comdex.com) was operated by TechWeb, a United Business Media company.

Everything Channel and sister company UBM studios (both United Business Media Companies) partnered to deliver COMDEXvirtual (www.comdexvirtual.com) to the global IT channel community in November 2010. Nearly 5,000 attended the event over the course of the two days, making COMDEXvirtual the largest independent virtual tradeshow in the IT industry. The agenda featured more than 100 speakers and nearly 50 sessions on topics ranging from cloud to mobility and virtualization, to address the event's theme—New Business Solutions: Embracing Disruptive Technologies & Changing Delivery Models. In addition to educational sessions, there was also an Expo Hall with nearly 30 exhibitors including IBM, Intel, Microsoft, Symantec, Panasonic, and D&H. COMDEXvirtual (www.comdexvirtual.com) 2010 was available on-demand through May 17, 2011. The event returned on November 15 and 16, 2011, with 4,300 attendees, and ultimately in 2012.

== List of all COMDEX events ==
Edition	Start	End	Venue	City	Country
COMDEX '79	December 3, 1979	December 5, 1979	MGM Grand	Las Vegas	United States
COMDEX '80	November 19, 1980	November 22, 1980	MGM Grand	Las Vegas	United States
COMDEX/Spring '81	June 23, 1981	June 25, 1981	New York Coliseum	New York	United States
COMDEX '81	November 19, 1981	November 22, 1981	MGM Grand	Las Vegas	United States
COMDEX/Spring '82	June 28, 1982	June 30, 1982	Atlantic City Convention Hall	Atlantic City	United States
COMDEX/Europe '82	November 8, 1982	November 11, 1982	RAI Amsterdam Convention Centre	Amsterdam	Netherlands
COMDEX/Fall '82	November 29, 1982	December 2, 1982	Las Vegas Convention Center	Las Vegas	United States
COMDEX/Spring '83	April 26, 1983	April 29, 1983	Georgia World Congress Center	Atlanta	United States
COMDEX/Europe '83	October 24, 1983	October 27, 1983	RAI Amsterdam Convention Centre	Amsterdam	Netherlands
COMDEX/Fall '83	November 28, 1983	December 2, 1983	Las Vegas Convention Center	Las Vegas	United States
COMDEX/Winter '84	April 5, 1984	April 7, 1984	Los Angeles Convention Center	Los Angeles	United States
COMDEX/Spring '84	May 22, 1984	May 25, 1984	Georgia World Congress Center	Atlanta	United States
COMDEX/Europe '84	October 29, 1984	November 1, 1984	RAI Amsterdam Convention Centre	Amsterdam	Netherlands
COMDEX/Fall '84	November 14, 1984	November 18, 1984	Las Vegas Convention Center	Las Vegas	United States
COMDEX/Winter '85	March 21, 1985	March 24, 1985	Anaheim Convention Center	Anaheim	United States
COMDEX in Japan '85	March 26, 1985	March 28, 1985	Harumi Exhibition Center	Tokyo	Japan
COMDEX/Spring '85	May 6, 1985	May 9, 1985	Georgia World Congress Center	Atlanta	United States
COMDEX/Europe '85	October 14, 1985	October 18, 1985	RAI Amsterdam Convention Centre	Amsterdam	Netherlands
COMDEX/Fall '85	November 20, 1985	November 24, 1985	Las Vegas Convention Center	Las Vegas	United States
COMDEX in Japan '86	March 3, 1986	March 5, 1986	Harumi Exhibition Center	Tokyo	Japan
COMDEX/Winter '86	April 1, 1986	April 3, 1986	Los Angeles Convention Center	Los Angeles	United States
COMDEX/Spring '86	April 28, 1986	May 1, 1986	Georgia World Congress Center	Atlanta	United States
COMDEX/Europe '86	May 12, 1986	May 14, 1986	RAI Amsterdam Convention Centre	Amsterdam	Netherlands
COMDEX International in Europe '86	June 10, 1986	June 12, 1986	Nice Exhibition Center	Nice	France
COMDEX/Australia '86	September 2, 1986	September 6, 1986	RAS Showground	Sydney	Australia
COMDEX/Fall '86	November 10, 1986	November 14, 1986	Las Vegas Convention Center	Las Vegas	United States
COMDEX in Japan '87	March 3, 1987	March 5, 1987	Harumi Exhibition Center	Tokyo	Japan
COMDEX/Spring '87	June 1, 1987	June 4, 1987	Georgia World Congress Center	Atlanta	United States
COMDEX International in Europe '87	June 16, 1987	June 18, 1987	Palais des Expositions	Nice	France
COMDEX/Australia '87	August 19, 1987	August 21, 1987	RAS Showground	Sydney	Australia
COMDEX/Fall '87	November 2, 1987	November 6, 1987	Las Vegas Convention Center	Las Vegas	United States
COMDEX in Japan '88	March 1, 1988	March 3, 1988	Harumi Exhibition Center	Tokyo	Japan
COMDEX/Spring '88	May 9, 1988	May 12, 1988	Atlanta convention center	Atlanta	United States
COMDEX/Fall '88	November 14, 1988	November 18, 1988	Las Vegas Convention Center	Las Vegas	United States
COMDEX/Spring '89	April 10, 1989	April 13, 1989	McCormick Place	Chicago	United States
COMDEX/Fall '89	November 13, 1989	November 17, 1989	Las Vegas Convention Center	Las Vegas	United States
COMDEX/Europe at SICOB '90	April 24, 1990	April 28, 1990	Parc des Expositions de Villepinte	Paris	France
COMDEX/Spring '90	June 3, 1990	June 6, 1990	Georgia World Congress Center	Atlanta	United States
COMDEX/Classic '90	November 12, 1990	November 16, 1990	Las Vegas Convention Center	Las Vegas	United States
COMDEX/Spring '91	May 20, 1991	May 23, 1991	Georgia World Congress Center	Atlanta	United States
COMDEX/Fall '91	October 21, 1991	October 25, 1991	Las Vegas Convention Center	Las Vegas	United States
COMDEX/Spring '92	April 6, 1992	April 9, 1992	McCormick Place	Chicago	United States
COMDEX/Sucesu-SP South America '92	September 14, 1992	September 18, 1992	Pavilhão de Exposições do Anhembi	São Paulo	Brazil
COMDEX/Fall '92	November 16, 1992	November 20, 1992	Las Vegas Convention Center	Las Vegas	United States
COMDEX/Spring '93	May 24, 1993	May 27, 1993	Georgia World Congress Center	Atlanta	United States
COMDEX/Canada '93	July 13, 1993	July 15, 1993	Metro Toronto Convention Centre	Toronto	Canada
COMDEX/Sucesu-SP South America '93	August 23, 1993	August 27, 1993	Pavilhão de Exposições do Anhembi	São Paulo	Brazil
COMDEX/Fall '93	November 15, 1993	November 19, 1993	Las Vegas Convention Center	Las Vegas	United States
COMDEX/Sucesu-Rio '94	March 22, 1994	March 25, 1994	Riocentro	Rio de Janeiro	Brazil
COMDEX/Spring '94	May 23, 1994	May 26, 1994	Georgia World Congress Center	Atlanta	United States
COMDEX/Canada '94	July 13, 1994	July 15, 1994	Metro Toronto Convention Centre	Toronto	Canada
COMDEX/Sucesu-SP South America '94	September 12, 1994	September 16, 1994	Pavilhão de Exposições do Anhembi	São Paulo	Brazil
COMDEX/Fall '94	November 14, 1994	November 18, 1994	Las Vegas Convention Center	Las Vegas	United States
COMDEX/PacRim '95	January 17, 1995	January 19, 1995	Vancouver Convention Centre	Vancouver	Canada
COMDEX/Sucesu-Rio '95	April 4, 1995	April 7, 1995	Riocentro	Rio de Janeiro	Brazil
COMDEX/Spring '95	April 24, 1995	April 27, 1995	Georgia World Congress Center	Atlanta	United States
COMDEX/Canada '95	July 12, 1995	July 14, 1995	Metro Toronto Convention Centre	Toronto	Canada
COMDEX/Sucesu-SP South America '95	August 15, 1995	August 18, 1995	Pavilhão de Exposições do Anhembi	São Paulo	Brazil
COMDEX/Fall '95	November 13, 1995	November 17, 1995	Las Vegas Convention Center	Las Vegas	United States
COMDEX/PacRim '96	January 16, 1996	January 18, 1996	Vancouver Convention Centre	Vancouver	Canada
COMDEX/Sucesu-Rio '96	April 8, 1996	April 11, 1996	Riocentro	Rio de Janeiro	Brazil
COMDEX/UK '96	April 23, 1996	April 26, 1996	Earls Court Exhibition Centre	London	United Kingdom
COMDEX/Spring '96	June 3, 1996	June 6, 1996	McCormick Place	Chicago	United States
COMDEX/Canada '96	July 10, 1996	July 12, 1996	Metro Toronto Convention Centre	Toronto	Canada
COMDEX/Sucesu-SP South America '96	September 10, 1996	September 13, 1996	Pavilhão de Exposições do Anhembi	São Paulo	Brazil
COMDEX/Asia at Singapore Informatics '96	September 25, 1996	September 27, 1996	Singapore International Convention & Exhibition Center	Singapore	Singapore
COMDEX/SCIB '96	October 8, 1996	October 10, 1996	Palais des Congrès	Montréal	Canada
COMDEX/Fall '96	November 18, 1996	November 22, 1996	Las Vegas Convention Center	Las Vegas	United States
COMDEX/HispanoAmerica '96	December 4, 1996	December 6, 1996	Miami Beach Convention Center	Miami Beach	United States
COMDEX/IT India '96	December 4, 1996	December 7, 1996	Pragati Maidan Convention Center	New Delhi	India
COMDEX/PacRim '97	January 21, 1997	January 23, 1997	Vancouver Convention Centre	Vancouver	Canada
COMDEX/IT Forum France '97	February 3, 1997	February 7, 1997	Paris Expo - Porte de Versailles	Paris	France
COMDEX/China '97	February 25, 1997	March 1, 1997	China International Exhibition Center	Beijing	China
COMDEX/Mexico '97	February 25, 1997	February 28, 1997	Palacio de los Deportes	Mexico City	Mexico
COMDEX/Japan '97	April 8, 1997	April 11, 1997	Makuhari Messe	Tokyo	Japan
COMDEX/Sucesu-Rio '97	April 8, 1997	April 11, 1997	Riocentro	Rio de Janeiro	Brazil
COMDEX/INFOCOM Argentina '97	May 20, 1997	May 23, 1997	Predio Ferial de Palermo	Buenos Aires	Argentina
COMDEX/Spring '97	June 2, 1997	June 5, 1997	Georgia World Congress Center	Atlanta	United States
COMDEX/Canada '97	July 9, 1997	July 11, 1997	Metro Toronto Convention Centre	Toronto	Canada
COMDEX/Korea '97	August 26, 1997	August 30, 1997	COEX Convention & Exhibition Center	Seoul	South Korea
COMDEX/SCIB '97	October 7, 1997	October 9, 1997	Palais des Congrès	Montréal	Canada
COMDEX/Asia at Singapore Informatics '97	October 7, 1997	October 9, 1997	Singapore International Convention & Exhibition Center	Singapore	Singapore
COMDEX/Fall '97	November 17, 1997	November 21, 1997	Las Vegas Convention Center	Las Vegas	United States
COMDEX/IT India '97	December 3, 1997	December 6, 1997	Pragati Maidan Convention Center	New Delhi	India
COMDEX/Miami '97	December 9, 1997	December 11, 1997	Miami Beach Convention Center	Miami Beach	United States
COMDEX/PacRim '98	January 20, 1998	January 22, 1998	Vancouver Convention Centre	Vancouver	Canada
COMDEX/France '98	February 2, 1998	February 6, 1998	Parc de Expositions de Paris	Paris	France
COMDEX/Mexico '98	February 24, 1998	February 27, 1998	Palacio de los Deportes	Mexico City	Mexico
COMDEX/China '98	March 24, 1998	March 27, 1998	China International Exhibition Center	Beijing	China
COMDEX/Sucesu-Rio '98	March 31, 1998	April 2, 1998	Riocentro	Rio de Janeiro	Brazil
COMDEX/Japan '98	April 6, 1998	April 9, 1998	Makuhari Messe	Tokyo	Japan
COMDEX/Spring '98	April 20, 1998	April 23, 1998	McCormick Place	Chicago	United States
COMDEX/INFOCOM Argentina '98	May 19, 1998	May 22, 1998	Predio Ferial de Palermo	Buenos Aires	Argentina
COMDEX/Egypt '98	May 23, 1998	May 26, 1998	Cairo International Conference Centre	Cairo	Egypt
COMDEX/Canada '98	July 8, 1998	July 10, 1998	Metro Toronto Convention Centre	Toronto	Canada
COMDEX/Sucesu-SP Brazil '98	August 31, 1998	September 4, 1998	Pavilhão de Exposições do Anhembi	São Paulo	Brazil
COMDEX/Korea '98	September 8, 1998	September 12, 1998	COEX Convention & Exhibition Center	Seoul	South Korea
COMDEX/Enterprise West '98	September 8, 1998	September 11, 1998	Moscone Center	San Francisco	United States
COMDEX/Miami '98	September 15, 1998	September 17, 1998	Miami Beach Convention Center	Miami Beach	United States
COMDEX/Asia at Singapore Informatics '98	September 23, 1998	September 25, 1998	Singapore International Convention & Exhibition Center	Singapore	Singapore
COMDEX/Enterprise Frankfurt '98	September 28, 1998	September 30, 1998	Messe Frankfurt	Frankfurt	Germany
COMDEX/Enterprise Frankfurt '98	September 28, 1998	October 1, 1998	Messe Frankfurt	Frankfurt	Germany
COMDEX/UK '98	October 6, 1998	October 8, 1998	Earls Court Exhibition Centre	London	United Kingdom
COMDEX/Quebec '98	October 6, 1998	October 8, 1998	Palais des Congrès	Montréal	Canada
COMDEX/Fall '98	November 16, 1998	November 20, 1998	Las Vegas Convention Center	Las Vegas	United States
IT WORLD '98/COMDEX INDIA	December 2, 1998	December 5, 1998	Pragati Maidan Convention Center	New Delhi	India
COMDEX/Enterprise East '98	December 7, 1998	December 11, 1998	Javits Center	New York	United States
COMDEX/Canada West '99	January 11, 1999	January 13, 1999	Vancouver Convention Centre	Vancouver	Canada
COMDEX/IT France '99	February 8, 1999	February 12, 1999	Parc de Expositions de Paris	Paris	France
COMDEX/China '99	March 23, 1999	March 26, 1999	China International Exhibition Center	Beijing	China
COMDEX/Spring '99	April 19, 1999	April 22, 1999	McCormick Place	Chicago	United States
COMDEX/Egypt '99	May 15, 1999	May 18, 1999	Cairo International Conference Centre	Cairo	Egypt
COMDEX/Mexico '99	May 25, 1999	May 28, 1999	World Trade Center	Mexico City	Mexico
COMDEX/INFOCOM Argentina '99	June 1, 1999	June 4, 1999	Predio Ferial de Palermo	Buenos Aires	Argentina
COMDEX/Canada '99	July 14, 1999	July 16, 1999	Metro Toronto Convention Centre	Toronto	Canada
COMDEX/Sucesu-SP Brazil '99	August 16, 1999	August 20, 1999	Pavilhão de Exposições do Anhembi	São Paulo	Brazil
COMDEX/Korea '99	August 24, 1999	August 27, 1999	COEX Convention & Exhibition Center	Seoul	South Korea
COMDEX/Miami '99	September 28, 1999	September 30, 1999	Miami Beach Convention Center	Miami Beach	United States
COMDEX/Quebec '99	October 5, 1999	October 7, 1999	Palais des Congrès	Montréal	Canada
COMDEX/Japan '99	November 9, 1999	November 12, 1999	Makuhari Messe	Tokyo	Japan
COMDEX/Fall '99	November 15, 1999	November 19, 1999	Las Vegas Convention Center	Las Vegas	United States
COMDEX/Israel '99	November 30, 1999	December 2, 1999	Expo Tel Aviv	Tel Aviv	Israel
IT WORLD '99/COMDEX INDIA	December 8, 1999	December 11, 1999	Pragati Maidan Convention Center	New Delhi	India
COMDEX/Canada West 2000	January 19, 2000	January 21, 2000	Vancouver Convention Centre	Vancouver	Canada
COMDEX/Greece 2000	March 16, 2000	March 19, 2000	Helexpo Maroussi	Athens	Greece
COMDEX/Paris 2000	March 28, 2000	March 30, 2000	Paris Expo - Porte de Versailles	Paris	France
COMDEX/Asia at Singapore Informatics 2000	April 5, 2000	April 7, 2000	Singapore International Convention & Exhibition Center	Singapore	Singapore
COMDEX/Saudi Arabia 2000	April 9, 2000	April 13, 2000	Jeddah International Center for Conferences and Exhibition	Jeddah	Saudi Arabia
COMDEX/Spring 2000	April 17, 2000	April 20, 2000	McCormick Place	Chicago	United States
COMDEX/China 2000	April 26, 2000	April 29, 2000	China International Exhibition Center	Beijing	China
COMDEX/INFOCOM Argentina 2000	May 16, 2000	May 19, 2000	La Rural	Buenos Aires	Argentina
COMDEX/Mexico 2000	May 16, 2000	May 19, 2000	World Trade Center	Mexico City	Mexico
COMDEX/Egypt 2000	May 28, 2000	May 31, 2000	Cairo International Conference Centre	Cairo	Egypt
COMDEX/Canada 2000	July 12, 2000	July 14, 2000	Metro Toronto Convention Centre	Toronto	Canada
COMDEX/Sucesu-SP Brazil 2000	August 16, 2000	August 20, 2000	Pavilhão de Exposições do Anhembi	São Paulo	Brazil
COMDEX/Korea 2000	August 23, 2000	August 26, 2000	COEX Convention & Exhibition Center	Seoul	South Korea
ORBIT/COMDEX Europe 2000	September 26, 2000	September 29, 2000	Messe Basel	Basel	Switzerland
COMDEX/Israel 2000	September 26, 2000	September 28, 2000	Tel Aviv Exhibition Grounds	Tel Aviv	Israel
COMDEX/Miami 2000	September 28, 2000	September 30, 2000	Miami Beach Convention Center	Miami Beach	United States
COMDEX/South Africa 2000	October 3, 2000	October 6, 2000	Gallagher Estate	Johannesburg	South Africa
COMDEX/Sydney 2000	October 23, 2000	October 27, 2000	Sydney Convention & Exhibition Centre	Sydney	Australia
COMDEX/Quebec 2000	October 24, 2000	October 26, 2000	Palais des Congrès	Montréal	Canada
COMDEX/Fall 2000	November 13, 2000	November 17, 2000	Las Vegas Convention Center	Las Vegas	United States
IT WORLD 2000/COMDEX INDIA	December 6, 2000	December 9, 2000	Pragati Maidan Convention Center	New Delhi	India
COMDEX/Greece 2001	February 15, 2001	February 18, 2001	Helexpo Maroussi	Athens	Greece
COMDEX/IT France 2001	March 6, 2001	March 9, 2001	Parc de Expositions de Paris	Paris	France
IT 2001/COMDEX Sydney	March 7, 2001	March 9, 2001	Sydney Convention & Exhibition Centre	Sydney	Australia
COMDEX/Canada West 2001	March 13, 2001	March 15, 2001	Vancouver Convention Centre	Vancouver	Canada
COMDEX/Spring 2001	April 2, 2001	April 5, 2001	McCormick Place	Chicago	United States
COMDEX/China 2001	April 4, 2001	April 7, 2001	China International Exhibition Center	Beijing	China
COMDEX/Asia at Singapore Informatics 2001	April 10, 2001	April 12, 2001	Singapore International Convention & Exhibition Center	Singapore	Singapore
COMDEX/Saudi Arabia 2001	April 16, 2001	April 19, 2001	Jeddah International Exhibition Center	Jeddah	Saudi Arabia
IT 2001/COMDEX Brisbane	May 15, 2001	May 17, 2001	Brisbane Convention & Exhibition Centre	Brisbane	Australia
COMDEX/Mexico 2001	May 15, 2001	May 18, 2001	World Trade Center	Mexico City	Mexico
COMDEX/Egypt 2001	May 27, 2001	May 30, 2001	Cairo International Conference Centre	Cairo	Egypt
COMDEX/INFOCOM Argentina 2001	July 3, 2001	July 6, 2001	La Rural	Buenos Aires	Argentina
COMDEX/Canada 2001	July 11, 2001	July 13, 2001	Metro Toronto Convention Centre	Toronto	Canada
COMDEX/Korea 2001	August 23, 2001	August 26, 2001	COEX Convention & Exhibition Center	Seoul	South Korea
COMDEX/Sucesu-SP Brazil 2001	August 28, 2001	August 31, 2001	Pavilhão de Exposições do Anhembi	São Paulo	Brazil
IT 2001/COMDEX Melbourne	September 5, 2001	September 7, 2001	Melbourne Exhibition and Convention Centre	Melbourne	Australia
COMDEX/South Africa 2001	September 11, 2001	September 14, 2001	Gallagher Estate	Johannesburg	South Africa
ORBIT/COMDEX Europe 2001	September 25, 2001	September 28, 2001	Messe Basel	Basel	Switzerland
COMDEX/Israel 2001	October 23, 2001	October 25, 2001	Israel Trade Fairs & Convention Center	Tel Aviv	Israel
COMDEX/Fall 2001	November 12, 2001	November 16, 2001	Las Vegas Convention Center	Las Vegas	United States
COMDEX Quebec 2001	November 27, 2001	November 29, 2001	Palais des Congrès	Montréal	Quebec
COMDEX/Greece 2002	January 17, 2002	January 20, 2002	Helexpo Maroussi	Athens	Greece
COMDEX/Nordic 2002	January 22, 2002	January 24, 2002	Swedish Exhibition & Congress Centre	Gothenburg	Sweden
COMDEX/Spring 2002	March 4, 2002	March 7, 2002	McCormick Place	Chicago	United States
IT COMDEX Sydney 2002	March 5, 2002	March 7, 2002	Sydney Exhibition Centre	Sydney	Australia
COMDEX Vancouver 2002	March 12, 2002	March 14, 2002	Vancouver Convention Centre	Vancouver	Canada
COMDEX IT France 2002	March 26, 2002	March 28, 2002	Paris Expo - Porte de Versailles	Paris	France
COMDEX/Saudi Arabia 2002	April 1, 2002	April 4, 2002	Jeddah International Exhibition Center	Jeddah	Saudi Arabia
COMDEX/China 2002	April 17, 2002	April 20, 2002	China International Exhibition Center	Beijing	China
COMDEX Egypt 2002	May 27, 2002	May 30, 2002	Cairo International Conference Centre	Cairo	Egypt
COMDEX/Canada 2002	July 10, 2002	July 12, 2002	Metro Toronto Convention Centre	Toronto	Canada
COMDEX/Sucesu-SP Brazil 2002	August 18, 2002	August 23, 2002	Pavilhão de Exposições do Anhembi	São Paulo	Brazil
COMDEX/Korea & INTEROP 2002	August 26, 2002	August 29, 2002	COEX Convention & Exhibition Center	Seoul	South Korea
IT 2002/COMDEX Melbourne	September 4, 2002	September 6, 2002	Melbourne Exhibition and Convention Centre	Melbourne	Australia
COMDEX Atlanta 2002	September 9, 2002	September 12, 2002	Georgia World Congress Center	Atlanta	United States
ORBIT/COMDEX Europe 2002	September 24, 2002	September 27, 2002	Messe Basel	Basel	Switzerland
COMDEX Montreal 2002	October 22, 2002	October 24, 2002	Palais des Congrès	Montréal	Canada
COMDEX/Fall 2002	November 18, 2002	November 22, 2002	Las Vegas Convention Center	Las Vegas	United States
COMDEX/Scandinavia 2003	January 14, 2003	January 16, 2003	Swedish Exhibition & Congress Centre	Gothenburg	Sweden
COMDEX/Greece 2003	February 20, 2003	February 23, 2003	Helexpo Maroussi	Athens	Greece
COMDEX/China 2003	April 1, 2003	April 4, 2003	China International Exhibition Center	Beijing	China
FIHT COMDEX 2003	April 1, 2003	April 3, 2003	Paris Expo - Porte de Versailles	Paris	France
COMDEX/Saudi Arabia 2003	April 6, 2003	April 9, 2003	Jeddah International Exhibition Center	Jeddah	Saudi Arabia
COMDEX/Sucesu-SP Brazil 2003	August 17, 2003	August 21, 2003	Pavilhão de Exposições do Anhembi	São Paulo	Brazil
COMDEX/Korea & NetWorld+INTEROP 2003	August 18, 2003	August 21, 2003	COEX Convention & Exhibition Center	Seoul	South Korea
ORBIT/COMDEX Europe 2003	September 24, 2003	September 27, 2003	Messe Basel	Basel	Switzerland
COMDEX/Fall 2003	November 17, 2003	November 20, 2003	Las Vegas Convention Center	Las Vegas	United States
COMDEX/Scandinavia 2004	January 20, 2004	January 22, 2004	Swedish Exhibition & Congress Centre	Gothenburg	Sweden
COMDEX/Saudi Arabia 2004	March 14, 2004	March 17, 2004	Jeddah International Exhibition Center	Jeddah	Saudi Arabia
COMDEX/Korea 2004	August 16, 2004	August 19, 2004	COEX Convention & Exhibition Center	Seoul	South Korea
COMDEX/Sucesu-SP Brazil 2004	August 17, 2004	August 20, 2004	Pavilhão de Exposições do Anhembi	São Paulo	Brazil
ORBIT/COMDEX Europe 2004	September 22, 2004	September 25, 2004	Messe Basel	Basel	Switzerland
COMDEX/Greece 2004	November 2, 2004	November 4, 2004	Athens Metropolitan Expo	Athens	Greece
dte-COMDEX/Greece 2005	November 18, 2005	November 20, 2005	Athens Metropolitan Expo	Athens	Greece

== See also ==
- CES (Consumer Electronics Show) (Las Vegas, Nevada, US)
- CeBIT (Centrum der Büro und Informations Technik) (Hanover, Germany)
- Computex Taipei (Taipei, Taiwan)
- E3 (Los Angeles, California)
