= CNAnime =

Anime convention in Toronto, Canada

CNAnime the Canadian National Anime Expo
- Status: Defunct (merged into Fan Expo Canada)
- Genre: Multi-genre
- Venue: Metro Toronto Convention Centre
- Locations: Toronto, Ontario
- Country: Canada
- Inaugurated: 1998
- Most recent: 2011
- Attendance: 79,000 in 2011 (combined with Fan Expo Canada)
- Organizer: Hobby Star Marketing Inc.
- Filing status: Corporate

Toronto, Ontario, Canada's CNAnime was an annual multigenre fan convention that ran within what is now called Fan Expo Canada. It was founded as the Canadian National Anime Expo in 1998 by Hobby Star Marketing Inc. It was traditionally a three-day event (Friday through Sunday) typically held the weekend before Labour Day during the summer in Toronto, Ontario, Canada, at the Metro Toronto Convention Centre.

Originally showcasing anime, the convention had expanded over the years to include a larger range of pop culture elements, such as cosplay, manga, animation, toys, collectible card games, video games and web entertainment. The convention was the largest of its kind in Canada and among the largest in world, filling the entire South building of the Metro Toronto Convention Centre with over 91,000 attendees in 2012. The CNAnime brand has now been retired as the entire event has been folded into Fan Expo Canada.

Along with panels, seminars, and workshops with anime professionals, there were previews of upcoming feature films, and evening events such as The Masquerade; a costume contest, and the Diamond Distribution Industry Night Dinner and reception for industry professionals only. Traditional events included screening rooms devoted to Japanese animation, with over 175 hours of other programming on all aspects of pop culture.

CNAnime ran within Fan Expo Canada and featured a large floorspace for exhibitors. These included media companies such as movie studios and TV networks, as well as anime, toy, and manga dealers with many top collectibles merchants as well. CNAnime/Fan Expo Canada also included a large autograph area, as well as the Artists' Alley where manga artists can sign autographs and sell or do free sketches.

== History of CNAnime - locations and dates ==
Dates	Location	Attendees (Fan Expo Canada figures)	Notable guests (CNAnime only)	Notes
June 26–28, 1998	Metro Toronto Convention Centre	6778	C.B. Cebulski, Terri Hawkes, Stephanie Morgenstern, Koichi Ohata, Lisa Ortiz, Roland Parliament, and Robert Woodhead	First appearance of CNAnime brand, representing Canadian National Anime Expo.
August 27–29, 1999	Metro Toronto Convention Centre	9620	Mari Iijima and Rachael Lillis.	
August 25–27, 2000	Metro Toronto Convention Centre	12,763	Kunihiko Ikuhara and Chiho Saito	
August 24–26, 2001	Metro Toronto Convention Centre	15,359	Mika Akitaka, Linda Ballantyne, Terri Hawkes, Eric Johnson, Scott McNeil, Stephanie Morgenstern, Roland Parliament, Chris Sabat, and Yumi Touma.	Canadian National Expo master brand first appears.
August 23–25, 2002	Metro Toronto Convention Centre	16,600	Kia Asamiya, Kyle Hebert, Yoshihiro Komada, Shane Law, Alvin Lee, Pat Lee, Roger Lee, Edwin Garcia, Josh Martin, Kirby Morrow, Tommy Ohtsuka, James Ruiz, Erik Sander, Chris Sarracini, Ken Siu-chong, Ramil Sunga, Sigmund Torre, Adrian Tsang, Arnold Tsang, Alan Wang, Gary Yeung, and Simon Yeung.	Titled: Canadian National Expo featuring CNAnime.
August 22–24, 2003	Metro Toronto Convention Centre	20,655	Fred Gallagher, C.B. Cebulski, Dameon Clarke, Brian Drummond, Yoshihiro Komada, Pat Lee, Josh Martin, Tommy Ohtsuka, Chris Rager, and Sean Schemmel.	
August 27–29, 2004	Metro Toronto Convention Centre	27,684	Yoshitoshi Abe, Rob Armstrong] Laura Bailey, C.B. Cebulski, Colleen Clinkenbeard, Edwin Garcia, Erik Ko, Shane Law, Alvin Lee, Pat Lee, Scott McNeil, Joe Ng, Roland Parliament, Rob Ruffolo, Chris Sabat, Erik Sander, Mike Sinterniklaas, Ken Siu-chong, Sigmund Torre, Arnold Tsang, Yasuyuki Ueda, Sam Vincent, Alan Wang and Yasuyuki Ueda.	Masquerade event moves to the John Bassett Theatre and becomes the largest in Canada. Retailer arrested on show floor for selling numerous illegal weapons including throwing stars, nunchaku, one handed crossbows and brass knuckles. The Expo also suffers an hour long black out on Sunday afternoon.
August 26–28, 2005	Metro Toronto Convention Centre	39,753	Angela, Laura Bailey, Richard Ian Cox, Nobuyoshi Habara, Peter Laird, James Maliszewski, Scott McNeil, Takeshi Miyazawa, Kirby Morrow, Roland Parliament, Lucien Soulban, Ken Steacy, Brad Swaile, Pieter Van Hiel and Kalman Andrasofszky.	Attendance reaches facility limit and Toronto Fire Marshall's office halts ticket sales on Saturday afternoon.
September 1–3, 2006	Metro Toronto Convention Centre	42,947	Matt Hill, Aaron Dismuke, Kate Higgins, Yasuhiro Imagawa, Yuri Lowenthal, James Maliszewski, Vic Mignogna, Joe Ng, Rooster Teeth Productions, Ken Steacy, Brad Swaile, Pieter Van Hiel, Travis Willingham and Kalman Andrasofszky.	Canadian National Expo re-branded as Fan Expo Canada. The show outgrows the North Building of the MTCC and moves to the much larger South Building.
August 24–26, 2007	Metro Toronto Convention Centre	43,738	Laura Bailey, Luci Christian, Maile Flanagan, Crispin Freeman, Daisuke Moriyama, Yasuhiro Nightow, Rooster Teeth Productions, Sean Schemmel, Ken Siu-chong] Atsushi Suzumi, Brad Swaile, Veronica Taylor, and J. Torres.	
August 22–24, 2008	Metro Toronto Convention Centre	44,500	Johnny Yong Bosch, Richard Ian Cox, Vic Mignogna, Derek Stephen Prince, Michelle Ruff, and Stephanie Sheh.	
August 28–30, 2009	Metro Toronto Convention Centre	59,000	Colleen Clinkenbeard, Aaron Dismuke, Asaph Fipke, Crispin Freeman, Scott McNeil, Brina Palencia, Derek Stephen Prince, Monica Rial, Brad Swaile, and Lee Tockar.	Fan Expo Canada reveals its first Title Sponsor with Rogers High Speed Internet. Attendance reaches facility limit and Toronto Fire Marshal's office halts ticket sales for two hours on Saturday afternoon.
August 27–29, 2010	Metro Toronto Convention Centre	Over 64,000	Yoshitaka Amano, Ogata Megumi, Vic Mignogna, Johnny Yong Bosch, Brad Swaile, Jamie Marchi, Jason Deline.	Attendance reaches facility limit and Toronto Fire Marshal's office halts ticket sales for four hours on Saturday afternoon.
August 25–28, 2011	Metro Toronto Convention Centre	Over 79,000	Vic Mignogna, Junko Mizuno, Colleen Clinkenbeard, Caitlin Glass, Veronica Taylor, Lance Henriksen, Christopher Sabat, Mike McFarland, and Brad Swaile.	First year running for 4 days, with Thursday added as the new extra day. Operating hours also expanded for each day. Final year running as CNAnime

== Issues ==
Capacity attendance at CNAnime/Fan Expo Canada in 2005 has raised crowding issues. Concerns have been that the event is possibly too big for the Metro Toronto Convention Centre, even though they have moved to the largest halls in the facility. The worry of some fans is that the event will sell out and potential attendees will be denied entry as has happened at similar events such as the New York Comic Con and San Diego Comic-Con.

== Community ==
To strengthen its standing in the community, Hobby Star Marketing, the company that organizes CNAnime and Fan Expo Canada, also has worked with local fan organizations, to strengthen relationships. In 2005, the Hobby Star Marketing instituted a policy of free admission to those twelve years old and younger to encourage young people to be exposed to the content, and hopefully become the next generation of fans. Later that year, Hobby Star Marketing surprised many with a goodwill gesture following the failure of a local competing anime convention. After an event called "Con No Baka" failed to materialize in Toronto, Hobby Star Marketing offered to honour tickets to Con No Baka at their event with no charge to the patrons. Most of this was in response to feedback that the company, were bad corporate citizens, losing touch with the grass roots of fandom.
