= Fan Expo Canada =

Canadian media convention

Coordinates: 43°38′39″N 79°23′12″W

- Former logo
- Status: Active
- Genre: Popular Culture
- Venue: Metro Toronto Convention Centre
- Location: Toronto
- Country: Canada
- Inaugurated: 1995; 31 years ago
- Attendance: 131,647 in 2016
- Organizer: Hobby Star Marketing, Inc. (1995-2013); Fan Expo HQ/Informa Connect (2013-present)
- Website: www.fanexpocanada.com

Fan Expo Canada is an annual speculative fiction fan convention held in Toronto, Ontario. It was founded as the Canadian National Comic Book Expo in 1995 by Hobby Star Marketing Inc. It includes distinctly branded sections, including GX (Gaming Expo) and SFX (Science Fiction Expo), and formerly CNAnime (Canadian National Anime Expo). It is a four-day event (Thursday through Sunday) typically held the weekend before Labour Day during the summer at the Metro Toronto Convention Centre (MTCC).

Originally showcasing comic books, science fiction/fantasy and film/television and related popular arts, Fan Expo Canada has expanded over the years to include a larger range of pop culture and fandom elements, such as horror, anime, manga, animation, toys, collectible card games, video games, and web entertainment. The convention is the largest of its kind in Canada and among the largest in the world, filling the entire North and South Buildings of the MTCC with over 130,000 attendees in 2016.

In 2013, Fan Expo Canada's parent company Hobby Star Marketing was acquired by Informa, which now organizes the event. The company has extended the Fan Expo brand to other conventions organized by the company in Canada and the United States.

== Programming ==
Along with panels, seminars, and workshops with comic book professionals, there are previews of upcoming feature films, portfolio review sessions with top comic book and video game companies, and evening events such as the Masquerade (a costume contest), special screenings and the Diamond Distribution Industry Night Dinner and Reception for industry professionals only.

Traditional events include screening rooms devoted to Japanese animation, gaming, and over 300 hours of other programming on all aspects of comic books and popular culture.

Like most comic book conventions, Fan Expo Canada features a large floorspace for exhibitors. These include media companies such as movie studios and TV networks, as well as comic book dealers and collectibles merchants. Fan Expo Canada also includes a large autographs area, as well as an Artists Alley where comic book artists can sign autographs and sell or do free sketches.

=== Exclusive collectibles ===
In recent years, Fan Expo Canada has become one of the few events that provides selling "exclusive" products to attendees. The vast majority of the exclusives offered at Fan Expo Canada are licensed properties of popular movie, comic book and related characters.

== History, locations, and dates ==
Dates	Location	Attendance	Notable guests	Notes
August 12–13, 1995	Roy Thomson Hall	Est. 1400 or 1500	J. Scott Campbell, Kelley Jones, Joe Jusko, Bill Sienkiewicz, Bernie Wrightson, Brian Hotton, Stephen Platt, Ken Lashley, Ty Templeton	Titled: Canadian National Comic Book Exposition
1996	Holiday Inn on King	Est. 2900	Dale Keown, Adam Hughes, Stuart Immonen, Pat Lee, Ken Lashley, Mike Zeck, Dave Ross	Titled: Canadian National Comic Book Exposition
August 23–24, 1997	Metro Toronto Convention Centre	Est. 3800	Marc Silvestri, Dwayne Turner, Carlos Pacheco, Dale Keown, David Wohl, Rich Buckler	Titled: Canadian National Comic Book Exposition
June 26–28, 1998	Metro Toronto Convention Centre	6778	Joe Quesada, Greg Capullo, Joseph Michael Linsner, Jimmy Palmiotti, Humberto Ramos, Christina Z, Amanda Conner, Chester Brown, Joe Matt, Seth	First appearance of CNAnime brand, representing Canadian National Anime Expo.
August 27–29, 1999	Metro Toronto Convention Centre	9620	Jeri Ryan, Kevin Smith, Kenny Baker, Warwick Davis, Lou Ferrigno, Joe Quesada, Michael Turner, Mark Waid, Leinil Francis Yu, Keu Cha, C. B. Cebulski	First appearance of SFX brand, representing the Canadian National Science Fiction Expo. Ray Park is under contract, but does not attend resulting in a lawsuit.
August 25–27, 2000	Metro Toronto Convention Centre	12,763	Jonathan Frakes, Anthony Head, Roxann Dawson, Hudson Leick, Jeremy Bulloch, Richard Biggs, Peter David, Chris Claremont, Barry Windsor-Smith, Adam Kubert, David Finch (comics), Jae Lee, Brian Michael Bendis, the entire cast of Earth: Final Conflict	Headliner James Marsters cancels due to professional work and is replaced by co-star Anthony Head.
August 24–26, 2001	Metro Toronto Convention Centre	15,359	William Shatner, James Doohan, Peter Mayhew, Traci Lords, Ethan Phillips, Ted Raimi, Ian Churchill, Jeph Loeb, Carlos Pacheco, Mika Akitaka, Scott McNeil	Canadian National Expo master brand first appears.
August 23–25, 2002	Metro Toronto Convention Centre	16,600	Brent Spiner, Nicholas Brendon, Nichelle Nichols, John Billingsley, Billy Dee Williams, Andy Hallett, Adam Kubert, Joe Kubert, John Romita, Jr., John Cassaday, Darwyn Cooke.	Titled: Canadian National Expo featuring SFX and CNAnime.
August 22–24, 2003	Metro Toronto Convention Centre	20,655	Leonard Nimoy, Ray Park (see notes), Adrian Rayment & Neil Rayment Twins (The Matrix), J. August Richards, Connor Trinneer, Denise Crosby, Brian Michael Bendis, Francisco Herrera, Ed McGuinness, Ken Steacy, Darwyn Cooke, Josh Blaylock, Fred Gallagher	Ray Park appears at SFX at his own expense as part of an out of court settlement brought by Hobby Star Marketing Inc. for his non-appearance at SFX 1999.
August 27–29, 2004	Metro Toronto Convention Centre	27,684	Patrick Stewart (see notes), George Takei, Julie Benz, Peter Mayhew, Mercedes McNab, Anthony Montgomery, Aron Eisenberg, Cirroc Lofton, George A. Romero, Tom Savini, Alejandro Jodorowsky, Doug Bradley, Yoshitoshi ABe, Yasuyuki Ueda, George Pérez, Brian Azzarello, Mike Deodato, Rags Morales, Skottie Young, Adam Hughes, David W. Mack, Jill Thompson	Rue Morgue Festival of Fear joins the Canadian National Expo as a feature event. Patrick Stewart postpones due to life-threatening heart condition. He returns to Toronto, September 25, 2004, to make it up to fans. Masquerade event moves to the John Bassett Theatre and becomes the largest in Canada. Retailer arrested on show floor for selling numerous illegal weapons including throwing stars, nunchaku, one handed crossbows and brass knuckles Link to resource site with news video. The Expo also suffers an hour-long black out on Sunday afternoon.
August 26–28, 2005	Metro Toronto Convention Centre	36,753	angela, Elijah Wood, Clive Barker, Gary Gygax, James Marsters, Kevin Sorbo, Crispin Glover, Marina Sirtis, Adam Baldwin, Erica Durance, Margot Kidder, Kenny Baker, Elvira, J. Michael Straczynski, Frank Quitely, Mark Bagley, Greg Land, Neal Adams, Jhonen Vasquez, Peter Laird.	GX Gaming Expo brand first appears as a feature event. Attendance reaches facility limit and Toronto Fire Marshall's office halts ticket sales on Saturday afternoon.
September 1–3, 2006	Metro Toronto Convention Centre	42,947	William Shatner, Leonard Nimoy, Carrie Fisher, Alice Cooper, Linda Blair, James Callis, Gates McFadden, Robert Picardo, Jeffrey Combs, Verne Troyer, Karen Black, Rowdy Roddy Piper, Brian Michael Bendis, Geoff Johns, Ethan Van Sciver, Mike Mignola, Roman Dirge, Josh Middleton	Canadian National Expo re-branded as Fan Expo Canada. The show outgrows the North Building of the MTCC and moves to the much larger South Building. Behavior of show organizers prompt creation of StopHobbystar website (now defunct).
August 24–26, 2007	Metro Toronto Convention Centre	48,167	Adam West, Jonathan Frakes, Tricia Helfer, David Prowse, Malcolm McDowell, Robert Beltran, Dwight Shultz, Dario Argento, Adrienne Barbeau, John Romita, Jr. and John Romita, Sr., Greg Pak, Olivier Coipel, Simone Bianchi, Paul Dini, Steve McNiven, David Finch (comics), Michael Turner, Frank Quitely, Dale Eaglesham.	World Series of Video Games partners with Fan Expo Canada to hold the largest live video game tournament ever held in Canada.
August 22–24, 2008	Metro Toronto Convention Centre	48,167	Buzz Aldrin, Kate Mulgrew, Edward James Olmos, Brent Spiner, Michael Rosenbaum, Sean Astin, Laura Vandervoort, Renee O'Connor, Kristy Swanson, Jeremy Bulloch, Henry Winkler, Michael Easton, Aaron Douglas, Tobe Hooper, John Saxon, Wes Craven, Sid Haig, Brad Dourif, Ruggero Deodato, Tura Satana, Shawnee Smith, Bruce McDonald, Hugh Dillon, Alex Ross. Brian Bolland. Tim Sale, Mark Bagley, Peter David, Matt Fraction, Gabriele Dell'Otto, Marko Djurdjević, Cliff Chiang, Georges Jeanty, Alex Maleev, Keith Giffen, J. Scott Campbell, Adam Hughes, Steve McNiven, Ethan Van Sciver, Kevin Eastman, Bob Layton, Angel Medina (artist), Dexter Vines, Vic Mignogna, Derek Stephen Prince, Johnny Yong Bosch, Michelle Ruff, Richard Ian Cox, Victor Lucas, Jon Jacobs, Donna Mei-Ling Park.	Major League Gaming (MLG) replaces World Series of Video Games as partner for GX feature of Fan Expo Canada. Introduction of the "Hollywood Icon" guest label (for Henry Winkler).
August 28–30, 2009	Metro Toronto Convention Centre	59,245	Leonard Nimoy, Bruce Campbell, Linda Hamilton, Thomas Dekker, Avery Brooks, Beau Bridges, Mary McDonnell, Billy Dee Williams, Walter Koenig, James Kyson Lee, Robert Duncan McNeill, Emma Caulfield, Lou Ferrigno, Dave Thomas, Leslie Nielsen, Larry Thomas, J. Michael Straczynski, Roger Corman, Udo Kier, Barbara Steele, James Duval, Max Brooks, Rick Green, Jack Ketchum, Joe Quesada, Chris Bachalo, Mike Deodato, Jr., Ethan Van Sciver, Ivan Reis, Terry Dodson, David Finch, Olivier Coipel, Len Wein, Bill Sienkiewicz, Stuart Immonen, Yoshinori Ono, Scott McNeil, Crispin Freeman, Brad Swaile, Colleen Clinkenbeard, Aaron Dismuke, Monica Rial, Derek Stephen Prince, Steve Downes, Victor Lucas, Lil Poison, Scott C. Jones, and surprise guest Tobin Bell (unannounced).	Fan Expo Canada reveals its first Title Sponsor with Rogers High Speed Internet. "Hollywood Icon" Celebrity guest Tony Curtis cancels due to health issue. Attendance reaches facility limit and Toronto Fire Marshal's office halts ticket sales for two hours on Saturday afternoon.
August 27–29, 2010	Metro Toronto Convention Centre	64,992	William Shatner, Adam West, Burt Ward, Julie Newmar, James Marsters, Stan Lee, Felicia Day, Sendhil Ramamurthy, Michael Dorn, Peter Mayhew, Bruce Boxleitner, David Blue, Summer Glau, Michelle Forbes, Tahmoh Penikett, Dean Stockwell, Daniel Cudmore, Ernest Borgnine, Ryan Robbins, David Cronenberg, Lance Henriksen, Ken Russell, Bill Moseley, William Forsythe, Heather Langenkamp, El Hijo del Santo, Sherrilyn Kenyon, Anna Silk, Charles Band, Gary Frank, Andy Kubert, Adam Kubert, Olivier Coipel, Steve McNiven, Ethan Van Sciver, Doug Mahnke, Dan DiDio, C. B. Cebulski, Brian Azzarello, Darwyn Cooke, Bob Layton, Tim Bradstreet, Alex Maleev, Ian Churchill, Jill Thompson, Jim Valentino, Chris Sprouse, Yanick Paquette, Cameron Stewart, Jeff Lemire, Yoshitaka Amano, Ogata Megumi, Vic Mignogna, Johnny Yong Bosch, Brad Swaile, Jamie Marchi, Jason Deline, Victor Lucas, Scott Jones, Tommy Tallarico, Jarett Cale, Geoff Lapaire, Ed Greenwood, Robin D. Laws, Casts of Todd and the Book of Pure Evil, Riese, Lost Girl, Dark Rising, Medium Raw: Night of the Wolf, I Spit on Your Grave, Durham County, Pure Pwnage, Electric Playground, and Reviews on the Run. Cancellations: Peter Facinelli (to attend the Emmys), Glenn Danzig (disallowed by Canada Customs due to criminal record), Joan Collins (due to movie role), Leslie Nielsen (due to poor health), Thomas Jane (due to television series shooting).	Attendance reaches facility limit and Toronto Fire Marshal's office halts ticket sales for four hours on Saturday afternoon. Significant backlash from organizers continuing to sell tickets to new patrons while paid attendees locked outside documented by media.
August 25–28, 2011	Metro Toronto Convention Centre	77,840	William Shatner, Hayden Panettiere, Chandler Riggs, Tom Felton, Eliza Dushku, Katee Sackhoff, John Astin, Anthony Daniels, Robert Englund, Lexa Doig, Vic Mignogna, Jeff Smith, Junko Mizuno, Lee Majors, Gary Kurtz, Kevin Sorbo, Michael Shanks, Barbara Eden, Larry Hagman, Michael Biehn, Nichelle Nichols, Marina Sirtis, Ethan Phillips, Malcolm McDowell, John Waters, Elvira, Doug Bradley, Danielle Harris, Tom Savini, Heather Brewer, Robert J. Sawyer, Martin Landau, Colleen Clinkenbeard, Caitlin Glass, Veronica Taylor, Lance Henriksen, Christopher Sabat, Mike McFarland, Brad Swaile, Joe Kubert, Anna Silk, Tony Moore, Tony Daniel, Andy Kubert, Adam Kubert, Stuart Immonen, Steve McNiven, Ethan Van Sciver, Chris Claremont, Dan DiDio, C. B. Cebulski, Steve Epting, Matt Fraction, David Finch, Jason Aaron, James Robinson, Fred Van Lente, Jill Thompson, Dan Slott, Alex Maleev, Yanick Paquette, Dale Eaglesham, Jonathan Hickman, Dale Keown, Jimmy Cheung, Jason Deline, Victor Lucas, Scott Jones, Tommy Tallarico, Jarett Cale, Ed Greenwood, Robin D. Laws, Casts of Todd and the Book of Pure Evil, Lost Girl, Dark Rising, Medium Raw: Night of the Wolf, Pure Pwnage, Electric Playground, and Reviews on the Run and surprise guest Guillermo del Toro (unannounced).	First year running for 4 days, with Thursday added as the new extra day. Operating hours also expanded for each day.
August 23–26, 2012	Metro Toronto Convention Centre	91,118	Neal Adams, Oluniké Adeliyi, Gillian Anderson, Kevin J. Anderson, Kelley Armstrong, Robert Bailey, Jamie Bamber, John Barrowman, Julie Benz, Jon Bernthal, Devon Bostick, Billy Burke, J. Scott Campbell, Greg Capullo, John Carpenter, Colleen Clinkenbeard, K. C. Collins, Amanda Conner, A. J. Cook, Monte Cook, Darwyn Cooke, Richard Crouse, Robin D. Laws, Tony Daniel, William B. Davis, Sergio Di Zio, Nelsan Ellis, Steve Epting, Lou Ferrigno, David Finch, Joe Flanigan, Sean Patrick Flanery, Ron Garney, Adi Granov, Ed Greenwood, Matthew Gray Gubler, Kris Holden-Ried, Alan Howarth, Rick Howland, Dale Keown, Juliet Landau, Robin Laws, Bob Layton, Stan Lee, Wendee Lee, Jeff Lemire, Christopher Lloyd, Francis Manapul, Michael Mando, J. P. Manoux, Jamie Marchi, James Marsters, Rose McGowan, Ed McGuinness, Steve McNiven, Jason Mewes, Vic Mignogna, Tony Moore, Kate Mulgrew, Trina Nishimura, Tom Noonan, Lisa Ortiz, Carlos Pacheco, David Paetkau, Zoie Palmer, Jimmy Palmiotti, Yanick Paquette, Dan Parent, David Prowse, Frank Quitely, Norman Reedus, John Rhys-Davies, Esad Ribić, Julian Richings, John A. Russo, Chris Sarandon, Anna Silk, Dan Slott, Kevin Smith, Ksenia Solo, Chris Sprouse, Amanda Tapping, J. Michael Tatum, Veronica Taylor, Jill Thompson, Tony Todd, Elias Toufexis, Alan Tudyk, Bob Tyrrell, Ethan Van Sciver, Nana Visitor, Billy West, Booker T, Brentalfloss. Surprise guest Sarah Wayne Callies (unannounced). Attending Casts from Arrow, Criminal Minds, Continuum, Flashpoint, Dead Before Dawn, Revolution (TV series), Lost Girl, A Little Bit Zombie, Todd and the Book of Pure Evil, among others.	Long-time attendees Rob Bridges and Amy Banman are legally married at Fan Expo Canada in a wedding ceremony open to all attendees. Another long time attendee, who met a woman at Fan Expo Canada last year through Speed Dating, proposes Marriage to his girl during their return and (spoiler) she responses with "Yes." (Check 2012 Media links below to see actual video of the event). Second year running for 4 days. Operating hours were shortened by one hour each day from previous year.
August 22–25, 2013	Metro Toronto Convention Centre	112,640	Stan Lee, Hulk Hogan, Nathan Fillion, Zachary Quinto, Karl Urban, Norman Reedus, Michael Rooker, Laurie Holden, Steven Yeun, Ron Perlman, Carrie Fisher, Slash, David Hasselhoff, Gina Torres, Alice Cooper, Richard Dean Anderson, Colin Baker, Stephen Amell, Ian McDiarmid, George Takei, Nichelle Nichols, Todd McFarlane, James Hong, Luke Perry, Jason Priestley, Dean Cain, Linda Hamilton, Shawn Ashmore, Aaron Ashmore, Max Brooks, Chumlee, Tara Strong, Cathy Weseluck, Andrea Libman, Vic Mignogna, Bobby Orr, Joe Montana, Joe Sakic, Martin Brodeur, Gordie Howe, Eric Bischoff, Chris Chelios, Red Kelly, Norm Ullman, Doug Gilmour, Roberto Alomar, Paul Molitor, Tony Fernández, John LeClair, Rick Vaive, James Reimer, Eddie Shack, Rudy Ruettiger, Connor McDavid, Cory Conacher, Ron Turcotte, Tracy Ham, Joe Murphy, Ben Johnson, Chad Kackert, Marcus Ball. Attending Casts from Lost Girl, The Listener, Bitten, Being Human, Orphan Black, Storage Wars: Canada, Defiance, Murdoch Mysteries, Warehouse 13	Cancellations: Katey Sagal, Morena Baccarin, Jeffery Combs, Lena Headey, Rickey Henderson, and Jake Gardiner. Convention expanded to encompass both North and South buildings. Sports added in the North building as a separate event.
August 28–31, 2014	Metro Toronto Convention Centre	127,995	Neal Adams, Stephen Amell, Aaron Ashmore, Brian Azzarello, Steve Blum, Bruce Campbell, Lauren Cohan, Arthur Darvill, John DiMaggio, Ivy Doomkitty, Robert Englund, Steve Epting, Sherilyn Fenn, Nathan Fillion, Ed Greenwood, Danai Gurira, Yaya Han, Jon Heder, Hulk Hogan, Laurie Holden, Kris Holden-Ried, Hélène Joy, Adam Kubert, Andy Kubert, Heather Langenkamp, Sheryl Lee, Stan Lee, Andrea Libman, Victor Lucas, Vic Mignogna, Tony Moore, David Morrissey, Jessica Nigri, Trina Nishimura, Edward James Olmos, Ray Park, Ted Raimi, Efren Ramirez, Norman Reedus, Michael Rooker, Chris Sabat, John Saxon, William Shatner, Anna Silk, Dan Slott, Matt Smith, Ian Somerhalder, Chris Sprouse, Tabitha St. Germain, Patrick Stewart, Trish Stratus, Veronica Taylor, Meg Turney, Leeanna Vamp, Laura Vandervoort, Hynden Walch, Burt Ward, Cathy Weseluck, Adam West, Ray Wise, Elijah Wood, Bernie Wrightson, Brentalfloss. Attending casts included: Doctor Who, Batman, Adventure Time, The Walking Dead, Bitten, Killjoys, Lost Girl, Murdoch Mysteries, Prisoners of Gravity, Total Drama Island and My Little Pony.	Fan Expo Canada's twentieth annual event. Sports feature was removed from 2014 edition and replaced by Cosplay guests and events. Star Wars Rebels World Premiere took place on Friday, August 29 in the John Bassett Theatre. Pop singer Lights (musician) attends and hosts the World Premiere of her upcoming release Little Machines. After-hours extra ticketed events included: The Two Captains with William Shatner and Patrick Stewart on stage together, The Cast of Doctor Who with Matt Smith, Arthur Darvill and Karen Gillan (cancelled). Breakfast with Stan Lee and The Fan Expo Official Live Rock Party, which guest Edward James Olmos and Efren Ramirez ended up on stage performing an impromptu musical set.: Olmos and Ramirez Rock Fan Expo, August 29, 2014.
September 3–6, 2015	Metro Toronto Convention Centre	128,147	Christian Slater, Danny Trejo, Neve Campbell, Jeffery Combs, Gillian Anderson, Norman Reedus, Steve Blum, Tom Kenny, Tara Strong, Troy Baker, Grey DeLisle, Jeremy Shada, Jeri Ryan, Robert Picardo, Ethan Phillips, Mike Tyson, Lennie James, Chandler Riggs, Sean Patrick Flanery, Zach Galligan, Jenna Coleman, David Della Rocco, Ajay Fry, Morgan Hoffman, Teddy Wilson, Sam Maggs, George A. Romero, Tom Felton, Hayley Atwell, Tom Savini, Rupert Grint, Robin Lord Taylor, Ming-Na Wen, Amy Acker, Jason Momoa, Karen Gillan, Billy Dee Williams, Malcolm McDowell, Orlando Jones, Graham McTavish, Dr. Marc Okrand, James and Oliver Phelps, Skeet Ulrich.	Cancellations: Bonnie Wright, Kate Mulgrew, Tyler Posey, Billie Piper, Jennifer Morrison
September 1–4, 2016	Metro Toronto Convention Centre	131,647	Mark Hamill, Stan Lee, Elden Hensen, Charlie Cox, William Shatner, Nichelle Nichols, George Takei, Kevin Smith, Jason Mewes, Adam West, Burt Ward, John Barrowman, Christopher Lloyd, Morena Baccarin, Alex Kingston, John Cusack, Joan Cusack, Alan Tudyk, Hayley Atwell, Brent Spiner, Kate Mulgrew, Sonequa Martin-Green, Micheal Cudlitz, Scott Wilson, Jack Gleeson, Katie Cassidy, Andrea Libman, Colleen Clinkenbeard, Veronica Taylor, Vic Mignogna, Linda Ballantyne, Katie Griffin, Susan Roman, Toby Proctor, Ron Rubin, Jill Frappier, Sean Schemmel, Eric Vale, Kevin Conroy, Rob Paulsen, Maurice LaMarche, Bill Farmer, David Hayter, Charles Martinet, William Salyers	Cancellations: Sigourney Weaver, Jon Bernthal, Matthew Lewis (actor), Cary Elwes, Vivica A. Fox, Esad Ribic, Eduardo Sanchez, Dan Myrick, Chris Sabat
August 31 - September 3, 2017	Metro Toronto Convention Centre		Stephen Amell, John Barrowman, Nick Bradshaw, Brentalfloss, Sarah Wayne Callies, Bruce Campbell, Greg Capullo, Tom Cavanagh, Charlet Chung, Colleen Clinkenbeard, Richard Comely, Anthony Daniels, Felicia Day, Rob DenBleyker, Kara Eberle, Nathan Fillion, Dave Filoni, Josh Grelle, Todd Haberkorn, Jennifer Hale, Chad Hardin, David Hayter, Anthony Head, Jason Isaacs, Phil Jimenez, Amy Jo Johnson, Doug Jones (actor), Maurice LaMarche, Erik Larsen, Jae Lee, Jim Lee, Vanessa Marshall, Sonequa Martin-Green, Gaten Matarazzo, Ed McGuinness, Caleb McLaughlin, Steve McNiven, Jason Mewes, Vic Mignogna, Amanda C. Miller, Bob Morley, Jessica Nigri, Nolan North, Paige O'Hara, Bryce Papenbrook, Yanick Paquette, Dan Parent, Khary Payton, Billie Piper, Eric Powell (comics), Humberto Ramos, David Ramsey, Norman Reedus, Marco Rudy, Fernando Ruiz, Chris Sabat, Sean Schemmel, Matt Smith (actor), Brian Stelfreeze, Catherine Tate, James Arnold Taylor, Ty Templeton, Cerina Vincent, Carol Zara, Arryn Zech, Mike Zeck	Cancellations: Troy Baker, Victor Garber, Karen Gillan, Matthew Lewis (actor), James Marsters, Paul Wesley
August 30 - September 2, 2018	Metro Toronto Convention Centre		Michael J Fox, Jason Momoa, Evangeline Lilly, Triple H, The Miz, Charlotte Flair, AJ Styles, Paul Wesley, Ian Somerhalder, Lucy Lawless, Rob Schneider, Cassie Steele, Jake Epstein, Miriam McDonald, Stefan Brogren, Shane Kippel, Pat Mastroianni, Mark Sheppard, Joe Flanigan, Rose McIver, Renee O'Connor, Jennifer Morrison, Karen Gillan, William Shatner, Richard Dean Anderson, Amy Jo Johnson, Jason David Frank, Christopher Lloyd, Tom Wilson, Lea Thompson, Cary Elwes, Chris Sarandon, Wallace Shawn, Tanya Allen, Michael Kevin Pare, Robin Lord Taylor, Austin Amelio, Tom Payne, Billy Zane, Emma Dumont, Gary Lockwood, Keir Dullea, Sonequa Martin-Green, Doug Jones, Anthony Rapp, Anson Mount, Mary Wiseman, Shazad Latif, Thom Allison, Kelly McCormack, Sean Baek, Atticus Mitchell, Rob Stewart, Gavin Fox, Patrick Garrow, Adam Barken, Michelle Lovretta, Melanie Scrofano, Dominique Provost-Chalkley, Tim Rozon, Varun Saranga, Steven Ogg	Cancellations: Jeff Goldblum, Ray Park, Joe Keery, Gregg Sulkin, China Anne McClain, Nafessa Williams, Cress Williams, Peter Mayhew, Billy Dee Williams
August 22–25, 2019	Metro Toronto Convention Centre		Sean Astin, Peter Capaldi, Luci Christian, Greg Cipes, Denise Crosby, Peter Cullen, Jason Deline, Jonathan Frakes, Brendan Fraser, Summer Glau, Jeff Goldblum, Zachary Levi, Rachael Lillis, Amanda C. Miller, Edward James Olmos, Bryce Papenbrook, Michael Rosenbaum, Sean Schemmel, Tara Strong, Eric Stuart, Patricia Summersett, Veronica Taylor, Karl Urban, Laura Vandervoort, Cristina Vee, Frank Welker, Tom Welling	Cancellations: David Harbour, Jason Momoa, Patrick Warburton, Rainn Wilson
August 25–28, 2022	Metro Toronto Convention Centre	Over 140,000	Joseph Quinn, Jamie Campbell Bower, Finn Wolfhard, Grace Van Dien, William Shatner, Abby Trott, Aleks Le, Anthony Daniels, Billy Boyd, Billy West, Brent Spiner, Brian O'Halloran, Bruce McCulloch, Caity Lotz, Carl Weathers, Carolina Ravassa, Charlie Hunnam, Chloé Hollings, Dave Foley, David Hayter, David Matranga, Dominic Monaghan, Elijah Wood, Elizabeth Tulloch, Emilio Rivera, Giancarlo Esposito, Jason Liebrecht, Jason Mewes, Jeff Anderson, Jes Macallan, Jessie T. Usher, Karen Fukuhara, Katee Sackhoff, Kevin MacDonald, Kevin Smith, Kira Buckland, Laz Alonso, LeVar Burton, Mark McKinney, Matthew Lewis, Michael Rooker, Monica Rial, Nathan Mitchell, Nick Wolfhard, Nolan North, Paige O'Hara, Rob Paulsen, Robert Englund, Ryan Hurst, Scott Thompson, Sean Astin, Steve Blum, Theo Rossi, Tomer Capone, Trevor Fehrman, Troy Baker, Tyler Hoechlin, Zach Aguilar	Cancellations: Chris Sabat, Justin Briner, Sean Schemmel, Ming-Na Wen, Jessica Darrow, Ashley Eckstein, Chris Sarandon, Lana Parilla, Martin Kove, Gina Carano, William Zabka, Jacob Bertrand, Peyton List, Kevin Conroy
August 24–27, 2023	Metro Toronto Convention Centre	Over 135,000	Stephan Amell, Leslie David Baker, Dana Barron, Brian Baumgartner, Jodi Benson, Christie Brinkley, Jon Bernthal, Chevy Chase, Hayden Christensen, Gwendoline Christie, Charlie Cox, Peter Cullen, Vincent D'Onofiro, Zack Aguilar, Simone Di Meo, Ashley Eckstein, Neve Campbell, Jason Fabok, Kate Flannery, Kellen Goff, Harvey Guillén, Anthony Michael Hall, Logic, Kathleen Herles Richard Horvitz, Michelle Hurd, Nadij Jeter, Jeff Lemire, Zachary Levi, Ryan Colt Levy, Matthew Lillard, Ralph Macchio, Gates McFadden, Brandon Mclnnis, Steve McNiven, Frank Miller, Shameik Moore, Anson Mount, Sarah Natochenny, Yuji Okumoto, Stephanie Panisello, Lana Parrilla, Ethan Peck, Joe Quesada, Christina Ricci, Brandon Rogers, Christopher Sabat, Sharon & Bram, Megan Shipman, Ian Sinclair, Fred Tatasciore, Todd Stashwick, J. Michael Tatum, James Arnold Taylor, Alexis Tipton, Danny Trejo, Skeet Ulrich, Natalie Van Sistine, Frank Welker, Ming-Na Wen, Sarah Wiedenheft, William Zabka, Susie Yeung	Cancelations: Millie Bobby Brown, Mark Allard Will, Donny Cates, John Giang Rossi Gifford, Rafael Grampá, Paul Walter Hauser, Guillem March, Sam Raimi, Emily Bett Rickards, Mark Simpson, Ty, Templeton, Joshua Williamson, Eilane Will, Bonnie Wright
August 22–25, 2024	Metro Toronto Convention Centre	Over 135,000	Dee Bradley Baker, Corbin Bleu, Morena Baccarin, Kalman Andrasofszky, Rodney Barnes, Simone Bianchi, Gina Carano, Steve Burns, Colleen Clinkenbeard, Rob Paulsen, Felicia Day, Rosario Dawson, Josh Dela Cruz, Simone Di Meo, Mike del Mundo, Ashley Eckstein, Malie Flanagan, Gerry Duggan, Jennifer Hale, Marc Guggenheim, Lucas Grabeel, Butch Hartman, Andrew Herr, Helen Hunt, Tim Jacobus, Geoff Johns, Tyler Johnston, Maurice LaMarche, Ryan Colt Levy, Simu Liu, Dolph Lundgren, Kevin Maguire, Francis Manapul, Charles Martinet, Dave McCaig, Rose McGowan, Ben McKenzie, Steve McNiven, Christopher Mintz-Plasse, Cameron Monaghan, Phil Morris, Temuera Morrison, Michelle Mylett, Neil Newbon, Cary Nord, Alex Organ, Yanick Paquette, Dan Parent, Donovan Patton, Dylan Playfair, Christopher Sabat, Nicola Scott, Megan Shipman, Kate Siegel, Marc Silvestri, Mike Smith, Ken Steacy, Ryan Stegman, Tara Strong, Patricia Summersett, Ty Templeton, Larry Thomas, Frank Tieri, Marcus To, Peter Tomasi, Marisa Tomei, Danny Trejo, John Paul Tremblay, Natalie Van Sistine, Patrick Warburton, Robb Wells, Sarah Wiedenheft, Joe Wos, Jim Zub, Mike Flanagan	Cancelations: Zack Aguilar, Arthur Adams, Justin Briner, Sofia Boutella, Don Bluth, John Cleese, Sofia Boutella, Joyce Chin, Holly Marie Combs, Keith David, Richard Comely, Grey DeLisle, Jonathan Frakes, Gary Frank, Faith Erik Hicks, Leonard Krik, Wayne Knight, Gisèle Lagacé, Jae Lee, Jeff Lemire, Brad Meltzer, Bill Morrison, Jason Priestley, Eli Roth, Roger Craig Smith, Joonas Suotamo, Alan Tudyk, Shannen Doherty (Cancelled due to her death)
August 21–24, 2025	Metro Toronto Convention Centre	Over 125,000	Arthur Adams, Jason Aaron, Troy Baker, Greg Baldwin, Tia Ballard, Dante Basco, John Boyega, Alex Brightman, Mark Brooks, George Buza, Tim Daly, Alyson Court, Jack DeSena, Catherine Disher, Simone Di Meo, Cal Dodd, Tim Dowine, Peter Facinelli, Erica Durance, Mike Tyson, Micheal J. Fox, Mandip Gill, David Giuntoli, Ashley Greene, Todd Haberkorn, Terri Hawkes, Erika Henningsen, Richard Horvitz, Tyler Hoechlin, David Kaye, Nadji Jeter, Kristin Kreuk, Erica Lindbeck, Jim Lee, Mela Lee, Juliette Lewis, Christopher Lloyd, Heathe Locklear, Yuri Lowenthal, Deven Mack, Kellan Lutz, Faye Mata, David Matranga, Ewan McGregor, Steve McNiven, Bill Morrison, Michaela Jill Murphy, George Newbern, Neil Newbon, Nolan North, Ron Perlman, Bryce Pinkham, Tara Platt, Jackson Rathbone, Blake Roman, Michael Rosenbaum, Brandon Routh, Jad Saxton, William Shatner, Hailee Steinfeld, Sonny Strait, Matthew Sussman, Amir Talai, Catherine Tate, Ty Templeton, Elizabeth Tulloch, Laura Vandervoort, Tom Welling, Claudia Wells, Lenore Zann, Jim Zub, Micheal Cudlitz, Sting, Trish Stratus, Morgana Ignis, Hudson Thames,	Cancelations: Aiden Scott, Vivian Nixon, Lea Thompson, Cristina Vee, Jodie Whittaker, Craig Kyle, David Lafuente, Satoshi Shiki, Dan Slott, David Messina, Arthur Suydam, Paolo Villanelli,

Fan Expo 2020 and 2021 were cancelled due to the COVID-19 pandemic.

== Attractions ==
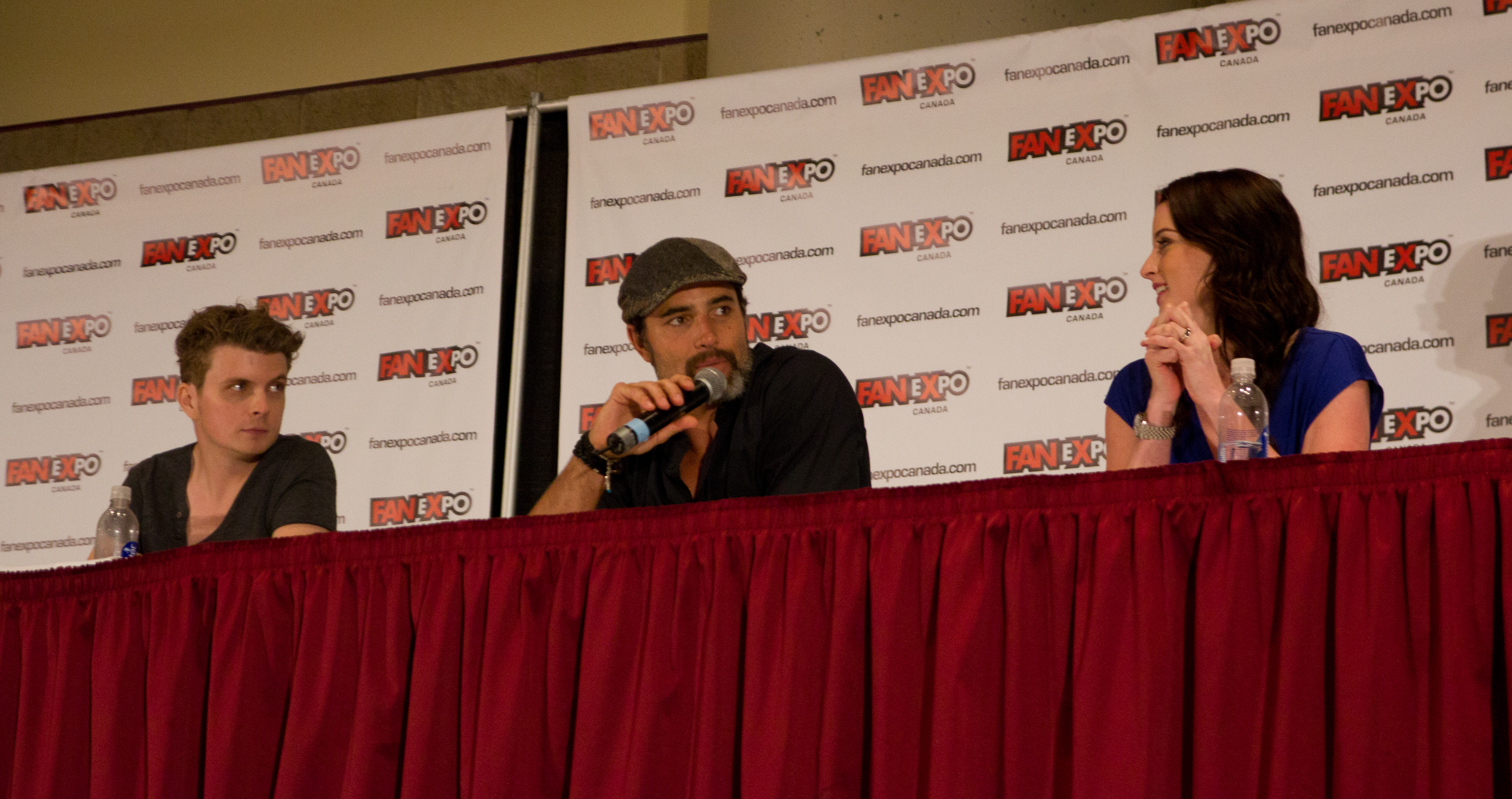
Continuum panel at the 2012 Expo.

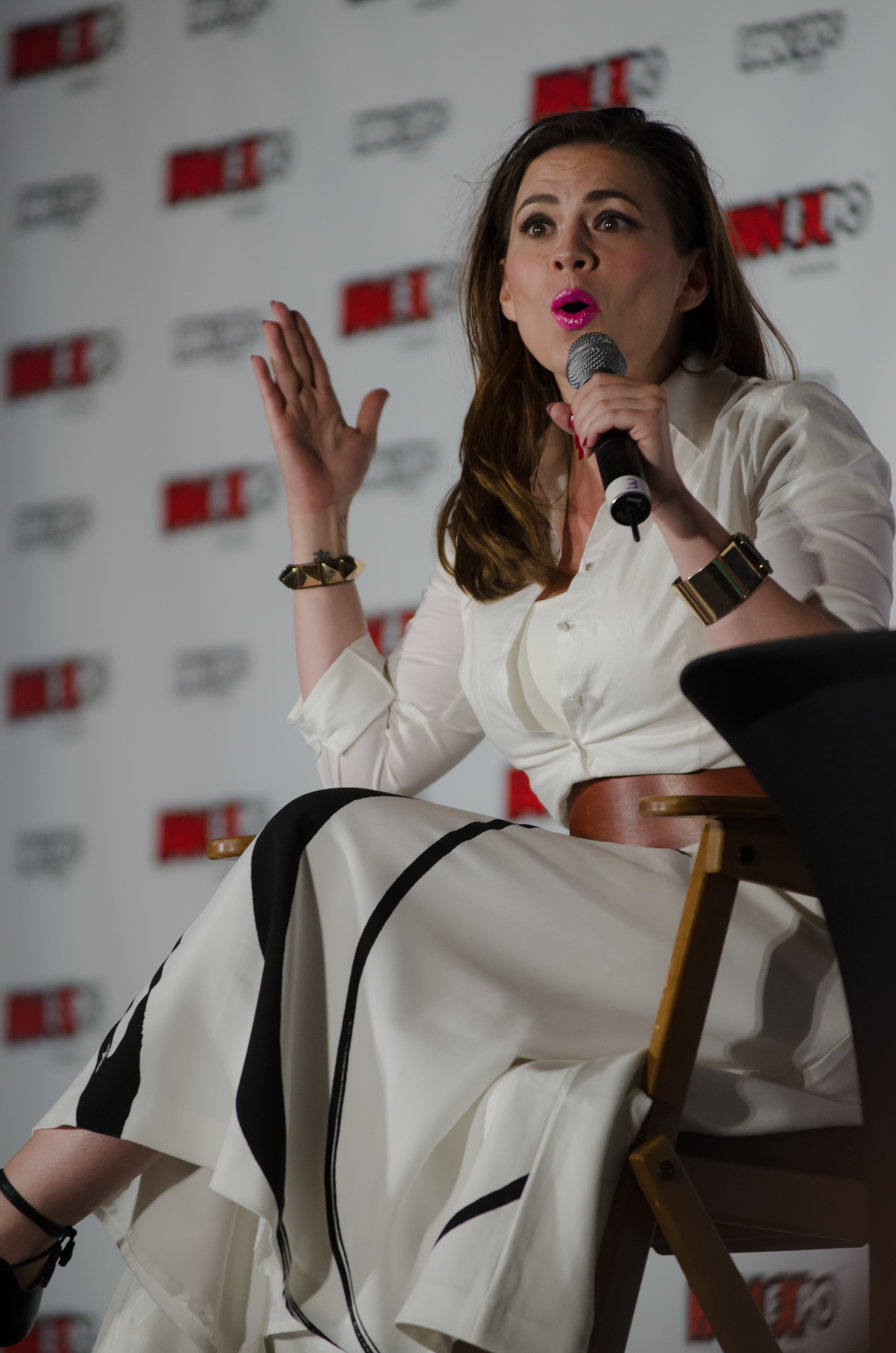
Hayley Atwell Q&A panel at the 2015 Expo.

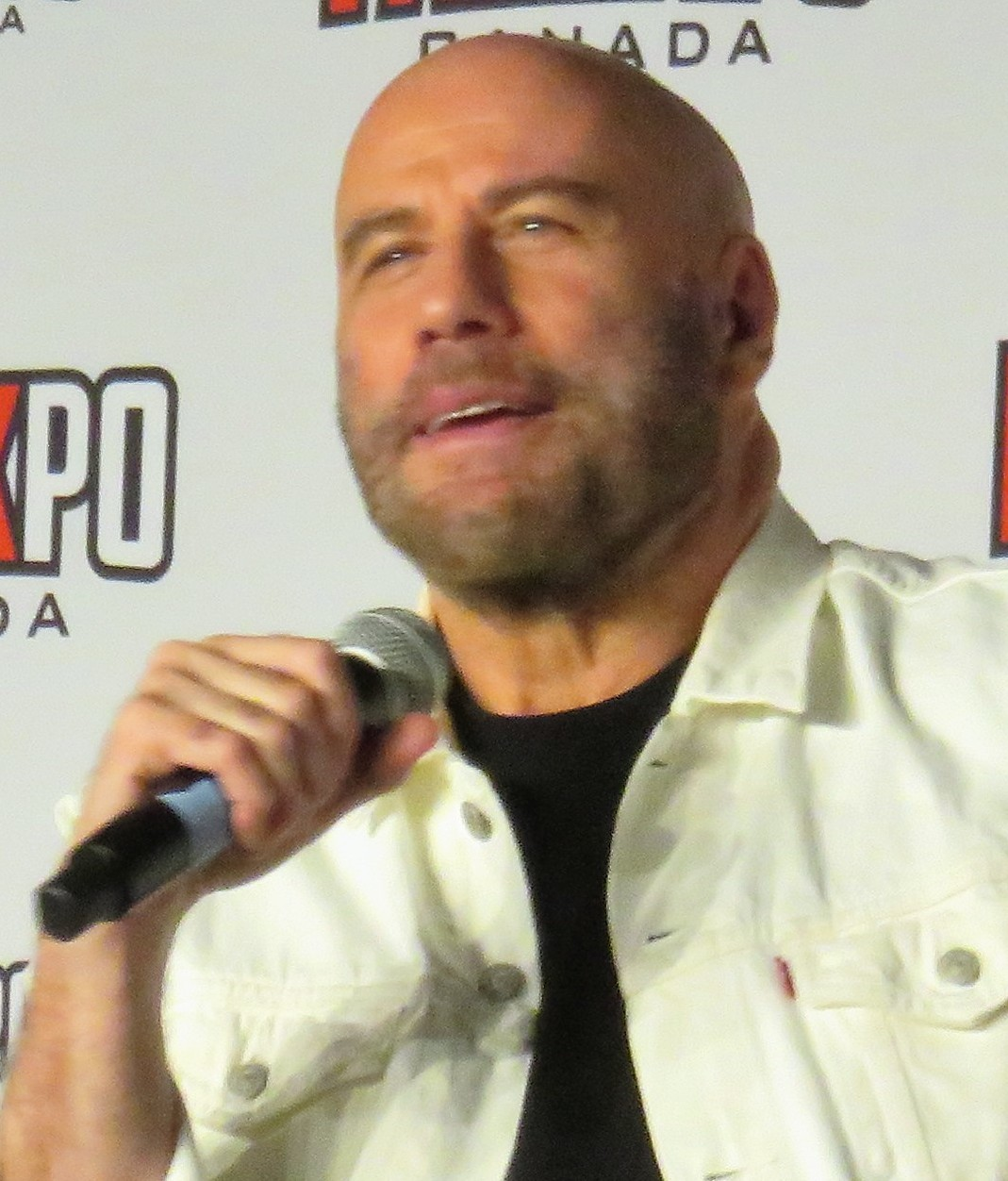
John Travolta Q&A panel at Fan Expo in Toronto August 2019.

Fan Expo Canada is the site of many unique attractions that include Exclusive Pre-screenings and live presentations of upcoming television series and feature films, often including live introductions from the Directors, Producers and Cast members. Some recent projects featured at Fan Expo Canada included the television series:

- Revolution cast Billy Burke, Tracy Spiridakos and Giancarlo Esposito
- Arrow cast Stephen Amell, Willa Holland, Colin Donnell and Katie Cassidy
- Criminal Minds cast A. J. Cook and Matthew Gray Gubler
- Flashpoint cast David Paetkau, Sergio Di Zio and Oluniké Adeliyi
- entire cast for Bitten
- entire casts and producers for Continuum, Dead Before Dawn and Lost Girl
- Harry Potter Reunion with Tom Felton, Rupert Grint and James and Oliver Phelps

In 2012, for the first time ever, Fan Expo Canada was the site of a wedding. Two longtime Fan Expo attendees were married in front of a live audience of thousands of fans on the afternoon of August 24. There was also a proposal of marriage that took place between two attendees on the afternoon of August 26. The engaged couple credited Fan Expo Canada's Nerd Speed Dating event from the previous year in finding one another.

Some attractions at Fan Expo Canada have become standard from year to year due to their continued popularity. Some of these attractions include the aforementioned Speed Dating, Steampunk activities, Web series presentations, Star Wars sessions provided by the 501st Legion, Lolita fashion and others.

== Issues ==
Capacity attendance at Fan Expo Canada in 2005 has raised crowding issues. Concerns have been that the event is possibly too big for the Metro Toronto Convention Centre, even though they have moved to the largest halls in the facility. The worry of fans is that the event will sell out and potential attendees will be denied entry as has happened at similar events such as Anime North, the New York Comic Con and San Diego Comic-Con.

The 2010 event left thousands of fans standing outside as capacity became an issue, many waiting several hours for re-entry. At one point during Saturday afternoon organizers announced (to a small group by the doors) that they would not be letting anyone else in, including those who had purchased tickets in advance, but the majority of fans remained unaware of this and continued to line up in ignorance until word-of-mouth reached them. Eventually they announced that they would be staying open an extra hour to try to accommodate the lines, though many had waited for more than 2 hours for re-entry.

Due to additional space, more staff, a new advance ticketing system, expanded hours and the additional day added to the event, capacity issues were avoided in 2011.

In recent years, HSM has cleaned up their organization and become more respectful to attendees of their fan-based events. After the capacity issue at Fan Expo 2010 and extending the event, CEO and President Aman Gupta released an apology statement to the fans, and stated that while no refunds would be made under any circumstances, the South Building of the Metro Toronto Convention Centre, which had been the location in previous years, was booked immediately for the 2011 edition. Public relations employees at Hobby Star also contacted as many of the fans who had expressed their dissatisfaction, gathering feedback on the convention and expressing personal apologies.

In 2026, fans once again raised concerns about overcrowding after several attendees were allegedly injured, hospitalized, and trampled. Fan Expo Canada allegedly continued to sell tickets for entry after 3pm & 4pm after Saturday All-Day passes were already sold out. A petiton was created on Change.org to make Fan Expo Canada stop overselling tickets, and address the fans complaints after several weeks of not mentioning the concerns.

== Criticism ==
Some of the negative aspects described by fans is the overpricing of the conventions, including entry fees, merchandise, autographs and poor services. Canadian journalist and book writer Jonathan Kay, who was an attender at the convention with his daughters, criticized the high prices charged to fans for photo ops and autographs, arguing them to be unjust. He gave the opinion that it was an undignified way to make a living and that "celebrity worship is the lowest common denominator in popular culture".
