= List of convention and exhibition centres in Canada =

There are several convention centres in Canada. Traditionally there is a distinction in the Canada between convention centres for meetings and those for exhibitions/trade shows. Over the past decades this distinction has become blurred, as exhibition facilities have added meeting rooms and meeting centred venues have opened exhibition halls. Also, most of the bigger hotels have built meeting rooms, some of them for large scale (international) gatherings.

The following list is sorted by province:

== Alberta ==
- BMO Centre (Calgary)
- Calgary Telus Convention Centre (Calgary)
- Edmonton Convention Centre (Edmonton)
- Edmonton Expo Centre (Edmonton)
- Government House (Edmonton)

== British Columbia ==
- BC Place (Vancouver)
- Fraser Valley Trade and Exhibition Centre (Abbotsford)
- Penticton Trade and Convention Centre (Penticton)
- Vancouver Convention Centre (Vancouver)
- Victoria Conference Centre (Victoria)

== Manitoba ==
- RBC Convention Centre Winnipeg

== New Brunswick ==
- Fredericton Convention Centre (Fredericton Capital Region, NB)
- Moncton Events Centre (Moncton)

== Newfoundland and Labrador ==
- St. John's Convention Centre (St. John's)

== Nova Scotia ==
- Alderney Landing (Downtown Dartmouth)
- Halifax Convention Centre (Halifax)
- Halifax Exhibition Centre (Halifax)

== Ontario ==
- Exhibition Place (Toronto)
  - Beanfield Centre
  - Enercare Centre
- EY Centre (Ottawa)
- Government Conference Centre (Ottawa)
- Hamilton Convention Centre (Hamilton)
- International Centre (Mississauga)
- Kingbridge Centre (King City)
- Metro Toronto Convention Centre (Toronto)
  - Rogers Centre
- Muskoka Bible Centre (Huntsville)
- Niagara Falls Convention Centre (Niagara Falls)
- RBC Place London (London)
- Shaw Centre (Ottawa)
- Toronto Congress Centre (Toronto)

== Quebec ==
- Centre de foires de Sherbrooke (Sherbrooke)
- Centre des congrès de Québec (Quebec City)
- Centre des congrès de Saint-Hyacinthe (Saint-Hyacinthe)
- Centrexpo Cogeco (Drummondville)
- Centre de foires de Québec (Quebec City)
- Lévis Centre des congrès (Lévis)
- Palais des congrès de Gatineau (Gatineau)
- Palais des congrès de Montréal (Montreal)
- Place Bonaventure (Montreal)

== Saskatchewan ==
- Regina Exhibition Association Ltd. REAL (1,000,00 Square Feet of space)
  - Welcome to the REAL District
- TCU Place (Saskatoon)

== See also ==
- Annual events in Canada
- List of convention and exhibition centres
- List of convention centers named after people
