= Messe Basel =

Exhibition center in Basel, Switzerland

- Messe Basel
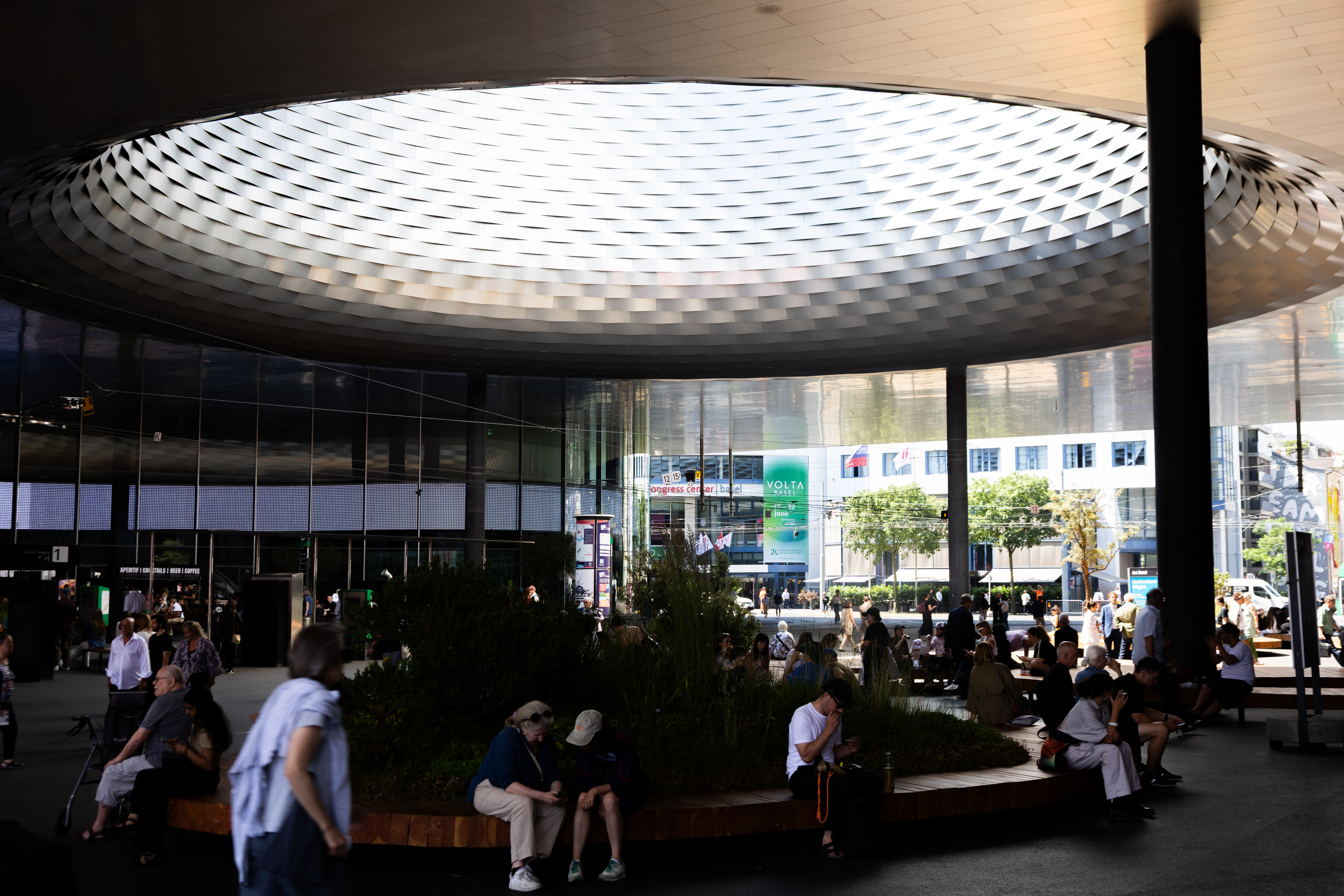
- Messe Basel during Art Basel 2025

General information
- Address: Messepl. 10, 4005
- Town or city: Basel
- Country: Switzerland
- Coordinates: 47.56383056226937°N 7.600231021745698°E

Messe Basel is an exhibition center located in the Messeplatz of Basel, Switzerland.

== History ==
Redesigned with a "twisted aluminum" body by Herzog & de Meuron, the Messe Basel unveiled two renovated halls, along with an extension, in April 2013 and has since served as an exhibition venue for several events including but not limited to Art Basel and the World Watch and Jewelry Show. Consisting of three "ten-metre-high halls on top of one another," the ground floor can host events with upwards of 2,500 attendees, along with two additional exhibition spaces above.

In anticipation of Art Basel 2025, Berlin-based artist Katharina Grosse painted the outdoor work, CHOIR, along the halls of Messe Basel and the surrounding Messeplatz.
