= China International Exhibition Center =

Convention center in Beijing, China

Coordinates: 39.9624°N 116.4435°E

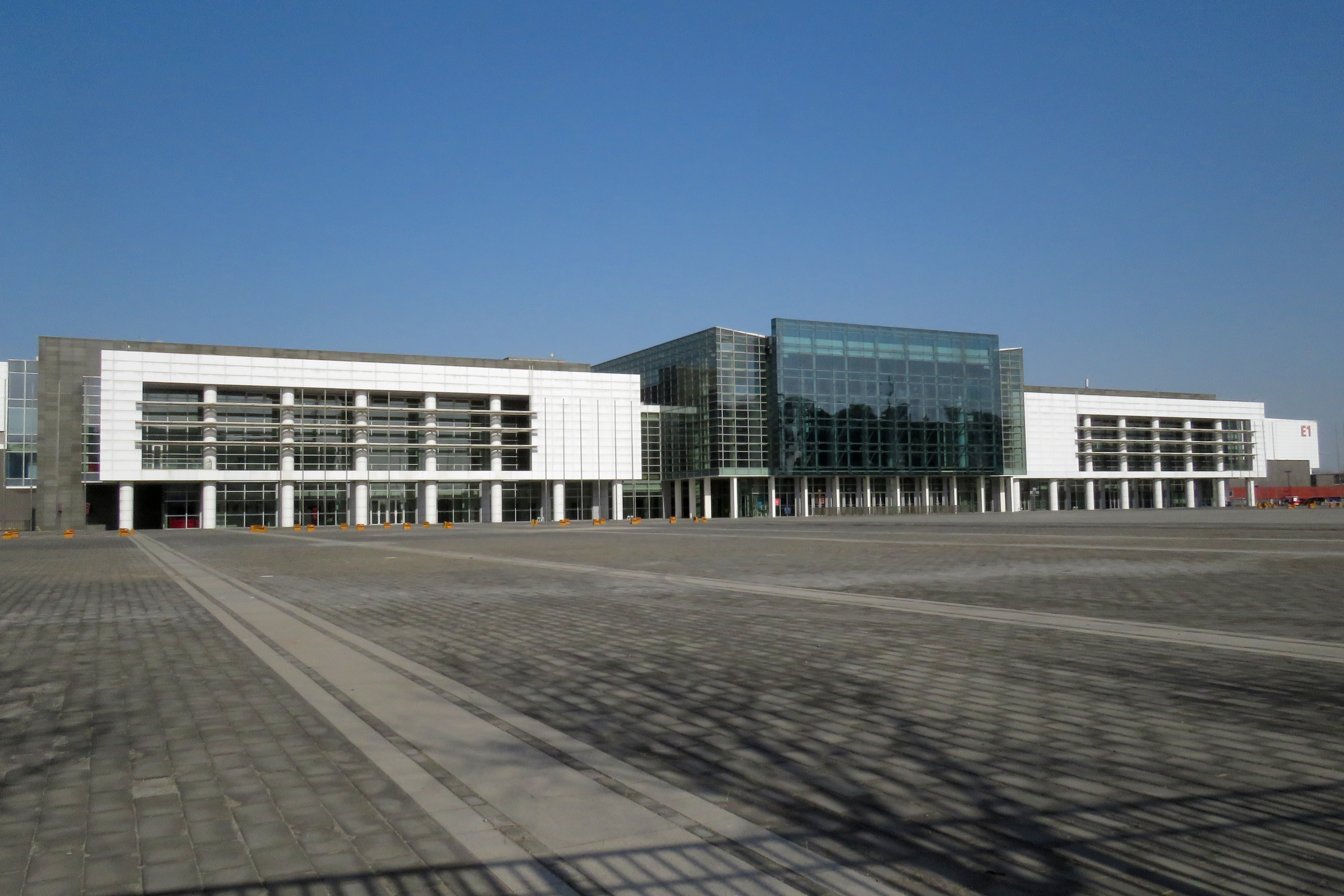
- New China International Exhibition Center in 2018
- Interactive map of China International Exhibition Center
- Address: 88 Yuxiang Rd, Shunyi District (Shunyi Center); Jing'an West St, Chaoyang District (Chaoyang Center)
- Location: Beijing, China

Construction
- Opened: 1985 (Chaoyang Center); 2008 (Shunyi Center)

Website
- www.ciec-expo.com.cn

The China International Convention Centers (Chinese: 中国国际展览中心) consists of eight convention halls in Beijing, China. The Chaoyang Center is located in downtown Chaoyang District while the new Shunyi Center is located in Shunyi District.

== Public transport ==
Xibahe station (Exit D) of Line 12 and Line 17 is located near the Chaoyang Center.

China Int'l Exhibition Center station of Line 15 serves Shunyi Center, connecting it to downtown Beijing.

Several bus routes are available near both site.
