= CHOIR (art installation) =

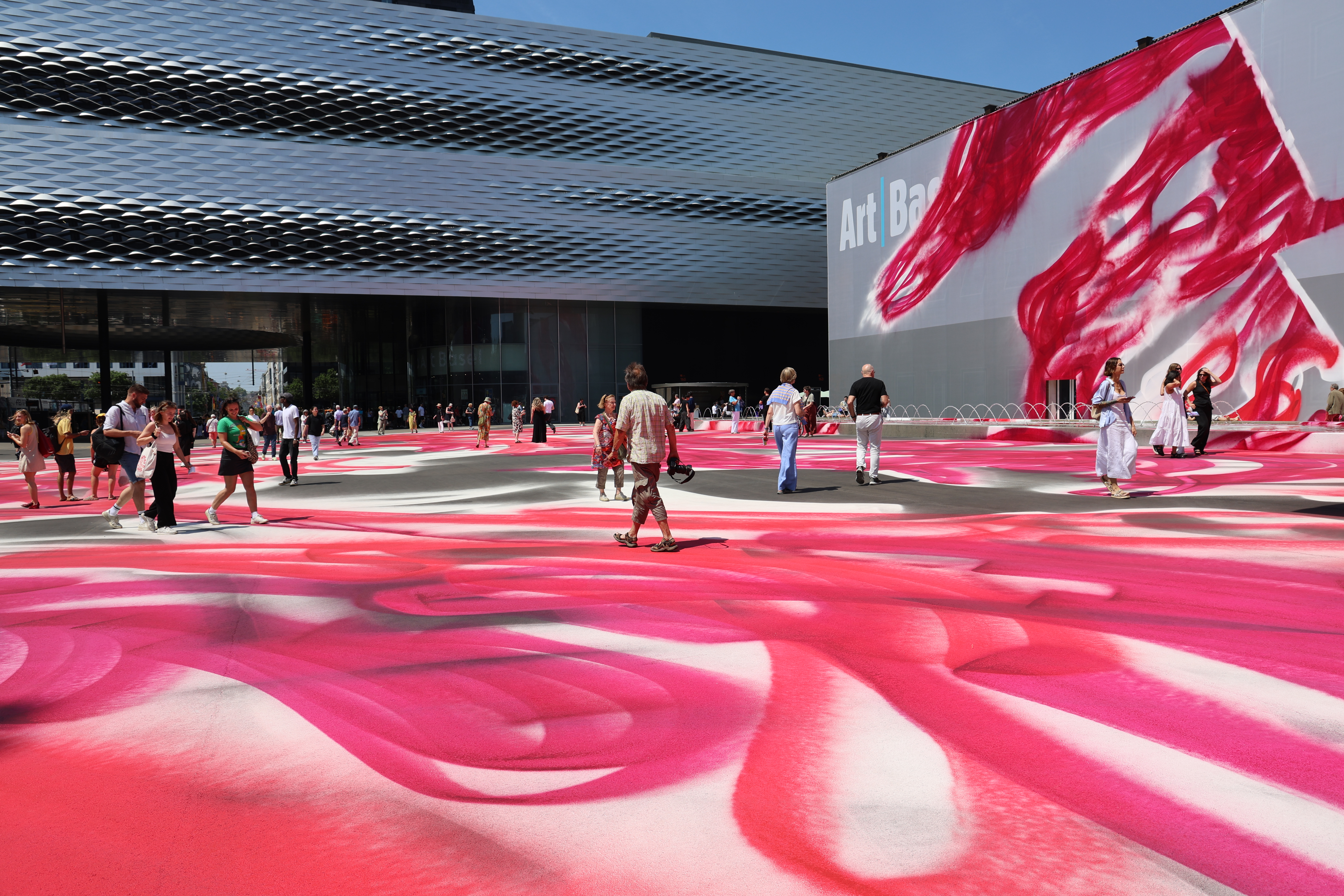
CHOIR installation by German Artist Katharina Grosse at Messeplatz at Art Basel 2025

CHOIR is an art installation created by German artist Katharina Grosse for the 2025 Art Basel flagship fair. Up for only seven days, the work covered the walls and structures of the Messeplatz in Basel with white and magenta paint.

The 53,000 square feet of the pedestrian area of the Messeplatz was the largest canvas for Grosse to date. It took Grosse and her team six days to create the work.

When questioned about the short duration of the artwork's existence, Grosse said she found the ephemeral quality to be one of its strengths. In an interview with ARTNews she said, "You can't buy it, you can't own it. It defies the reality of the fair, which is mainly about transactions. There is beauty in that transience."

The work was curated by Natalia Grabowska, of the Serpentine Gallery in London.
