= Metro Toronto Convention Centre =

Convention center in Toronto, Canada

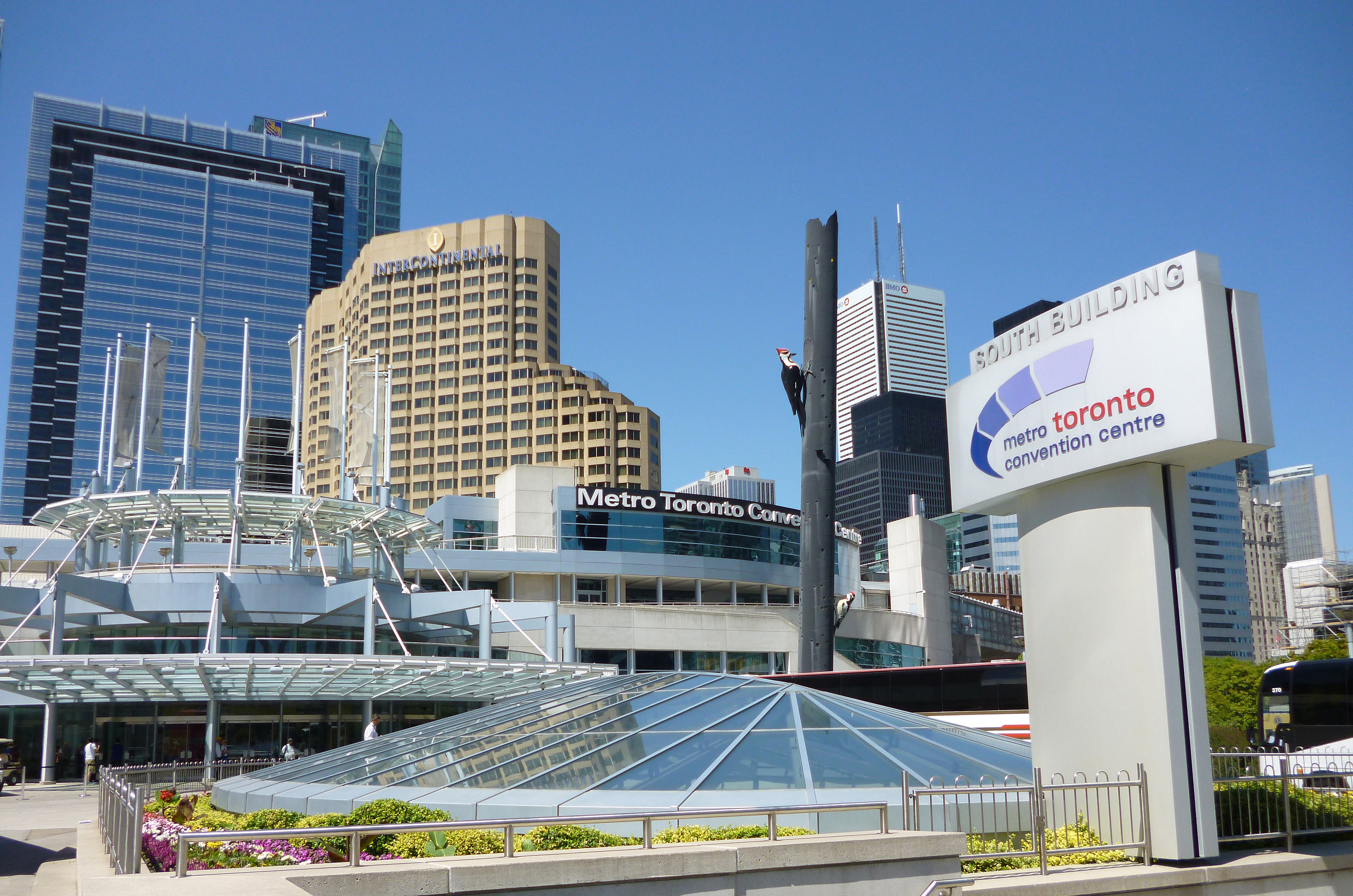
- Metro Toronto Convention Centre, South Building
- Interactive map of Metro Toronto Convention Centre
- Address: 255 Front Street West; Toronto, Ontario; M5V 2W6
- Coordinates: 43°38′39″N 79°23′12″W
- Owner: Province of Ontario
- Public transit: Union Station

Construction
- Built: 1980s
- Opened: October 1984
- Renovated: 2018
- Expanded: 1997

Website
- www.mtccc.com

Metro Toronto Convention Centre (originally and still colloquially Metro Convention Centre, and sometimes MTCC; French: Palais des congrès du Toronto métropolitain), is a convention complex located in Toronto, Ontario, Canada along Front Street West in the former Railway Lands in downtown Toronto. The property is today owned by Oxford Properties. The centre is operated by the Metropolitan Toronto Convention Centre Corporation, an independent agency of the Government of Ontario.

== Description ==
The MTCC has 700,000 square feet (65,000 m^{2}) of space, and is home to the 1232-seat John Bassett Theatre. To the east end of the complex is the 586-room InterContinental Toronto Centre hotel (formerly Canadian National Railway's L'Hotel CN). At the west end of the complex is a 265,000 square foot Class-B office building. Within the office building is the Pint restaurant, which was formerly a Baton Rouge from 2006 to 2017 and a Planet Hollywood from 1996 to 2006. A south building containing exhibition space is located on Bremner Boulevard, south of the rail lines.

The centre is connected to the Union Station railway and transit station through the SkyWalk, and the centre is also accessible via the underground Path system. The centre is also connected by the Skywalk system to the nearby Rogers Centre and large conventions or exhibitions will sometimes also use it as an additional venue. The Skywalk also connects the convention centre to the CN Tower and Ripley's Aquarium of Canada.

According to a 2018 report, over the past 34 years, the MTCC has hosted over 20,000 events and has added CA$6.3 billion in direct spending economic impact to the community. Direct spending economic impact is created when conference, trade and public show attendees spend on dining, hotel nights, shopping, transportation and more in Toronto. Based on the Ontario Tourism Regional Economic Impact Model (TREIM), the MTCC also sustained a record-breaking 7,622 jobs in the community in its 2017/18 fiscal year.

== History ==
The site was formerly federally owned Railway Lands. Prior to the early 1980s, the site was home to tail end tracks and a parking lot. During the 1970s, the site was part of the proposed and failed "Metro Centre" development which sought to convert the large rail lands in one large development. Development instead proceeded in parcel-by-parcel fashion, with developments such as Roy Thomson Hall, the CN Tower, the SkyDome stadium (renamed Rogers Centre in 2005) and Ripley's Aquarium of Canada. The rail yards were transferred to new locations north and east of Toronto. The main rail lines south of the centre were retained.

The convention centre and hotel was completed in 1984, built by CN Real Estate designed by Architects Crang and Boake. In 1995, ownership was transferred to Canada Lands Corporation, an agency of the Government of Canada. A new largely underground addition, designed by Bregman + Hamann Architects, was added south of the railways, east of the CN Tower in 1997 to expand convention space. In April 2011, the Canada Lands Corporation announced that the centre and hotel was for sale. OMERS-owned Oxford Properties won the rights to the complex in August 2011. The purchase of the North Building, the hotel, the 277 Front Street West office building and a 1,200 stall parking facility was completed in September 2011 for CA$238 million. The complex was adjacent to other Oxford-owned properties at 315 and 325 Front Street.

In October 2012, Oxford Properties proposed the redevelopment of the site with an updated convention centre, casino, hotel and retail complex, with the current MTCC complex would be demolished and replaced with a new complex. However, these proposals did not proceed.

In January 2021, a site at the convention centre opened as a large-scale clinic for distribution of the COVID-19 vaccine during the COVID-19 pandemic in Toronto.

In early 2026, Ontario Premier Doug Ford announced plans to build a new 2-million square foot convention centre in Toronto, replacing the MTCC.

== Events ==
The centre has hosted many large-scale events over the years. The centre has been the site of numerous political conventions, including the 14th G7 summit in 1988, the 2003 Progressive Conservative leadership election, the 2010 G20 Toronto summit, the 2004 Conservative Party leadership election, and the 2012 New Democratic Party leadership election. It also hosted the XVI International AIDS Conference in 2006.

The 1985 NHL entry draft was held at the centre. It was the annual home of the NHL Awards. It hosts the Fan Expo since 1997, and the Canadian International Auto Show since 1986. The Gemini Awards took place at the centre from 1986 to 2002 (except in 2000). The Enthusiast Gaming Live Expo (EGLX) was held at the venue from 2015 to 2019. As well, it has played host to Toronto auditions for talent competitions such as So You Think You Can Dance Canada and Canadian Idol.

The Art Toronto contemporary art exhibition is held at the venue since 2000. In 2011, the artist Achim Zeman presented an installation at the entrance-hall of the building called Str@del: Eight columns, walls, the ceiling and the reception were covered in red and matte white fluorescent foils. The stripes, wide and narrow surrounded the architectural space, and because of their arrangement left the impression on the viewer as if he was experiencing countless whirlpools, which swirled around him.

The 2016 Microsoft Worldwide Partner Conference was held at the centre.

== Gallery ==
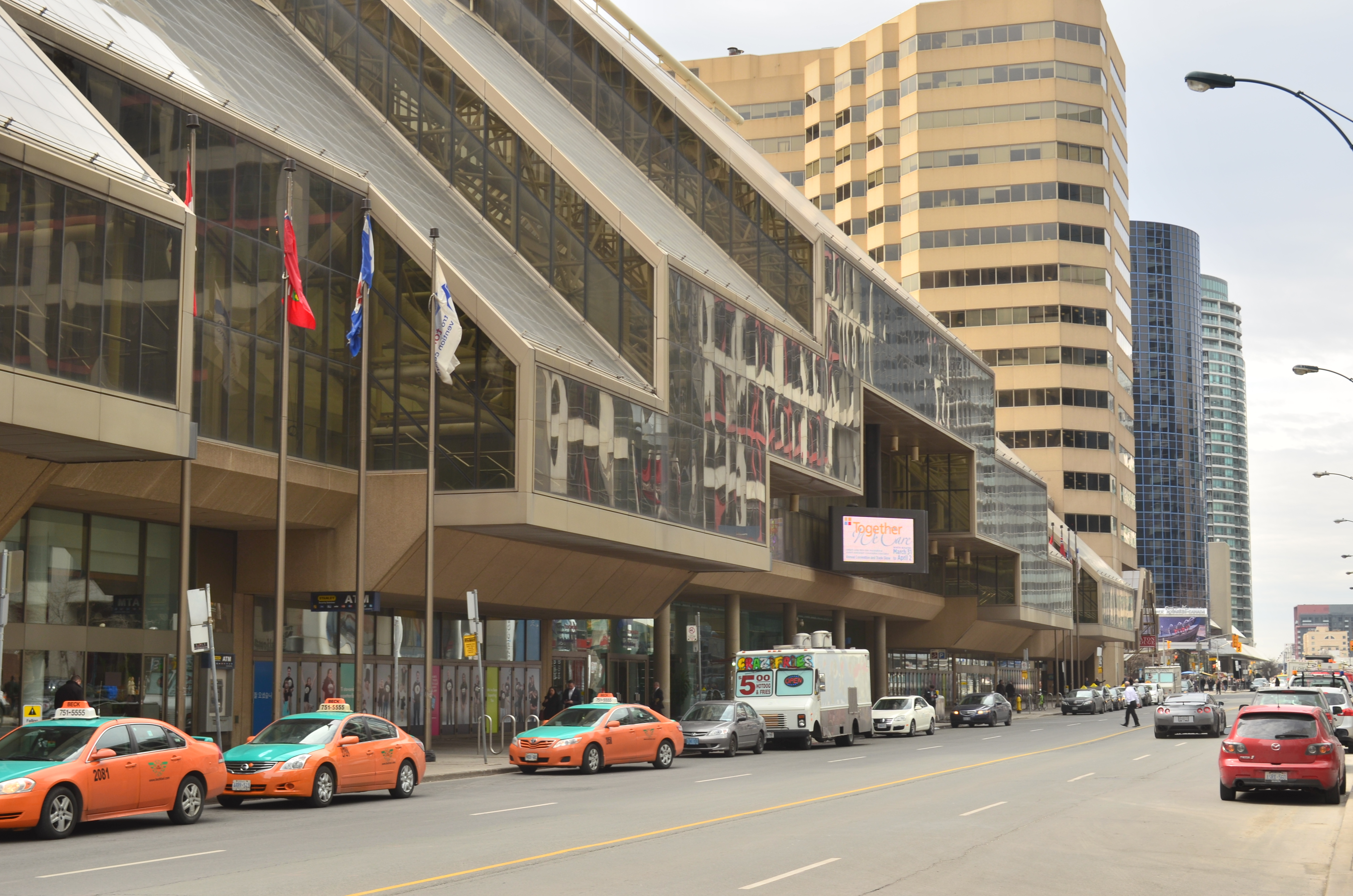
North Building of the Metro Toronto Convention Centre

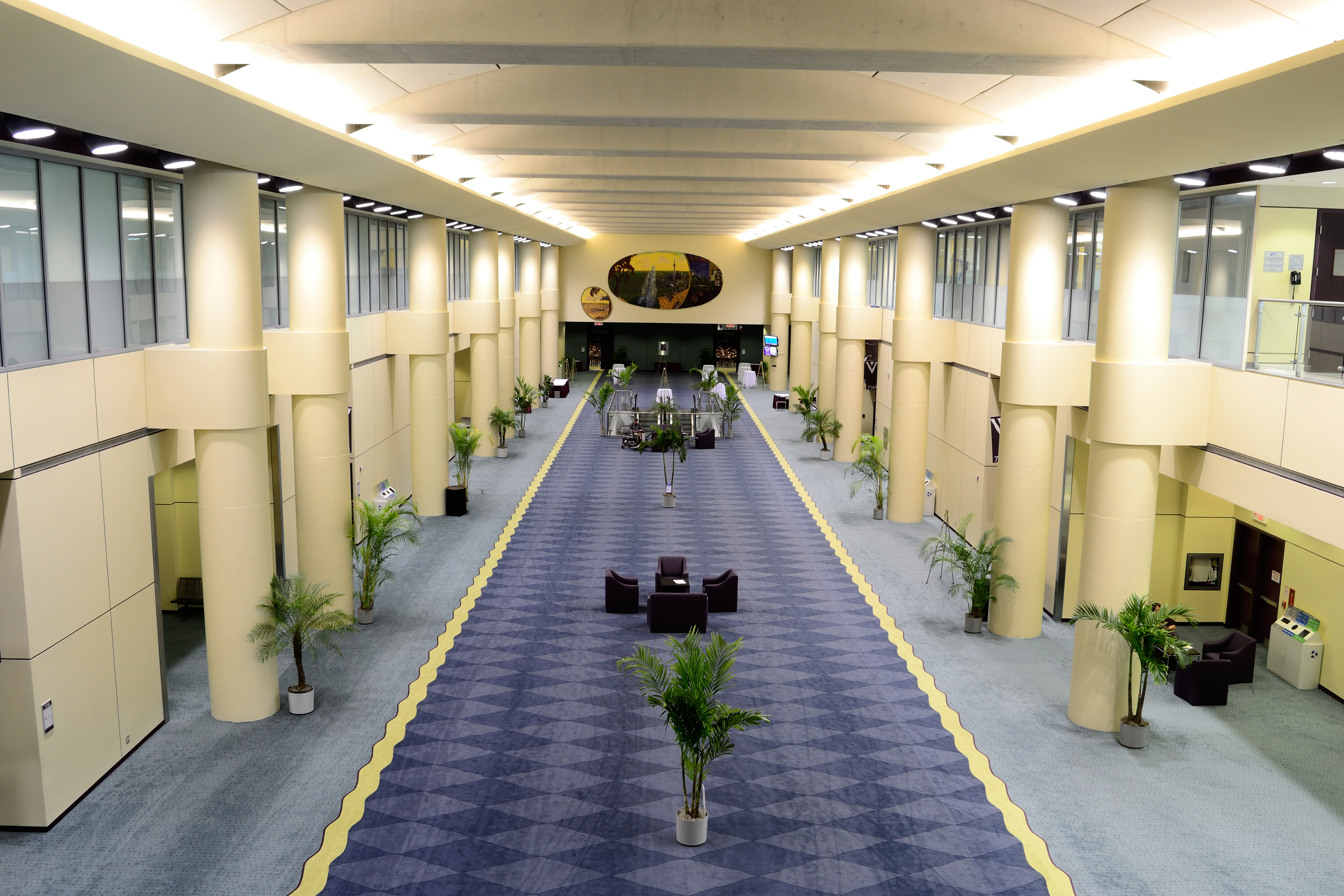
South Building Lobby of the Metro Toronto Convention Centre

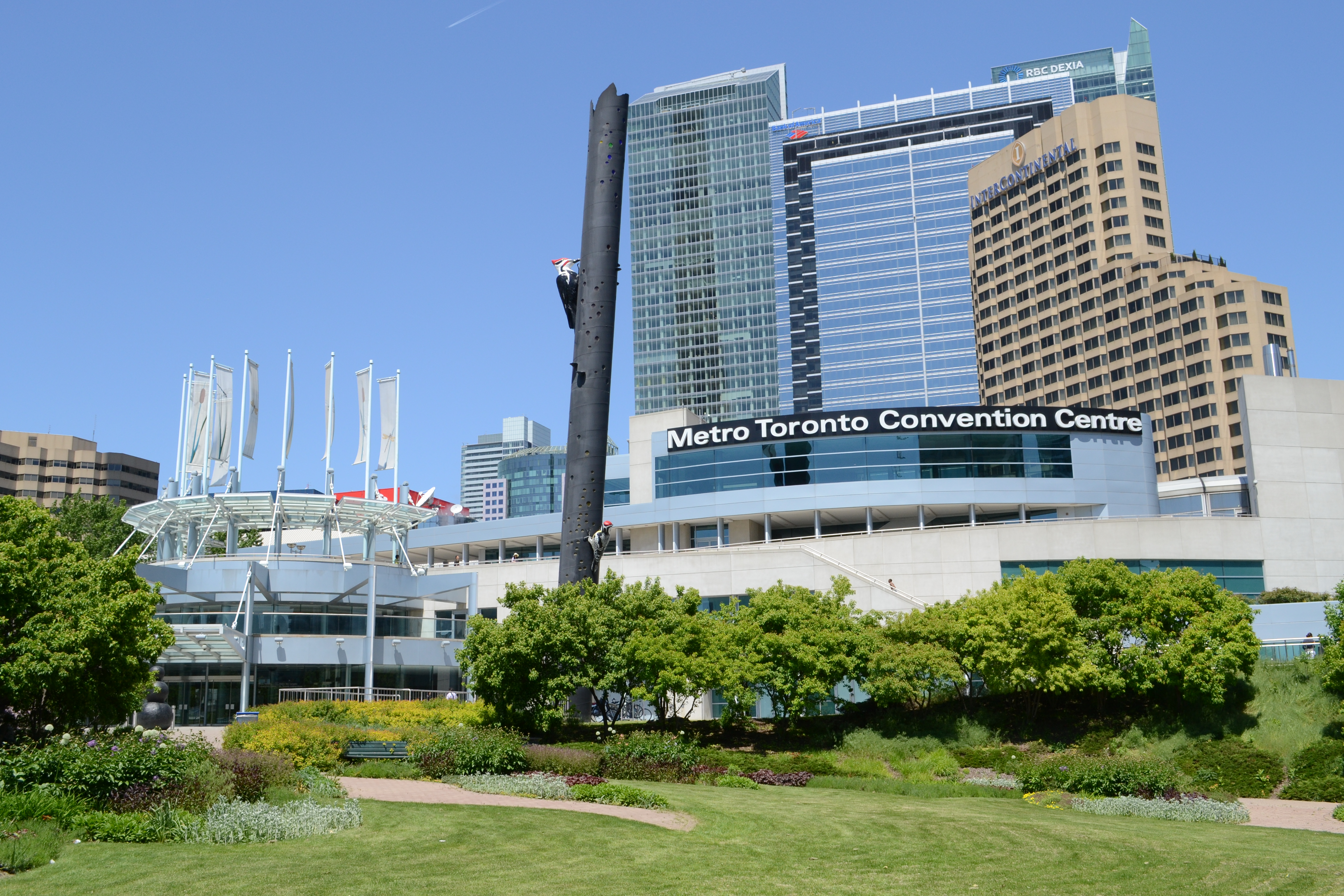
Grassland outside of the South Building

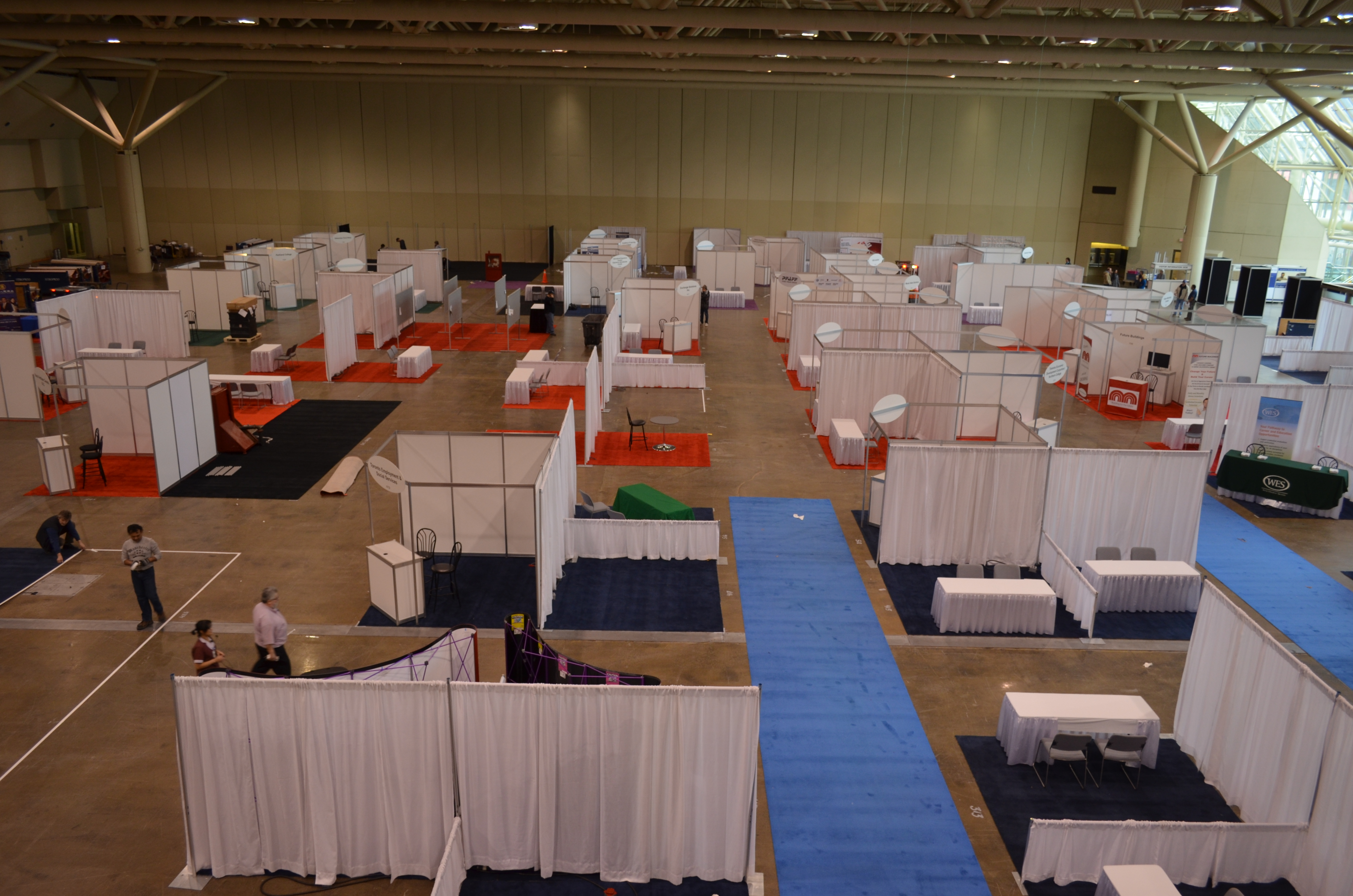
Conference booths during setup

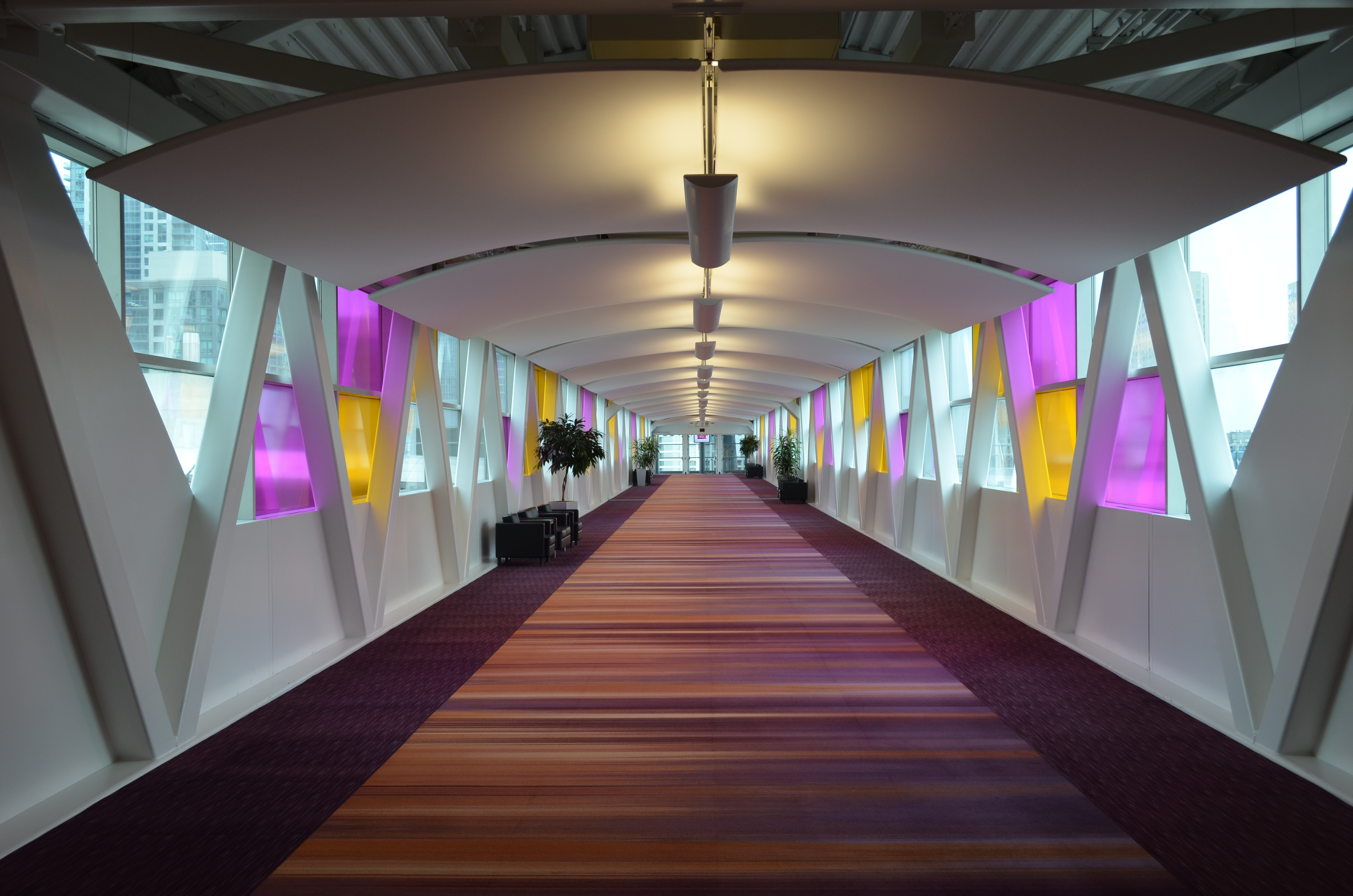
Bridge that links the North Building and the South Building

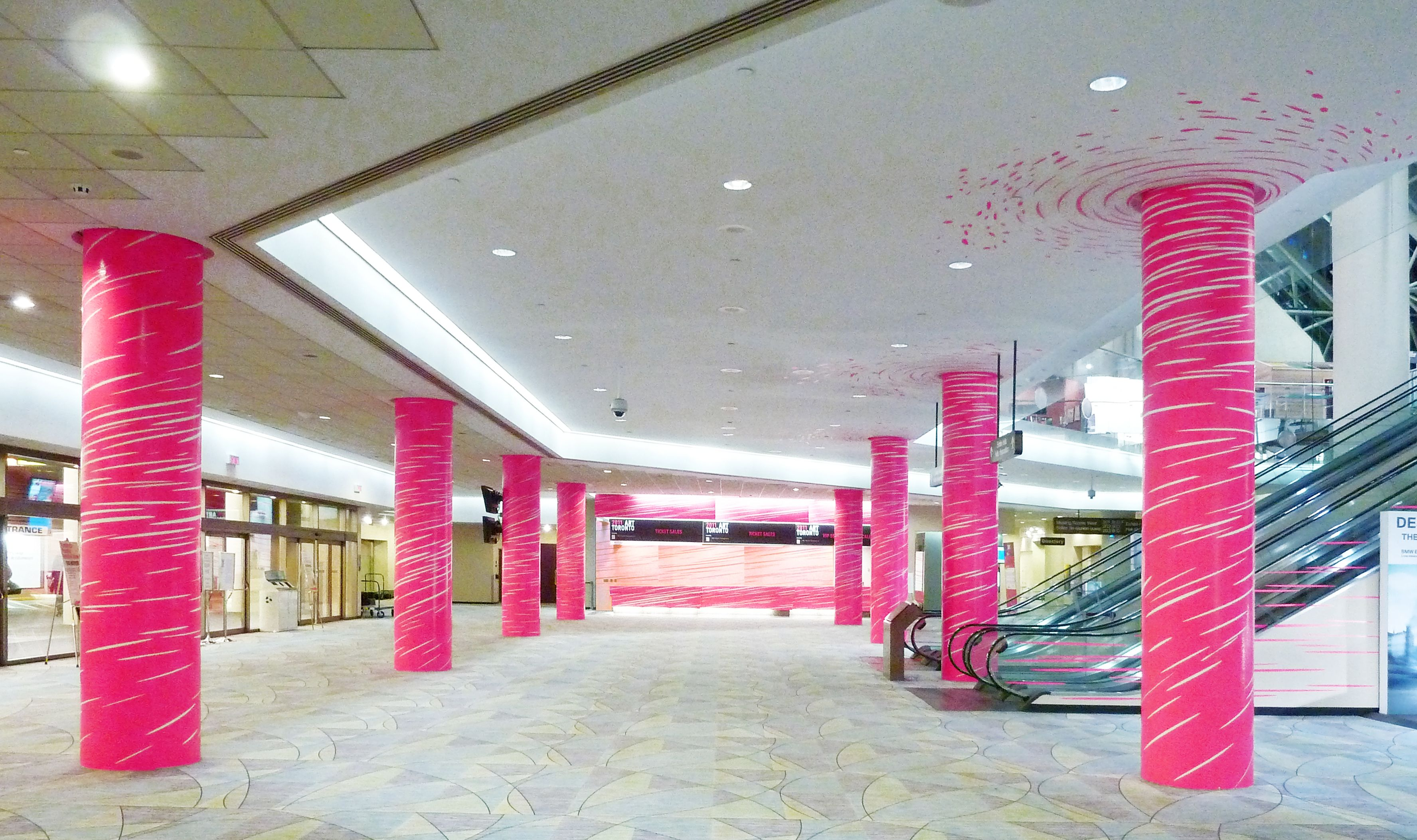
Art-Installation of Achim Zeman, Metro Toronto Convention Centre, on the occasion of the Art Toronto 2011

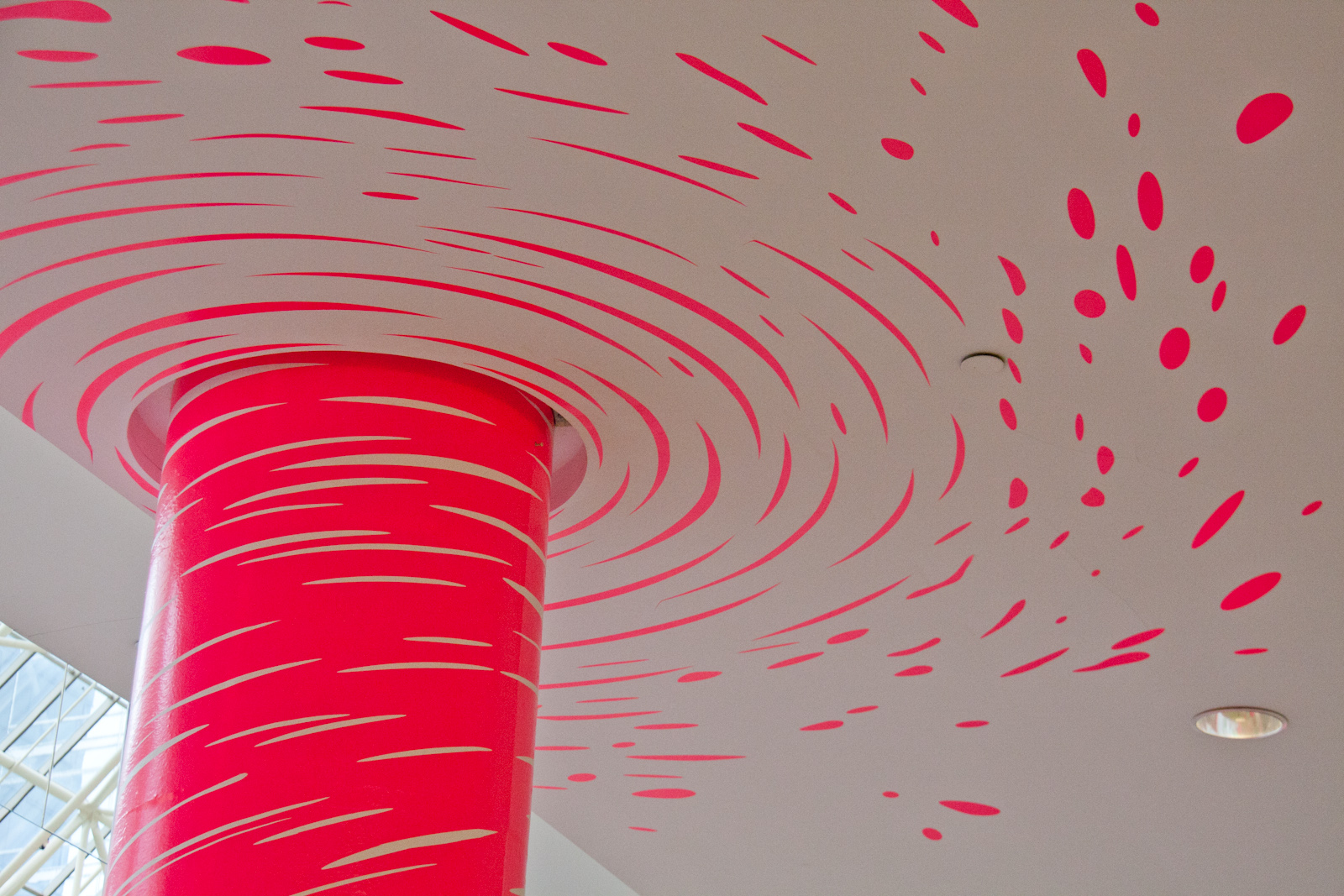
Art-Installation (Detail) of Achim Zeman, Metro Toronto Convention Centre, on the occasion of the Art Toronto 2011

== See also ==
Other convention venues in Canada, or the Greater Toronto Area:

- International Centre in Mississauga
- Enercare Centre at Exhibition Place
- Toronto Congress Centre in Etobicoke
