= Jason Deline =

Canadian actor and comedian

- Born: Jason Deline; Toronto, Ontario, Canada
- Occupations: Actor; comedian; director
- Years active: 1996–present
- Known for: Danger

Jason Deline is a Canadian actor, comedian and director. He is best known for his role as Ernie in Ready or Not, and for voicing the character of Drago in Bakugan Battle Brawlers and its reboot Bakugan Battle Planet.

== Career ==
Deline voiced Benkei in Beyblade's Metal Saga (Metal Fusion, Metal Masters, and Metal Fury) and Beyblade: Shogun Steel, and provided the voice of Glen in Beyblade's spin-off BeyWheelz. Jason also voiced the character Bow Hothoof in My Little Pony: Friendship Is Magic.

Deline appeared in X-Men: Days of Future Past, as well as the Robert Zemeckis film The Walk starring Joseph Gordon-Levitt and Ben Kingsley. He also recently starred in the BBC miniseries Jonathan Strange & Mr Norrell, as well as Star Trek: Discovery.

Deline is also the voice of many TV and radio commercials, including for such clients as Dodge Ram, Mucho Burrito, Subaru, Coke, Tim Hortons, Tums, Mitsubishi, Movie Central, Coleman, Sleep Country, and Rona.

Deline is a founding member of the sketch comedy troupe Radio Vault, and created the popular Find Your Voice voice-over workshops, as well as the Voice-over for Improvisers workshop at The Second City.

== Filmography ==
=== Film ===
| Year | Title | Role | Notes |
|---|---|---|---|
| 1997 | Men with Guns | Street Hustler | Uncredited |
| 2007 | Jack Brooks: Monster Slayer | Additional voices | |
| 2011 | Monster Brawl | Jake Blackburn | |
| 2014 | X-Men: Days of Future Past | Desk Anchor | |
| 2014 | Hellmouth | The Bargeman / Demonic Sheriff | |
| 2015 | The Walk | Officer Tessio | |
| 2016 | Spark: A Space Tail | Guards | |
| 2016 | X-Men: Apocalypse | Pentagon Tech | Uncredited |
| 2018 | The Lower Plateau | David | |
| 2019 | Arctic Dogs | Naz Narwhal | |

=== Television ===
| Year | Title | Role | Notes |
|---|---|---|---|
| 1996 | Moonshine Highway | Grocery Boy | Television film |
| 1997 | Ready or Not | Ernie Lipnit | 2 episodes |
| 2005 | Degrassi: The Next Generation | Camera Man | 3 episodes |
| 2005 | The West Wing | Santos' Aide #1 | Episode: "Freedonia" |
| 2005 | 1-800-Missing | Agent Wilson | 2 episodes |
| 2005 | Code Breakers | Additional voices | Television film |
| 2006 | Yours, Al | Young Al | Television film |
| 2007 | Love You to Death | Young Man #1 | Episode: "Storage Unit Murder" |
| 2007 | Magi-Nation | Hyren Orothe | Episode: "The Depths of Courage" |
| 2007–2009 | Bakugan Battle Brawlers | Drago / Ryo | 52 episodes |
| 2009 | The Amazing Spiez! | Bark Ferndale | Episode: "Operation Shrubbery" |
| 2009–2013 | Beyblade: Metal Fusion | Benkei | 54 episodes |
| 2010 | Keep Your Head Up, Kid: The Don Cherry Story | Additional voices | 2 episodes |
| 2010–2011 | Bakugan Battle Brawlers: Gundalian Invaders | Drago | 43 episodes |
| 2010–2012 | Arthur | Various roles | 21 episodes |
| 2011 | Justin Time | King | Episode: "You Forgot to Say Arrgh! & the Sultan's Wish" |
| 2011 | Warehouse 13 | Security Officer Kemp | Episode: "Past Imperfect" |
| 2012 | Beauty & the Beast | Various roles | 3 episodes |
| 2012 | BeyWheelz | Glen | 11 episodes |
| 2013 | Beyblade: Shogun Steel | Benkei | 6 episodes |
| 2013, 2014 | The Ron James Show | Various roles | 2 episodes |
| 2014 | Totally Spies! | Professor Jenkins | Episode: "Pageant Problems" |
| 2015 | Trigger Point | The Interrogator | Television film |
| 2015 | Jonathan Strange & Mr Norrell | Ned | 2 episodes |
| 2015, 2017 | Arrow | Adam Hoffman | 2 episodes |
| 2016 | Aftermath | Deputy Jacobs | Episode: "RVL 6768" |
| 2017 | When We Rise | Paul Volberding | Episode: "Night II: Parts II and III" |
| 2017 | My Little Pony: Friendship Is Magic | Various roles | Episode: "Parental Glideance" |
| 2017 | Star Trek: Discovery | Medical Officer | Episode: "Magic to Make the Sanest Man Go Mad" |
| 2018 | Sleeper | Agent Doug Emory | Television film |
| 2018 | The Truth About the Harry Quebert Affair | Officer Hershey | Miniseries |
| 2018 | Murdoch Mysteries | Dr. Archibald Stanfield | Episode: "Secrets and Lies" |
| 2018 | Chop Chop Ninja | Neeko / Tetsuo | 40 episodes |
| 2018–2023 | Bakugan: Battle Planet | Drago | 31 episodes |
| 2019 | American Gods | Newscaster #4 | Episode: "Moon Shadow" |
| 2019 | Air Crash Investigation | Officer Thomas Curran | Episode: "Borderline Tactics" |
| 2019 | Bakugan: Small Brawl Stories | Dragonoid | 19 episodes |
| 2020 | Star Trek: Short Treks | Dad | Episode: "Children of Mars" |
| 2020 | No Good Deed | Lance | Television film |
| 2023–2024 | Bakugan 3.1 | Razor | Voice, 8 episodes |
