= Datun =

Datun may refer to:

- Datun (twig), or Datwoon, the Indian name for teeth-cleaning twigs
- Tatun Volcanoes, mountains in Taiwan
- Datun Sahib, a tree in Ladakh, India
- Datun Subdistrict, in Chaoyang District, Beijing, China
- Datunludong station, rapid transit station in Chaoyang District, Beijing, China

== See also ==
- Datsun, a car brand by Nissan
