= Sunhe =

Sunhe may refer to:

- Sunhe Station, Beijing Subway, China
- Sunhe, Beijing, in Shunyi District, Beijing, China
