= Guanzhuang station =

Guanzhuang station may refer to:

- Guanzhuang station (Line 15) (关庄, Guānzhuāng), a station on Line 15 of the Beijing Subway
- Guaanzhuang station (管庄, Guǎnzhuāng), a station on the Batong line (through service to Line 1) of the Beijing Subway

== See also ==
- Guanzhuangluxikou station, future station on Line 3 of Beijing Subway
