= Olympic Green =

Olympic Park in Chaoyang, Beijing, China

Coordinates: 40°00′10.91″N 116°23′12.01″E

- 奥林匹克公园
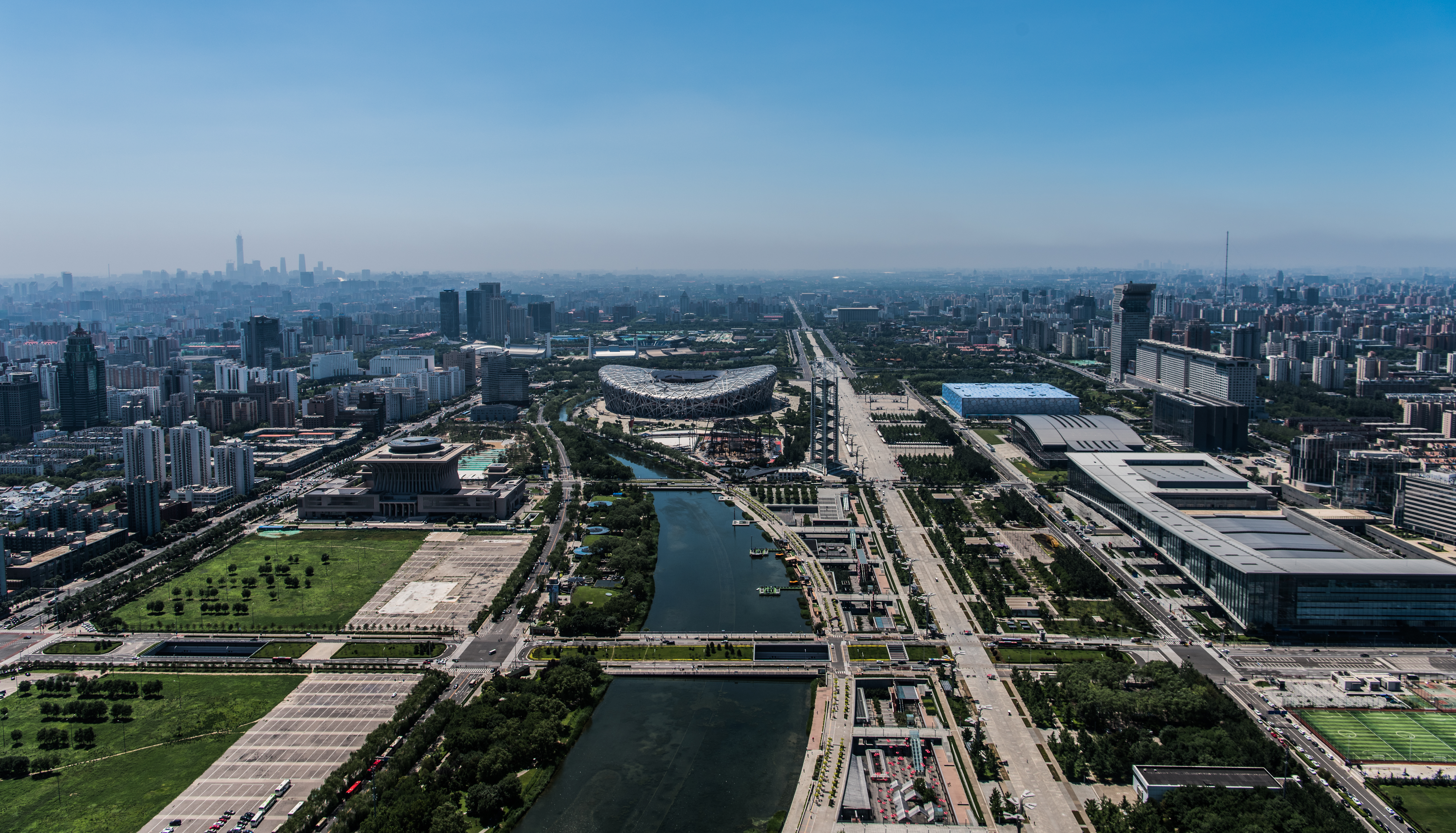
- The Olympic Green
- Interactive map of Olympic Green
- Type: Olympic Park
- Location: Beijing, China
- Opened: March 2004; 22 years ago

The Olympic Green (Chinese: 奥林匹克公园; pinyin: Àolínpǐkè Gōngyuán; lit. 'Olympic Park') is an Olympic Park in Chaoyang, Beijing, China. The three main facilities there include the National Stadium (Bird's Nest), Water Cube, and National Indoor Stadium.

Olympic Green was originally constructed for the 2008 Summer Olympics and the 2008 Summer Paralympics. Since then, the streets around the park have been used for an exhibition street race of the FIA GT1 World Championship in 2011, after a race at Goldenport Park Circuit in the vicinity. It again served as an Olympic Park when Beijing hosted the 2022 Winter Olympics and the 2022 Winter Paralympics.

== Current venues ==
=== Beijing National Stadium ===
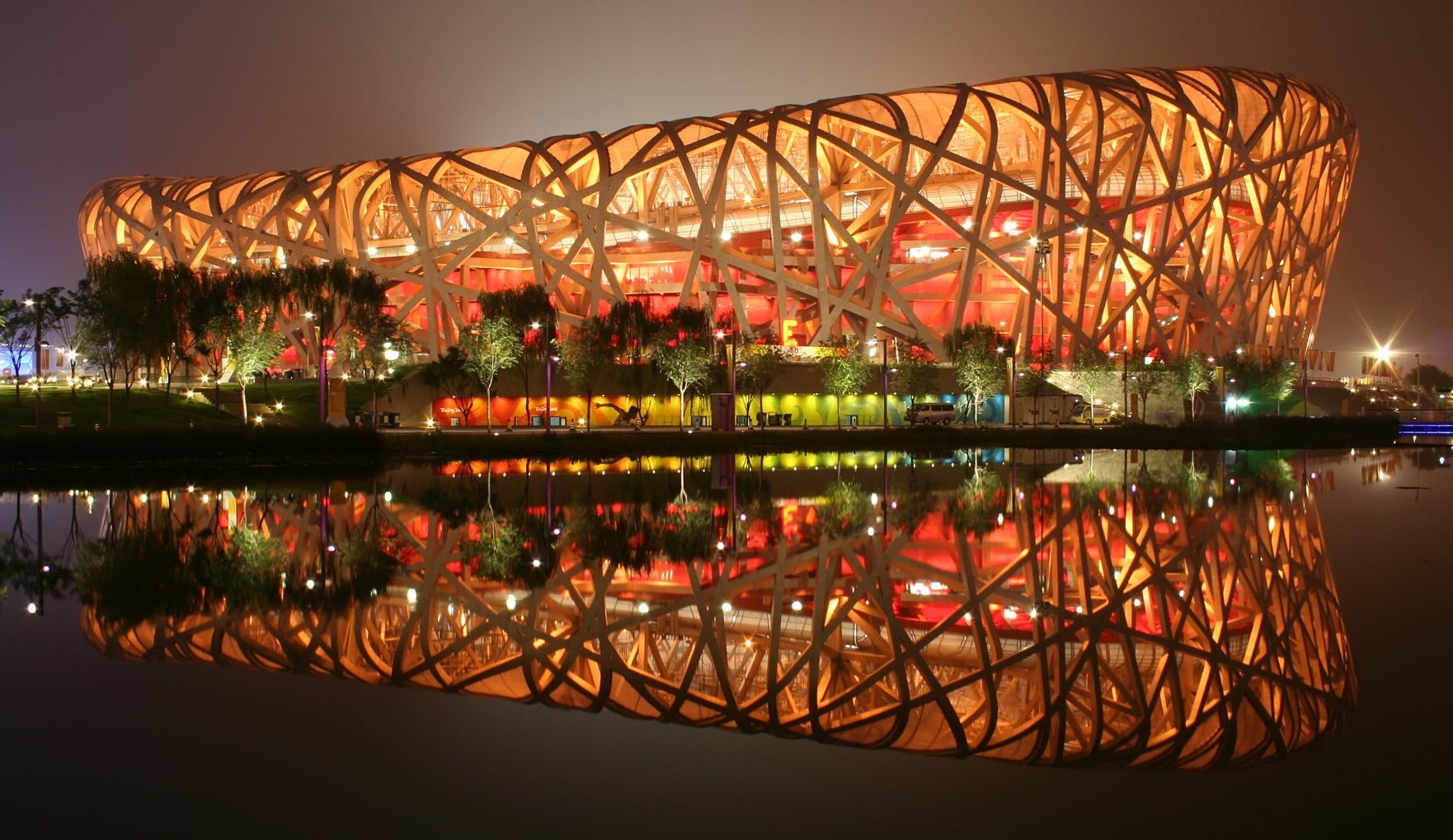
Beijing National Stadium

The Beijing National Stadium (国家体育场) or "Bird's Nest" (鸟巢) is the centerpiece of this project. It hosted the opening and closing ceremonies, athletics, and football finals of the Games. The stadium has room for 91,000 spectators, but the capacity was reduced to 80,000 after the Olympics. It also served as the site of the opening and closing ceremonies of the 2022 Winter Olympics.

=== Beijing National Aquatics Center ===
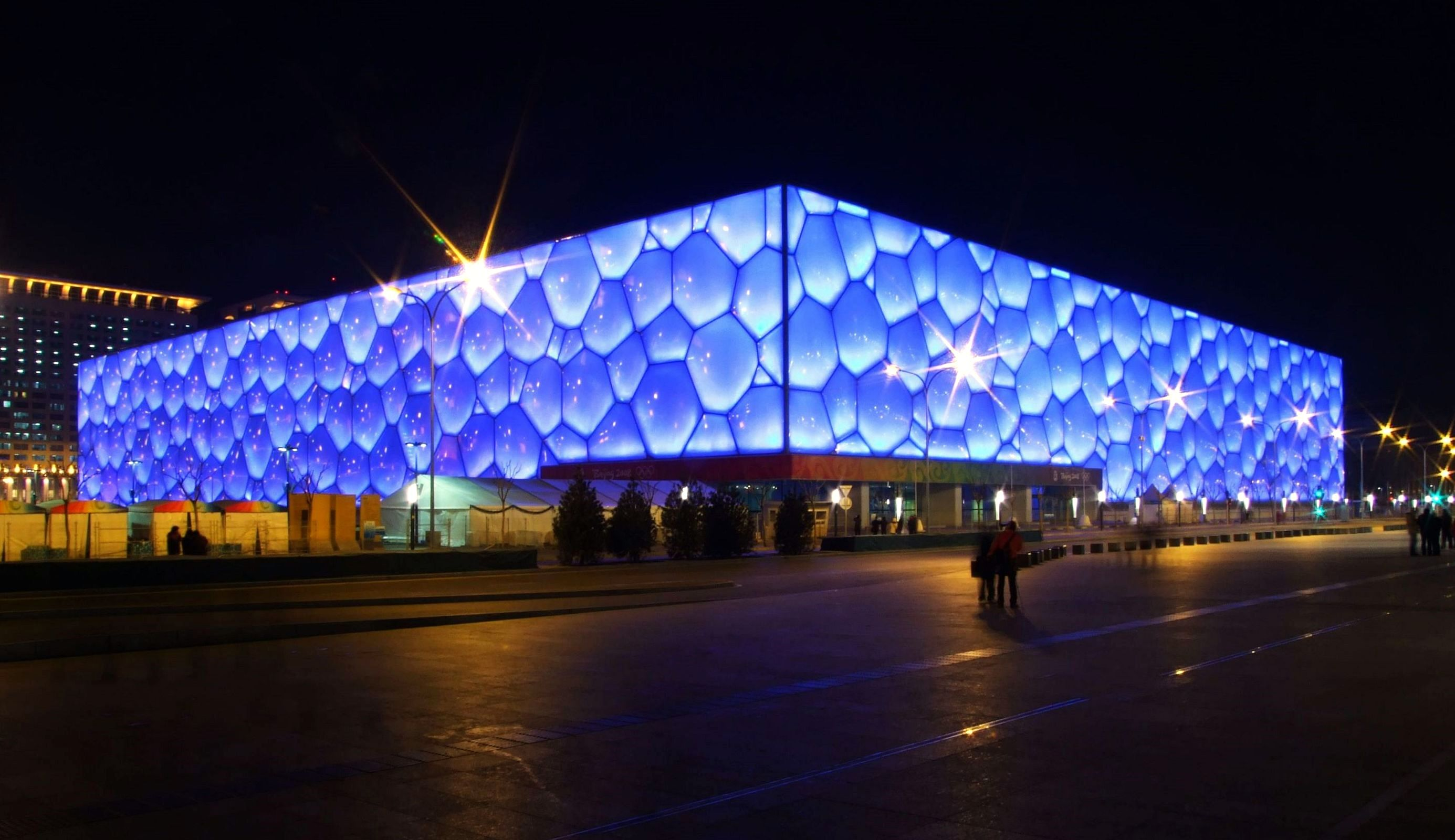
Beijing National Aquatics Center

The Beijing National Aquatics Center (国家游泳中心) or "Water Cube" (水立方) hosted the swimming, diving and synchronized swimming events. It has a capacity of 6,000 (17,000 during the 2008 Olympics)and is located next to the National Stadium.Was the curling venue during the 2022 Winter Olympics.

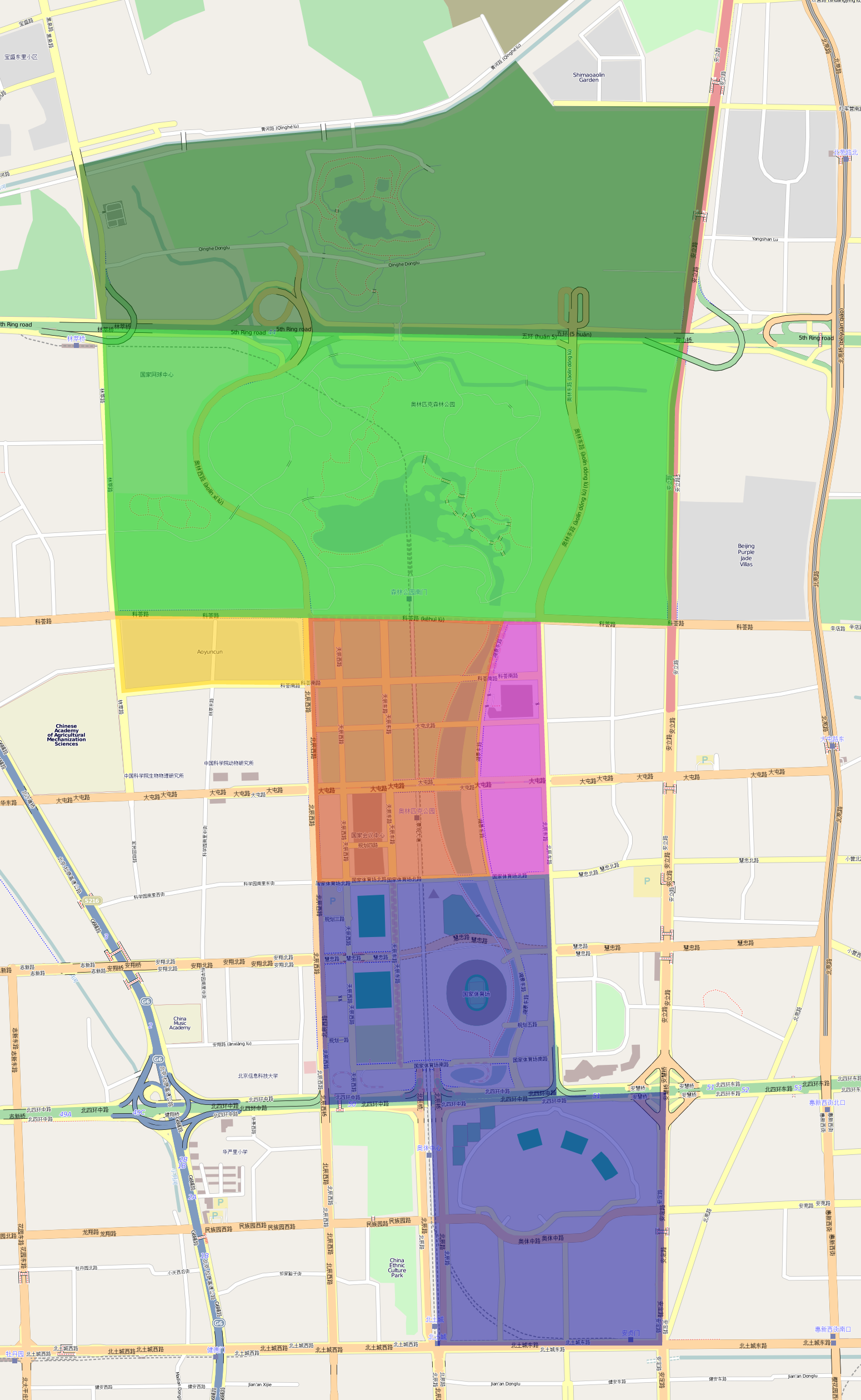
Olympic Green map

=== Beijing National Indoor Stadium ===
The Beijing National Indoor Stadium (国家体育馆) or "the Fan" held the handball, artistic gymnastics and trampolining events. With a capacity of 19,000, it was the main indoor arena used during the 2008 Summer Olympics and the 2022 Winter Olympics, as the venue was the main ice hockey venue.

=== Beijing National Speed Skating Oval ===
The Beijing National Speed Skating Oval is an arena that was built for the 2022 Winter Olympics.

=== Olympic Green Convention Center ===
The Olympic Green Convention Center, a.k.a. the National Convention Center (国家会议中心), held fencing and, the shooting and fencing disciplines of the modern pentathlon. It is also used as the International Broadcast Center and the Main Press Center (for conventions and exhibitions). The center covers an area of 270,000 square meters.

=== Olympic Green Tennis Center ===
The Olympic Green Tennis Center (北京奥林匹克公园网球场) hosted the tennis and wheelchair tennis events. It has 16 courts (10 competition, 6 practice) and a capacity of 17,400. It opened on October 1, 2007.

=== Promenade ===
The park itself, outside of the venues constructed on the Olympic Green, hosted some of the athletic events at the 2008 Games. These included the racewalk events, where the loops occurred on the Olympic Green, and the portion of the marathons just outside the National Stadium.

== Former venues ==
=== Olympic Green Hockey Field ===
The Olympic Green Hockey Field hosted the field hockey events. It covered an area of 11.87 hectares (29.3 acres) with 2 courts and could seat 17,000 spectators. It was deconstructed after the Games.

=== Olympic Green Archery Field ===
The Olympic Green Archery Field hosted the archery events. The field occupied 9.22 hectares (22.8 acres) and had a capacity of 5,000. It was dismantled after the Games.

== Other parts ==
=== Beijing 2008 Olympic Village ===
The 2008 Summer Olympic Village housed all the participating athletes. The village is made up of 22 6-story buildings and 20 9-story buildings.

=== Digital Beijing Building ===
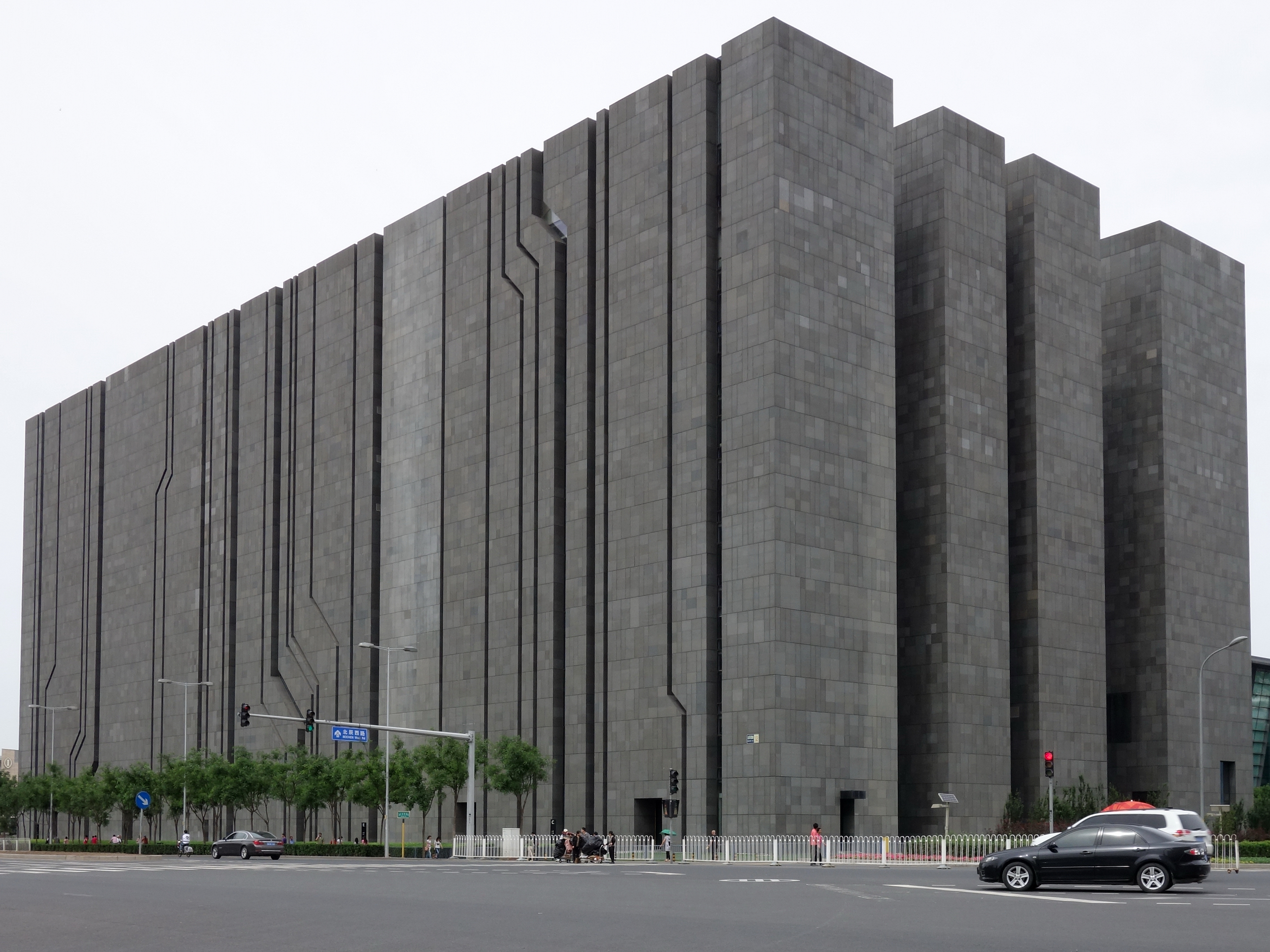
The Digital Beijing Building

The Digital Beijing Building served during the Games as the data center. It was the only building on the Green at the time of the Olympics that was not a sporting venue. Since then it has been converted into a museum and an exhibition space for digital technology companies.

Chinese architect Pei Zhu designed the distinctive 57-metre-high (187 ft), 11-story building near the Aquatic Centre and Convention Center. At the time of the Games, it was the only major facility designed by a Chinese architect. It is meant to explore the relationship between digital forms and traditional Chinese aesthetics, meant to evoke a microchip from two of its façades and a bar code from the other two.

=== Ling Long Pagoda ===
The Ling Long Pagoda or Linglong Tower (Multifunctional Studio Tower) (玲珑塔) houses a part of the International Broadcast Center (IBC). It is located near the 2008 Summer Olympics cauldron, on the northwest side of the Bird's Nest Stadium.

=== Beijing Olympic Tower ===
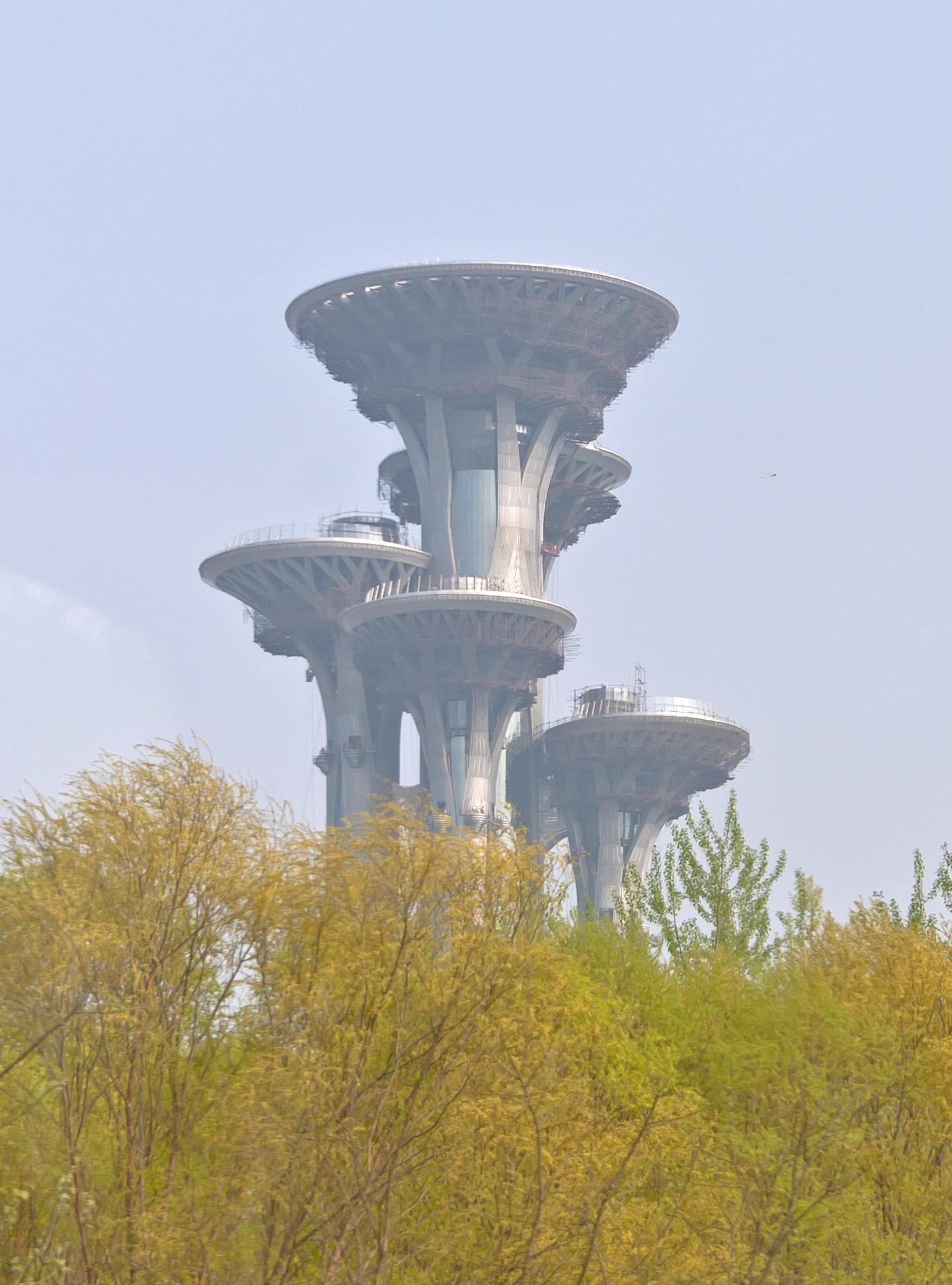
Beijing Olympic Tower in early 2014

Completed and opened in 2014, the 246.8-metre-tall (810 ft) Beijing Olympic Tower's five circular roofs are meant to evoke the Olympic rings; although it has also been described as "a huge nail". The design of the towers themselves were inspired by blades of grass. It is the sixth tallest observation tower in China and the 22nd highest in the world. Visitors can look out over the park and the entire city of Beijing from all five platforms, ranging from 186 to 243 metres (610 to 797 ft) in height.

== Transport ==
- Aolinpike Gongyuan (Olympic Park) station, Lines 8 and 15
- Aoti Zhongxin (Olympic Sports Center) station, Line 8

== See also ==
- Olympic Forest Park (奥林匹克森林公园), located North of Olympic Green, a forest park in Chaoyang District, Beijing
- Venues of the 2008 Summer Olympics
- Venues of the 2022 Winter Olympics
