= Anli Lu station =

Beijing Subway station

Coordinates: 40.0027°N 116.4078°E

Anli Lu 安立路
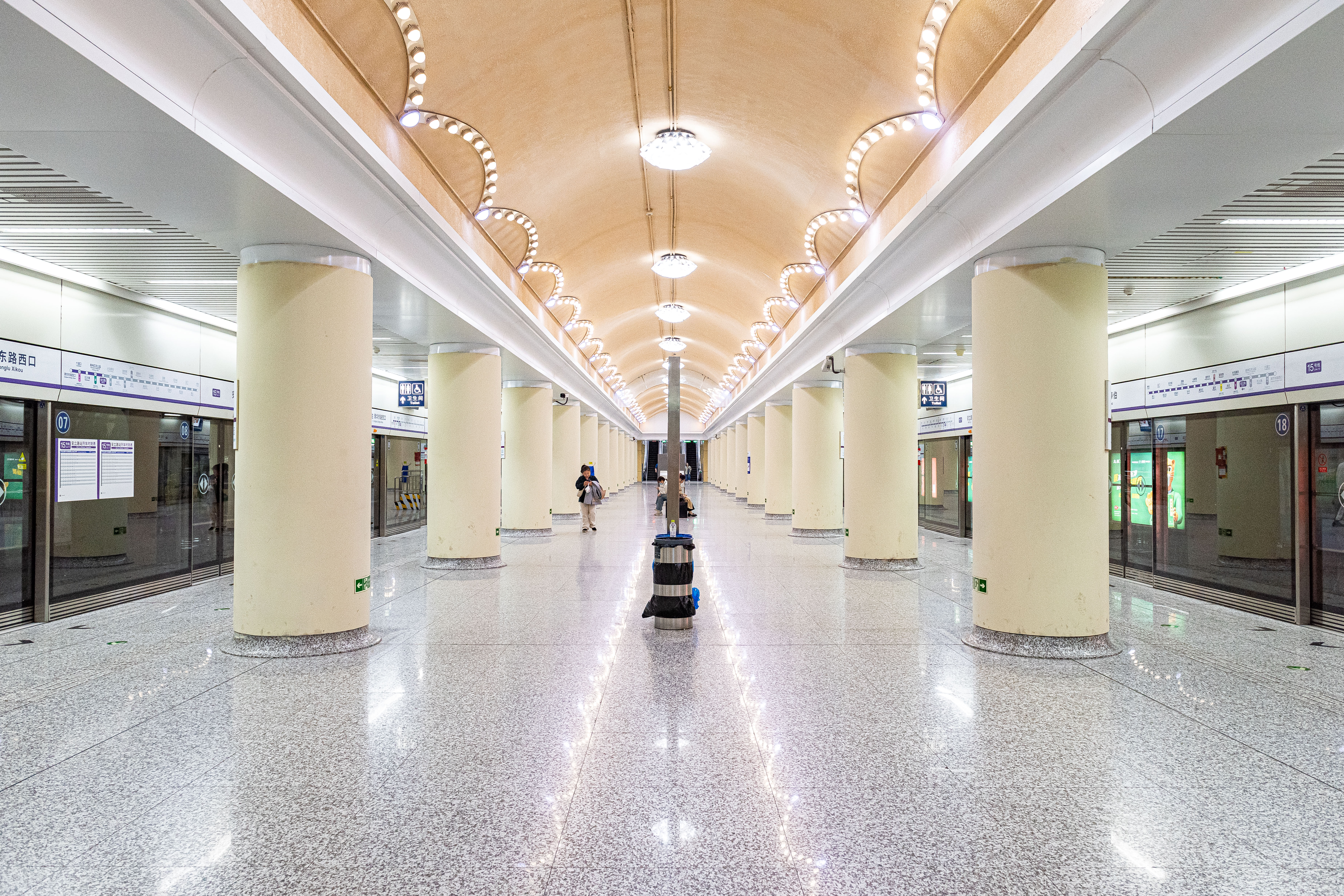
- Platform

General information
- Location: Datun Road and Anli Road; Datun Subdistrict, Chaoyang District, Beijing; China
- Operator: Beijing Mass Transit Railway Operation Corporation Limited
- Line: Line 15
- Platforms: 2 (1 island platform)
- Tracks: 2

Construction
- Structure type: Underground
- Accessible: Yes

History
- Opened: December 28, 2014; 11 years ago

Services
Preceding station	Beijing Subway	Following station
Olympic Park towards Qinghua Donglu Xikou	Line 15	Datunludong towards Fengbo
Location
- Location within Beijing

Anli Lu station (Chinese: 安立路站; pinyin: Ānlì Lù zhàn; lit. 'Anli Road station') is a station on Line 15 of the Beijing Subway. It was opened on December 28, 2014 as a part of the stretch between Wangjingxi and Qinghua Donglu Xikou and is located between Datunludong and Olympic Park stations.

== Station layout ==
The station has an underground island platform.

== Exits ==
There are 5 exits, lettered A1, A2, B, C, and D. Exits D is accessible.
