= Maquanying station =

Beijing Subway station

Maquanying 马泉营
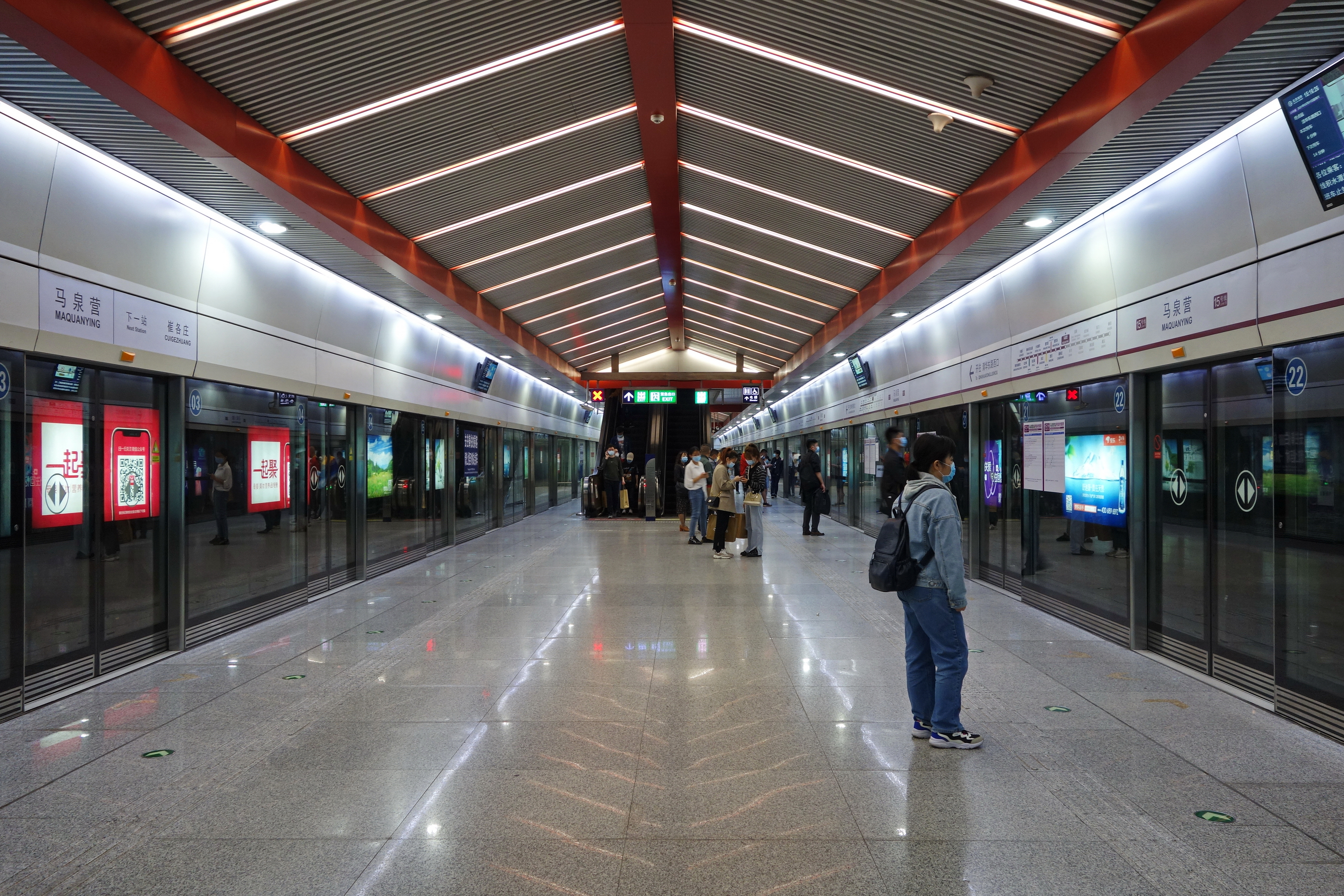
- Westbound platform

General information
- Location: North Xiangjiang Road (香江北路) and West Maquanying Road (马泉营西路); Chaoyang District, Beijing; China
- Coordinates: 40°02′01″N 116°30′13″E
- Operator: Beijing Mass Transit Railway Operation Corporation Limited
- Line: Line 15
- Platforms: 4 (2 island platforms)
- Tracks: 4

Construction
- Structure type: Underground
- Accessible: Yes

History
- Opened: December 30, 2010; 15 years ago

Services
Preceding station	Beijing Subway	Following station
Cuigezhuang towards Qinghua Donglu Xikou	Line 15	Sunhe towards Fengbo
Location
- Location within Beijing

Maquanying Station (simplified Chinese: 马泉营站; traditional Chinese: 馬泉營站; pinyin: Mǎquányíng Zhàn) is a station on Line 15 of the Beijing Subway. The station, along with Datunludong station, serves as a terminus for certain weekday rush hour and late hour services to and from Fengbo and Datunludong.

== Station layout ==
The station has underground dual-island platforms.

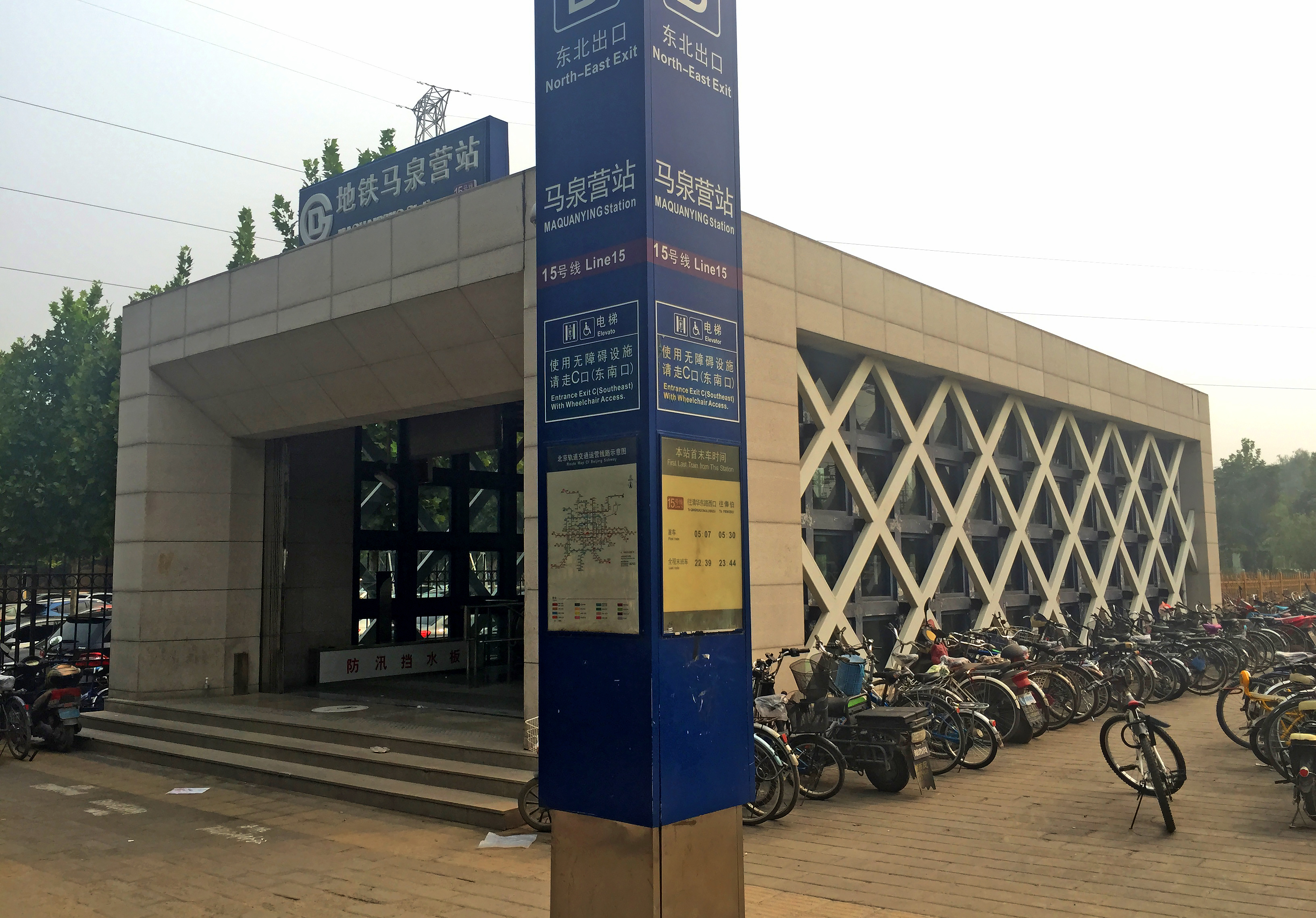
Exit B of Maquanying Station

== Exits ==
There are 3 exits, lettered A, B, and C. Exit C is accessible. Exit B has connections to Beijing Bus Route 944 and 988.
