= Beiyuanlubei station =

Beijing Subway station

Coordinates: 40°01′50″N 116°25′05″E

Beiyuanlubei 北苑路北
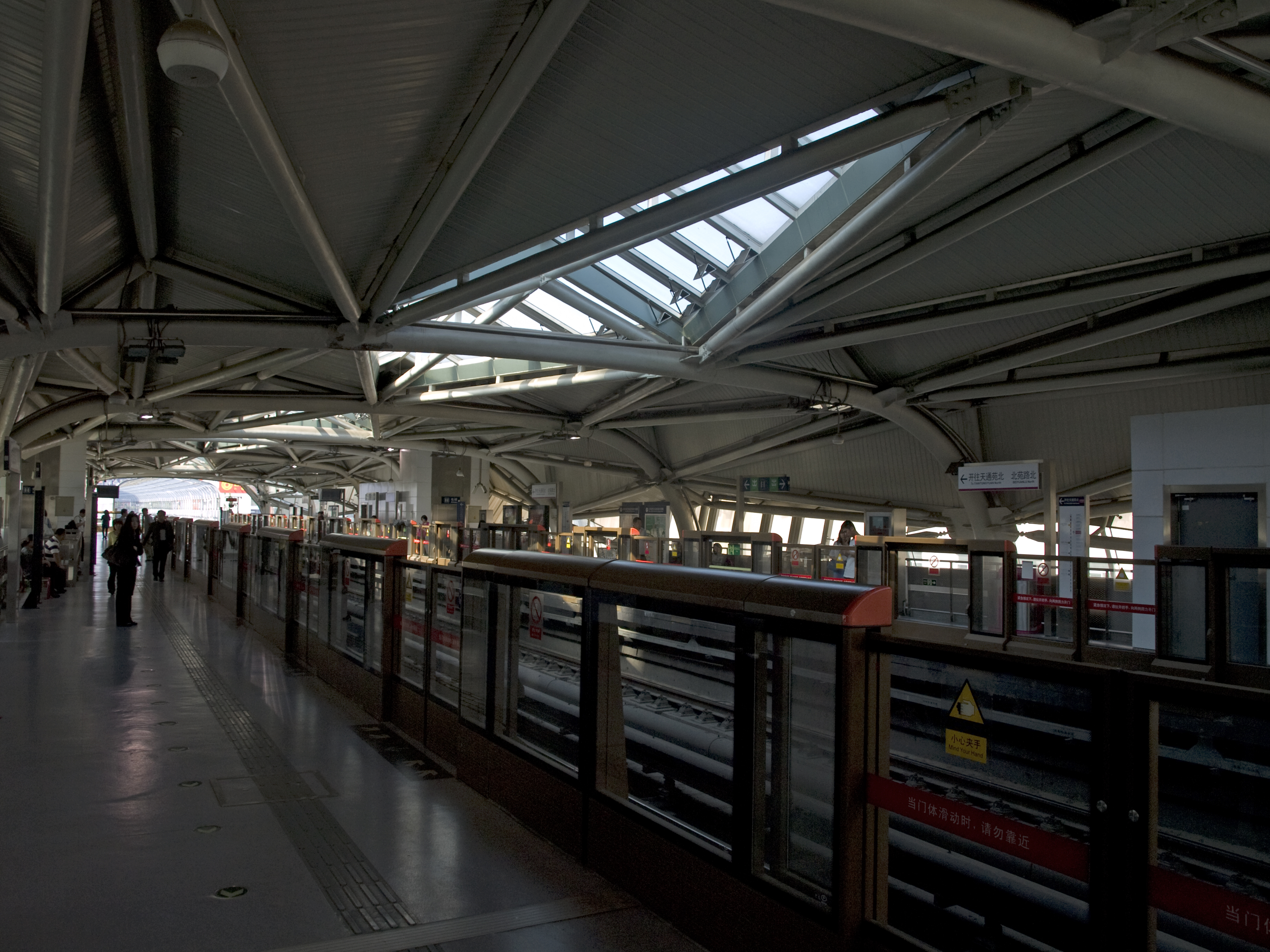
- Platform

General information
- Other names: Beiyuanxi (北苑西)
- Location: Beiyuan Road (北苑路) and Fulin East Street (拂林东街); Chaoyang District, Beijing; China
- Operator: Beijing Mass Transit Railway Operation Corporation Limited
- Line: Line 5
- Platforms: 2 (2 side platforms)
- Tracks: 2

Construction
- Structure type: Elevated
- Accessible: Yes

History
- Opened: October 7, 2007

Services
Preceding station	Beijing Subway	Following station
Lishuiqiaonan towards Tiantongyuanbei	Line 5	Datunludong towards Songjiazhuang
Location
- Location within Beijing

Beiyuanlubei station (Chinese: 北苑路北站; pinyin: Běiyuànlù Běi Zhàn) is a station on Line 5 of the Beijing Subway.

== Station layout ==
The station has 2 elevated side platforms.

== Exits ==
There are 4 exits, lettered A1, A2, B1, and B2. Exit B2 is accessible.
