= Lishuiqiaonan station =

Beijing Subway station

Lishuiqiaonan 立水桥南
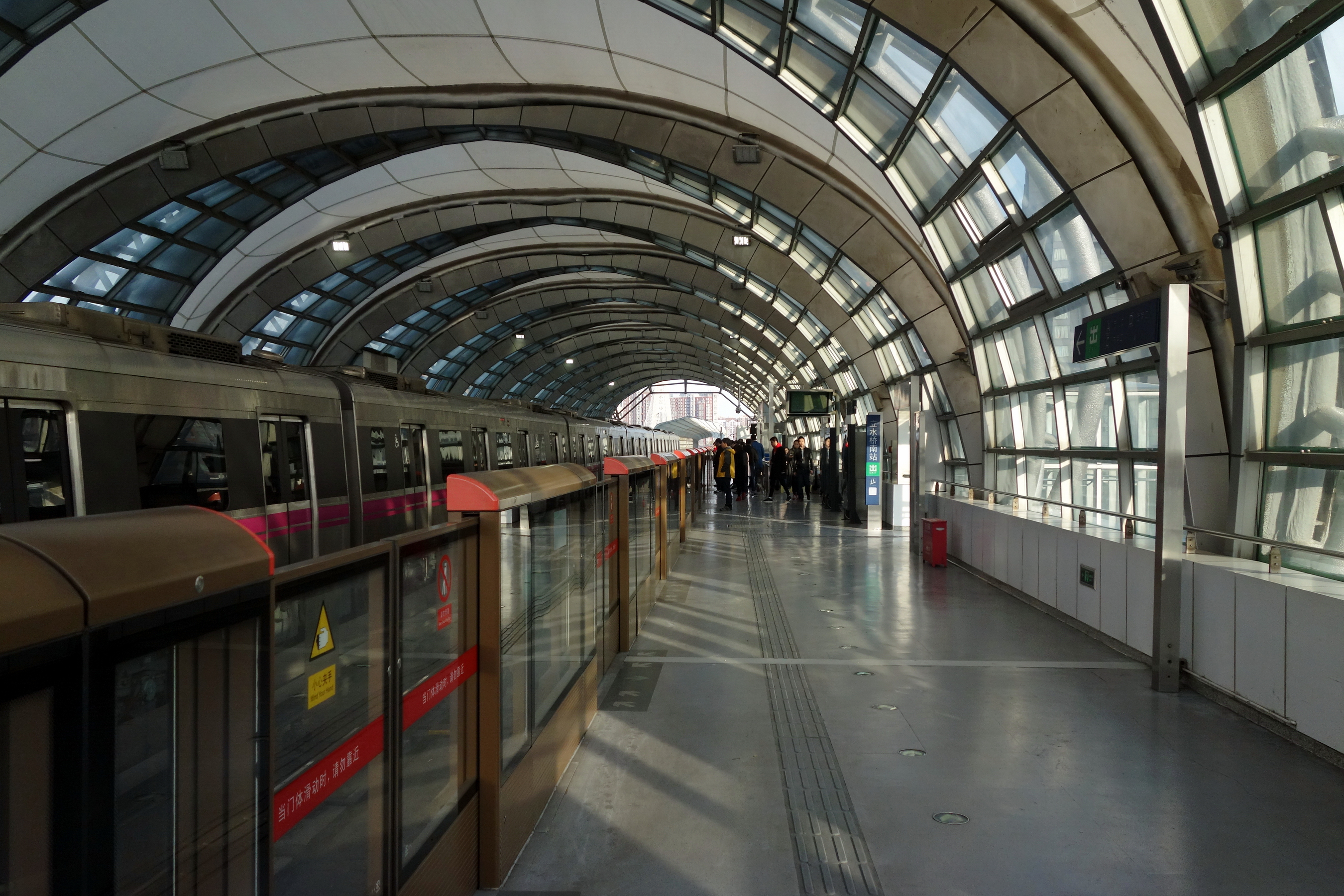
- Platform

General information
- Location: Beiyuan Road (北苑路) and Chunhua Road (春华路); Chaoyang District, Beijing; China
- Coordinates: 40°02′31″N 116°24′52″E
- Operator: Beijing Mass Transit Railway Operation Corporation Limited
- Line: Line 5
- Platforms: 2 (2 side platforms)
- Tracks: 2

Construction
- Structure type: Elevated
- Accessible: Yes

History
- Opened: October 7, 2007; 18 years ago

Services
Preceding station	Beijing Subway	Following station
Lishui Qiao towards Tiantongyuanbei	Line 5	Beiyuanlubei towards Songjiazhuang
Location
- Location within Beijing

Lishuiqiaonan Station (simplified Chinese: 立水桥南站; traditional Chinese: 立水橋南站; pinyin: Lìshuǐqiáo Nán Zhàn) is a station on Line 5 of the Beijing Subway.

== Station layout ==
The station has 2 elevated side platforms.

== Exits ==
There are 3 exits, lettered A, C, and D. Exit D is accessible.
