= Guanzhuang station (Line 15) =

Beijing Subway station

Coordinates: 40°00′04″N 116°25′51″E

Guanzhuang 关庄
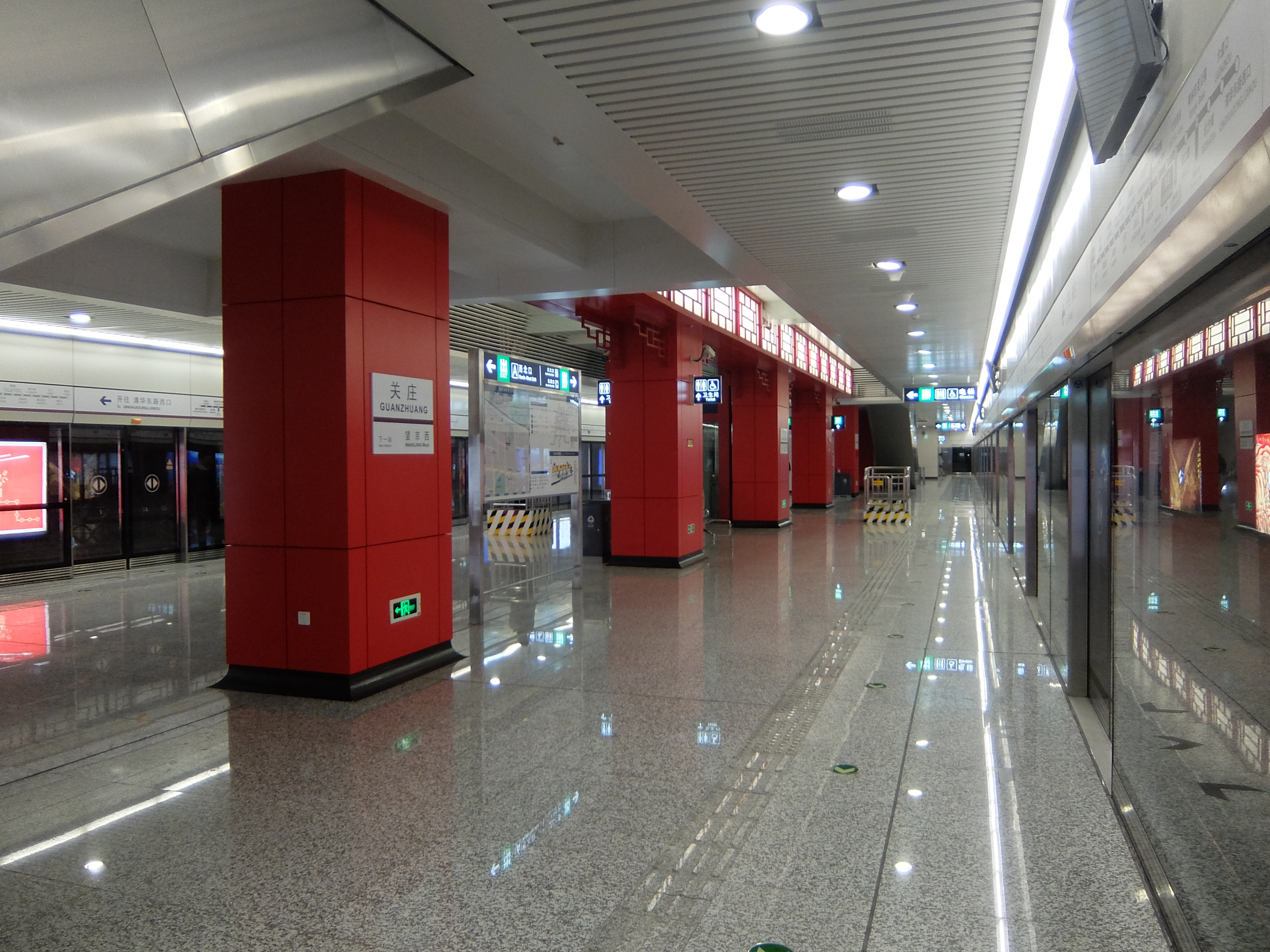
- Platform

General information
- Location: Beiguanzhuang Road (北关庄路) and Beihuqu West Road (北湖渠西路); Datun Subdistrict, Chaoyang District, Beijing; China
- Operator: Beijing Mass Transit Railway Operation Corporation Limited
- Line: Line 15
- Platforms: 2 (1 island platform)
- Tracks: 2

Construction
- Structure type: Underground
- Accessible: Yes

History
- Opened: December 28, 2014; 11 years ago

Services
Preceding station	Beijing Subway	Following station
Datunludong towards Qinghua Donglu Xikou	Line 15	Wangjingxi towards Fengbo
Location
- Location within Beijing

Guanzhuang station (simplified Chinese: 关庄站; traditional Chinese: 關莊站; pinyin: Guānzhuāng zhàn) is a station on Line 15 of the Beijing Subway. It was opened on December 28, 2014.

== Name conflict ==
This station had the same English name as a station on the Batong line, also part of the Beijing Subway system. In Chinese this is not a problem as the station on Line 15 is called 关庄 and the one on the Batong Line is called 管庄, but the government policy is to create English names from the pinyin transliteration of Chinese language, but without the tone markers; thus 关庄 (Guānzhuāng) and 管庄 (Guǎnzhuāng) are both rendered as Guanzhuang, making them look identical.

In December 2019, the 管庄 (Guǎnzhuāng) station on Batong line changed spelling to Guaanzhuang.

== Station layout ==
The station has an underground island platform.

== Exits ==
There are 3 exits, lettered A, B, and C. Exit B is accessible.

== Gallery ==
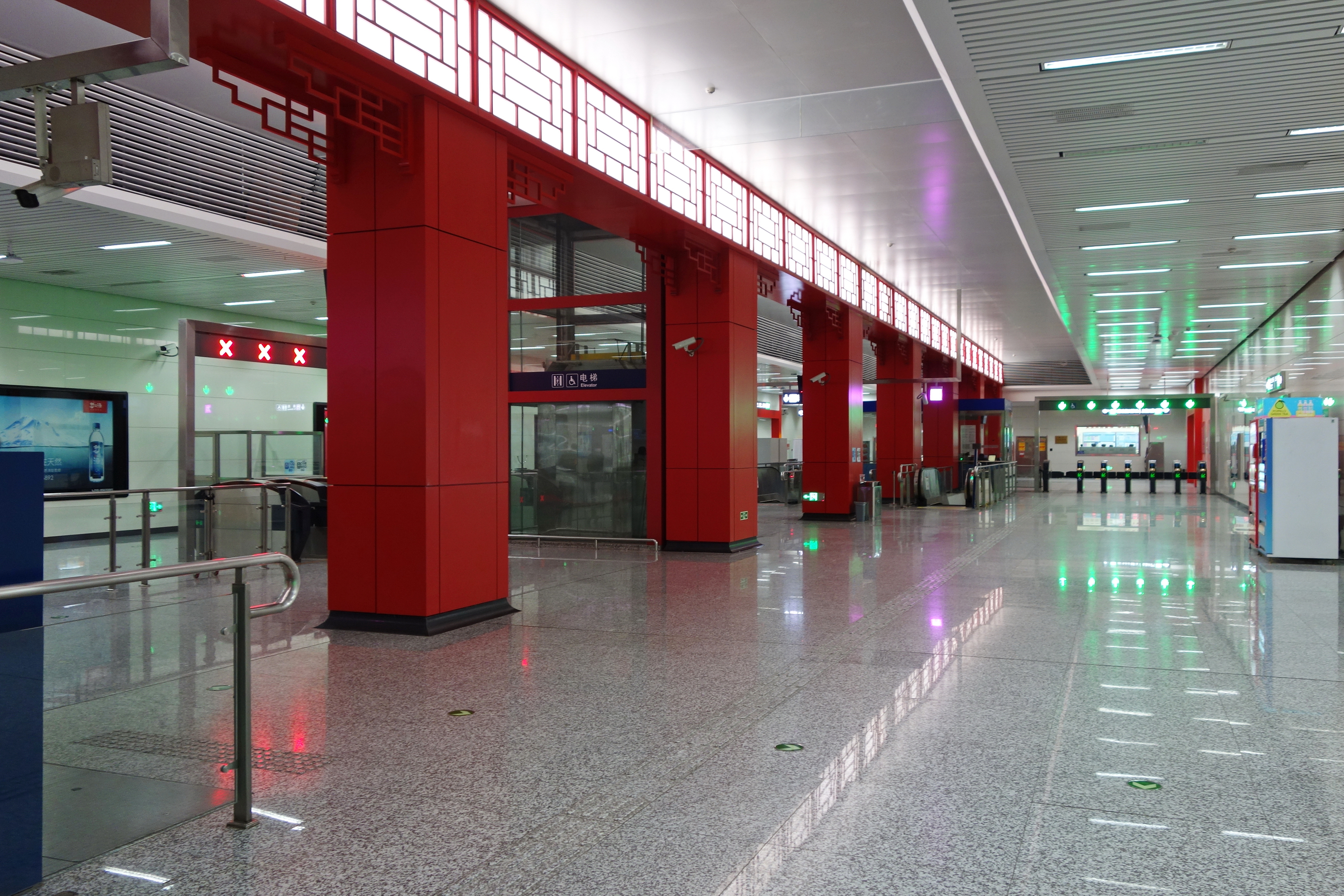
Concourse

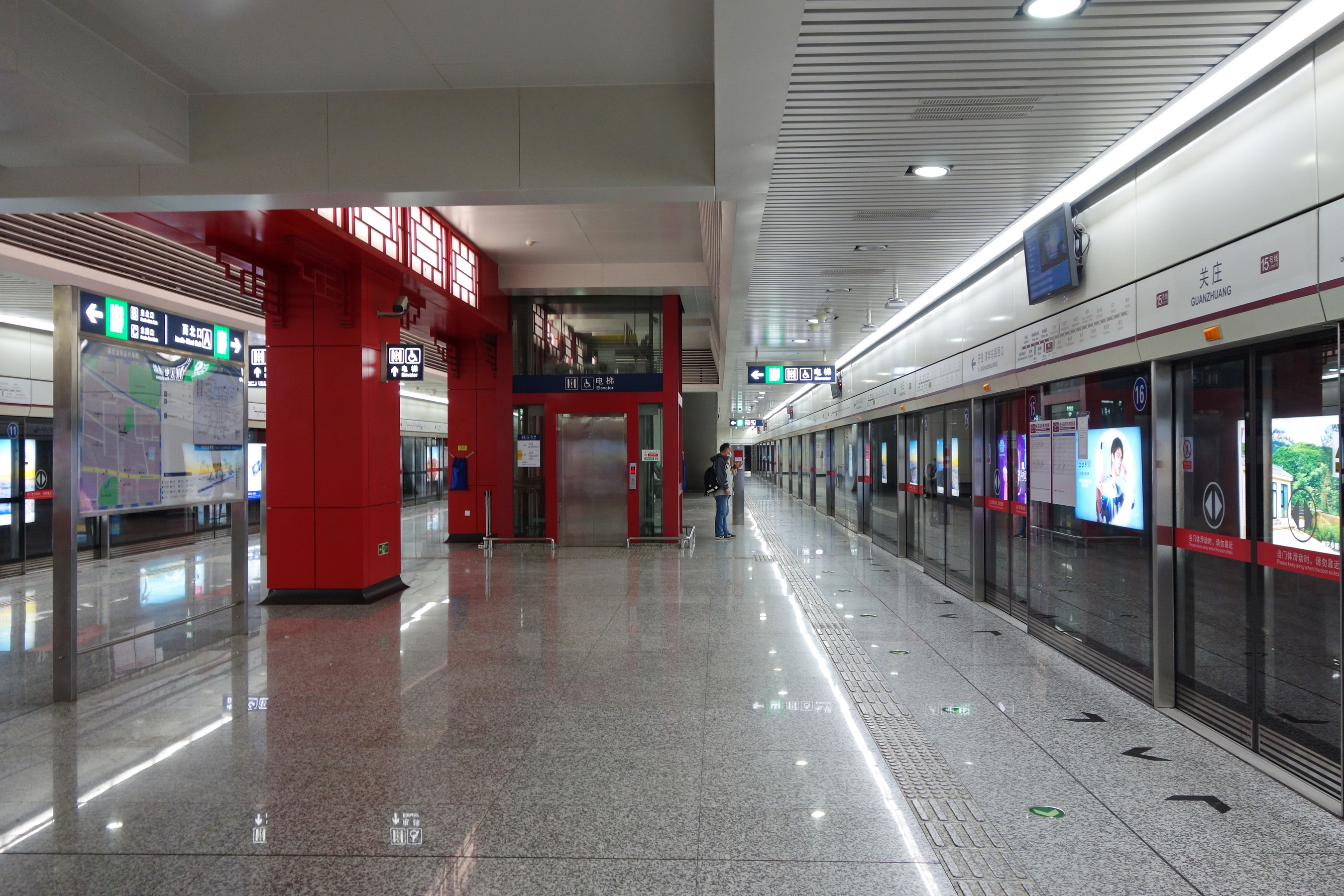
Platform
