= Aolinpike Gongyuan (Olympic Park) station =

Beijing Subway interchange station

Aolinpike Gongyuan (Olympic Park) 奥林匹克公园
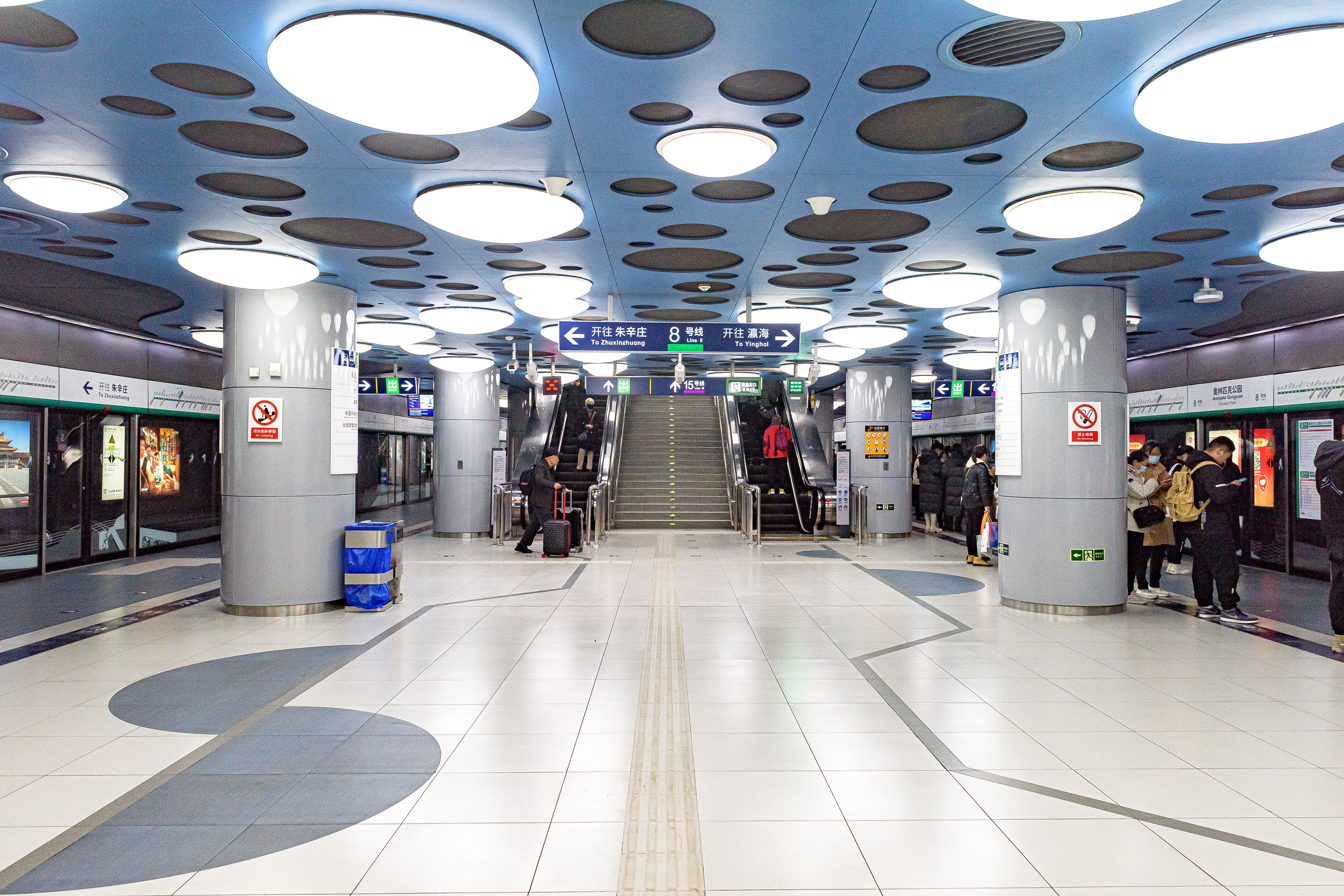
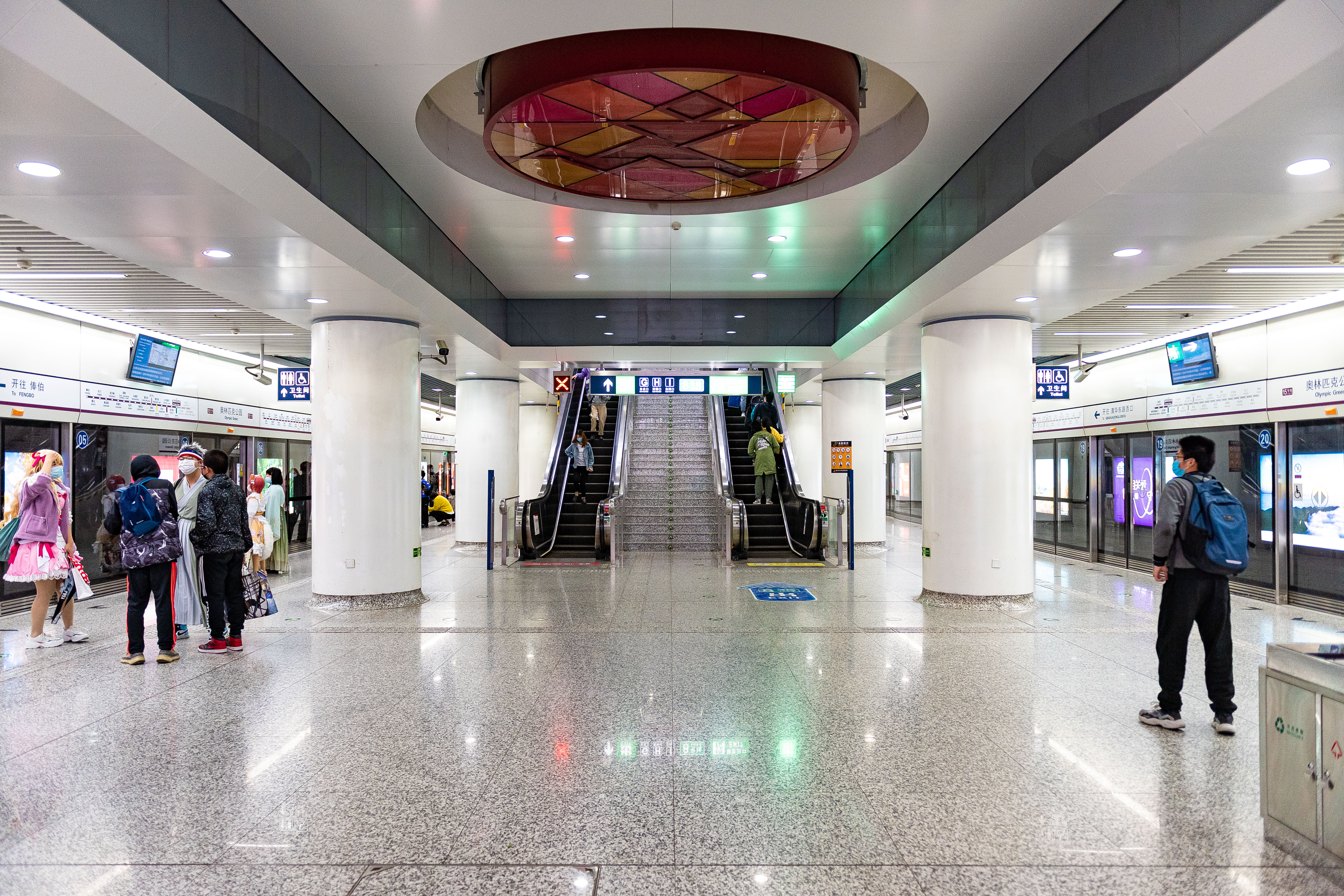
- Line 8 platform Line 15 platform

General information
- Location: Datun Road (大屯路) and Tianchen East Road (天辰东路); Olympic Green, Chaoyang District, Beijing; China
- Coordinates: 40°00′08″N 116°23′30″E
- Operator: Beijing Mass Transit Railway Operation Corporation Limited
- Lines: Line 8; Line 15
- Platforms: 4 (2 island platforms)
- Tracks: 4

Construction
- Structure type: Underground
- Accessible: Yes

History
- Opened: July 19, 2008; 18 years ago (Line 8); December 28, 2014; 11 years ago (Line 15)
- Former names: Olympic Green (2008–2020)

Services
Preceding station	Beijing Subway	Following station
Forest Park South Gate towards Zhuxinzhuang	Line 8	Olympic Sports Center towards Yinghai
Beishatan towards Qinghua Donglu Xikou	Line 15	Anli Lu towards Fengbo
Location
- Location within Beijing

Aolinpike Gongyuan (Olympic Park) station (simplified Chinese: 奥林匹克公园站; traditional Chinese: 奧林匹克公園站; pinyin: Àolínpǐkè Gōngyuán zhàn) is an interchange station on Line 8 and Line 15 of the Beijing Subway.

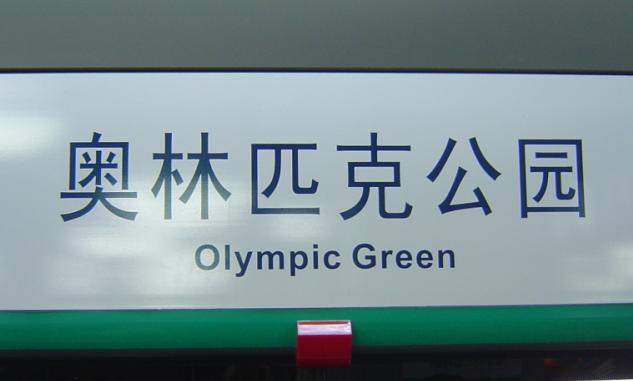
Line 8 sign

The station was named Olympic Green. It was renamed on December 31, 2021, to use Pinyin, though the English translation are still displayed in brackets underneath.

== Location ==
It is located in Chaoyang District, Beijing. Outside the station is Olympic Green. The Olympic Green was built for the 2008 Summer Olympics.

== Station layout ==
The Olympic Park Station on Line 8 is a two-story underground station with an island platform design. The main body of the station is 228.2 meters long and 24.9 meters wide. The station consists of two parts: the southern half is the platform for the Line 8 subway, and the northern half is the underground transfer platform for subway and express bus transfers (which is not yet open as of 2026). Passengers will be able to directly access the bus stop from the subway platform to transfer to a bus.

The Olympic Park Station on Line 15 is a two-story, three-span underground station also with an island platform design. The main body of the station, located below the Datun Road Tunnel, was constructed using the cut-and-cover method. The station is 205.5 metres long and 23.3 metres wide in its standard section.

== Exits ==
There are 7 exits, lettered B, D, E, F, G, H, and I. Exit F is accessible.

== Gallery ==
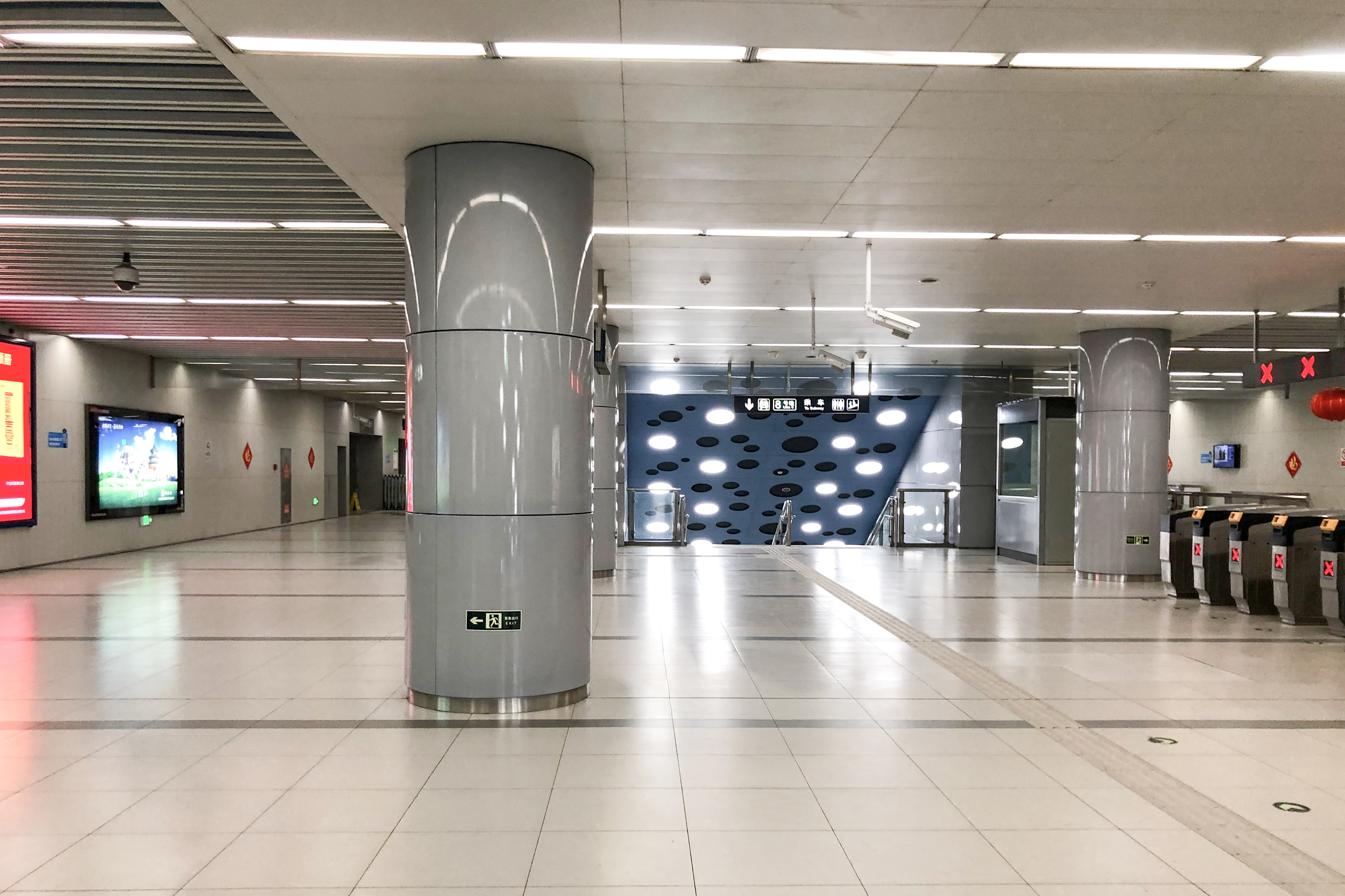
Line 8 Concourse

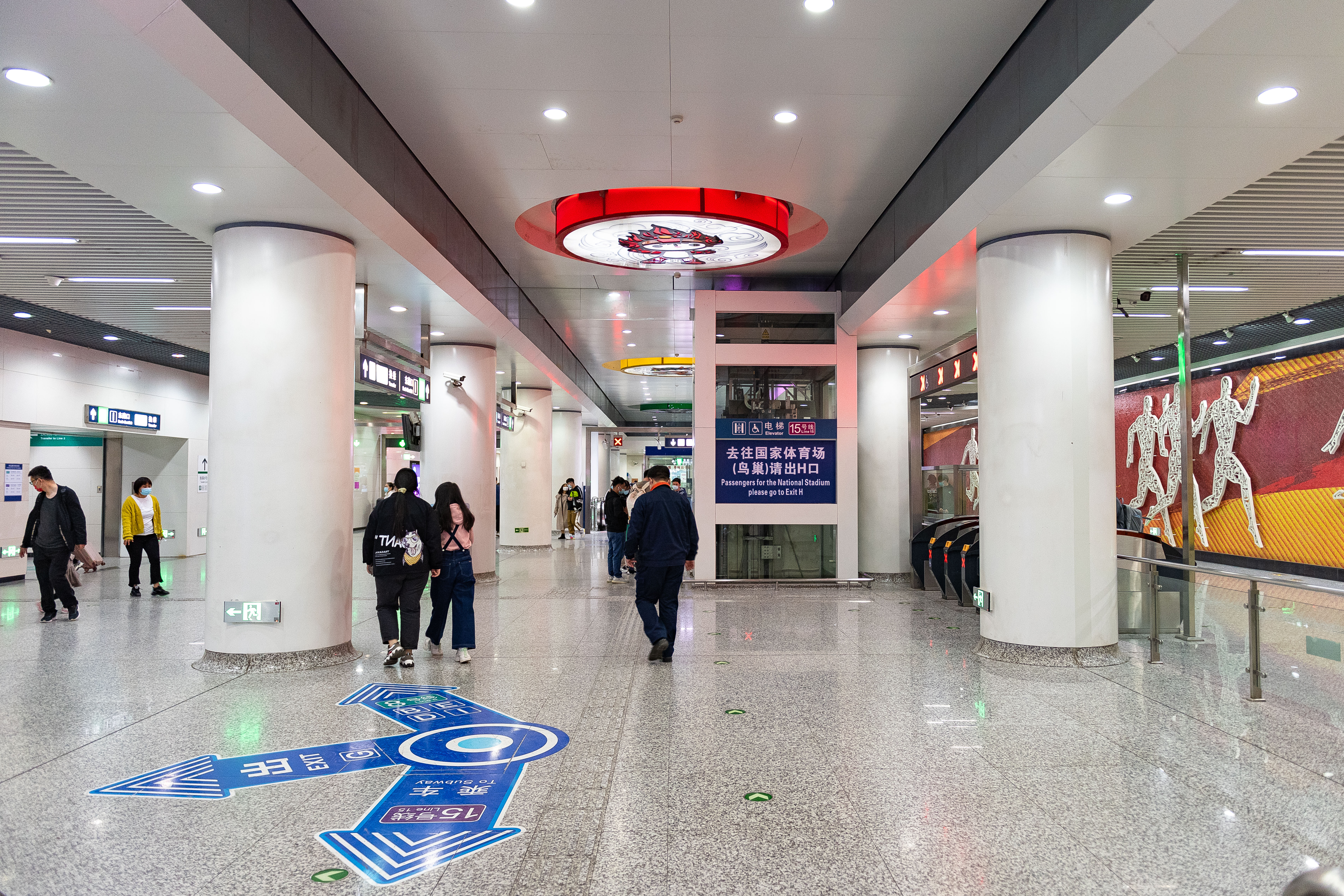
Line 15 Concourse

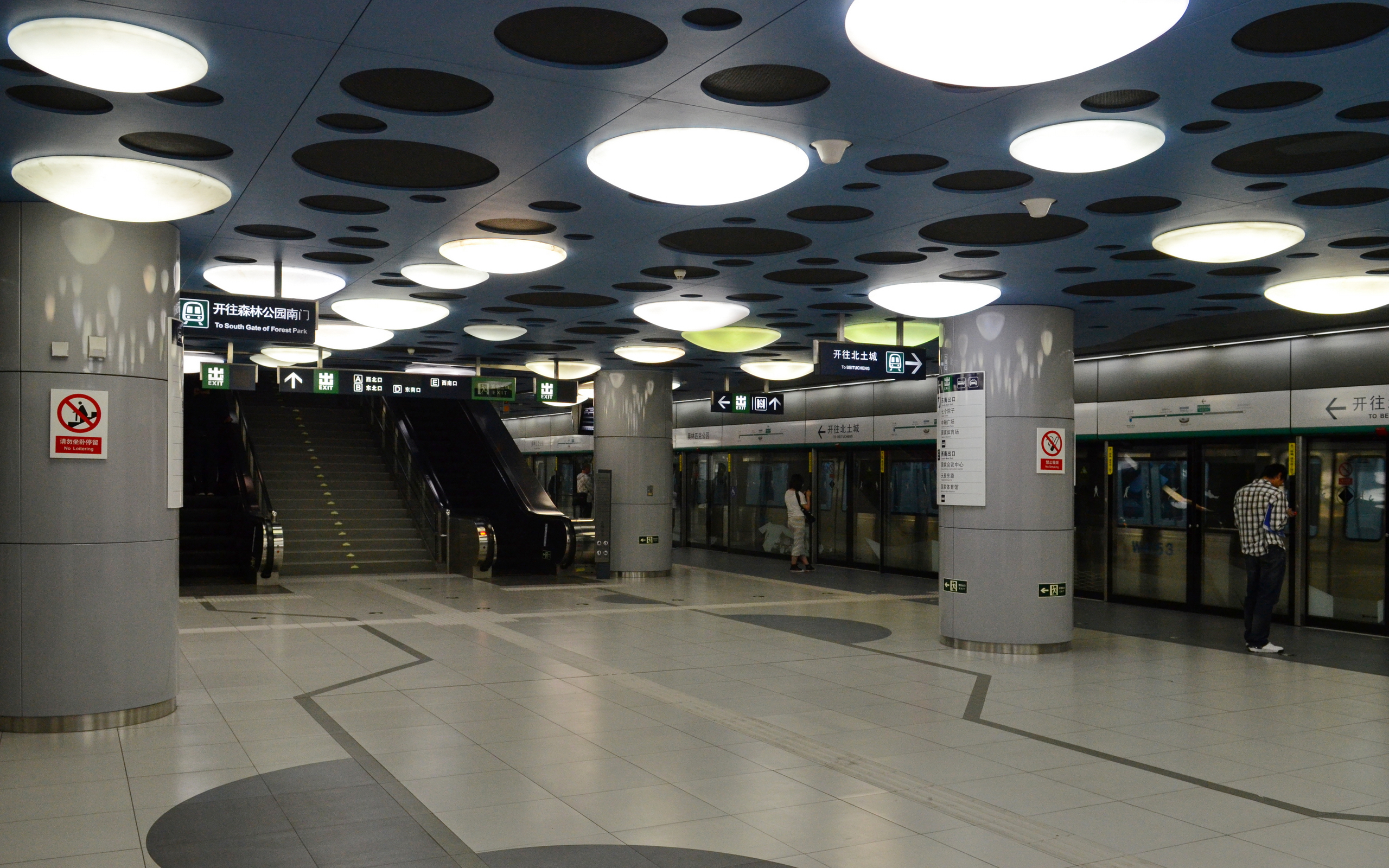
A DKZ15 train of Line 10 at Olympic Green in May 2011

== See also ==
- Olympic Green
