= Sunhe station =

Beijing Subway station

Sunhe 孙河
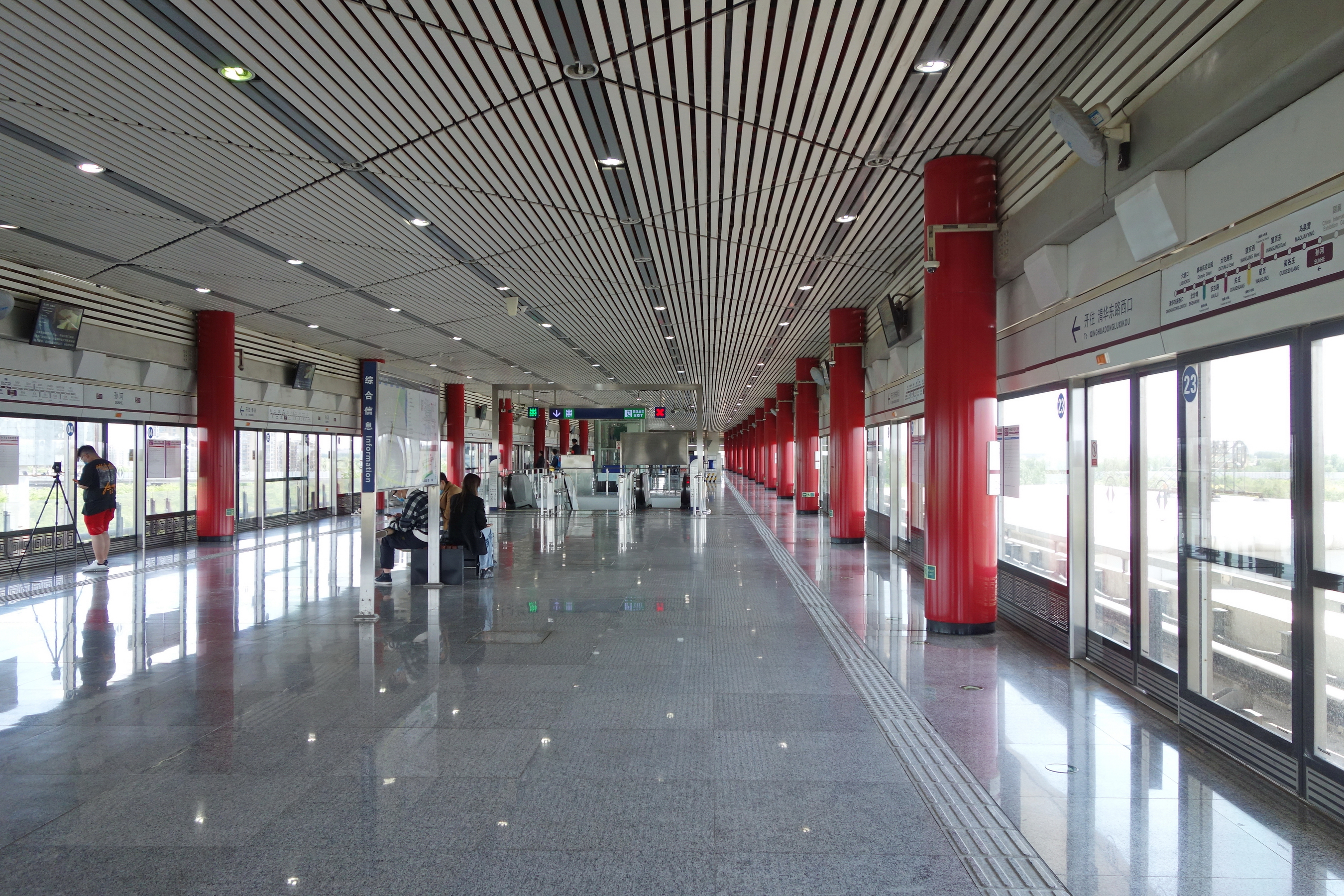
- Platform

General information
- Location: National Highway 101 (Jingmi Road); Chaoyang District, Beijing; China
- Coordinates: 40°02′42″N 116°32′05″E
- Operator: Beijing Mass Transit Railway Operation Corporation Limited
- Line: Line 15
- Platforms: 2 (1 island platform)
- Tracks: 2

Construction
- Structure type: Elevated
- Accessible: Yes

History
- Opened: December 30, 2010; 15 years ago

Services
| Preceding station | Beijing Subway | Following station |
|---|---|---|
| Maquanying towards Qinghua Donglu Xikou | Line 15 | China Int'l Exhibition Center towards Fengbo |
Location
- Location within Beijing

Sunhe Station (simplified Chinese: 孙河站; traditional Chinese: 孫河站; pinyin: Sūnhé Zhàn) is a station on Line 15 of the Beijing Subway.

== Station layout ==
The station has an elevated island platform.

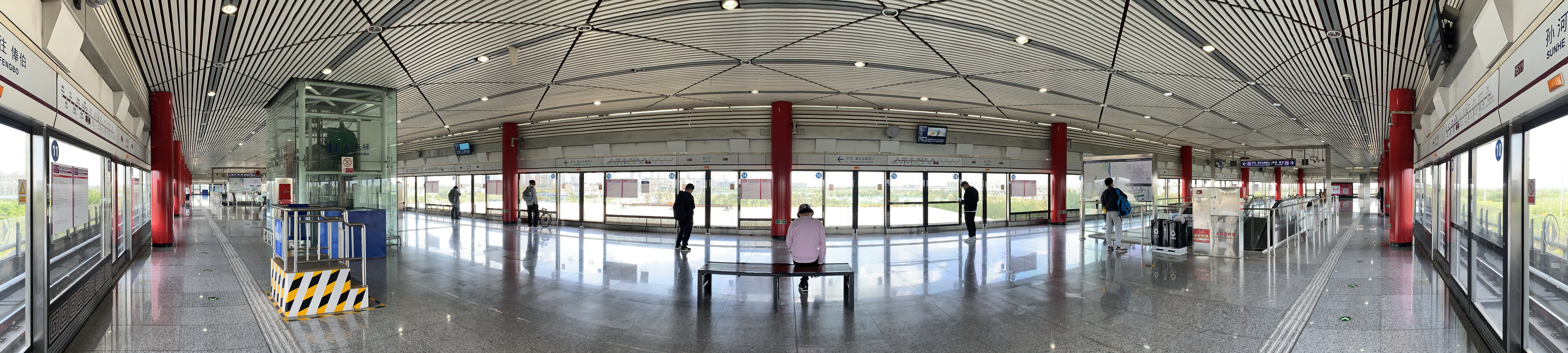
Platform panorama of Sunhe Station（May 2021)

== Exits ==
There are 2 exits, lettered A and D. Both are accessible.

== Gallery ==
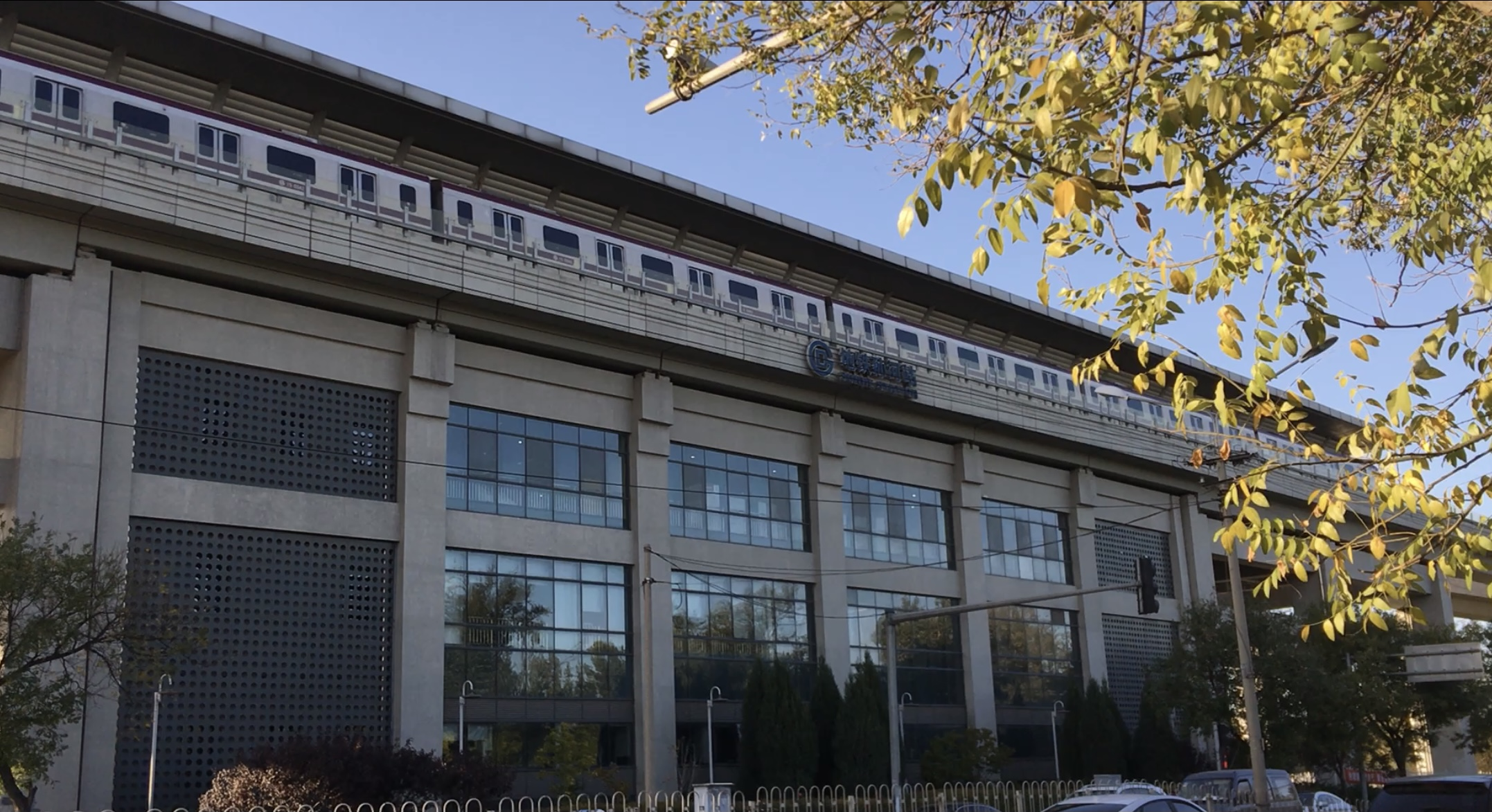
Exterior of Sunhe Station viewed from National Highway 101 in 2019

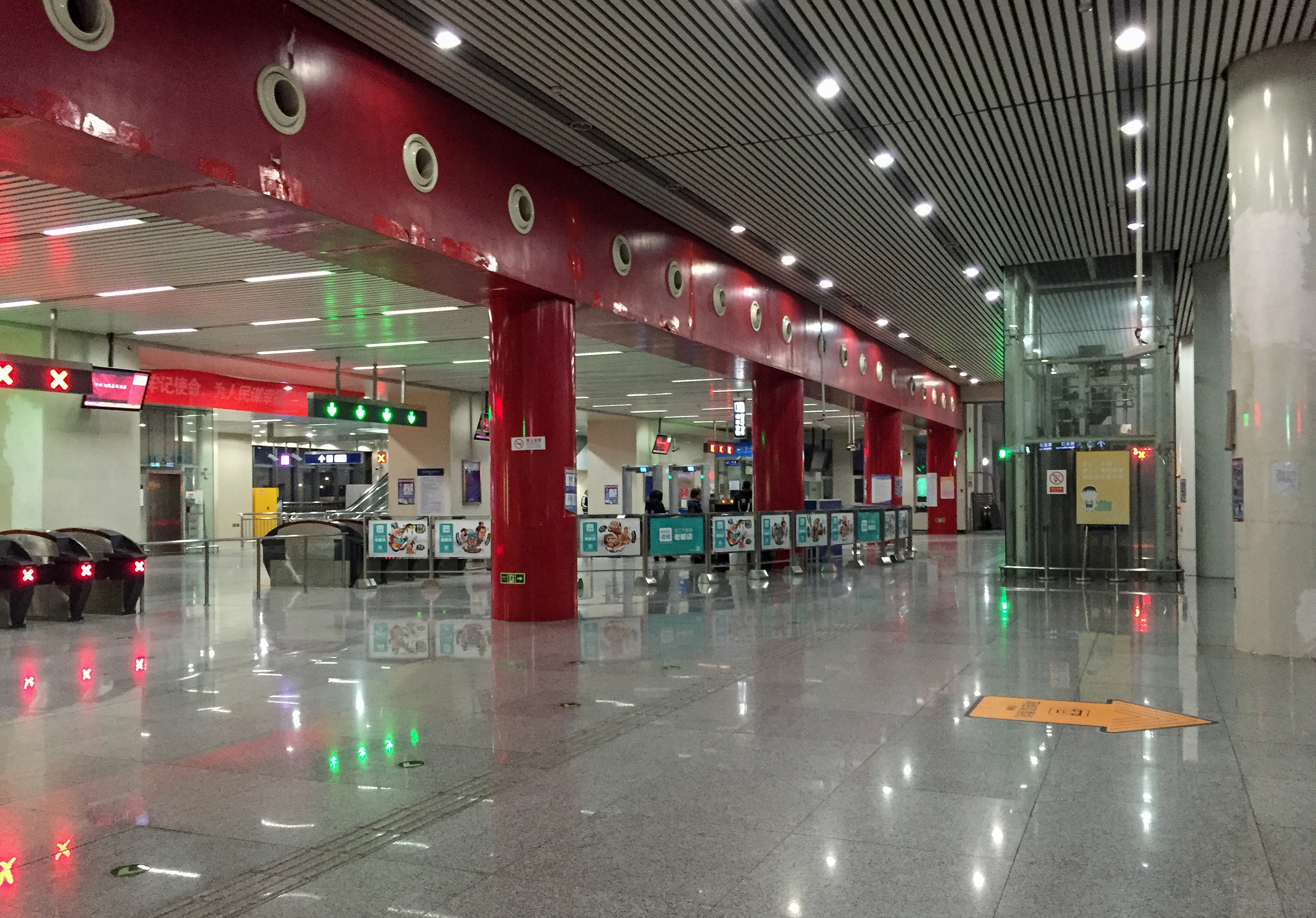
Concourse

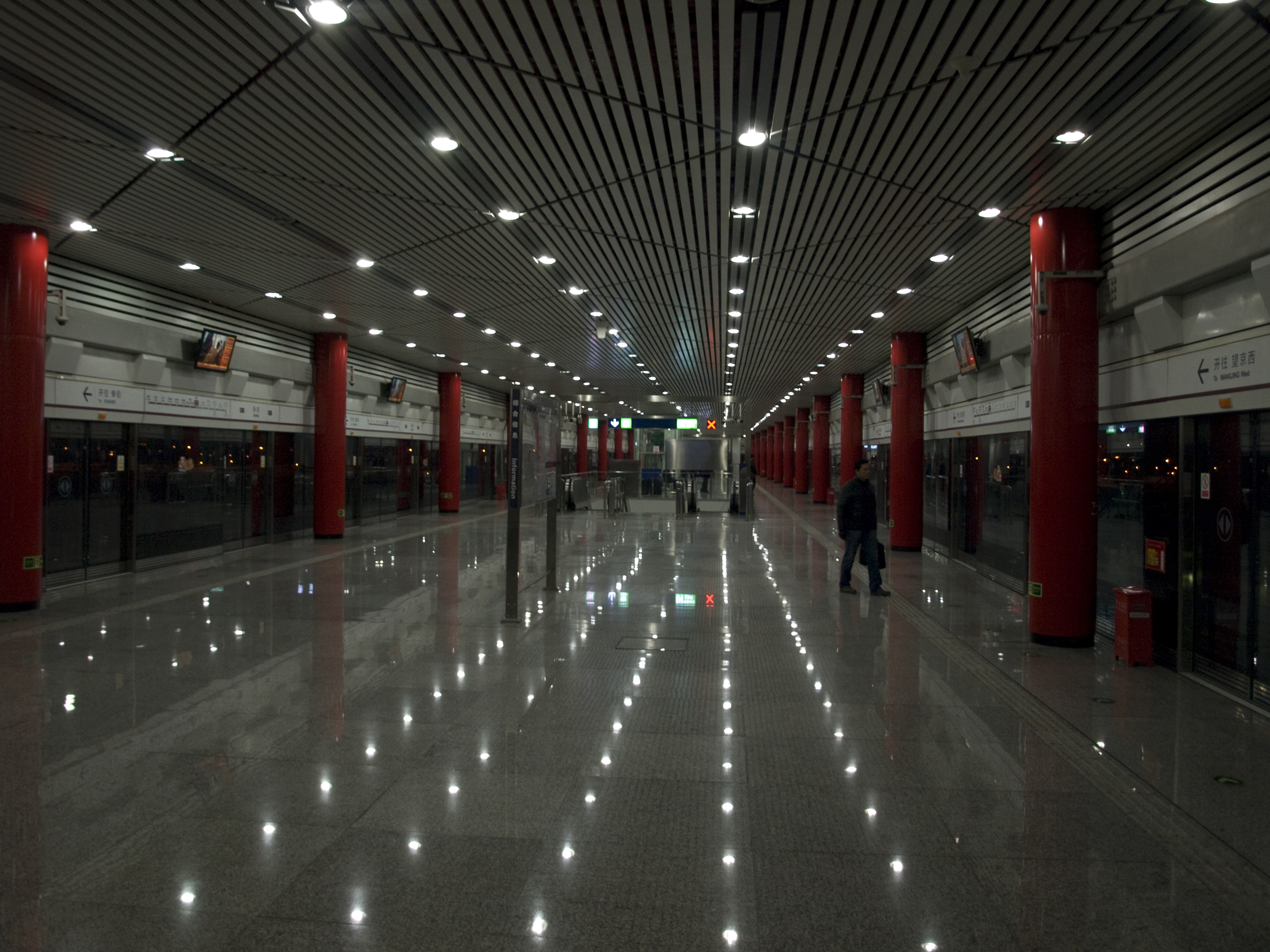
Platform
