= Datunludong station =

Beijing Subway interchange station

Datunludong 大屯路东
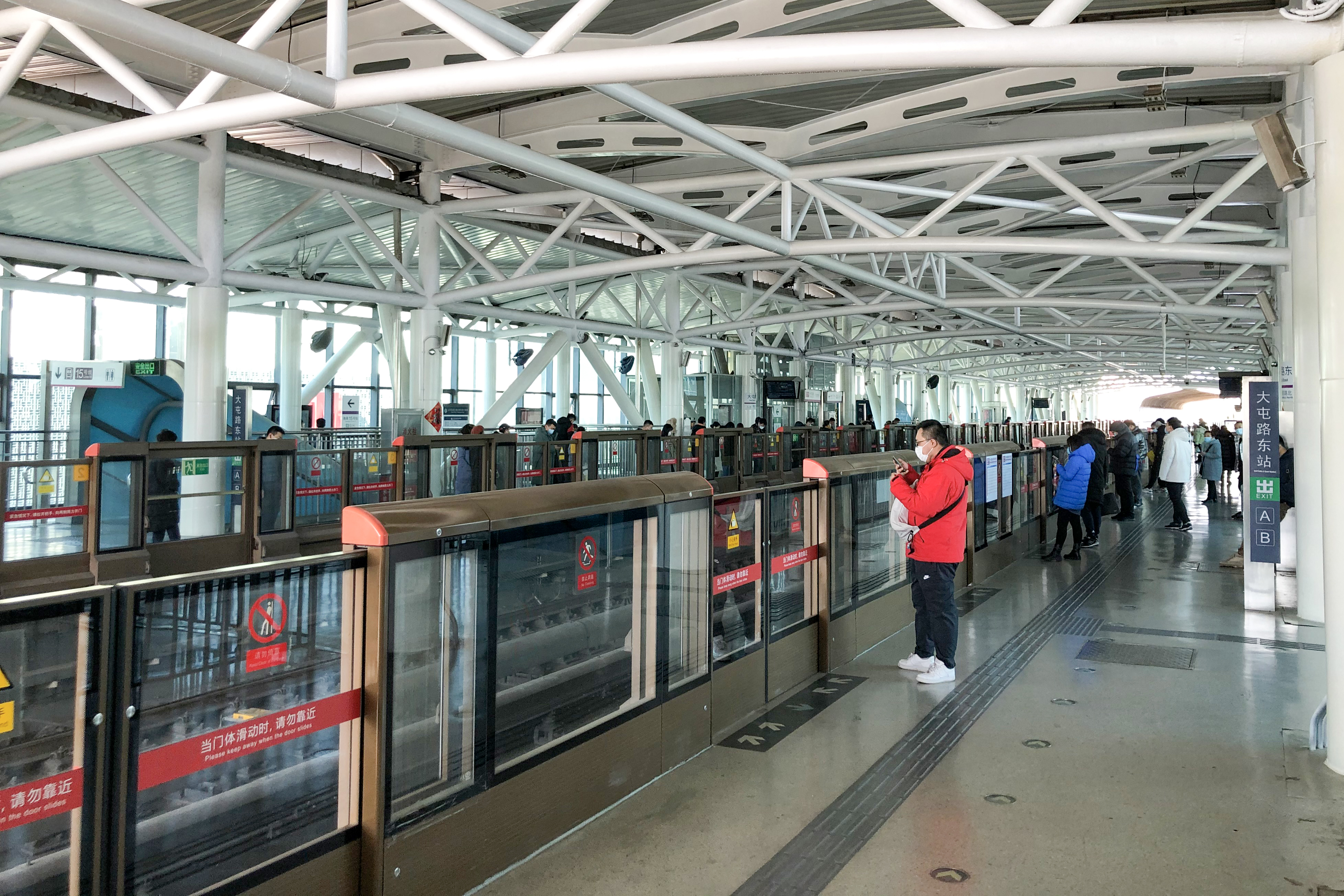
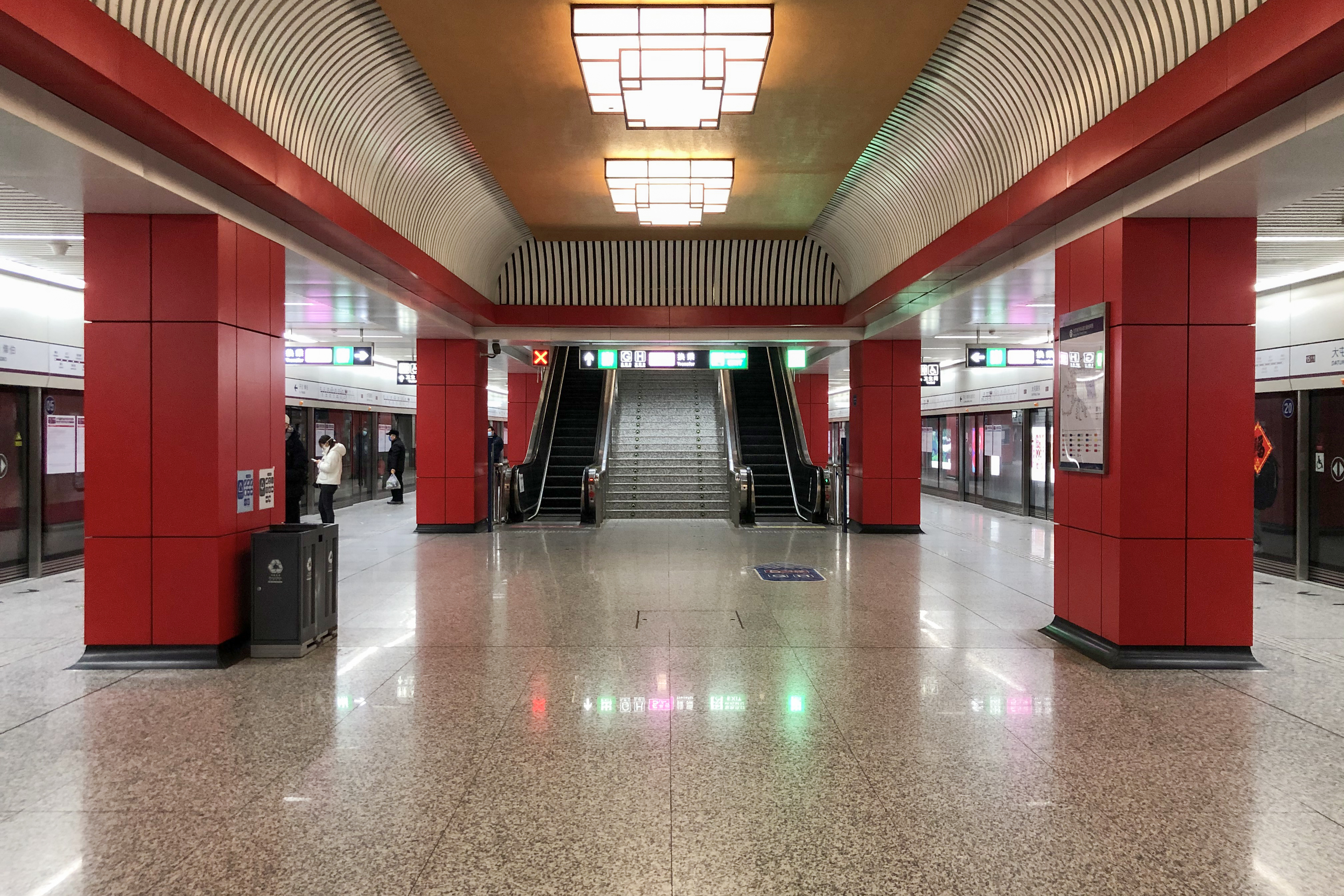
- Line 5 northbound platform Line 15 platform

General information
- Other names: Datundong (大屯东)
- Location: Beiyuan Road (北苑路) and Datun Road (大屯路); Datun Subdistrict, Chaoyang District, Beijing; China
- Coordinates: 40°00′14″N 116°25′03″E
- Operator: Beijing Mass Transit Railway Operation Corporation Limited
- Lines: Line 5; Line 15
- Platforms: 4 (1 island platform and 2 side platforms)
- Tracks: 4

Construction
- Structure type: Elevated (Line 5); Underground (Line 15)
- Accessible: Yes

History
- Opened: October 7, 2007; 18 years ago (Line 5); December 26, 2015; 10 years ago (Line 15)

Services
Preceding station	Beijing Subway	Following station
Beiyuanlubei towards Tiantongyuanbei	Line 5	Huixin Xijie Beikou towards Songjiazhuang
Anli Lu towards Qinghua Donglu Xikou	Line 15	Guanzhuang towards Fengbo
Location
- Location within Beijing

Datunludong station (simplified Chinese: 大屯路东站; traditional Chinese: 大屯路東站; pinyin: Dàtúnlù Dōng Zhàn) is an interchange station of Line 5 and Line 15 on the Beijing Subway.

The station, along with Maquanying station, serves as a terminus for certain weekday rush hour and late hour Line 15 services to and from Fengbo and Maquanying.

== History ==
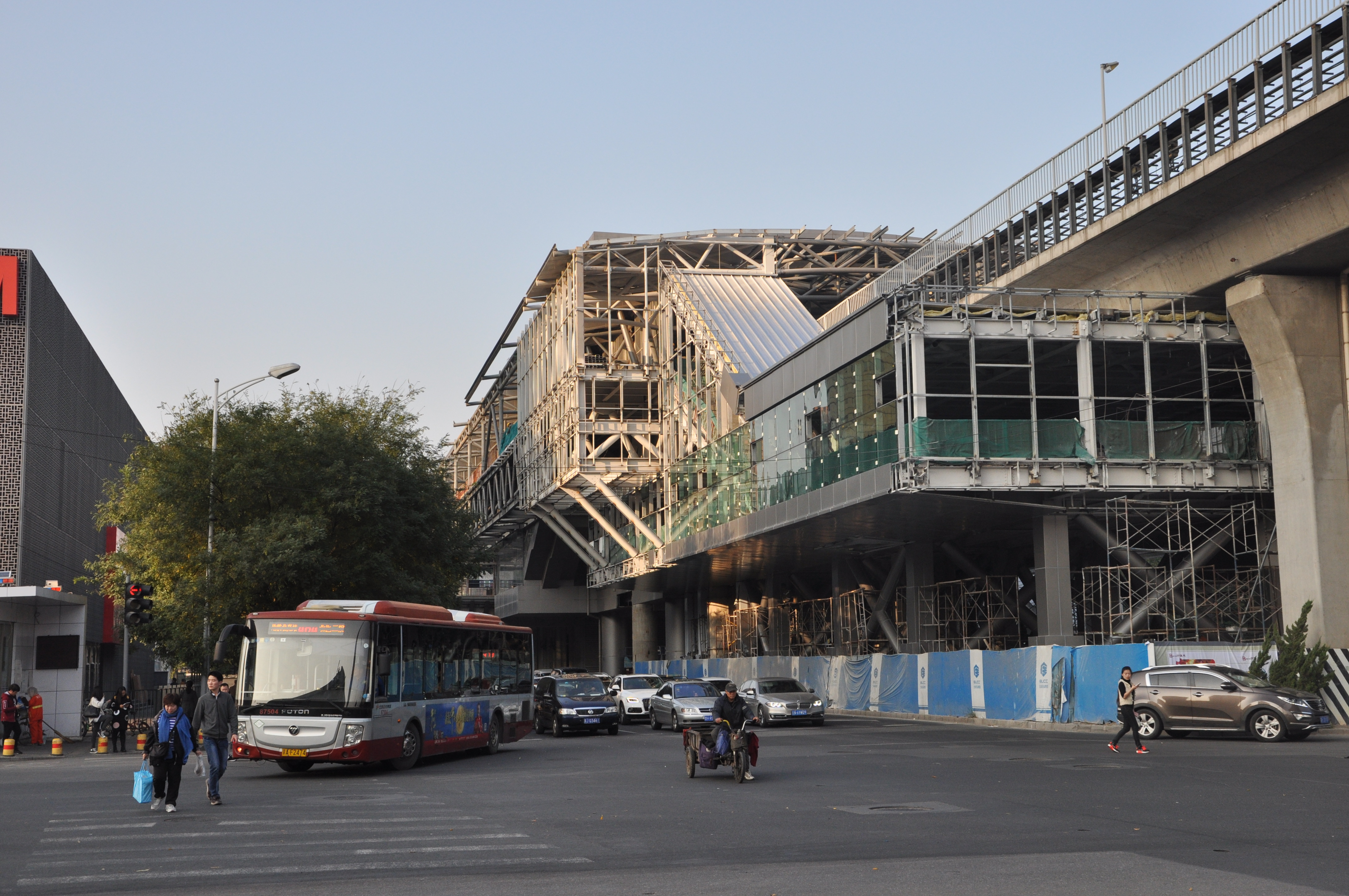
Interchange corridor under construction

The line 5 station opened on October 27, 2007. It was too small to handle the interchange between line 5 and 15, so the line 15 station was left unopened when the western extension was opened in December 2014. From October to December 2015, the line 5 station was closed to widen the station and build a transfer corridor. The line 15 station opened on December 26, 2015, one year later than the other stations on the line.

== Station layout ==
The line 5 station has 2 elevated side platforms. The line 15 station has an underground island platform.

== Exits ==
There are 5 exits in operation, lettered A1, B1, B2, G, and H2. Exits A1, B1 and G are accessible.

Exit H1 is under planning.

== Gallery ==
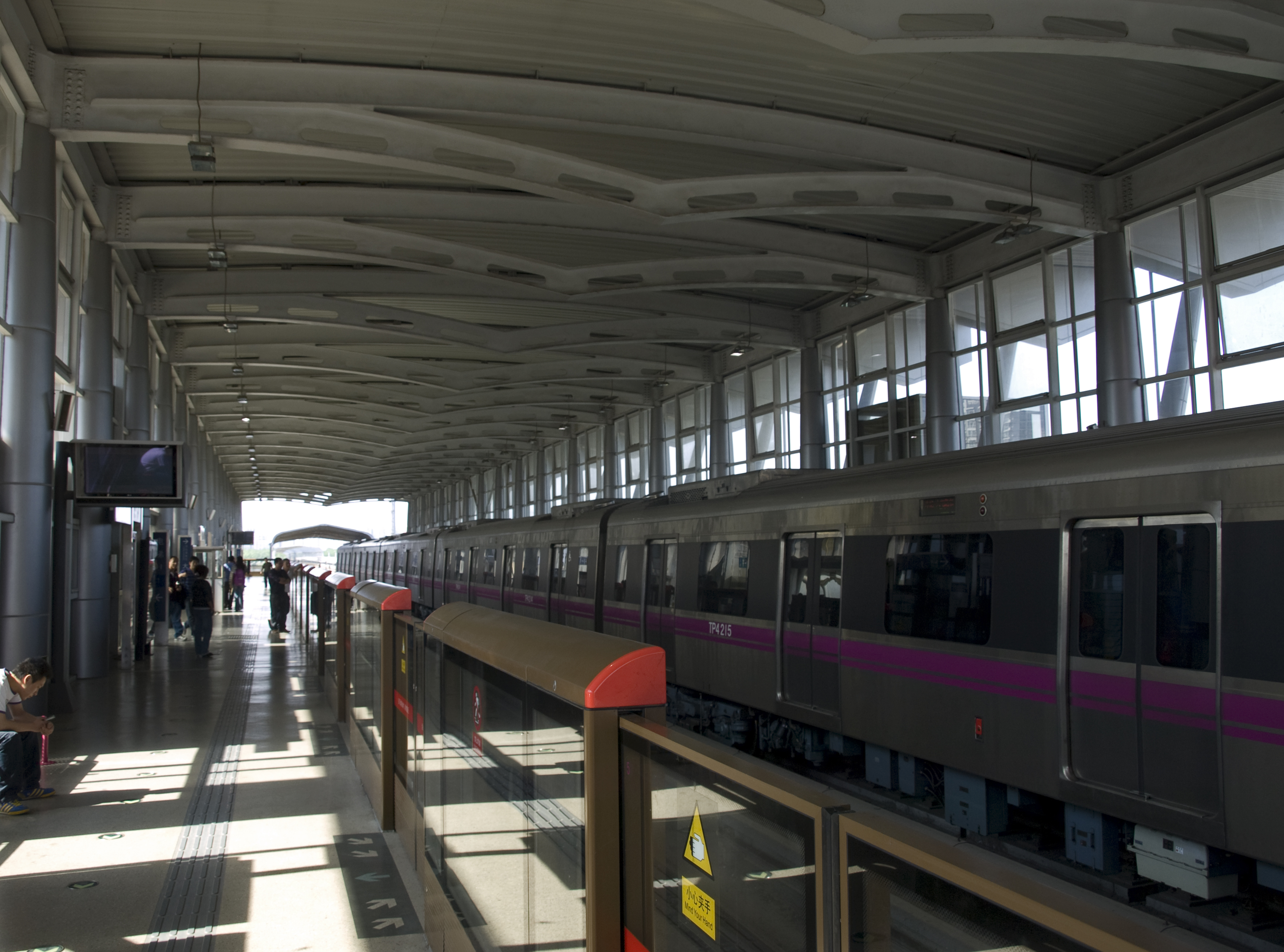
Line 5 platform before renovation

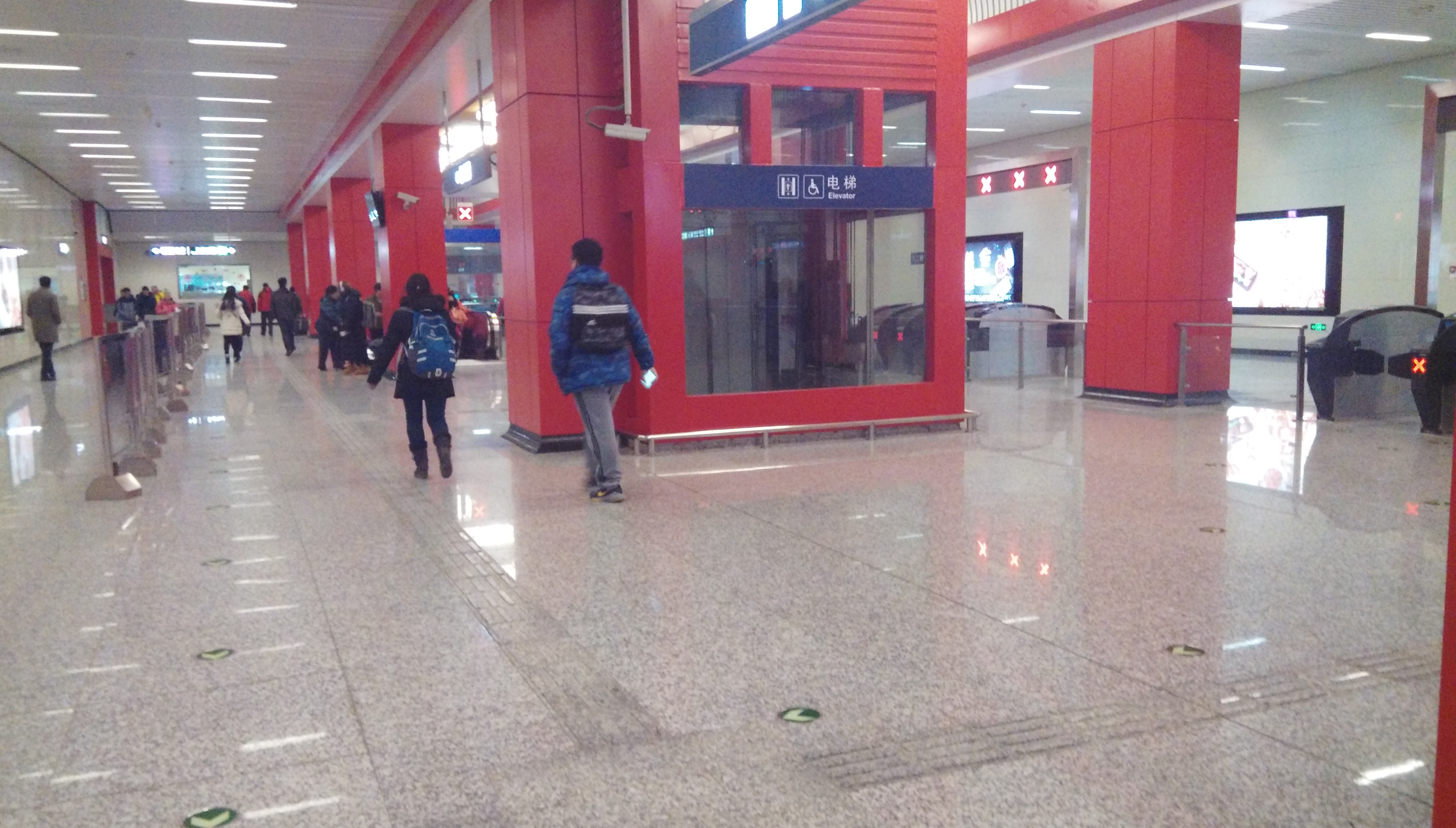
Line 15 station hall

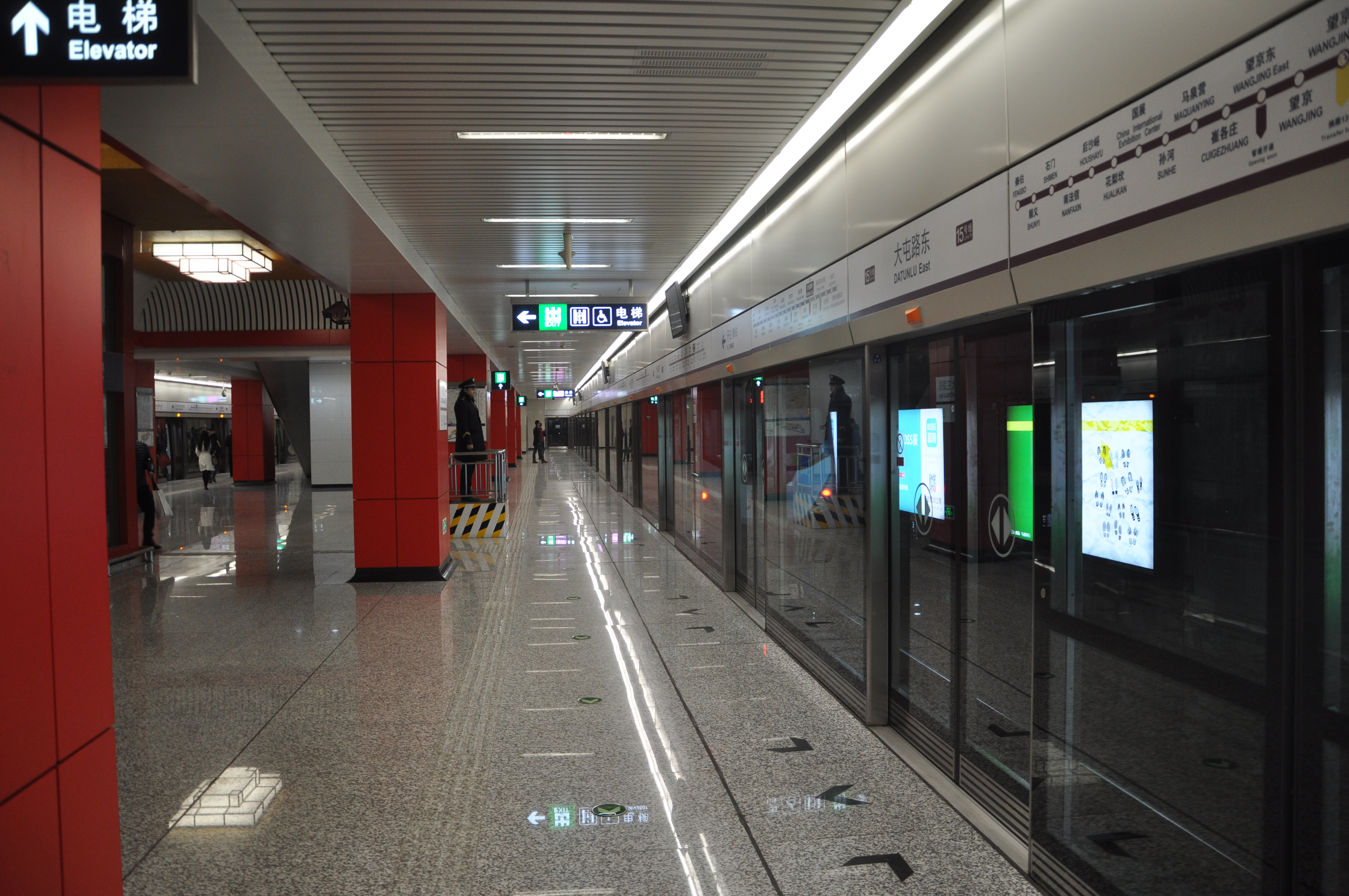
Line 15 platform

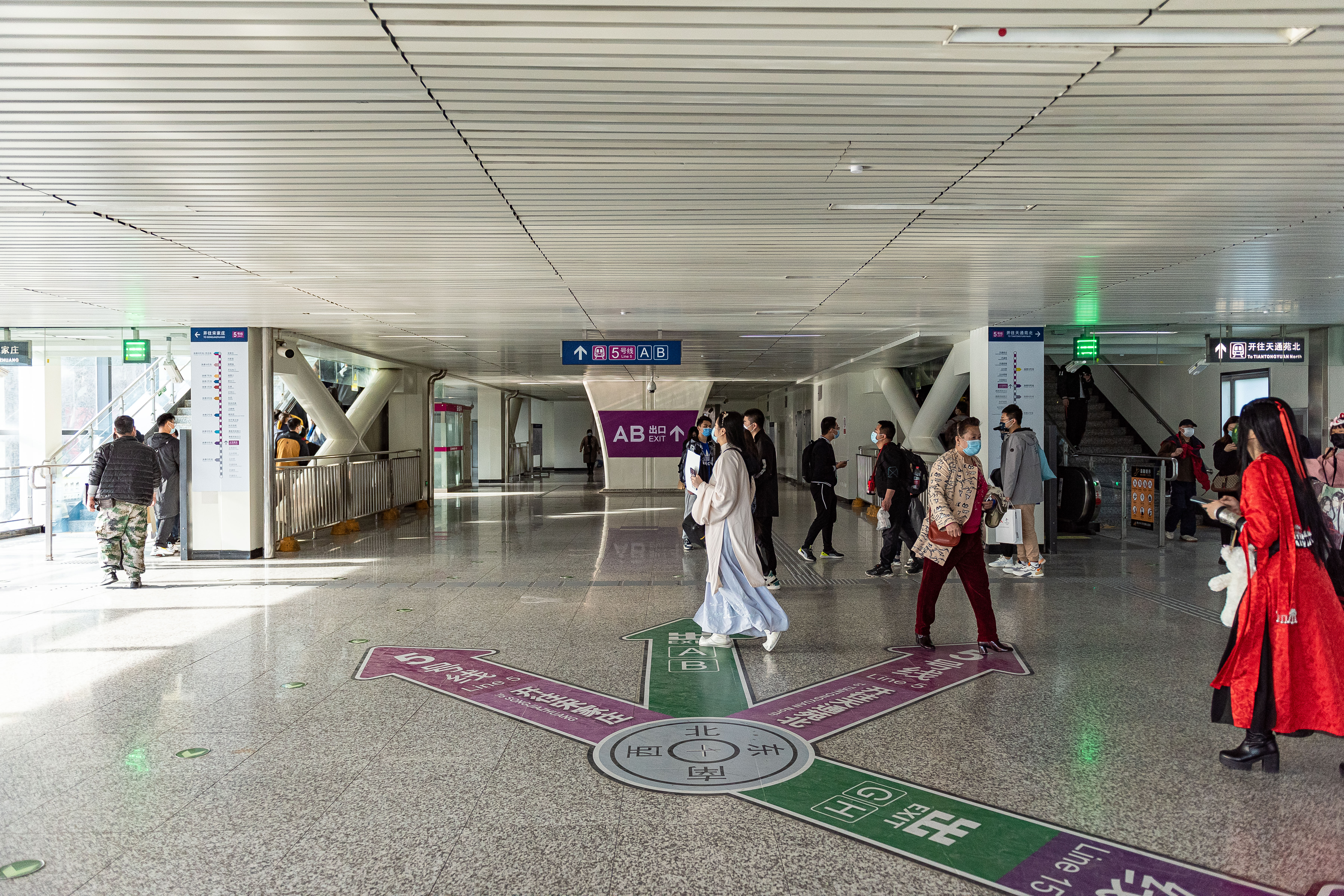
Line 5 concourse after renovation

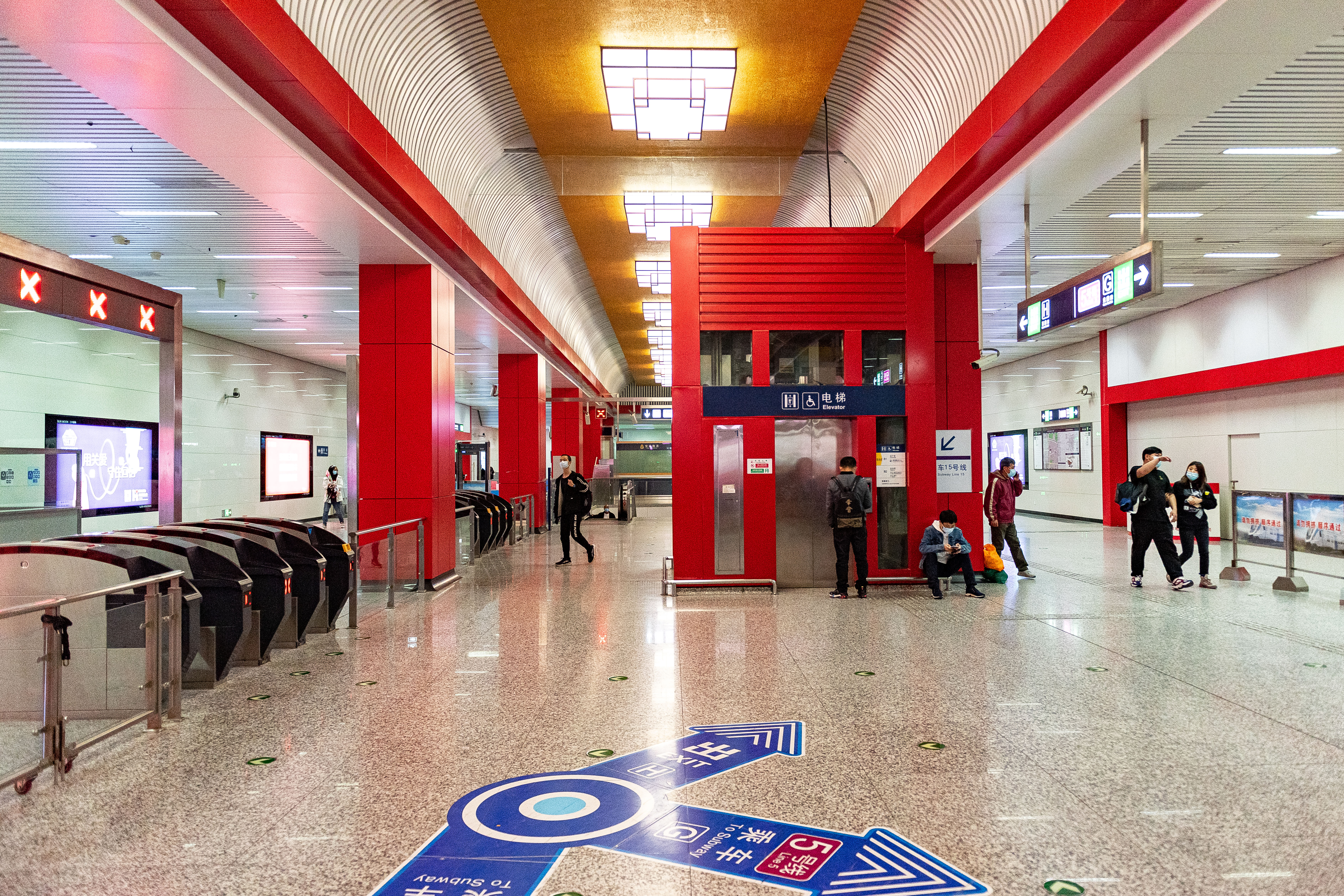
Line 15 concourse
