= Aoti Zhongxin (Olympic Sports Center) station =

Beijing Subway station

Coordinates: 39.9851°N 116.3928°E

Aoti Zhongxin (Olympic Sports Center) 奥体中心
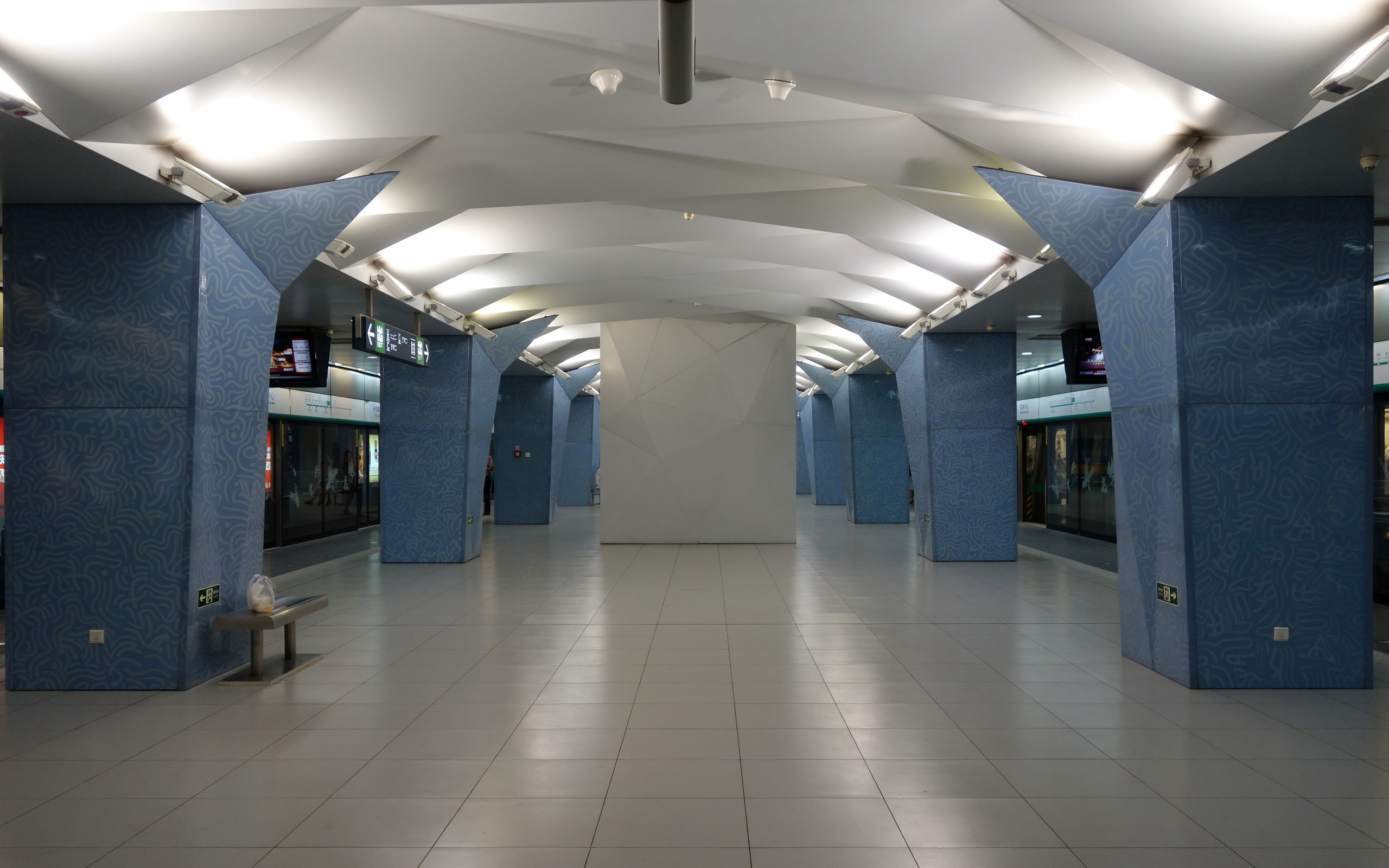
- Platform

General information
- Location: Beichen Road south of the North 4th Ring Road Middle / Beichen Bridge; Chaoyang District, Beijing; China
- Line: Line 8
- Platforms: 2 (1 island platform)
- Tracks: 2

Construction
- Structure type: Underground
- Accessible: Yes

History
- Opened: October 9, 2008

Services
Preceding station	Beijing Subway	Following station
Olympic Park towards Zhuxinzhuang	Line 8	Beitucheng towards Yinghai
Location
- Location within Beijing

Aoti Zhongxin (Olympic Sports Center) station (simplified Chinese: 奥体中心站; traditional Chinese: 奧體中心站; pinyin: Àotǐ Zhōngxīn zhàn) is a station on Line 8 of the Beijing Subway.

It is the nearest station to the National Olympic Sports Center, and is therefore decorated with sports elements.

== Station layout ==
The station has an underground island platform.

== Exits ==
There are 4 exits, lettered B1, B2, C, and D. Exit C is accessible.
