= Datun Subdistrict =

Datun Subdistrict 大屯街道
- Subdistrict
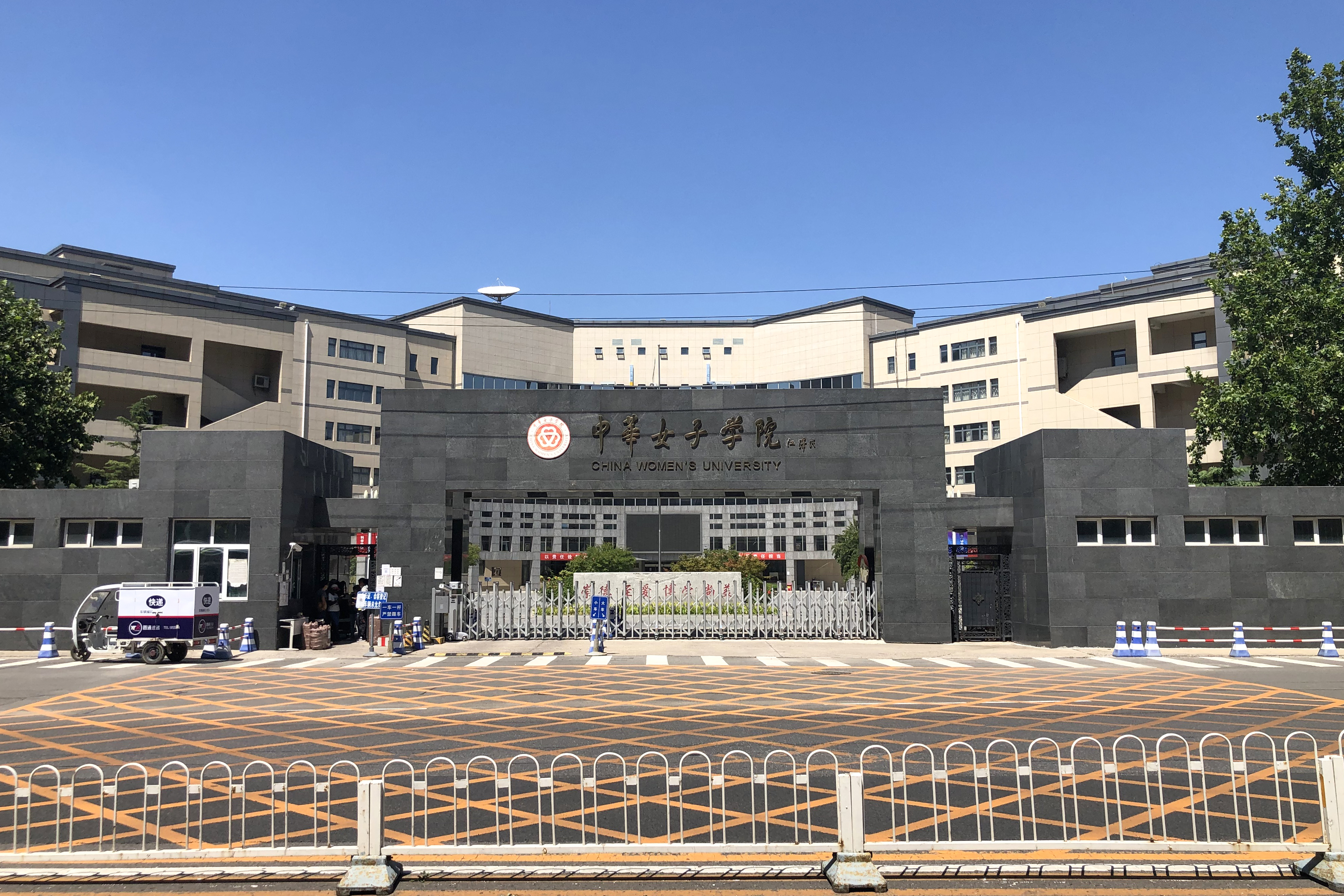
- China Women's University within the subdistrict, 2020

- Location within Beijing Location within China
- Coordinates: 40°00′02″N 116°24′25″E
- Country: China
- Municipality: Beijing
- District: Chaoyang
- Village-level Divisions: 20 communities

Area
  - Total: 10.01 km^{2} (3.86 sq mi)

Population (2020)
  - Total: 132,457
  - Density: 13,230/km^{2} (34,270/sq mi)
- Time zone: UTC+8 (China Standard)
- Postal code: 100101
- Area code: 010

Datun Subdistrict (Chinese: 大屯街道; pinyin: Dàtún Jiēdào) is a subdistrict on northwest of Chaoyang District, Beijing, China. It borders Aoyuncun Subdistrict to the north and west, Laiguangying Township and Wangjing Subdistrict to the east, Yayuncun and Xiaoguan Subdistrict to the south. As of 2020, its population was 132,457.

The name of this subdistrict was from Datun (Chinese: 大屯; lit. 'Big Station') Village, which was historically a station for crops or military personnel.

== History ==
Timeline of changes in the status of Datun Subdistrict
Time	Status
Ming and Qing dynasty	Part of Daxing County
1949	The following 9 villages were established in the area: Datun; Yuchi; Xindian; Guanzhuang; Xiaoying; Caobali; Yaowangmiao; Beiding; Gounihe
1953	The villages were combined into 4 small townships: Datun, Guanzhuang, Yaowangmiao and Beiding
1956	The small townships were merged to create Datun Township, with 8 Production team under it
1958	Transferred under Chaoyang District
1996	Contained 5 villages: Datun, Xindian, Guanzhuang, Caobali and Beiding
2005	Reorganized into Datun Subdistrict

== Administrative Division ==
As of 2021, there are a total of 20 communities within Datun Subdistrict:

Administrative Division Code	Community Name in English	Community Name in Simplified Chinese
110105025015	Datunli	大屯里
110105025029	Yayun Xinxin Jiayuan	亚运新新家园
110105025034	Huizhongli Diyi	慧忠里第一
110105025035	Huizhongli Di'er	慧忠里第二
110105025036	Huizhong Beili Diyi	慧忠北里第一
110105025037	Huizhong Beili Di'er	慧忠北里第二
110105025038	Anhui Beili Xiuya	安慧北里秀雅
110105025039	Anhui Beili Anyuan	安慧北里安园
110105025040	Yuhui Xili	育慧西里
110105025041	Yuhuili	育慧里
110105025042	Shijicun	世纪村
110105025043	Anhui Dongli	安慧东里
110105025044	Jiamingyuan	嘉铭园
110105025045	Oulu Jingdian	欧陆经典
110105025046	Jinquan Jiayuan	金泉家园
110105025047	Anhui Dongli Di'er	安慧东里第二
110105025048	Anhui Beili Yiyuan	安慧北里逸园
110105025049	Zhongcan Jiayuan	中灿家园
110105025050	Ronghua Jiayuan	融华嘉园
110105025051	Fucheng Huayuan	富成花园

== See also ==
- Anli Lu station
- Datunludong station
