= Koreans in Beijing =

Ethnic minority

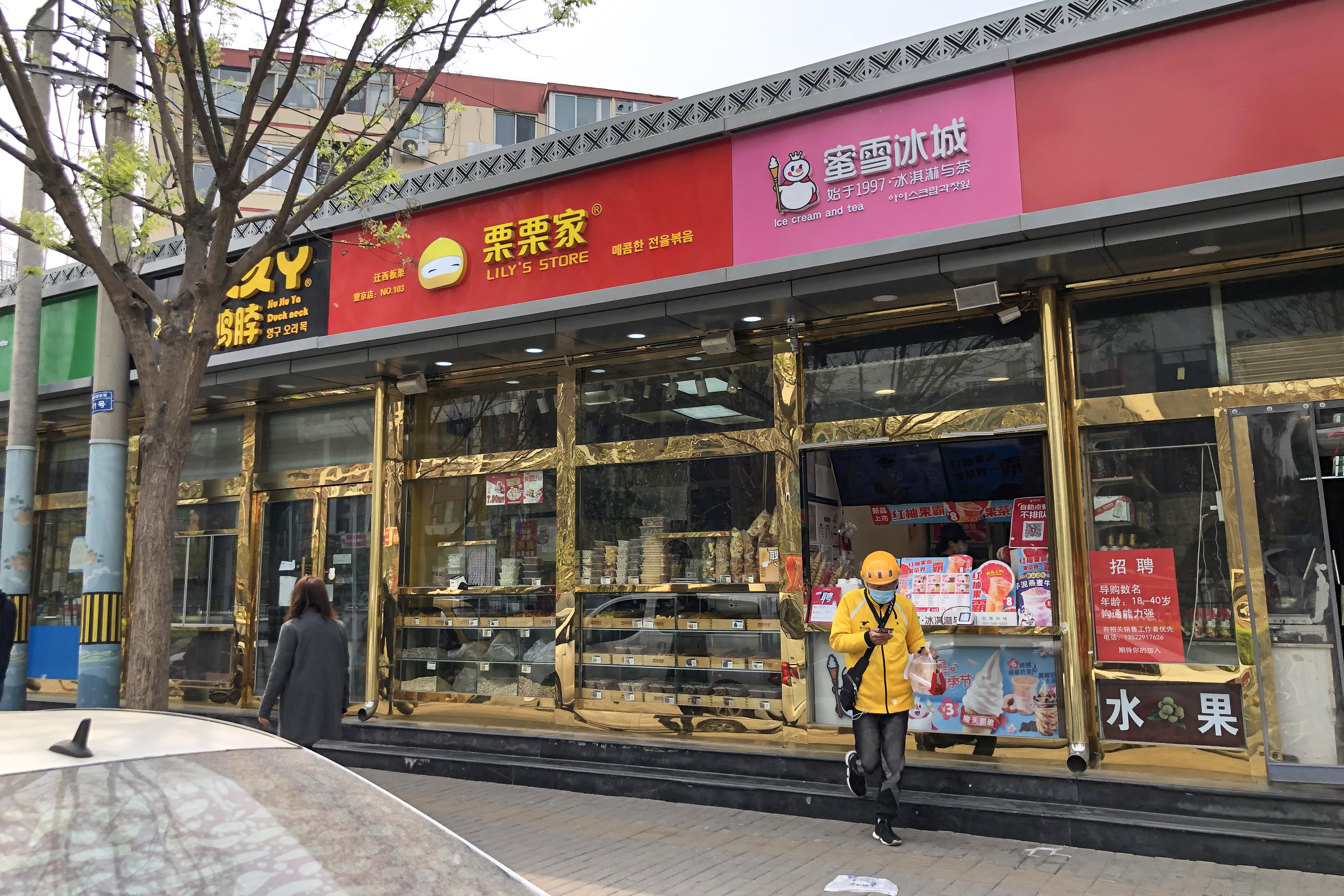
Stores near Futong station, a subway station in Wangjing, with Chinese, English and Korean trilingual signs

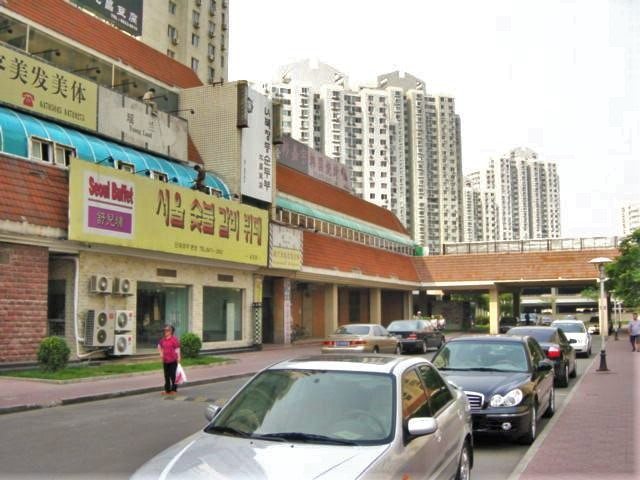
Korean shop signs in Wangjing, Beijing in 2004

Beijing has a population of Koreans. According to 2019 estimates, total number of population was 95,383 and there were about 36,660 South Korean people for business,16,783 South Korean students, and 41,940 Chaoxianzu (Joseonjok) (ethnic Koreans who are Chinese citizens) in Beijing.

== History ==
Due to war and famine in Korea that occurred beginning in the 1860s, Koreans began settling in Beijing. The Japanese established Manchukuo in Manchuria in the 1930s and established labor migrations from southern Korea to Manchuria. Ultimately this caused Koreans to settle in Beijing. The Chinese Communist Party gave Chinese citizenship to Koreans who fought for the Communists during the Chinese Civil War.

== Geography ==
As of 2010 many South Koreans moving to Beijing have settled in Wangjing in Chaoyang District. Most South Korean businesspeople and their families in Beijing live in Wangjing.

Prior to the 2000s the Wudaokou area of Haidian District was the most popular area for South Koreans. It was the oldest of the major Korean settlements. Beginning in the early 1990s South Korean students who were studying Chinese for one to two year periods so they could enter Chinese universities began congregating in Wudaokou. Hyejin Kim, author of International Ethnic Networks and Intra-Ethnic Conflict: Koreans in China, wrote that the growth of Wangjing had weakened Wudaokou as a Korean area.

The other two areas with a large concentration of Koreans are Yansha and Yayuncun. These areas have higher than average housing rental prices in Beijing and house offices of overseas companies and embassies. The Beijing government official allows foreigners to settle in those two areas.

In Wangjing and Wudaoukou there are restaurants, electronic repair shops, and information technology businesses which are owned by ethnic Koreans and cater to migrant Koreans and employees of South Korean companies.

== Education ==
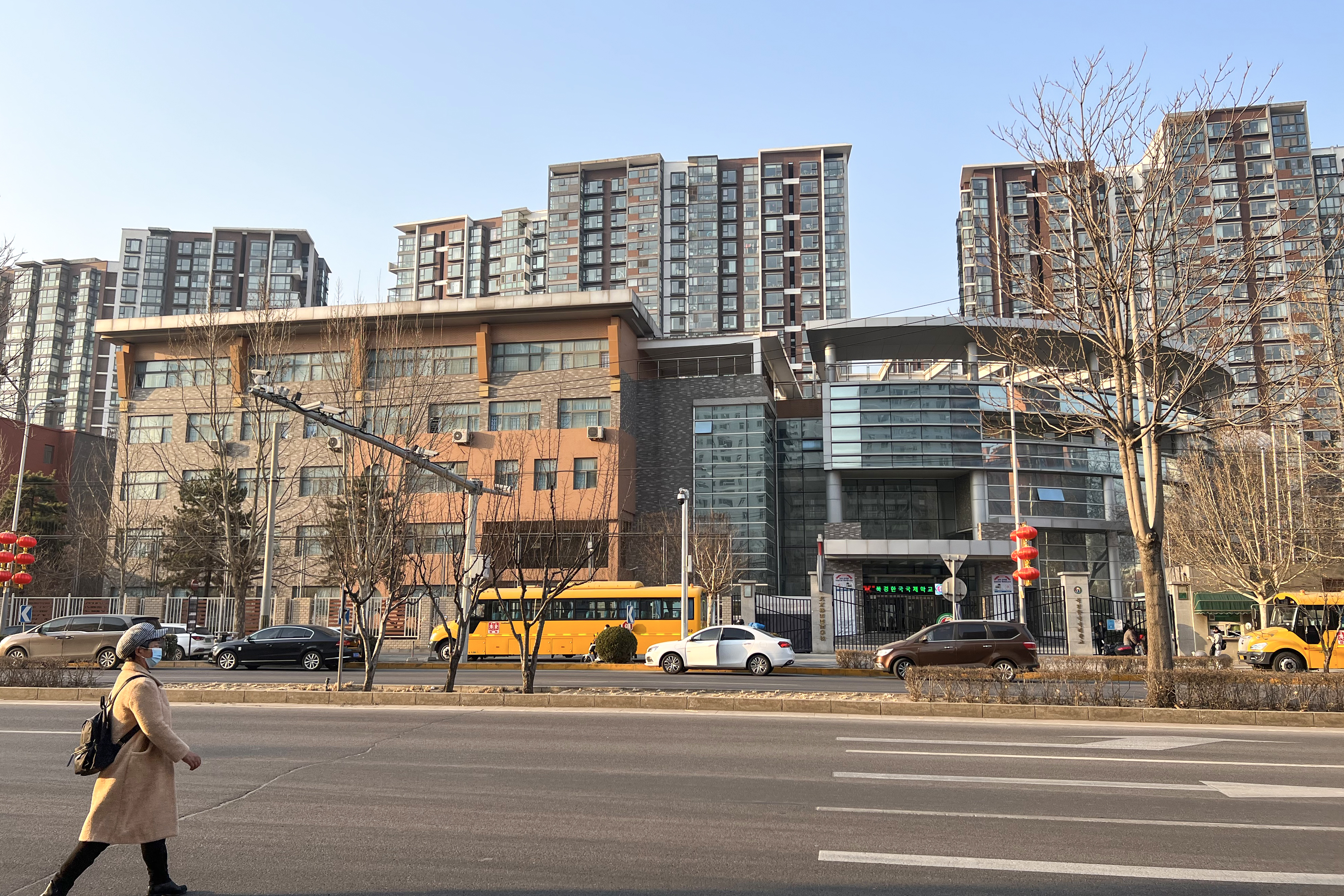
Korean International School in Beijing

As Beijing's Korean population increased, the number of Korean-Chinese schools increased. In 1989 a Beijing municipal Korean school opened. In 1993 a private Korean Chinese school opened.

The Korean International School in Beijing (KISB) is located in Wangjing.

== Culture and recreation ==
Several Korean cultural festivals are held in the city. The Beijing Korean Chinese Sports Event in 2008 attracted 100,000 Korean Chinese. Beijing has the Beijing Korean Cultural Research Center, which opened in 1996.

== See also ==
- Demographics of Beijing
- Korean community of Shanghai
- Koreans in China
- Minzu University of China
