= Koreatown, Shanghai =

Ethnic enclave in Gubei, Shanghai, China

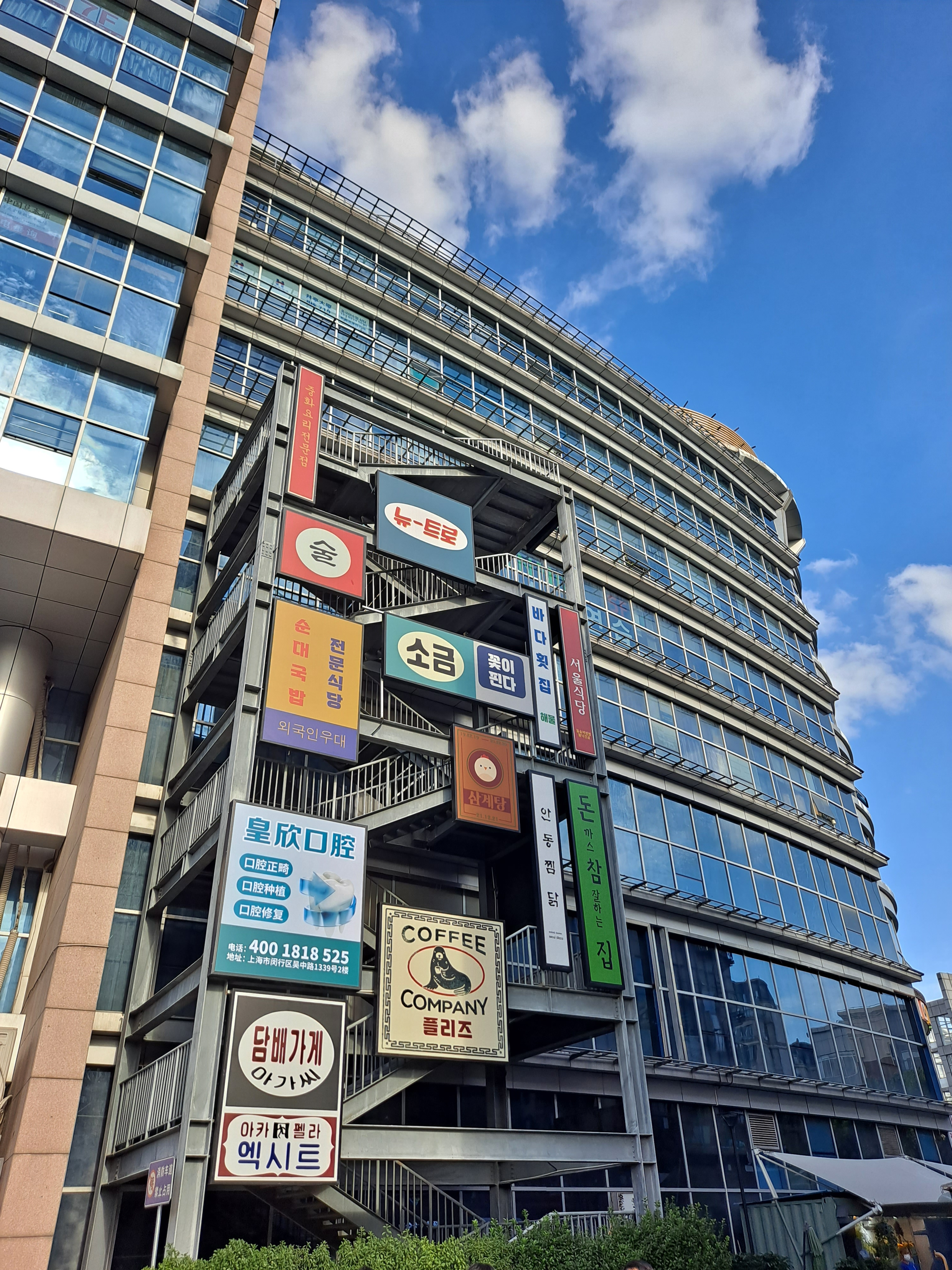
Koreatown, Shanghai

Shanghai's "Korea Town" is located in the Hongqiao(虹桥) area, particularly along Hongquan Road(虹泉路) and Jinhui nan lu(金汇南路), is known for its vibrant Korean Community and numerous Korean businesses. Over 30,000 Koreans (60% of the city's Korean population) live in the Koreatown (韩国城) of Gubei, Shanghai.

== Transportation ==
The area is accessible by Hechuan Road Station on Line 9 and Longbai Xincun Station on Line 10.

== See also ==
- Koreans in Shanghai
- Koreans in Beijing
- Koreans in China
