= KISB =

KISB may refer to:

- Kativik Ilisarniliriniq School Board
- Korean International School in Beijing
