= Wangjing Nan (S) station =

Beijing Subway station

Wangjing Nan (S) 望京南
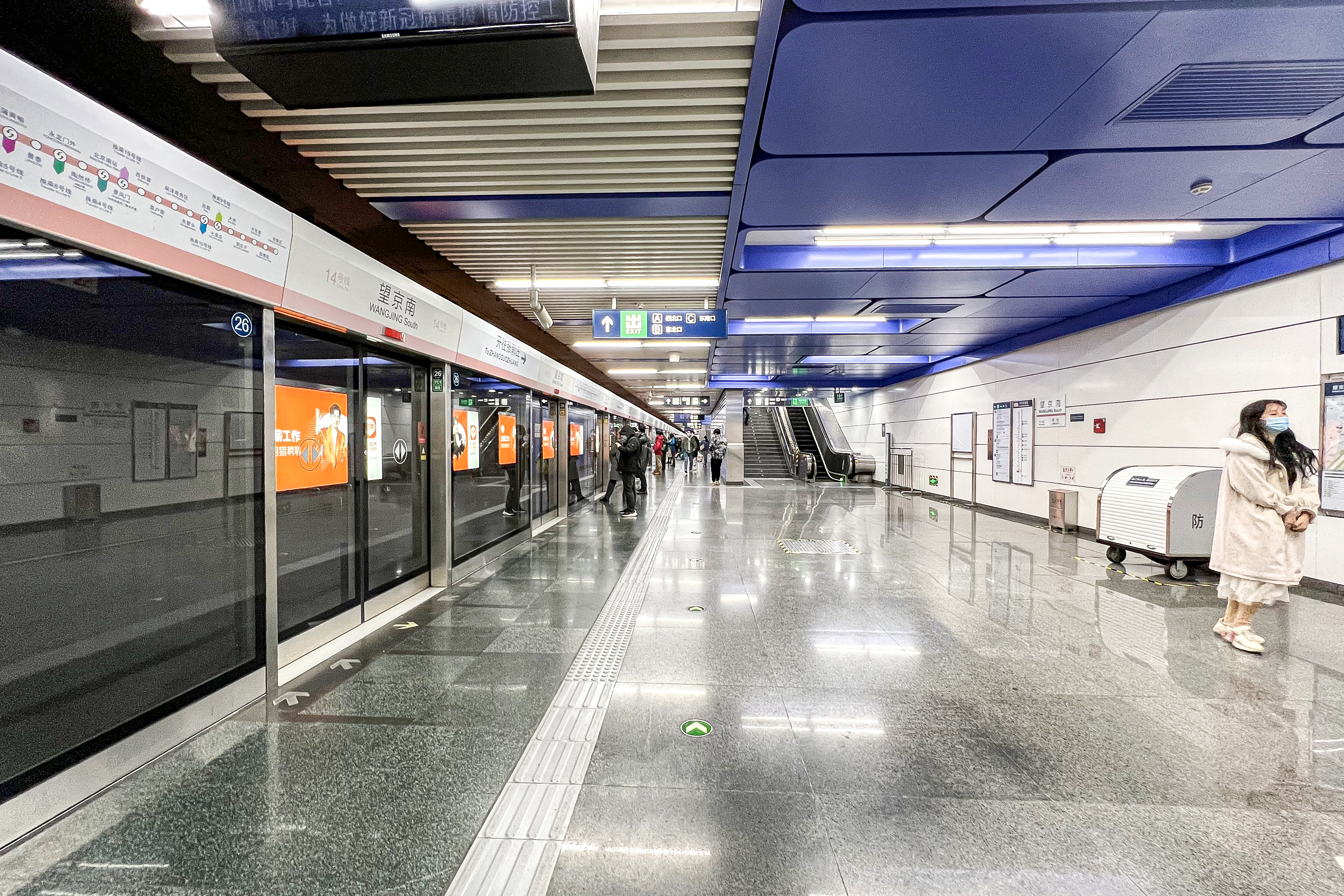
- Westbound platform

General information
- Location: Guangshun South Street (广顺南大街) / Wanhong West Street (万红西街) and G101 (Jingshun Road); Wangjing, Chaoyang District, Beijing; China
- Coordinates: 39.984543°N 116.481691°E
- Operator: Beijing MTR Corporation Limited
- Line: Line 14
- Platforms: 2 (2 side platforms)
- Tracks: 2

Construction
- Structure type: Underground
- Accessible: Yes

History
- Opened: 28 December 2014

Services
Preceding station	Beijing Subway	Following station
Jiangtai towards Zhangguozhuang	Line 14	Futong towards Shangezhuang
Location
- Location within Beijing

Wangjing Nan (S) (Chinese: 望京南站; pinyin: Wàngjīng Nán Zhàn), also known as Wangjing South, is a station on Line 14 of the Beijing Subway. It is located in the south of the Wangjing area in Chaoyang District. The station opened on 28 December 2014.

== Future development ==
The viaduct for the Capital Airport Express passes over, but does not interchange with, Line 14 at this station. Reserved space for an infill station on Capital Airport Express is under planning.

== Station layout ==
The station has 2 underground side platforms.

== Exits ==
There are 3 exits, lettered A, B1, and C. Exit C is accessible.
