= Zaoying station =

Beijing Subway station

Zaoying 枣营
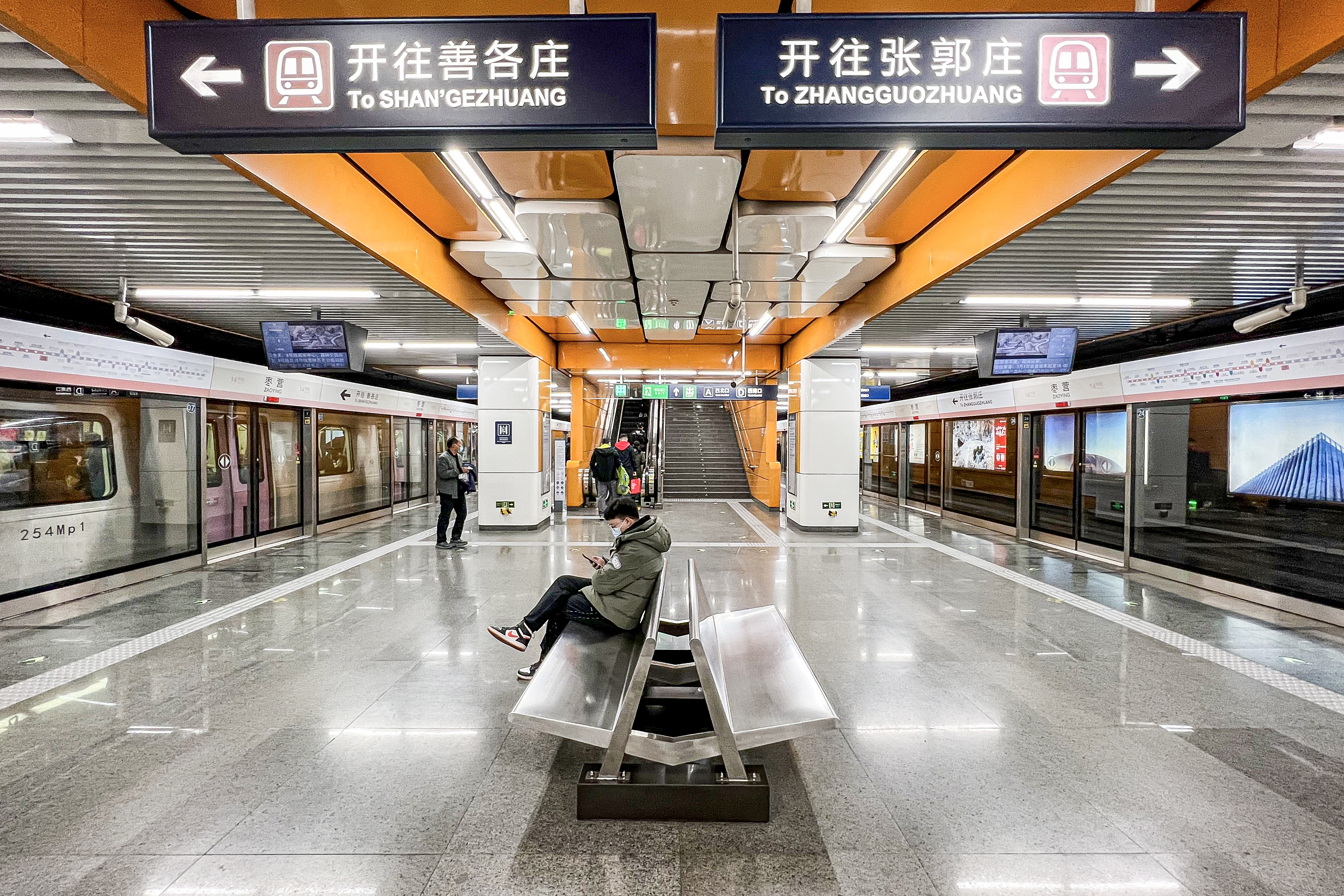
- Platform

General information
- Location: Chaoyang Park; Chaoyang District, Beijing; China
- Coordinates: 39°56′39″N 116°28′30″E
- Operator: Beijing MTR Corporation Limited
- Line: Line 14
- Platforms: 2 (1 island platform)
- Tracks: 2

Construction
- Structure type: Underground
- Accessible: Yes

History
- Opened: 28 December 2014

Services
Preceding station	Beijing Subway	Following station
Chaoyang Park towards Zhangguozhuang	Line 14	Dongfeng Beiqiao towards Shangezhuang
Location
- Location within Beijing

Zaoying (simplified Chinese: 枣营站; traditional Chinese: 棗營站; pinyin: Zǎoyíng Zhàn) is a station on Line 14 of the Beijing Subway. It is located in Chaoyang District. The station opened on 28 December 2014.

== Station layout ==
The station has an underground island platform.

== Exits ==
There are 2 exits, lettered A and D. Exit D is accessible.
