= Wangjing Science and Technology Park =

Technology center in Wangjing, Beijing, China

Coordinates: 40.01358°N 116.47509°E

Wangjing Science and Technology Park is a technology center in Wangjing, Beijing, China that houses hundreds of enterprises, primarily in telecommunications and computer science.

The park was established in 1999 in Wangjing, a residential area in the Chaoyang District in Beijing, China. In 2005, the park housed 228 enterprises. The park is very close to Beijing Capital Airport and the Olympic Village in the Chaoyang District.
