= Dongfeng Beiqiao station =

Beijing Subway station

Coordinates: 39.9576°N 116.4867°E

Dongfeng Beiqiao 东风北桥
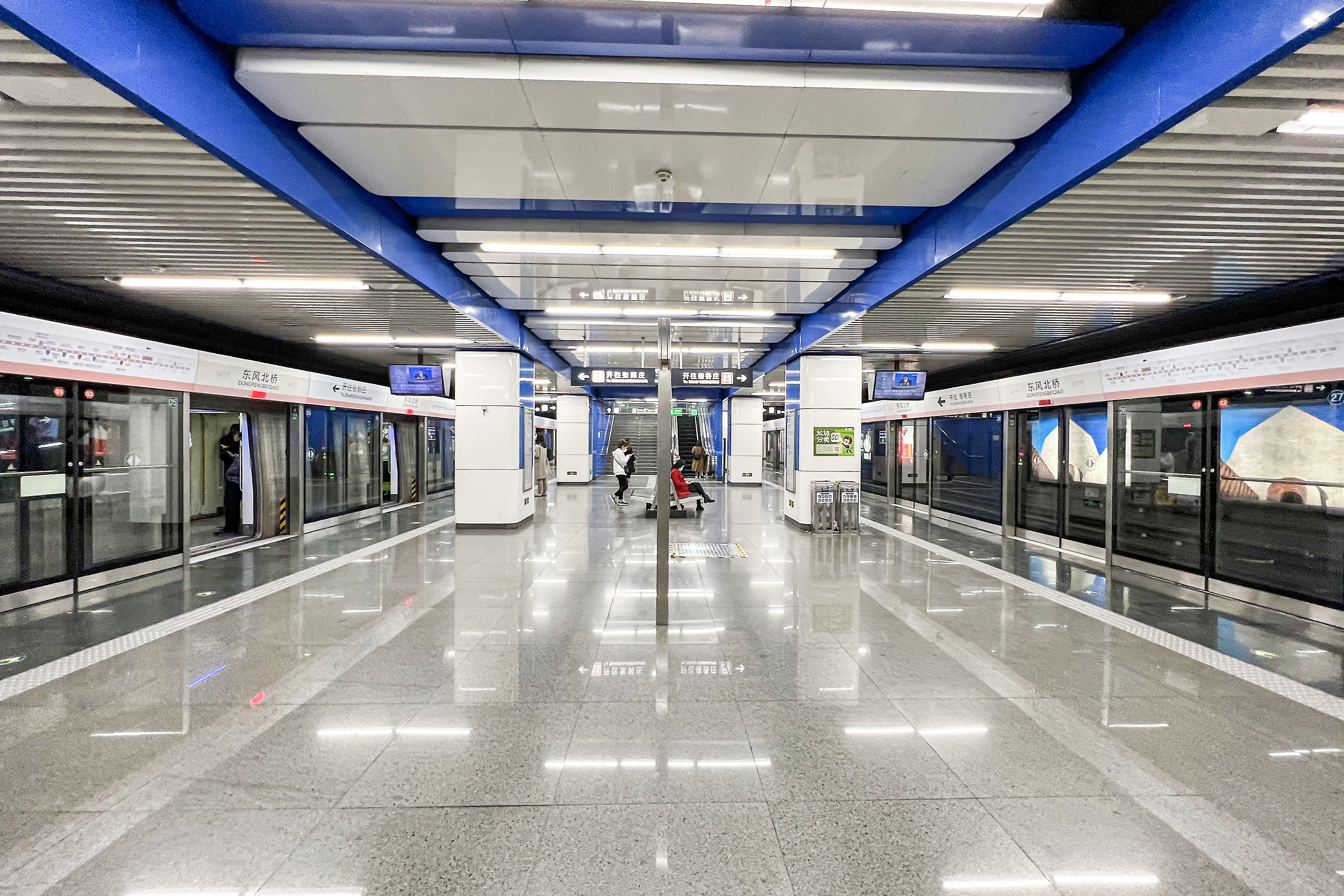
- Platform in March 2022

General information
- Location: East 4th Ring Road North at Liangmaqiao Road (亮马桥路) / South Jiuxianqiao Road (酒仙桥南路); Jiangtai, Chaoyang District, Beijing; China
- Operator: Beijing MTR Corporation Limited
- Line: Line 14
- Platforms: 2 (1 island platform)
- Tracks: 2

Construction
- Structure type: Underground
- Accessible: Yes

History
- Opened: 28 December 2014

Services
Preceding station	Beijing Subway	Following station
Zaoying towards Zhangguozhuang	Line 14	Jiangtai towards Shangezhuang
Location
- Location within Beijing

Dongfeng Beiqiao (simplified Chinese: 东风北桥站; traditional Chinese: 東風北橋站; pinyin: Dōngfēngběiqiáo Zhàn) is a station on Line 14 of the Beijing Subway. It is located just inside the East 4th Ring Road North in the Jiangtai area of Chaoyang District. The station opened on 28 December 2014.

== Station layout ==
The station has an underground island platform. It is situated on a section of a 1000-metre-radius curve.

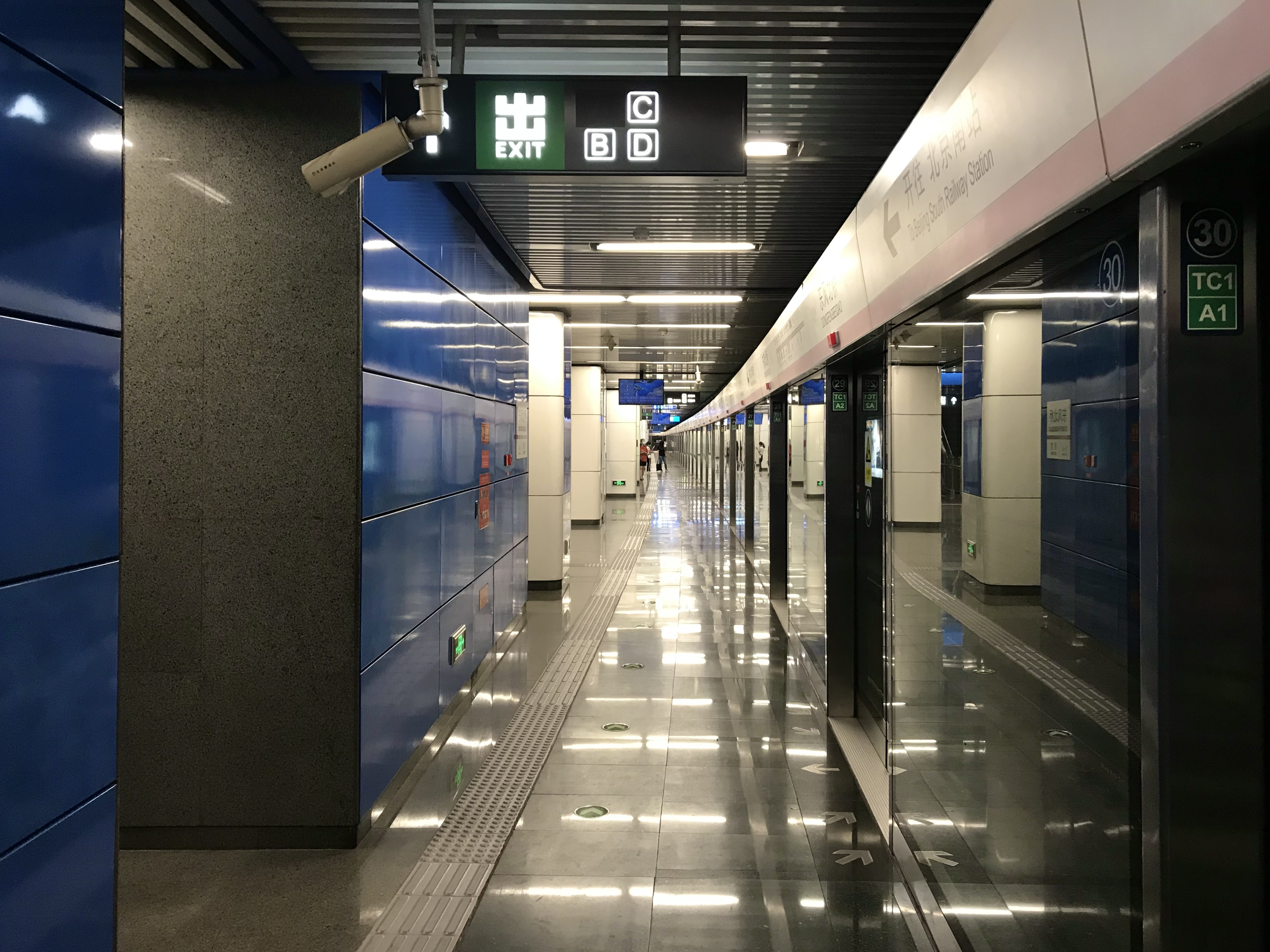

== Exits ==
There are 4 exits, lettered B, C1, C2, and D. Exit C1 is accessible.
