= Koreans in Shanghai =

As of 2019 about 56,864 (South) Koreans reside in Shanghai. According to 2019 estimates about 79,609 Chaoxianzu (Joseonjok) (ethnic Koreans who are Chinese citizens) live in Shanghai. South Koreans began moving to China after the 1992 establishment of diplomatic relations between South Korea and the People's Republic of China. Most South Koreans migrated to Shanghai due to business reasons.

Hongqiao Town in Minhang District has the largest South Korean community in Shanghai and is considered to be the Koreatown of Shanghai. The Koreatown is located near Hongquan Lu (虹泉路) and Jinhui Nan Lu (金汇南路). As of 2011, about 30,000 of the 50,000 Koreans in Shanghai live in the Koreatown area.

== History ==
In early 1919 there were 400 Koreans in Shanghai. In the autumn of 1919 this increased to 700. In that era, Shanghai became a center of Korean nationalism.

In 1982 there were 462 ethnic Koreans in Shanghai. This increased by 58.9% to 734 in 1990. According to the State Ethnic Affairs Commission, from 1990 to 1995 the ethnic Korean population in Shanghai increased by 60%.

As of 2003 there was an estimate of 7,500 long-term South Korean residents in Shanghai, with 2,676 of them having residential permits.

By 2008 almost 23,000 Koreans resided in Shanghai, making up of 15% of the foreigners and making for the second largest migrant group in Shanghai. In addition Shanghai became the center of South Korean tourism to China.

== Education ==
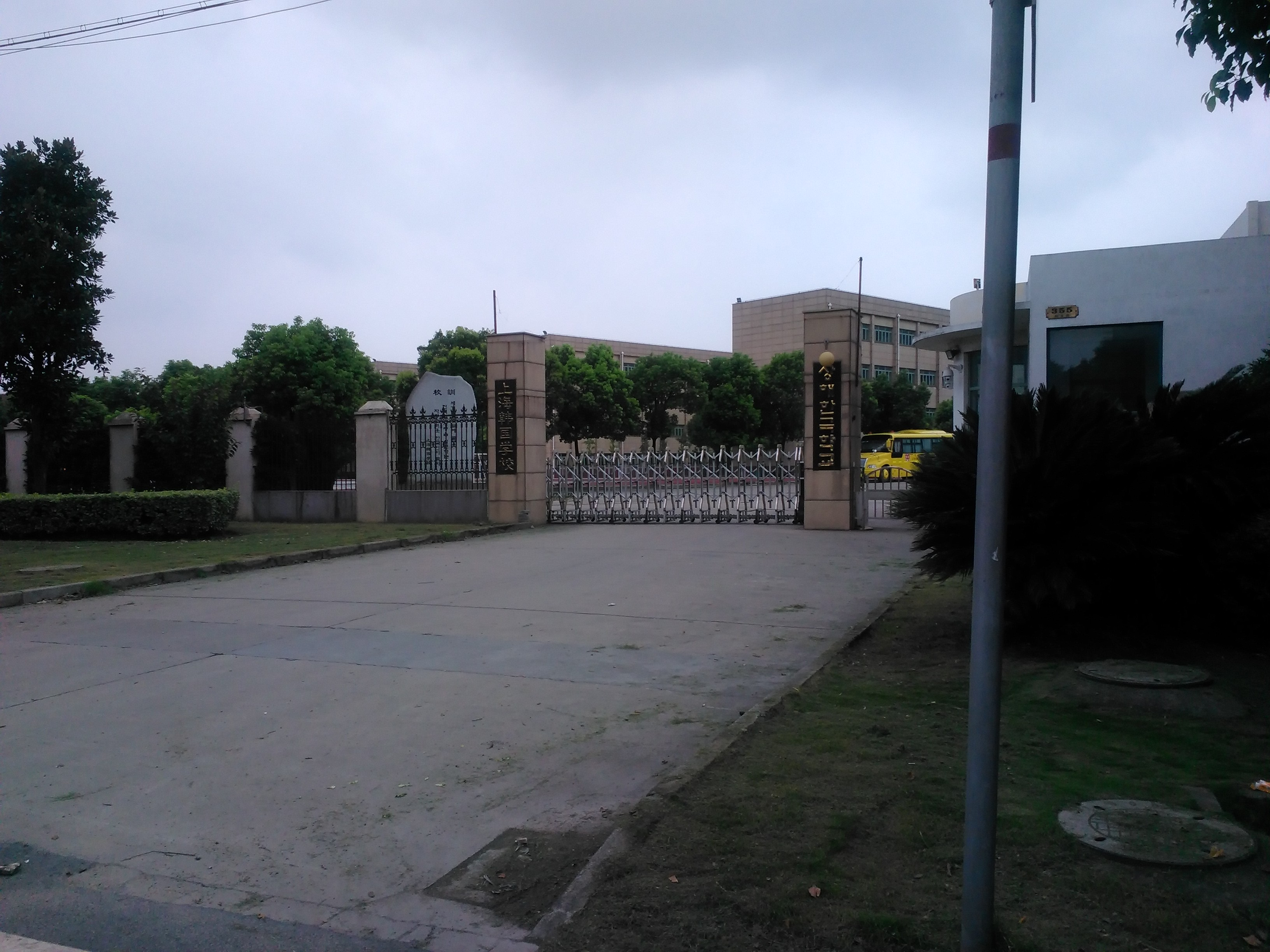
Shanghai Korean School

The Shanghai Korean School (SKS) is located in Shanghai.

== See also ==
- Japanese in Shanghai
- Koreans in Beijing
- Koreans in China
