= Wangjingdong station =

Beijing Subway station

Wangjingdong 望京东
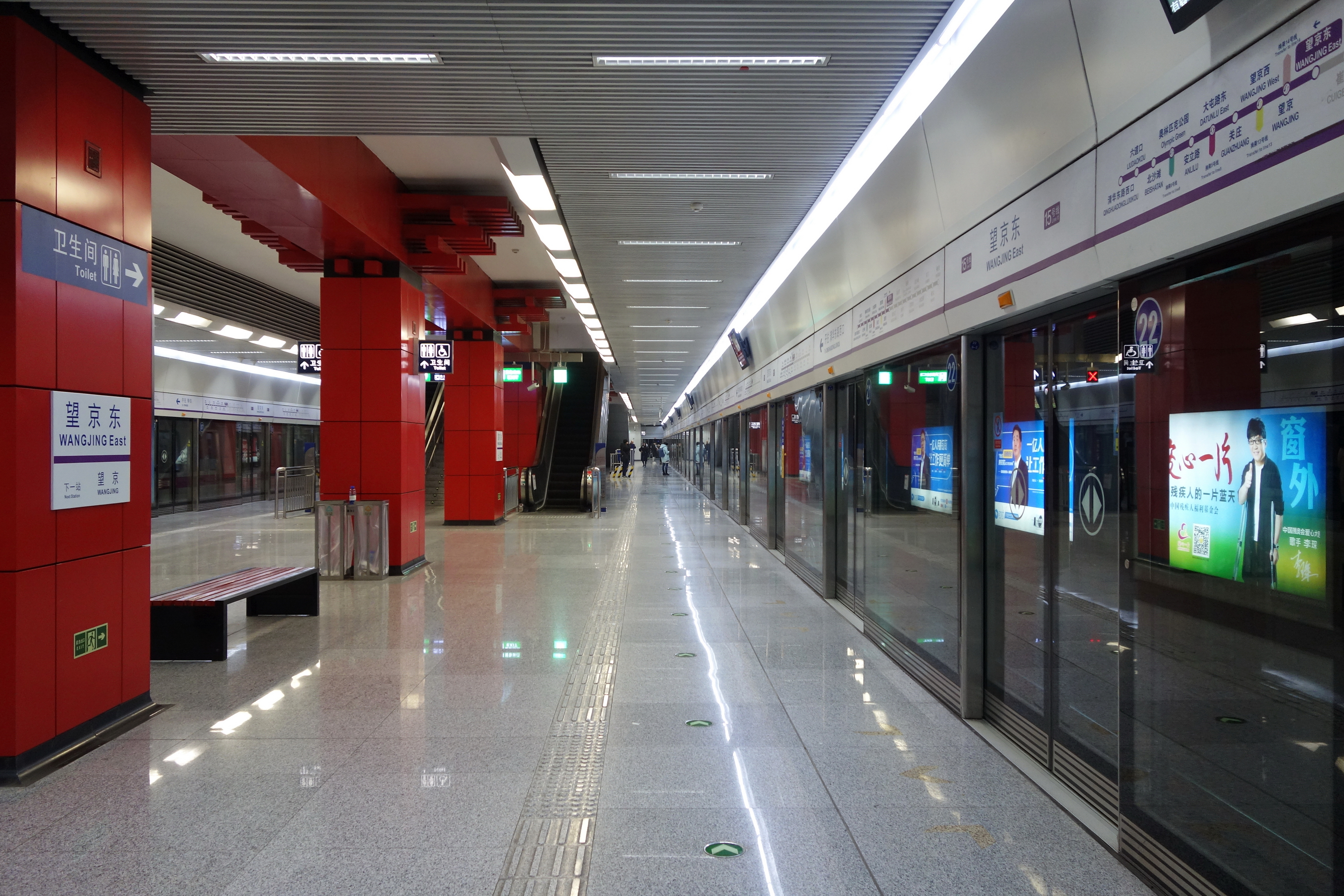
- Platform

General information
- Location: Donghu Subdistrict, Chaoyang District, Beijing; China
- Coordinates: 40°00′12″N 116°29′14″E
- Operator: Beijing Mass Transit Railway Operation Corporation Limited
- Line: Line 15
- Platforms: 2 (1 island platform)
- Tracks: 2

Construction
- Structure type: Underground
- Accessible: Yes

History
- Opened: December 31, 2016; 9 years ago

Services
Preceding station	Beijing Subway	Following station
Wangjing towards Qinghua Donglu Xikou	Line 15	Cuigezhuang towards Fengbo
Wangjing towards Qinghua Donglu Xikou	Line 15 Red service pattern	Houshayu towards Fengbo
Location
- Location within Beijing

Wangjingdong station (simplified Chinese: 望京东站; traditional Chinese: 望京東站; pinyin: Wàngjīng Dōng Zhàn) is a station on Line 15 of the Beijing Subway, situated between Wangjing and Cuigezhuang. It opened on December 31, 2016.

== Station layout ==
The station has an underground island platform.

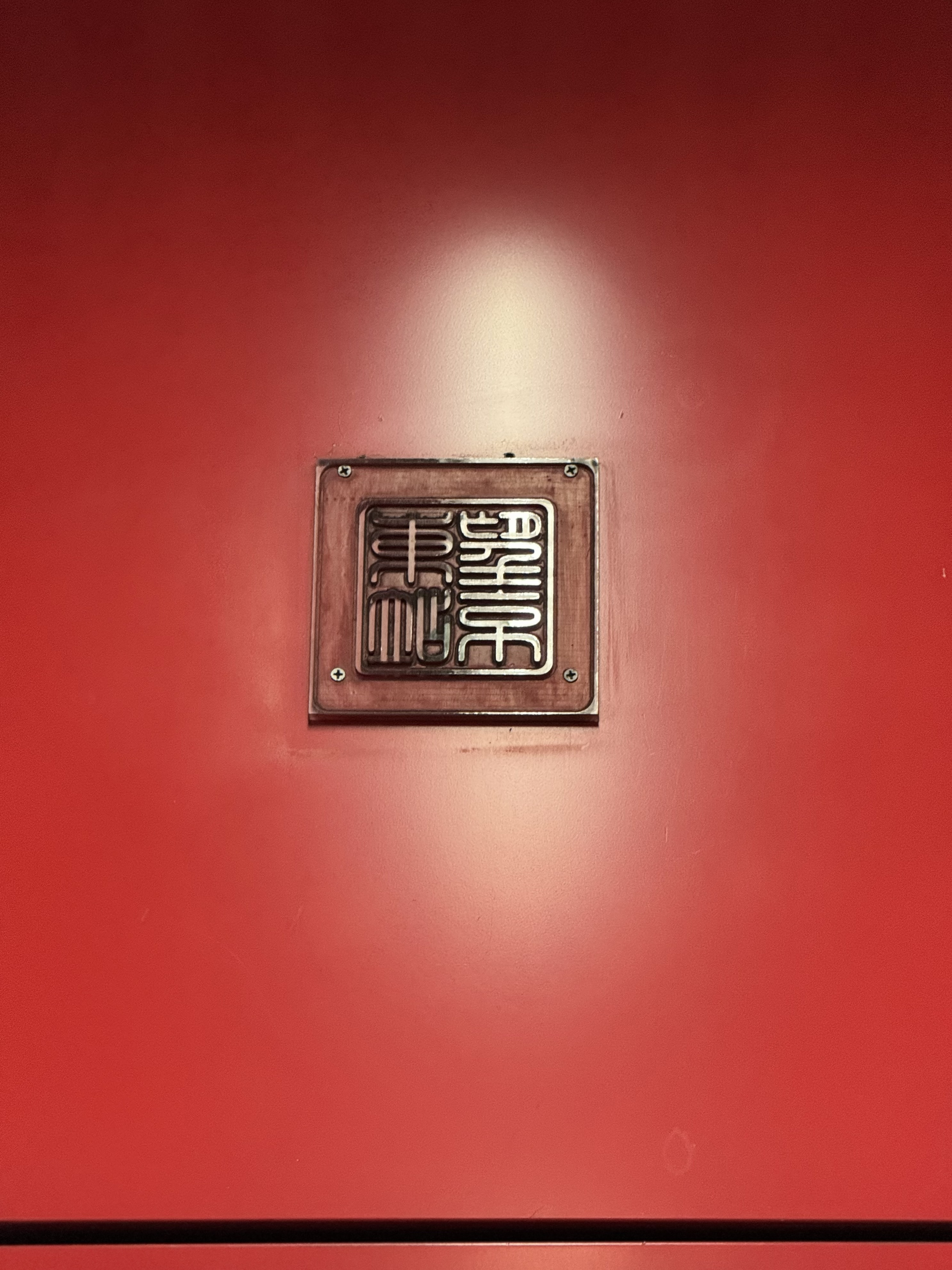
Seal Carving of the station name at the platform

== Exits ==
There are 3 exits, lettered B, C, and D. Exit B is accessible.
