= Shanghai Korean School =

International school in Shanghai, China

- 상해한국학교 上海韩国学校
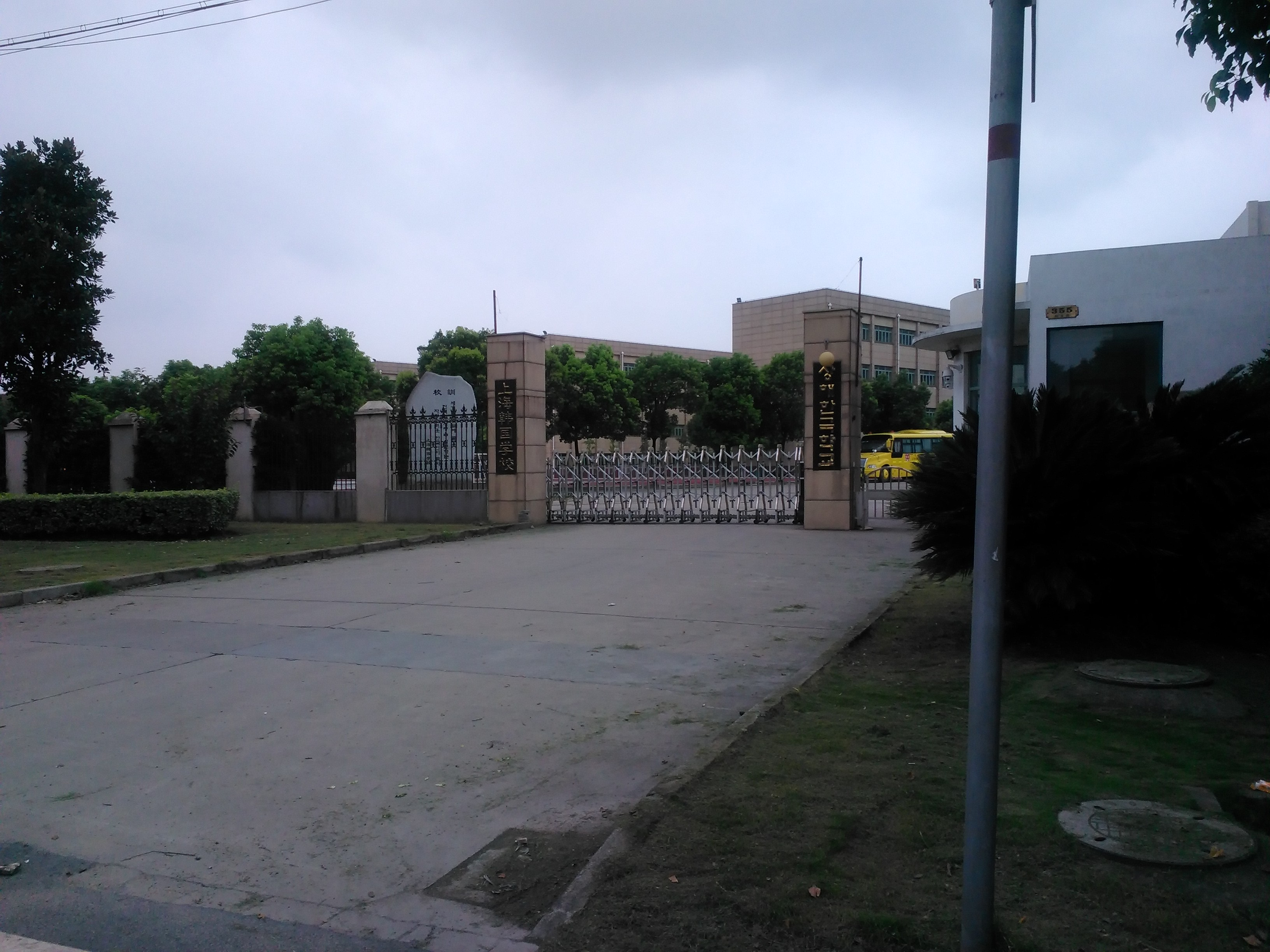

Location
- No. 355 Lianyou Road, Huacao Town, Minhang District, Shanghai 上海市 閔行區 華漕鎭 聯友路 355號 (郵)201107 上海市闵行区华漕镇联友路355号 201107
- Coordinates: 31.14856°N 121.35395700000004°E

Information
- Website: skoschool.com

Shanghai Korean School

Chinese name
- Simplified Chinese: 上海韩国学校
- Traditional Chinese: 上海韓國學校
Transcriptions
Standard Mandarin
- Hanyu Pinyin: Shànghǎi Hánguó Xuéxiào

Korean name
- Hangul: 상해한국학교

The Shanghai Korean School (SKS; Korean: 상해한국학교, Chinese: 上海韩国学校 "Shanghai South Korea School") is a South Korean international school in Huacao Town (Chinese: 华漕鎭; pinyin: Huácáo-zhèn), Minhang District, Shanghai. It serves elementary school through senior high school students.

The Chinese Ministry of Education (MOE) approved the school for teaching foreigners on October 27, 1999, and on June 2, 2006, the MOE permitted the school to establish senior high school classes.

== See also ==
- Korean community of Shanghai
- Korean International School in Beijing
