= Wangjing station =

Beijing Subway interchange station

Wangjing 望京
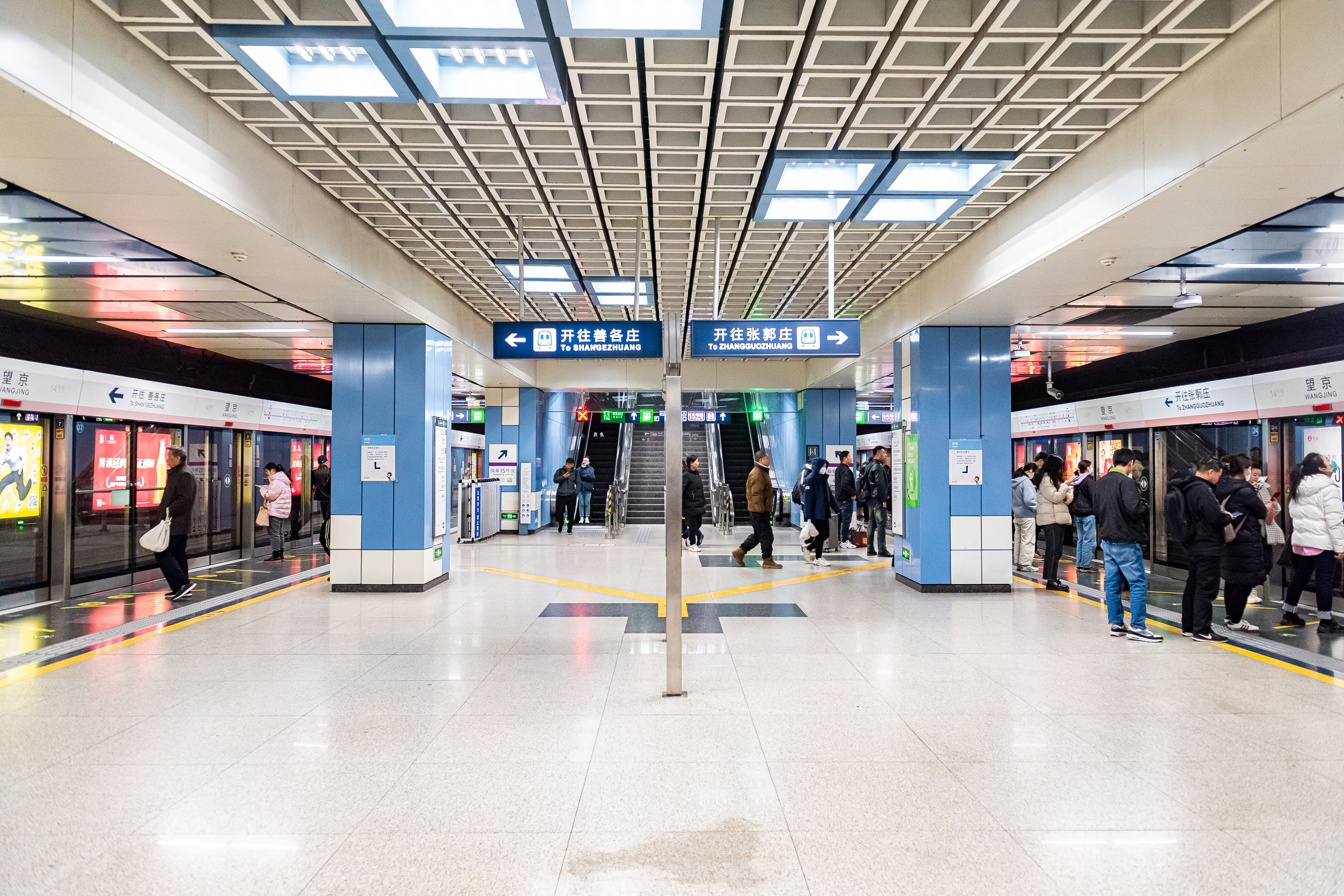
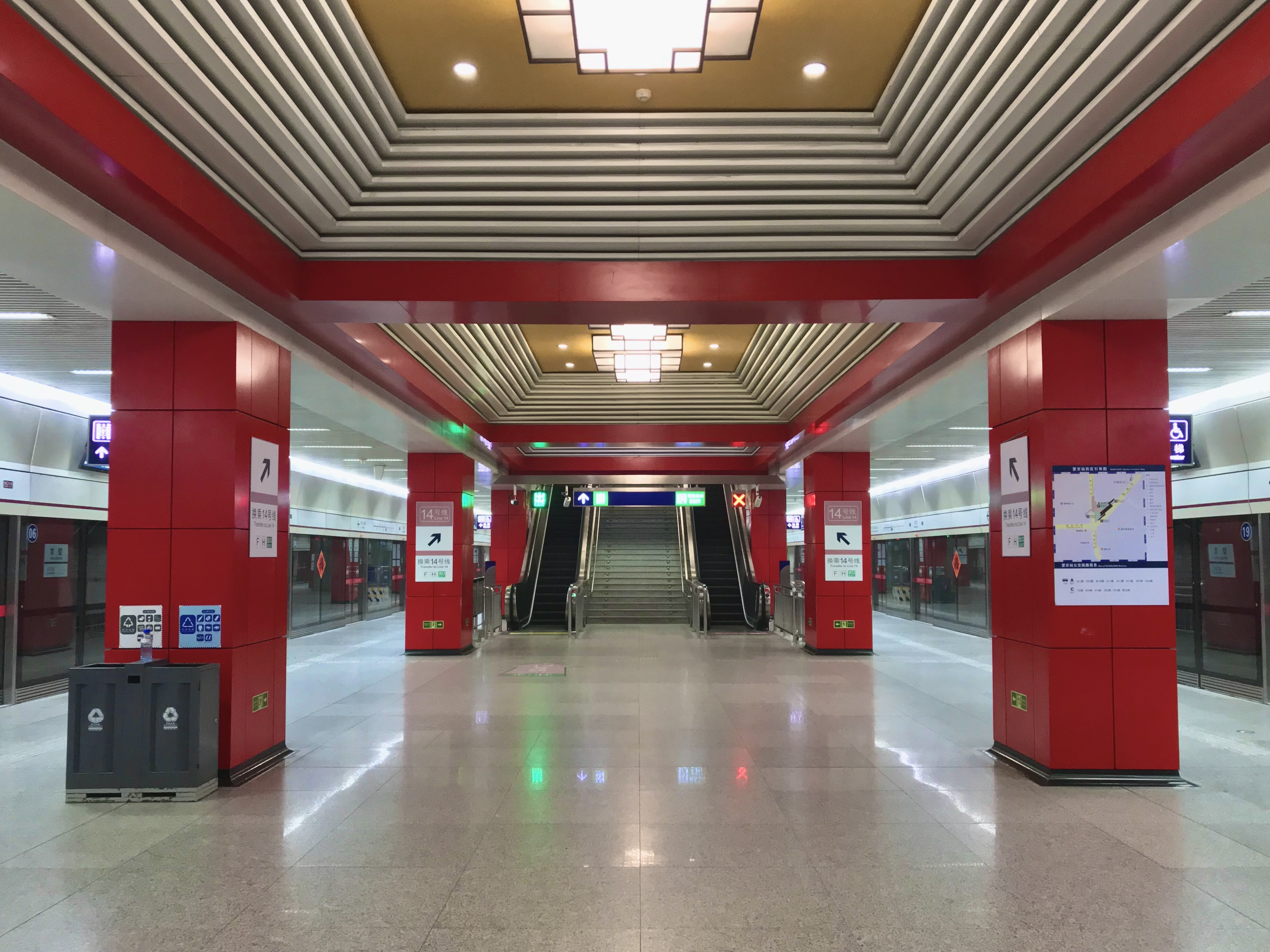
- Line 14 platform Line 15 platform

General information
- Location: Wangjing, Chaoyang District, Beijing; China
- Coordinates: 39°59′55″N 116°28′10″E
- Operator: Beijing MTR Corporation Limited (Line 14); Beijing Mass Transit Railway Operation Corporation Limited (Line 15)
- Lines: Line 14; Line 15
- Platforms: 4 (2 island platforms)
- Tracks: 4

Construction
- Structure type: Underground
- Accessible: Yes

History
- Opened: December 28, 2014; 11 years ago (Line 14); December 10, 2010; 15 years ago (Line 15)

Services
| Preceding station | Beijing Subway | Following station |
|---|---|---|
| Futong towards Zhangguozhuang | Line 14 | Donghuqu towards Shangezhuang |
| Wangjingxi towards Qinghua Donglu Xikou | Line 15 | Wangjingdong towards Fengbo |
Location
- Location within Beijing

Wangjing Station (Chinese: 望京站; pinyin: Wàngjīng Zhàn) is an interchange station between Line 14 and Line 15 of the Beijing Subway. It is located in the Wangjing subdistrict of Chaoyang, a residential area.

== Station layout ==
Both the line 14 and line 15 stations have underground island platforms.

== Exits ==
There are 4 exits, lettered A, C, F, and H. Exits A and F are accessible.

== Gallery ==
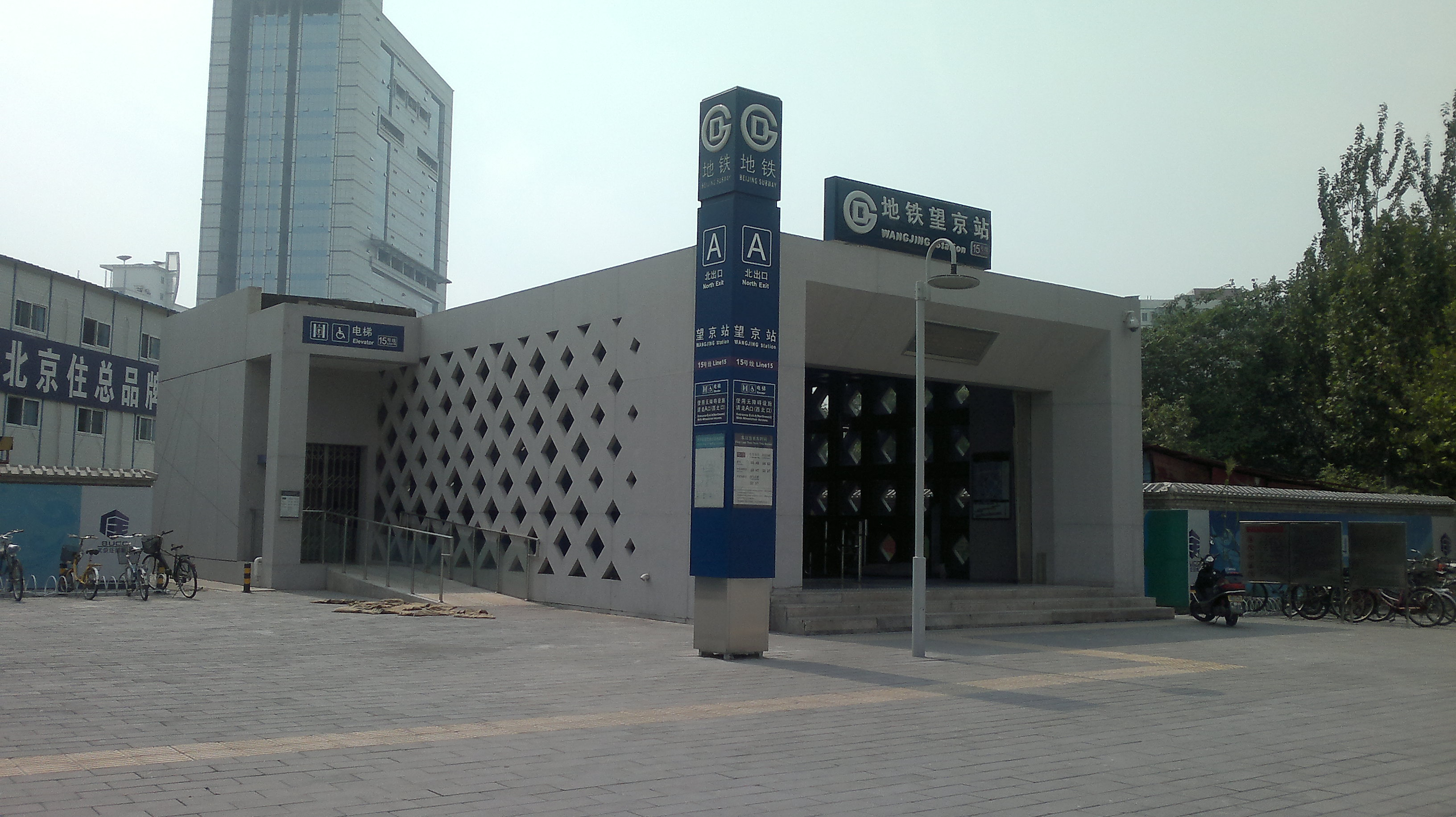
The entrance

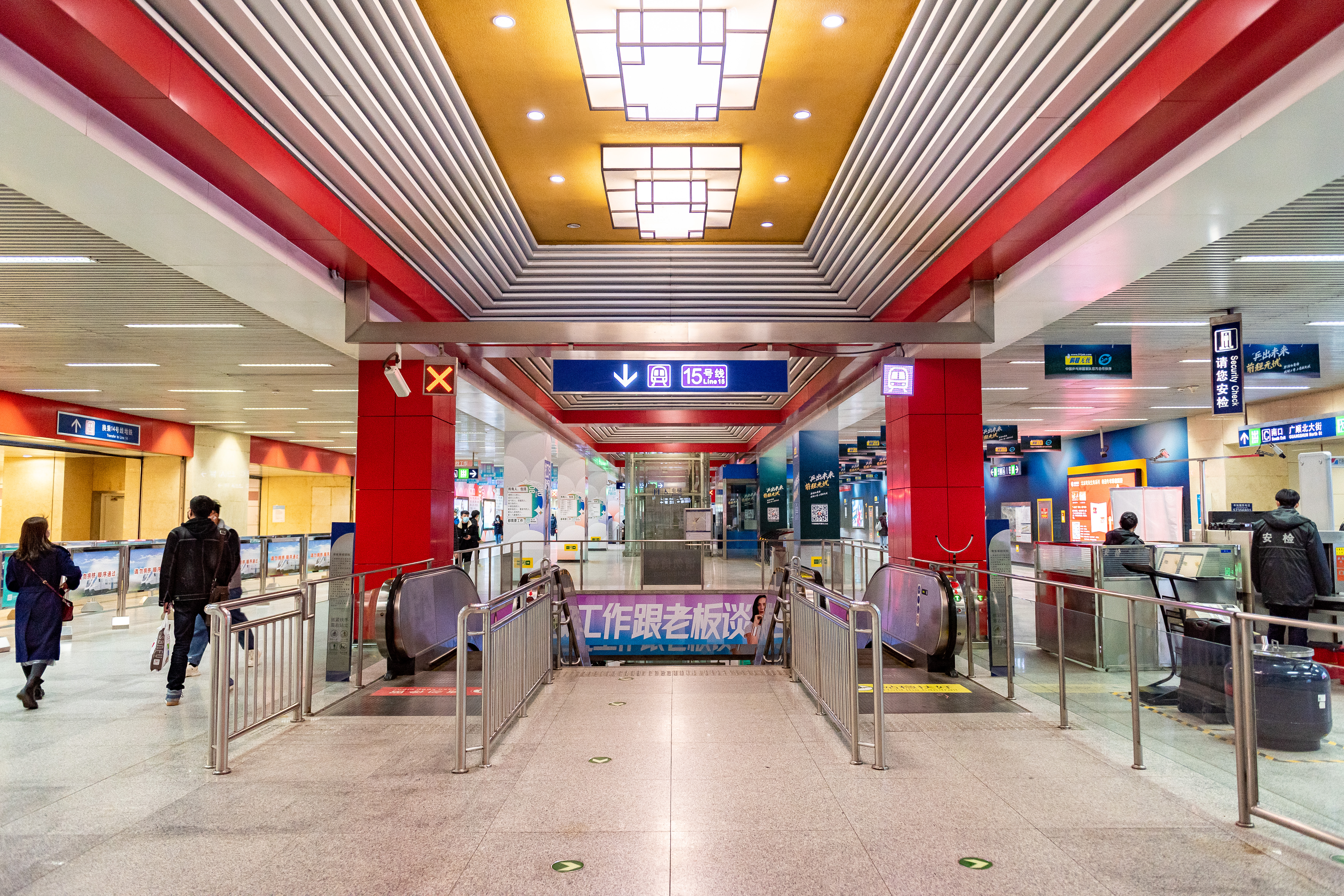
Line 15 concourse

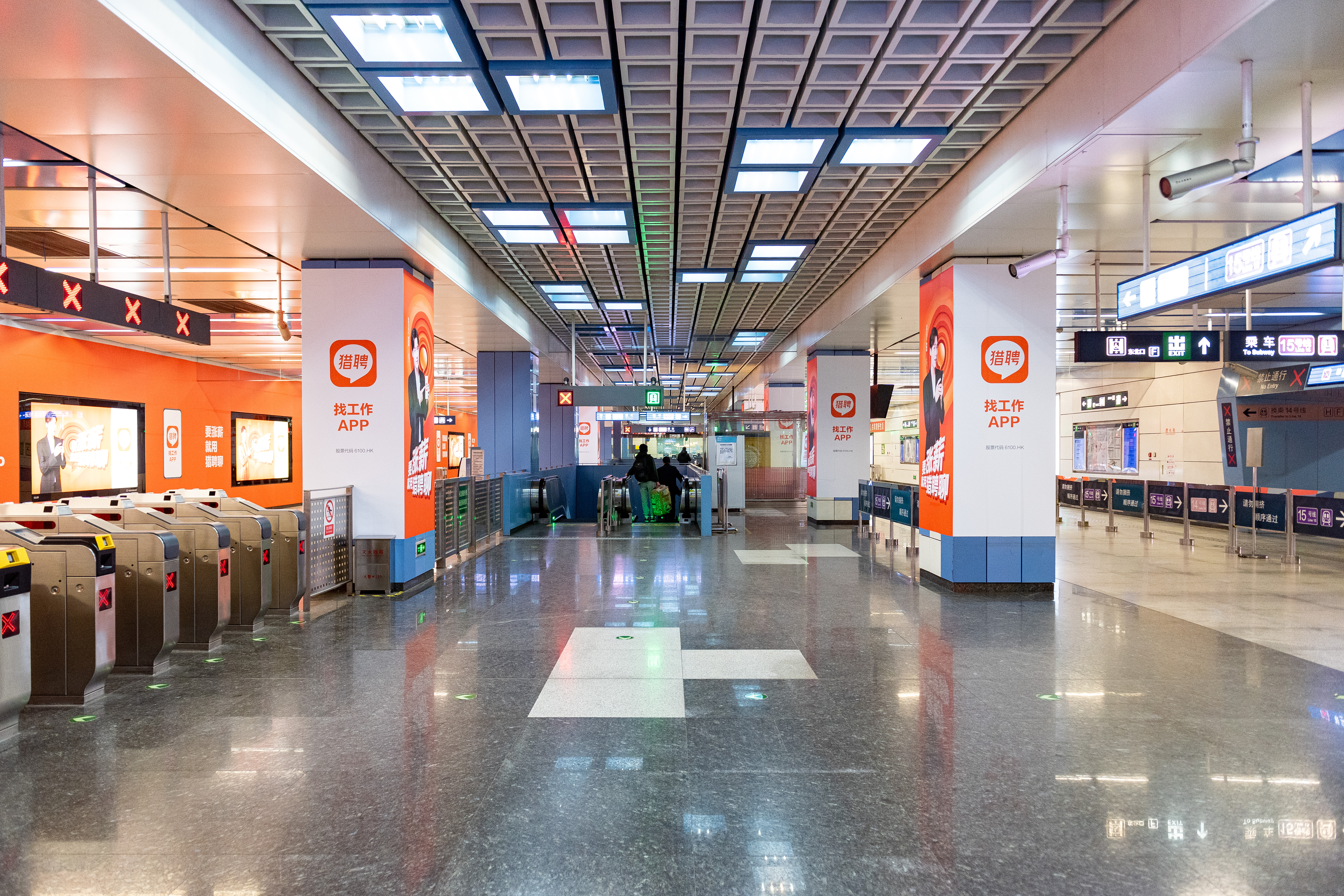
Line 14 concourse
