= Jiangtai station =

Beijing Subway station

Jiangtai 将台
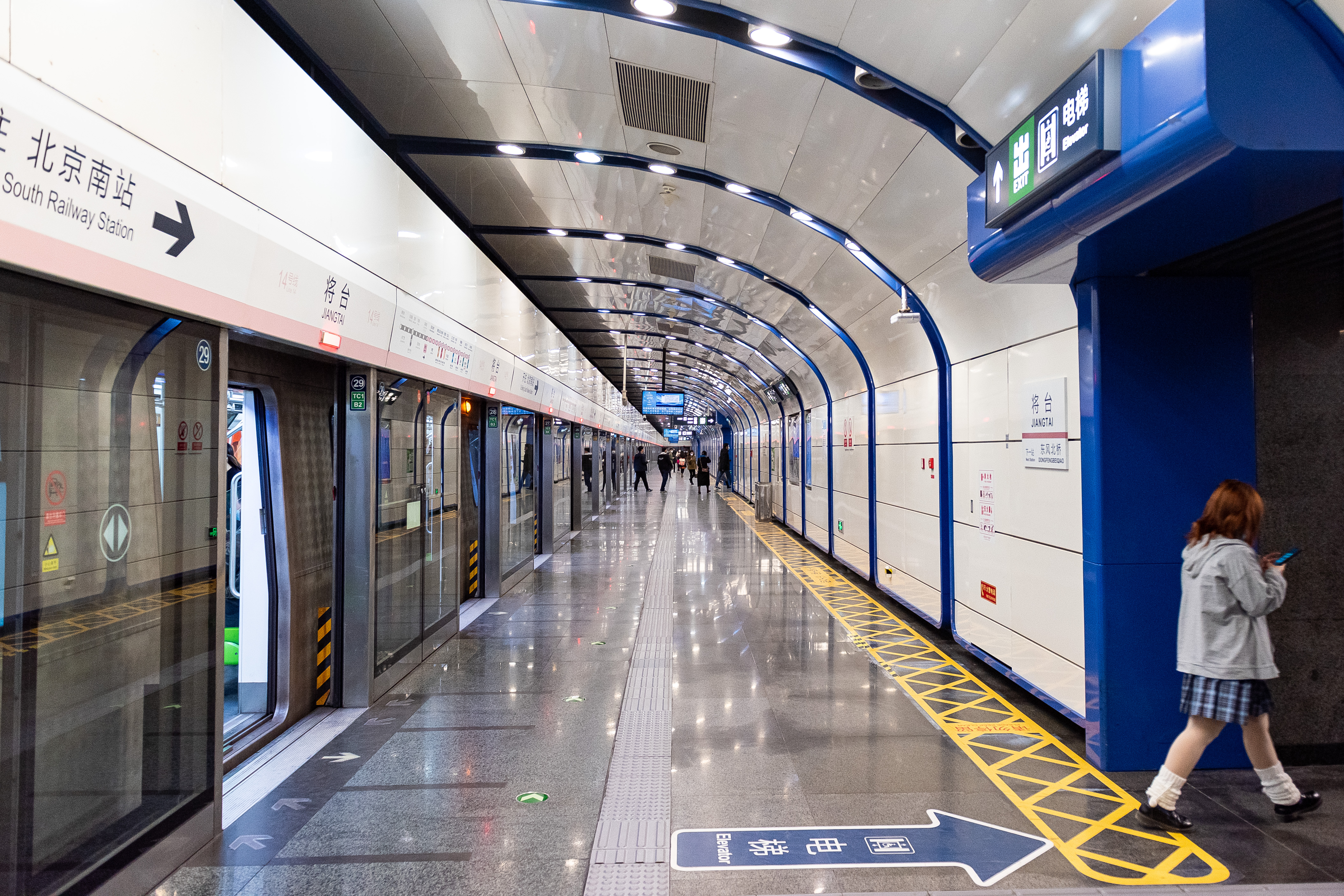
- Westbound platform

General information
- Location: Jiuxianqiao Road (酒仙桥路); Jiangtai, Chaoyang District, Beijing; China
- Coordinates: 39.9713°N 116.4899°E
- Operator: Beijing MTR Corporation Limited
- Line: Line 14
- Platforms: 2 (2 side platforms)
- Tracks: 2

Construction
- Structure type: Underground
- Accessible: Yes

History
- Opened: 28 December 2014

Services
Preceding station	Beijing Subway	Following station
Dongfeng Beiqiao towards Zhangguozhuang	Line 14	Wangjingnan towards Shangezhuang
Location
- Location within Beijing

Jiangtai station (simplified Chinese: 将台站; traditional Chinese: 將台站; pinyin: Jiàngtái zhàn) is a station on Line 14 of the Beijing Subway. The station opened on 28 December 2014.

== Location ==
It is located in Chaoyang District, outside and northeast of the 4th Ring Road, near the junction of Jiangtai Road and Jiuxianqiao Road.

== Station layout ==
The station has 2 underground side platforms.

== Exits ==
There are three exits, lettered A, B, and C. Exit B is accessible. INDIGO, Beijing is accessible from exit C.
