= Wangjing (Beijing) =

Wangjing Subdistrict 望京街道
- Subdistrict
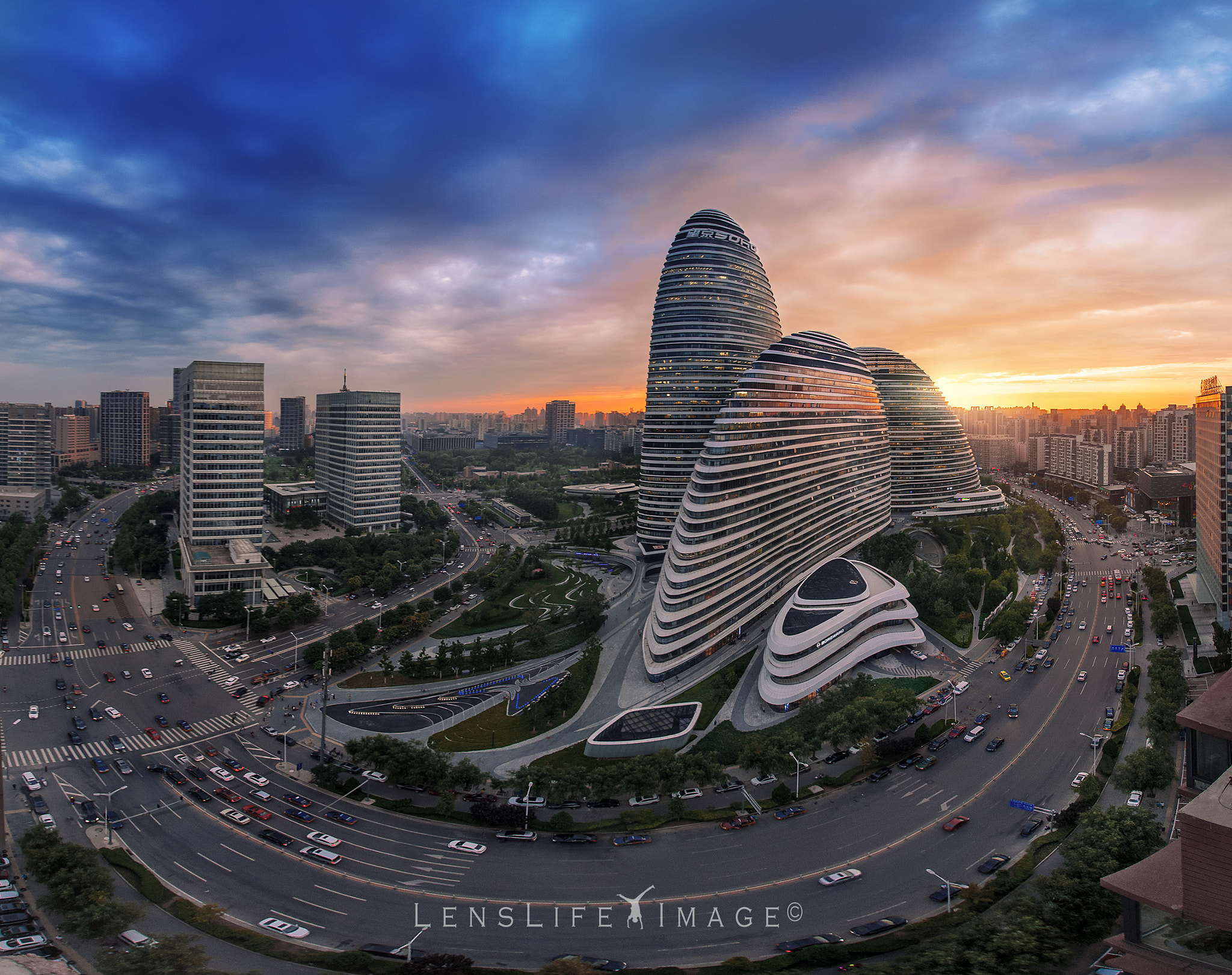
- Wangjing SOHO, 2016

- Location within Beijing Location within China
- Country: China
- Municipality: Beijing
- District: Chaoyang
- Village-level Divisions: 25 communities

Area
  - Total: 10.35 km^{2} (4.00 sq mi)

Population (2020)
  - Total: 146,220
  - Density: 14,130/km^{2} (36,590/sq mi)
- Time zone: UTC+8 (China Standard)
- Postal code: 100102
- Area code: 010

Wangjing subdistrict (Chinese: 望京街道; pinyin: Wàngjīng Jiēdào) is a subdistrict office in Chaoyang district, Beijing. It borders Donghu Subdistrict to the north, Laiguangying Area and Datun Subdistrict to the west, Jiangtai area and Jiuxianqiao Subdistrict to the east, and Taiyanggong area to the south.

Wangjing is a self-contained and multifunctional urban area that was newly developed in the northeast of central Beijing. It is under the jurisdiction of the Chaoyang District of Beijing, and in 2020 it has a population of 146,220. In recent years, Wangjing is developing into a residential area with a diverse population, an area of new companies, and an area that gathers corporate headquarter. TOP500 companies, international businesses, as well as scientific research industries are building their offices in Wangjing.

== History ==
=== Origin of the name ===
Wangjing has been the name for the area for at least nearly a thousand years of history. There are many provenances of how Wangjing was named that can be found in classical books and folklore.

One common resource is that Shen Kuo (1031–1095 AD), a scientist during the Northern Song dynasty, mentioned Wangjing in his book Dream Pool Essays. He depicts that "there is a Wangjing Dun in the northeast of Beijing City."

Another widely agreed reference is that the Qing emperor Qianlong passed through Wangjing and saw the Dongzhihmen when he looked in the direction of the Beijing City. Qianlong was very happy and named this location Wangjing, which means looking out to Beijing City. As the result, two villages in this area accepted the name Dawangjing Village and Xiaowangjing Village.

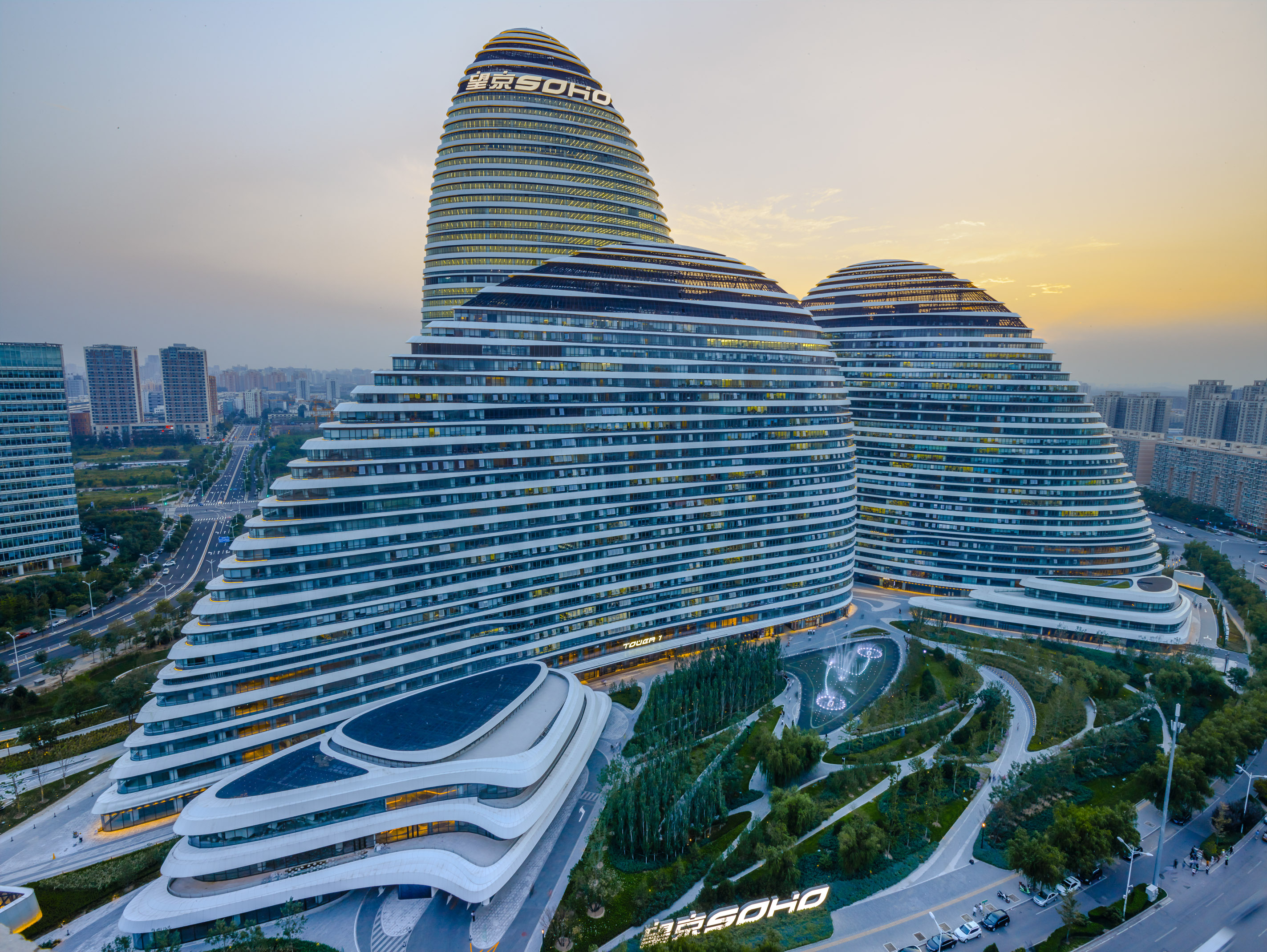
Wangjing SOHO

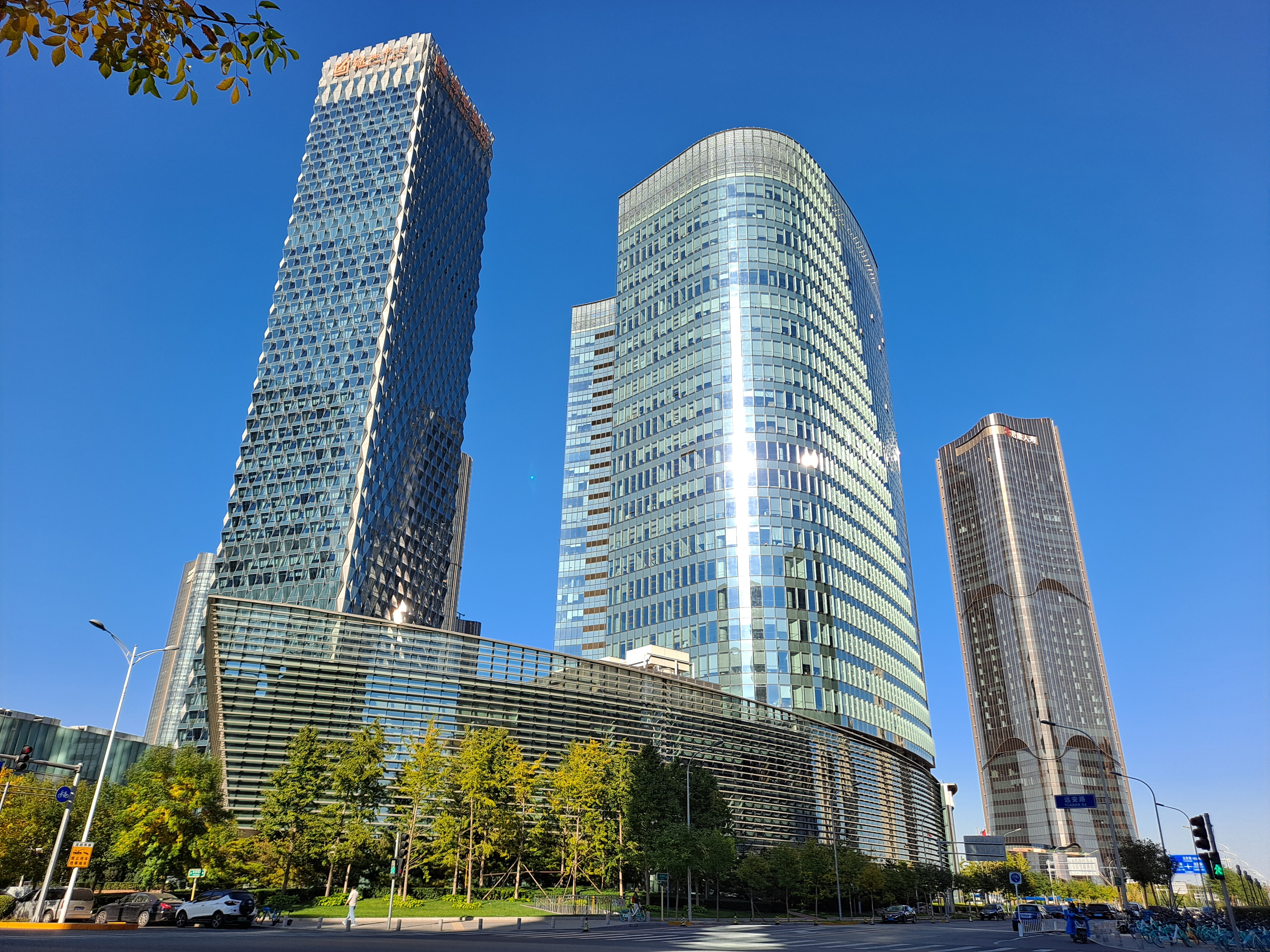
POSCO Center in Wangjing

=== Development ===
Since the mid-1980s, most of the villages clusters on the west side of the Dawangjing Village and Xiaowangjing Village, such as Nanhu, Donghu, Houzhuang, and Xibanfang, have been transformed into residential areas such as the Huajiadi neighborhood and Wangjing New Town neighborhood. These residential areas established the spatial pattern of today's Wangjing. In 1997, the developer invited 200 Koreans to live in the Wangjing New Town neighborhood when the first phase of Wangjing New Town was ready to move in.

In 2000, the Small Wangjing Village, located in the core of the planned area, began to transform into high-end office buildings, shopping malls, and residential buildings. In 2004, some of the TOP500 companies (Motorola, Nortel Networks, and Siemens) announced to set up headquarters in Wangjing. In 2007 and 2008, the 123-meter-high Siemens Building and the 140-meter-high Fangheng International Center were completed successively, setting a new height record for the buildings in Wangjing.

In April 2009, the Dawangjing Village officially launched the old village reconstruction project. In December 2009, the Detailed Regulatory Planning of the Dawangjing Business District was approved by Beijing Municipal Government. In 2011, the Dawangjing Business District was listed as one of the ten key development bases of Chaoyang District during the 12th Five-Year Plan period. Then it was named Dawangjing Science and Technology Business Innovation Zone.

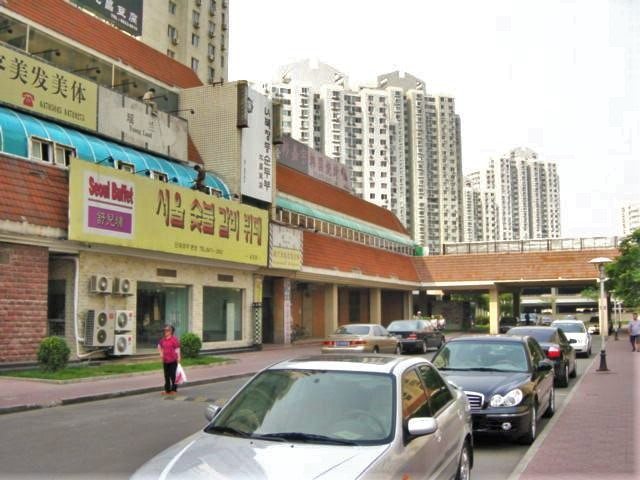
Korean shops in Wangjing, Beijing

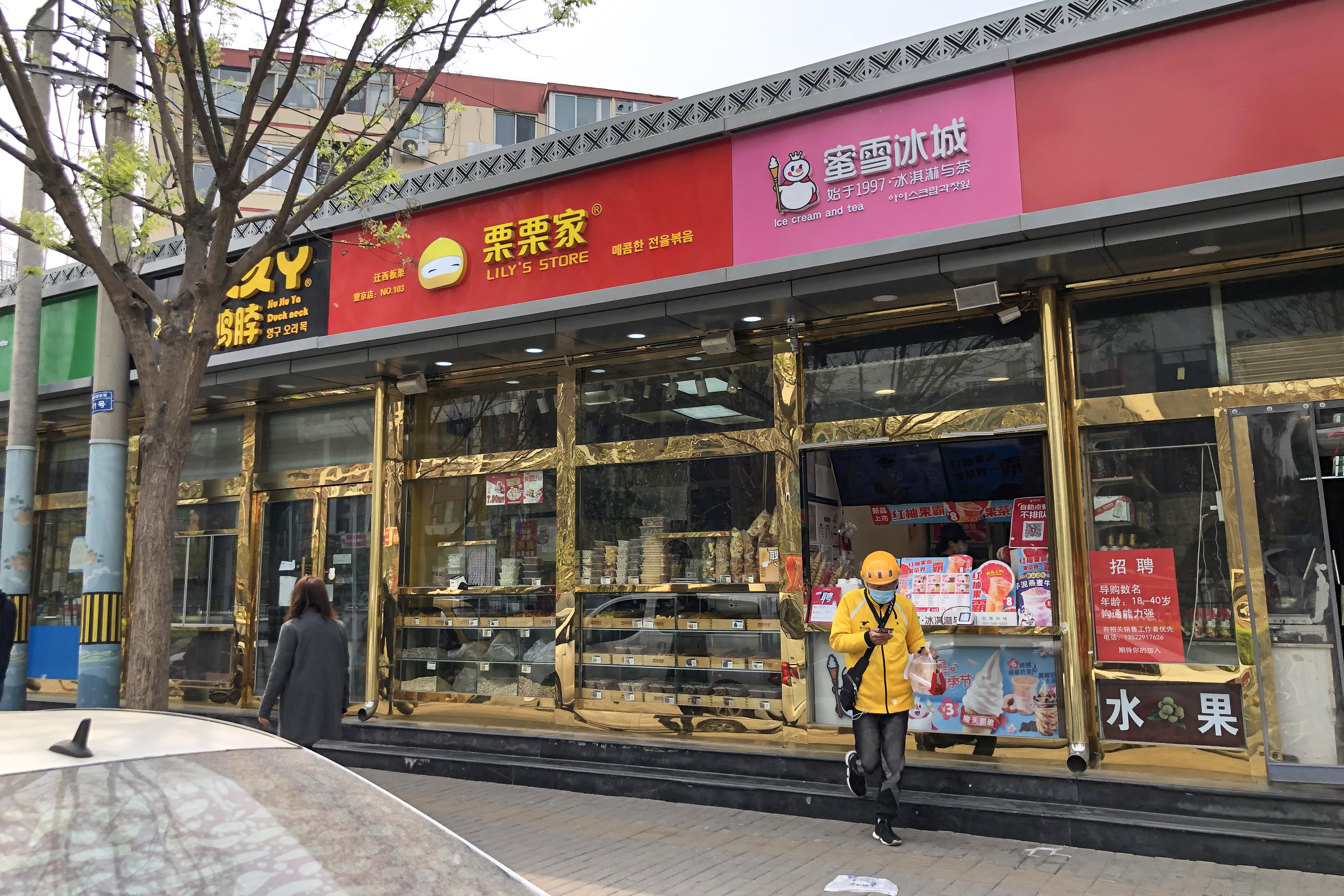
A shop sign in Wangjing includes three languages which are Chinese, English, and Korean

=== Koreatown ===
Due to a large number of South Korean residents, Wangjing has also become known as Beijing's Koreatown. More than 70,000 South Koreans were living in the neighborhood in 2007. From 2008 to 2017, the Korean population in Wangjing had decreased due to the economic crisis which causes higher rates of living expenses.

== Administrative divisions ==
As of 2021, there are 25 communities within the subdistrict:

Administrative Division Code	Community (English)	Community Name (Chinese)
110105026034	Huajiadi Xili	花家地西里
110105026035	Fangzhouyuan	方舟苑
110105026036	Daxiyang Xincheng	大西洋新城
110105026038	Wangjing Xiyuan Siqu	望京西园四区
110105026039	Nanhu Dongyuan	南湖东园
110105026040	Nanhu Xili	南湖西里
110105026041	Huajiadi	花家地
110105026042	Wanghualu Xili	望花路西里
110105026043	Wanghualu Dongli	望花路东里
110105026044	Huajiadi Nanli	花家地南里
110105026045	Nanhu Zhongyuan	南湖中园
110105026046	Huajiadi Xili Sanqu	花家地西里三区
110105026047	Huajiadi Beili	花家地北里
110105026048	Shengxing	圣星
110105026049	Shuangqiulu	爽秋路
110105026050	Nanhu Xiyuan	南湖西园
110105026051	Wangjing Xiyuan Sanqu	望京西园三区
110105026060	Wangjingyuan	望京园
110105026061	Nanhu Xiyuan Erqu	南湖西园二区
110105026062	Wangjing Dongyuan Wuqu	望京东园五区
110105026063	Furongjie	阜荣街
110105026064	Wangjing Xilu	望京西路
110105026065	Xiadu Yafeng	夏都雅园
110105026066	Guofeng	国风
110105026067	Baoxing	宝星

== Geography ==
=== Location ===
Wangjing overlaps with the Wangjing sub-district office's area of responsibility. It includes the East Lake sub-district office and part of the Cuigezhuang Township. It is a pentagonal and diamond-shaped area surrounded by the fourth Ring Road, the Beijing-Chengde Expressway, the fifth Ring Road, and the Airport Expressway. In a broad sense, it includes Jiuxianqiao, Taiyanggong, Laiguangying, and Dongba. Wangjing is about 10 kilometers away from both the Beijing Capital International Airport and the center of The city (Tiananmen Square). It is located in the center of the six high-end functional areas planned and constructed in Beijing since the 11th Five-Year Plan.

=== Environment ===
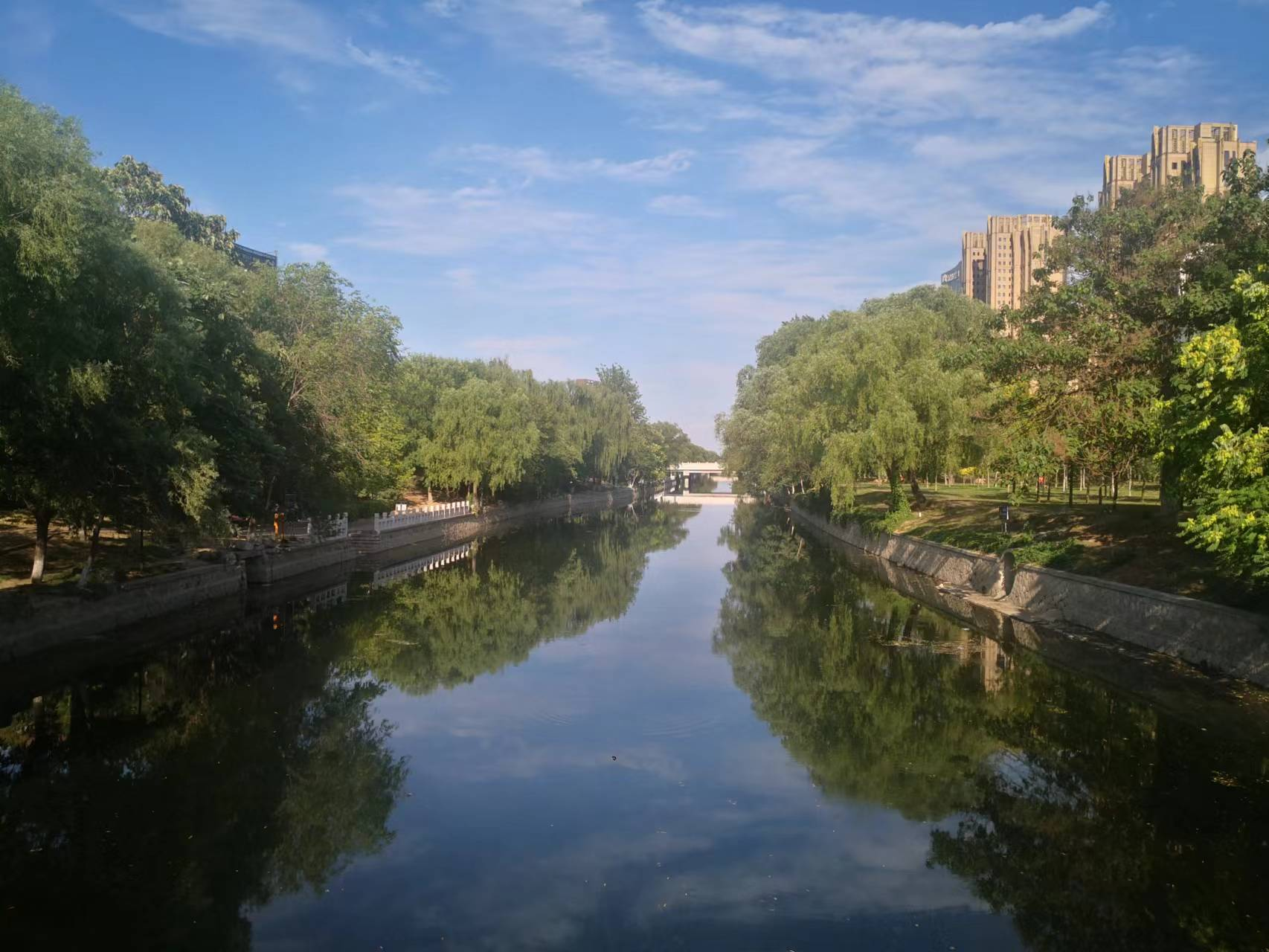
Beixiao River in Spring

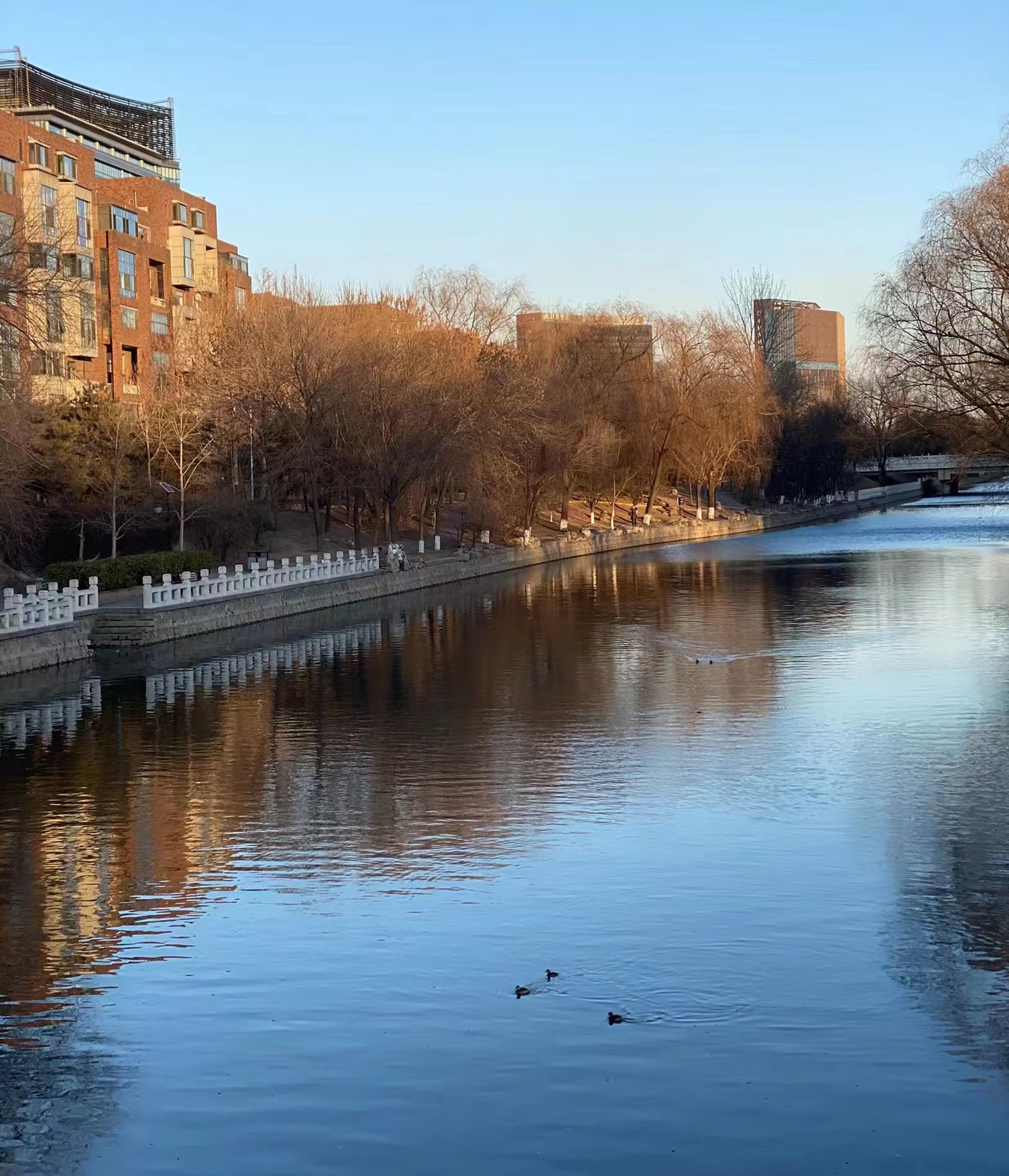
Beixiao River in Winter

Wangjing area mainly features plain topography. In the north, the Beixiao River runs from west to east. There are mounds in the east which are probably the Wangjing Dun that was used for military affairs in the Ming dynasty. On the west and south, there are more than ten connected parks and green spaces.

=== Layout ===
The urban planning function of Wangjing in the early stage divided Wangjing into two parts which are the south part and the north part. The south part is called Wangjing New Town. Wangjing New Town is a comprehensive area with public facilities and residential buildings. The north part is named Wangjing Science and Technology Industrial Park which later forms the main body of East Lake Street. Overall, Wangjing can be roughly divided into four blocks with different characteristics which are businesses in the east, living in the west, education in the south, and science in the north.

== Demographics ==
According to the 2010 census, the resident population of Wangjing is about 300,000, and there are a large number of residents in the entertainment industry, enterprise managers, employees of foreign companies, lawyers, doctors, journalists, and international businessmen. Wangjing has a large proportion of the middle class and younger age population.

As of 2010, many South Koreans moving to Beijing had settled in Wangjing. Most South Korean business people and their families in Beijing live in Wangjing. Hyejin Kim, the author of International Ethnic Networks and Intra-Ethnic Conflict: Koreans in China, wrote that the growth of Wangjing has eclipsed Wudaokou in Haidian District as a Korean area.

== Economy ==
=== Science and technology ===
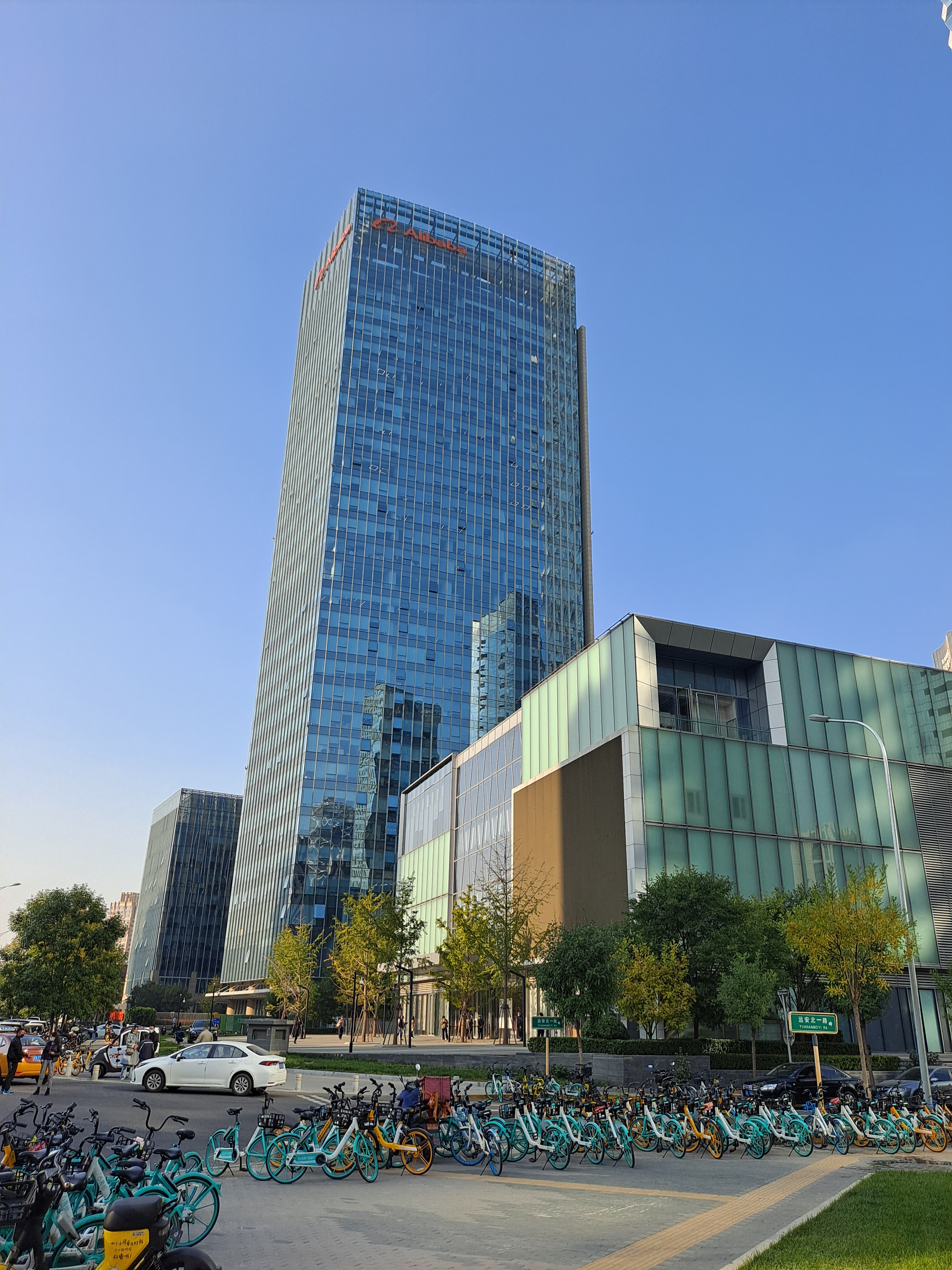
Alibaba Group Beijing

Wangjing has a high concentration of industrial, scientific, and technological innovation companies. The former Wangjing Science and Technology Industrial Park has now expanded to the east and south of Wangjing and is collectively known as the West District of Electronic City. Its goal and mission are to establish China's Mobile Valley. In October 2012, the State Council approved that the West District of Electronics City, including Dawangjing Business District, could be included in the Zhongguancun National Independent Innovation Demonstration Zone. Dawangjing Business District is positioned as an internationally influential science and technology business innovation zone, a gathering place for science and technology business activities, a gathering place for international science and technology companies, as well as an assembling place for modern service industry headquarters.

=== Technology center ===
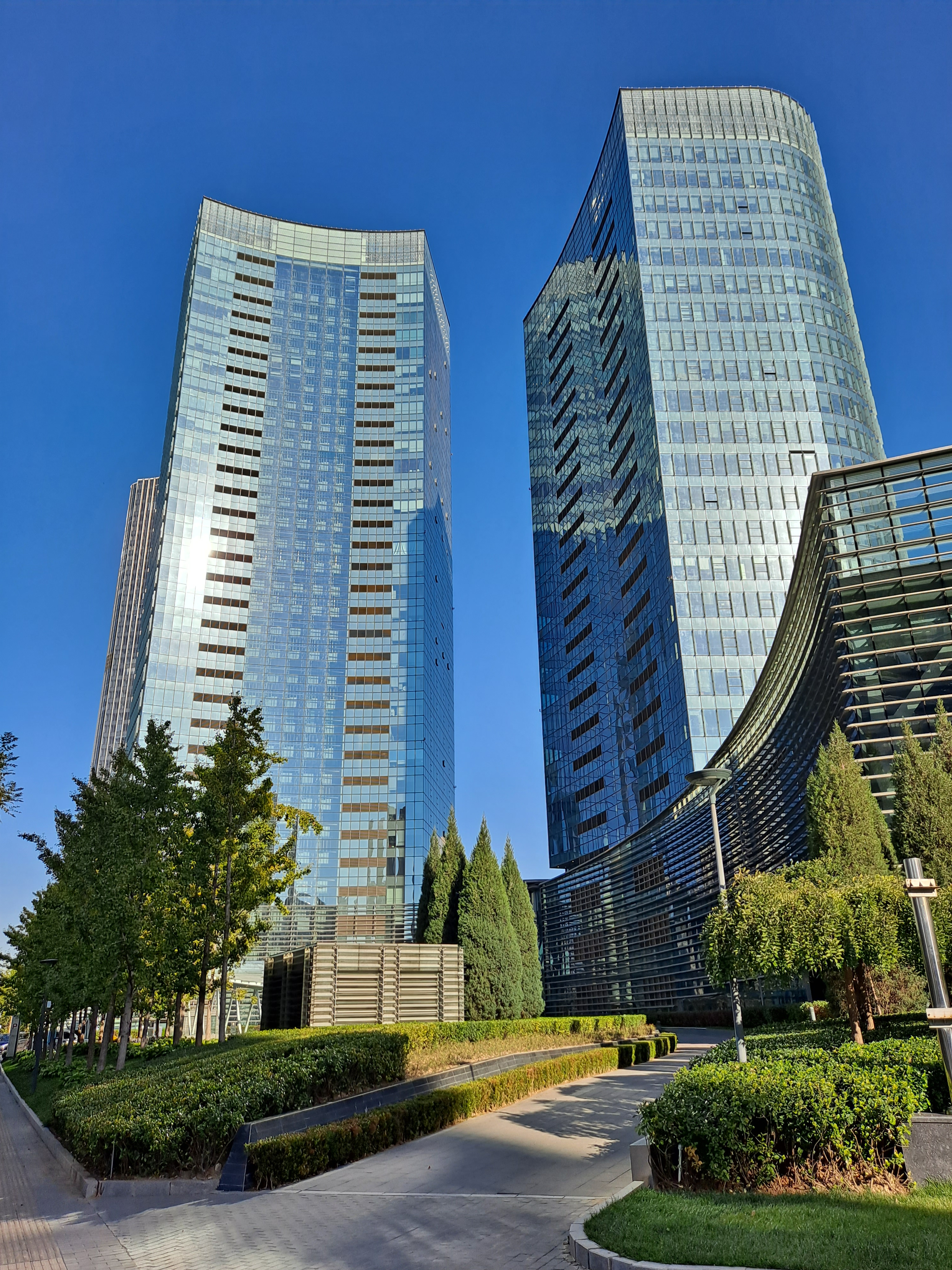
Posco China headquarters

Wangjing houses many technology companies, both small startup companies, as well as national, and large international corporations. Examples include:

- Wangjing Science and Technology Park, houses mainly technology startup companies.
- A major office of China Telecom
- The Chinese headquarters of Siemens Ltd. China
- The Chinese headquarters of Caterpillar Inc.
- The Chinese headquarters of Daimler AG
- Posco China headquarters
- Nestle Greater China Headquarters
- MOTOROLA Mobility Technology China headquarters
- MOTOROLA Systems China headquarters
- Agilent China Headquarters
- Ericsson China Headquarters
- Microsoft China Headquarters
- Caterpillar China headquarters
- Schneider Electric China headquarters
- SONY Mobile Global Operations Center, global research and development center

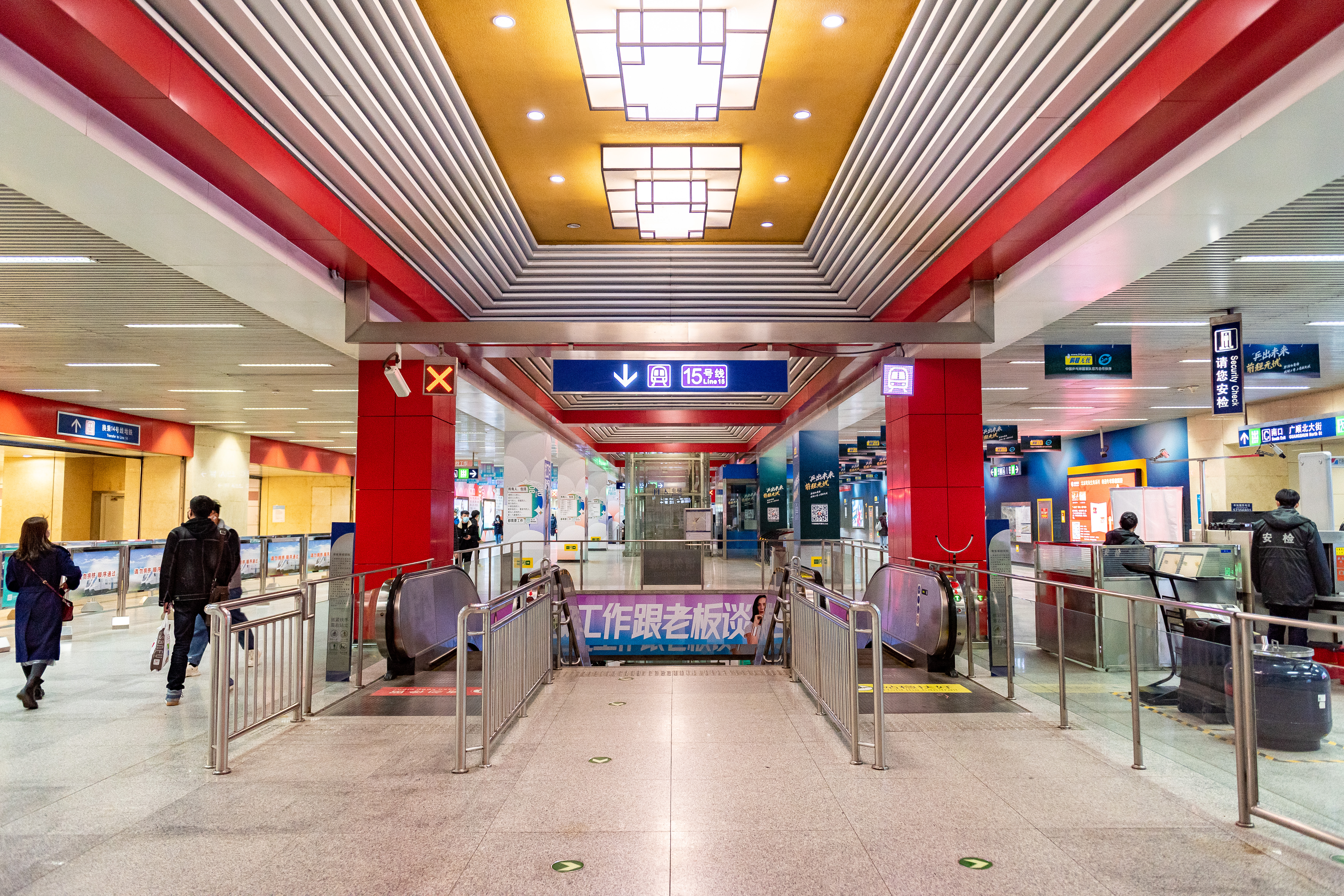
Beijing Subway Line 15 Wangjing Station

== Transportation ==
Wangjing is currently served by 4 subway stations—Wangjingxi station 13 15 , Wangjing station 14 15 , Futong station 14 and Wangjingnan station 14 . Line 17, which passes through Wangjingxi station, is scheduled to be opened by the end of 2023.

Wangjing West Transportation Hub, located at the southeast corner of the Jingcheng intersection and Huguang Middle Street, is under construction as of 2023. It is one of the 13 planned transportation hubs in Beijing. It provides transportation services for Beijing subway Line 13, Line 15, and Line 17. It is also in service of managing ground public transits, taxis, bicycles, and shuttles to Shunyi, Huairou, Miyun, and central Beijing.

== Architecture ==
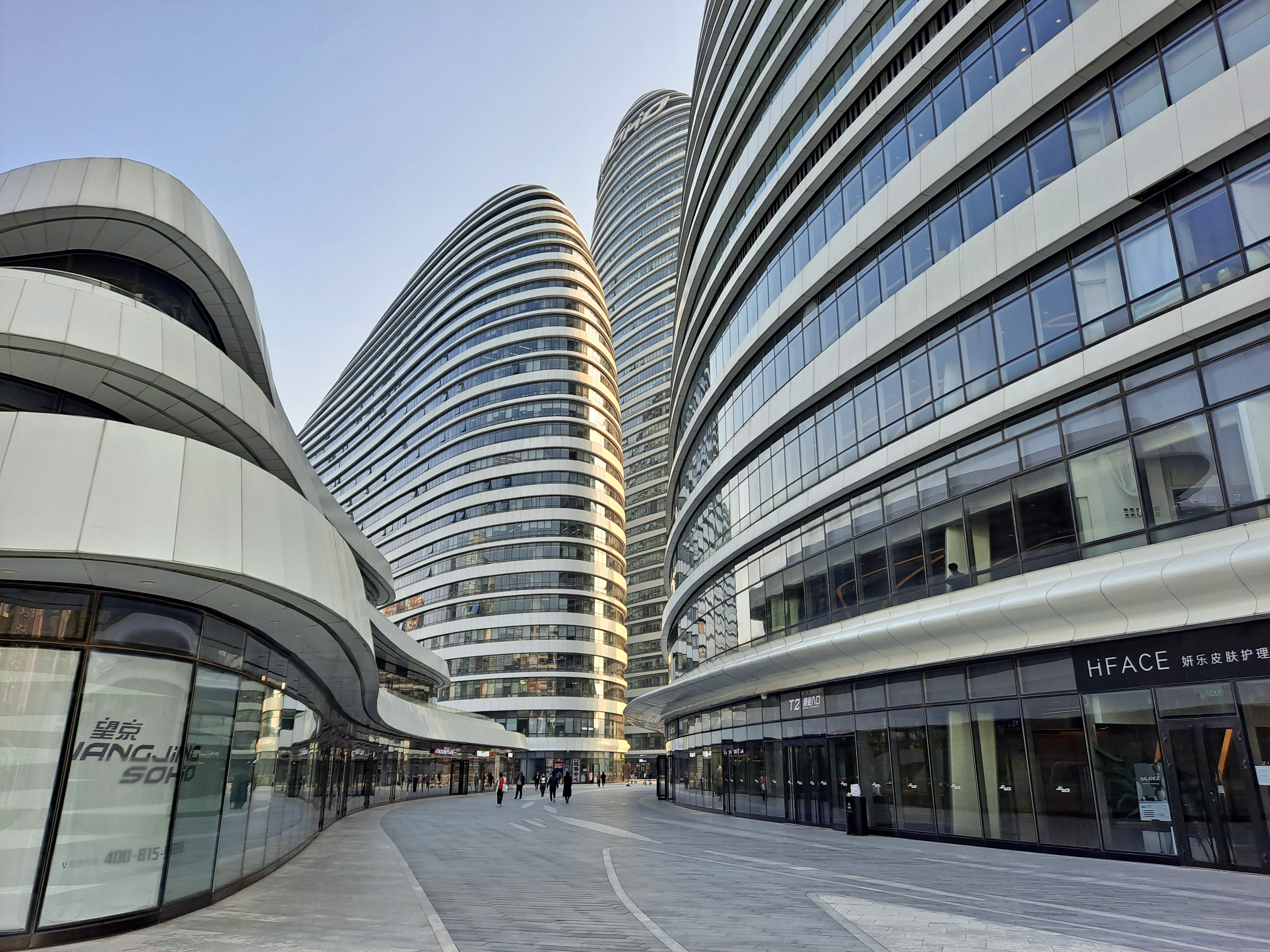
Wangjing SOHO

Wangjing SOHO stands halfway between Beijing Capital International Airport and the city center. Designed by Zaha Hadid, the three towers, 387, 416, and 656 (200m) feet tall, are surrounded by a 196,850-square-foot public park in Wangjing, a tech business hub in northeast Beijing. It was commissioned by SOHO China.

== Education ==
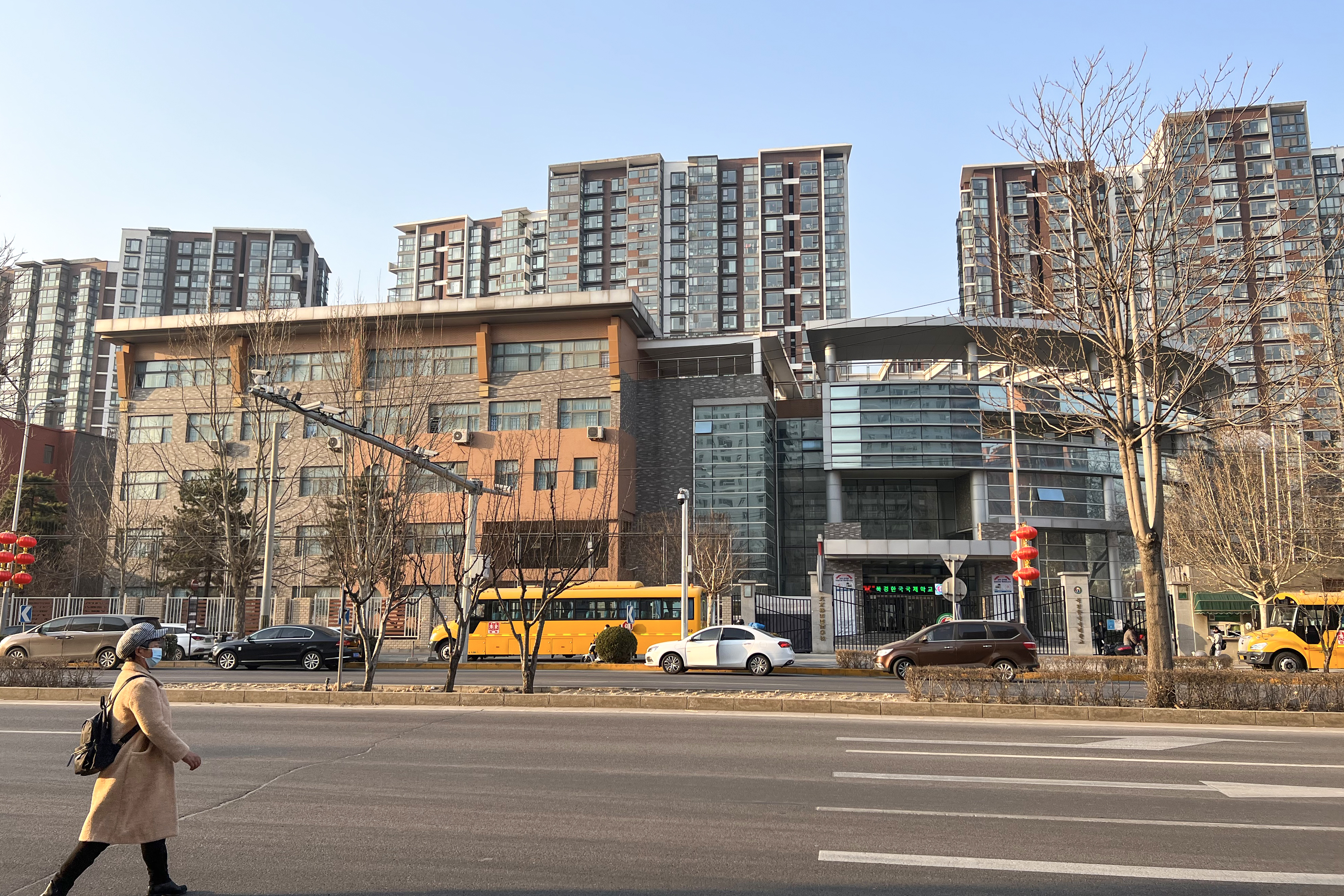
Korean International School in Beijing

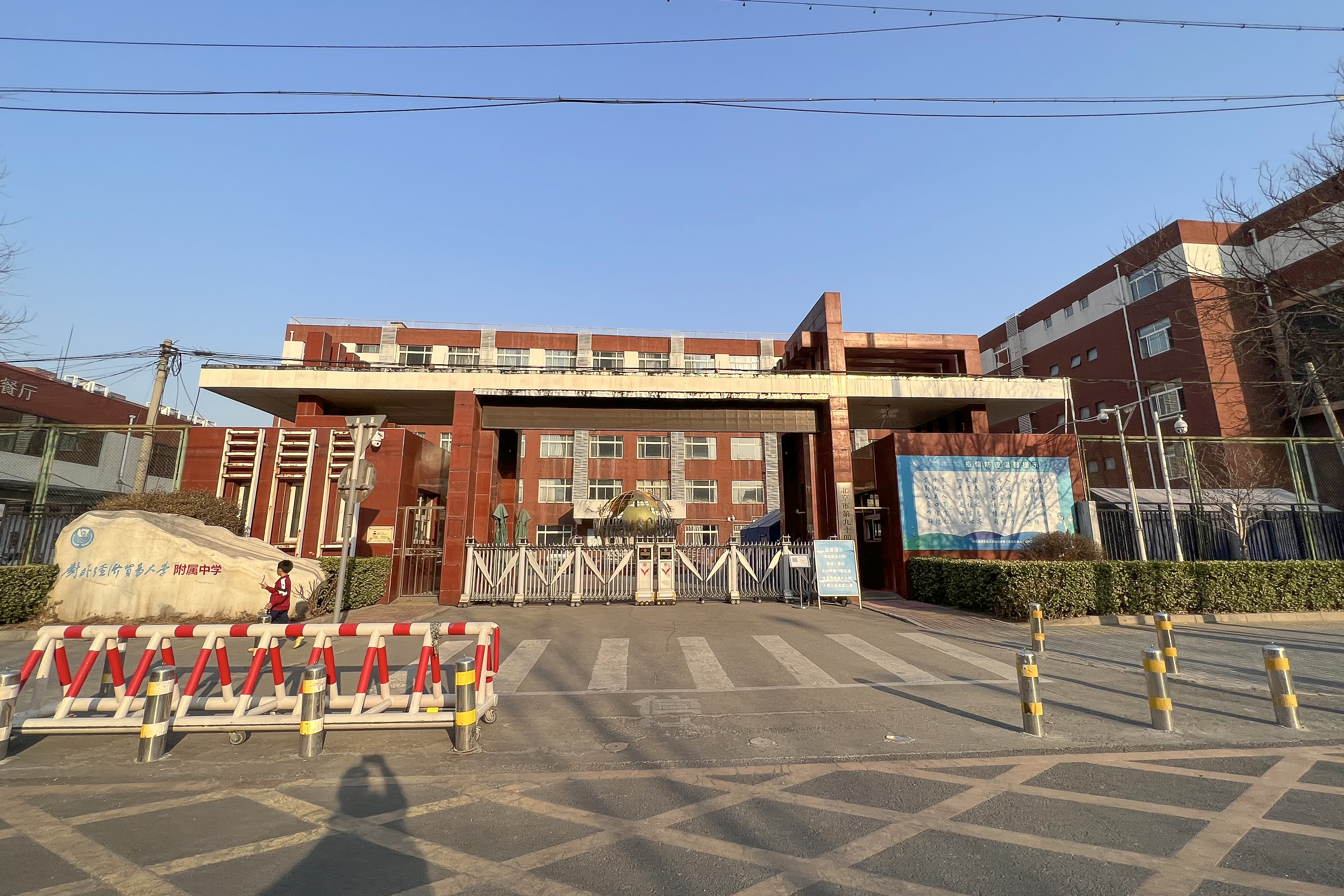
The Affiliated High School to UIBE (Formerly Beijing No. 94 Middle School)

There are primary schools, middle schools, and universities in Wangjing.

=== Primary schools, middle schools, and high schools ===
- Beijing No.80 High School (the only Beacon high school located in Chaoyang District)
- The Affiliated High School to UIBE (Formerly Beijing No. 94 Middle School)
- Beijing World Youth Academy (BWYA)
- Korean International School in Beijing (KISB)
- Wangjing Experimental School of Branch of Beijing Chen Jinglun Middle school

=== Universities ===
- China Central Academy of Fine Arts
- Beijing University of Chinese Medicine
- Beijing Youth Politics College
- Civil Aviation Management Institute of China (CAMIC)
- Graduate School of Chinese Academy of Social Sciences
- Wangjing Teaching Department, College of Continuing Education, Beijing Language and Culture University

== See also ==
- List of township-level divisions of Beijing
