= Futong station =

Beijing Subway station

Coordinates: 39.9927°N 116.4701°E

Futong 阜通
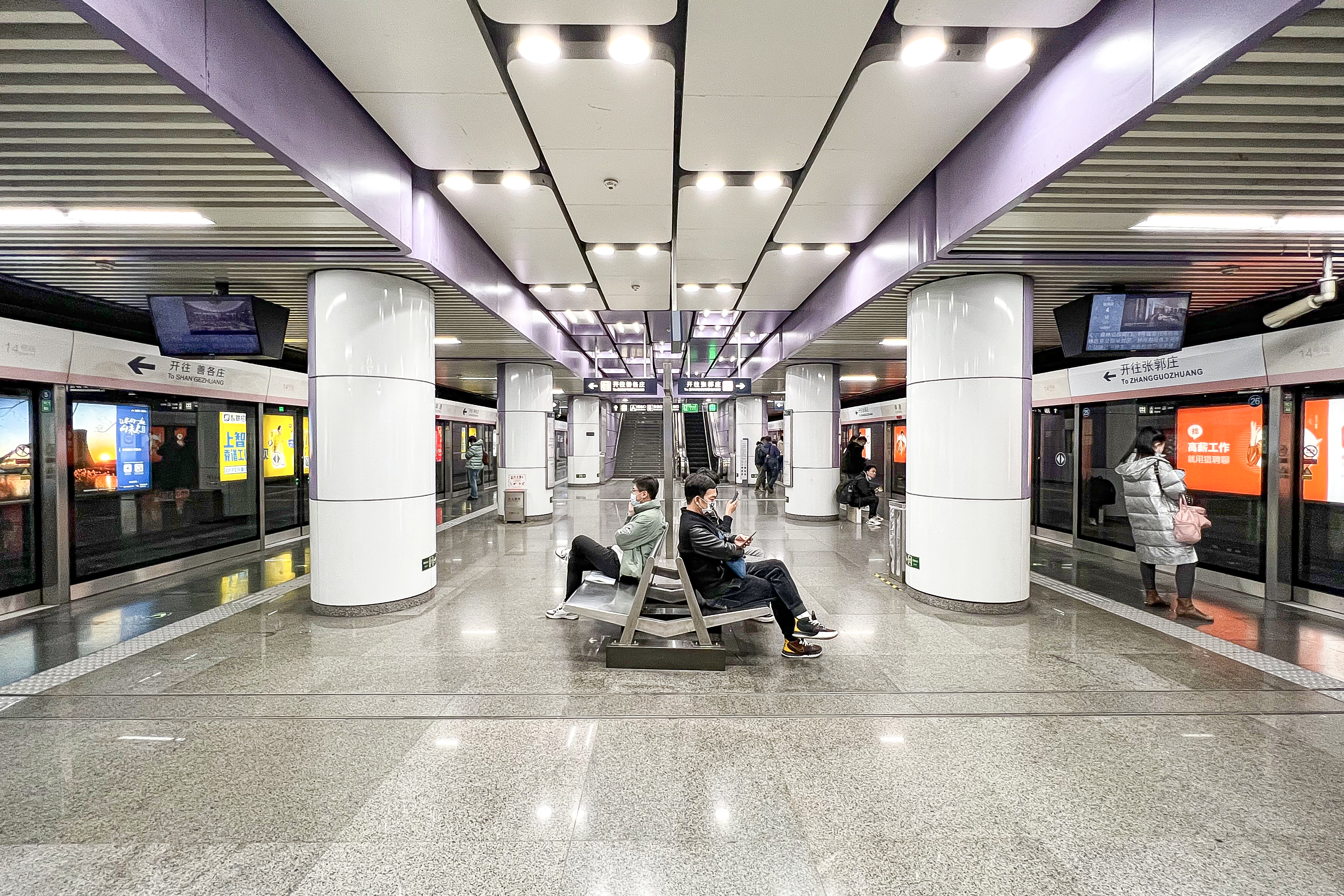
- Platform

General information
- Location: Guangshun South Street (广顺南大街) and Futong West Street (阜通西大街); Wangjing, Chaoyang District, Beijing; China
- Operator: Beijing MTR Corporation Limited
- Line: Line 14
- Platforms: 2 (1 island platform)
- Tracks: 2

Construction
- Structure type: Underground
- Accessible: Yes

History
- Opened: 28 December 2014

Services
Preceding station	Beijing Subway	Following station
Wangjingnan towards Zhangguozhuang	Line 14	Wangjing towards Shangezhuang
Location
- Location within Beijing

Futong (Chinese: 阜通站; pinyin: Fùtōng Zhàn) is a station on Line 14 of the Beijing Subway. It is located in Chaoyang District. The station opened on 28 December 2014.

== Station layout ==
The station has an underground island platform.

== Exits ==
There are 3 exits, lettered A, B, and C. Exit B is accessible.
