= Korean International School in Beijing =

Korean international school in China

- 북경한국국제학교 北京韩国国际学校
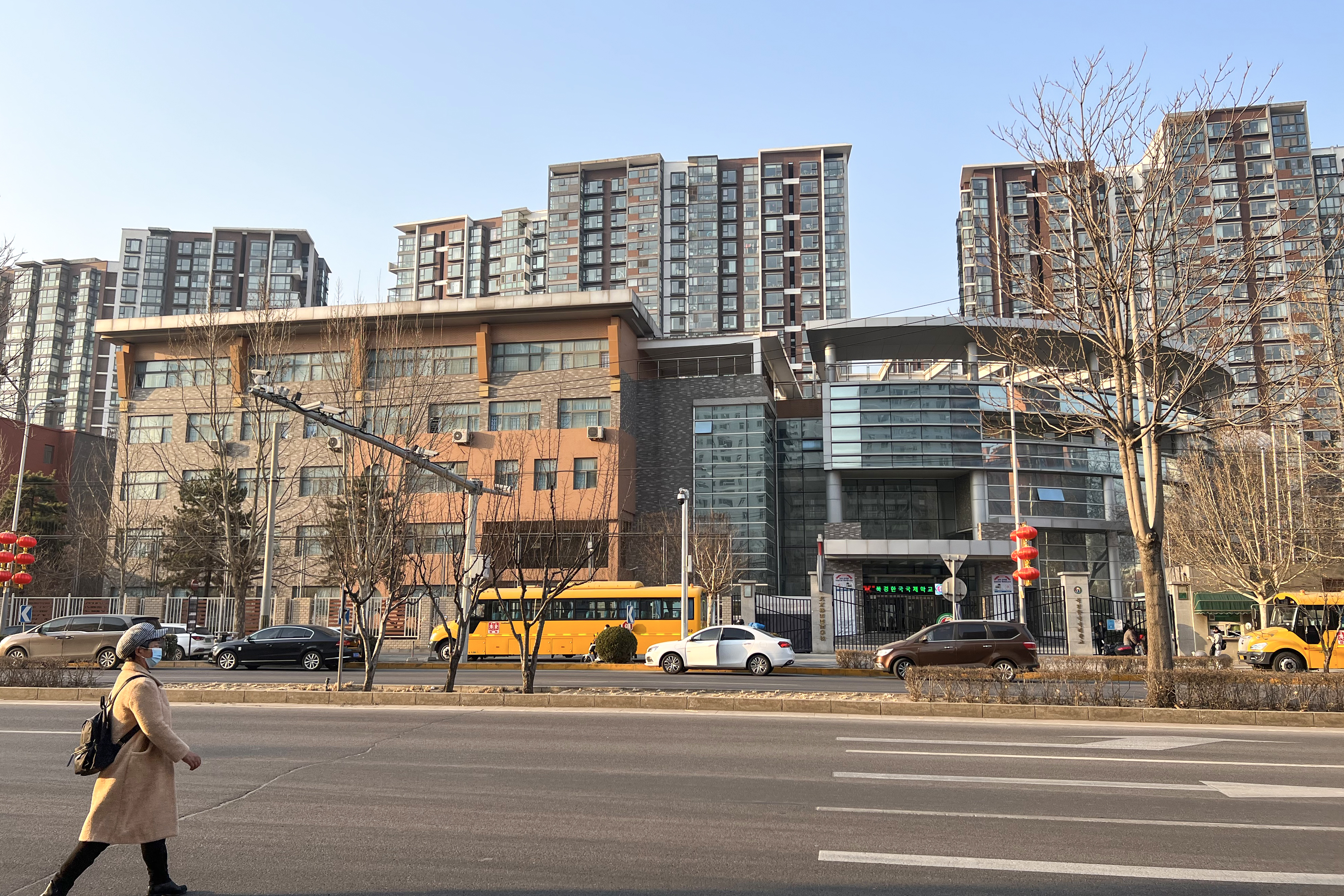

Location
- No.37 Wangjing Beilu, Chaoyang District, Beijing China 100102 Beijing; China; 40.011947°N 116.461094°E

Information
- Type: Korean international school
- Website: at0086.com/kisbj

Korean International School in Beijing

Chinese name
- Simplified Chinese: 北京韩国国际学校
- Traditional Chinese: 北京韓國國際學校
Transcriptions
Standard Mandarin
- Hanyu Pinyin: Běijīng Hánguó Guójì Xuéxiào

Korean name
- Hangul: 북경한국국제학교

The Korean International School in Beijing (KISB, Korean: 북경한국국제학교, Chinese: 北京韩国国际学校) is an international school in Wangjing, Chaoyang District, Beijing. It serves grades 1–12. It has instruction in Korean, Chinese, and English.

The school was established on December 19, 1996, as the Beijing Korean Kindergarten (北京韩国幼儿园). It received its current name on August 1, 1998. On December 19, 2000, the Chinese Ministry of Education allowed KISB to establish its senior high school department.

It was previously located in Changping District.

== See also ==
- Korean people in Beijing
- Shanghai Korean School
