= Chevrolet Traverse =

Full-size crossover SUV

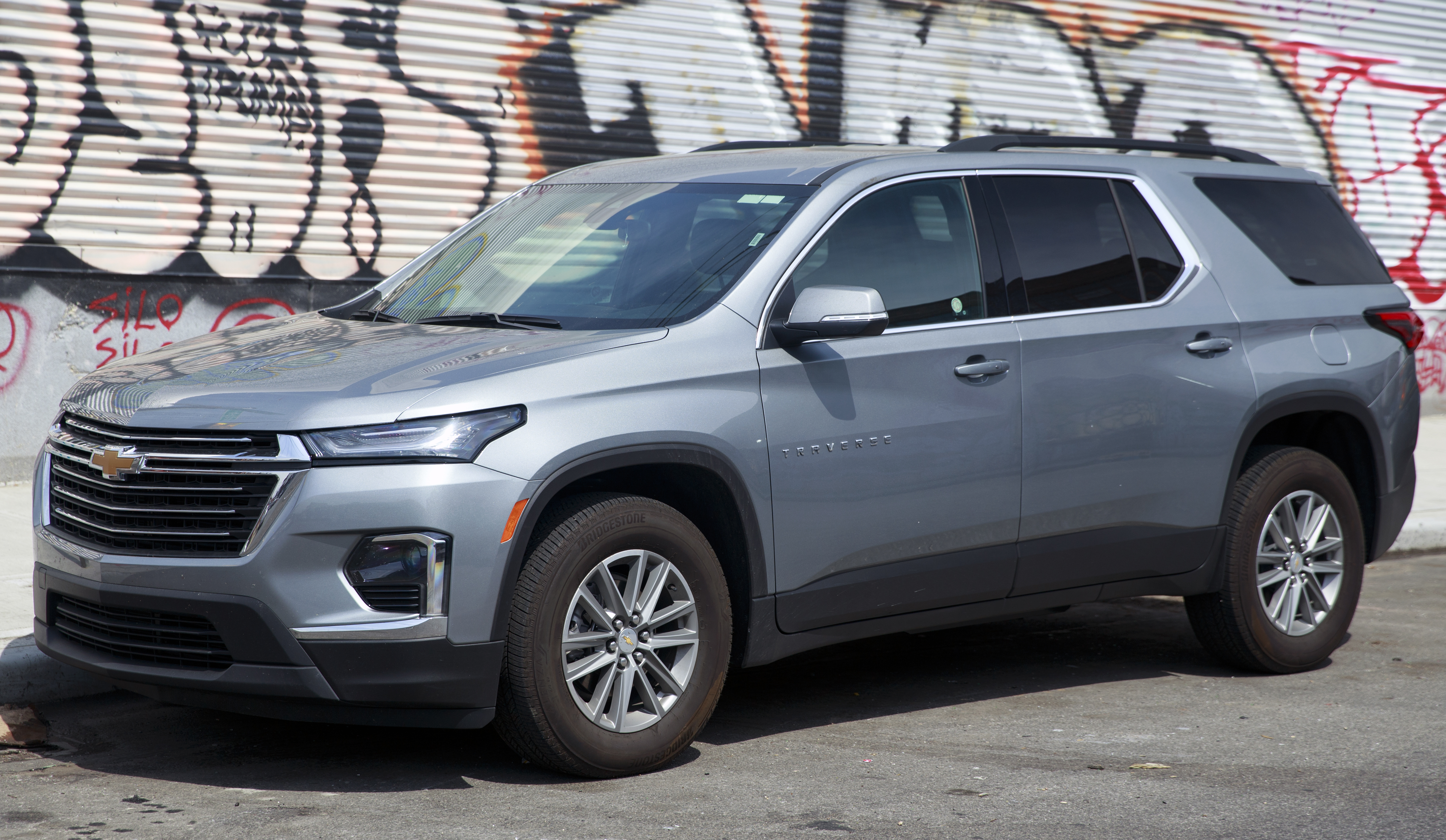
- Second generation facelift model

Overview
- Manufacturer: General Motors
- Production: 2008–present
- Model years: 2009–present

Body and chassis
- Class: Full-size crossover SUV
- Layout: Front-engine, front-wheel-drive; Front-engine, all-wheel-drive

Chronology
- Predecessor: Chevrolet TrailBlazer (first generation); Chevrolet Uplander

The Chevrolet Traverse is a full-size crossover SUV with three-row seating built by General Motors produced since the 2009 model year. It is built on the same platform as the GMC Acadia and Buick Enclave, known as the Lambda platform for the first generation, and the C1XX for the second generation. It also shares the C1XX platform with the Cadillac XT6. It is the successor to the TrailBlazer body-on-frame SUV and the Uplander minivan.

The second-generation model debuted in showrooms in the middle of 2017. Starting with the 2019 model year, the Traverse was slotted above the new mid-size Chevrolet Blazer as part of Chevrolet's plans to expand its SUV lineup.

The Traverse name was originally used for a concept car at the 2003 North American International Auto Show in Detroit, but that concept gave way when the Equinox launched for the 2005 model year.

== First generation (2009) ==
First generation
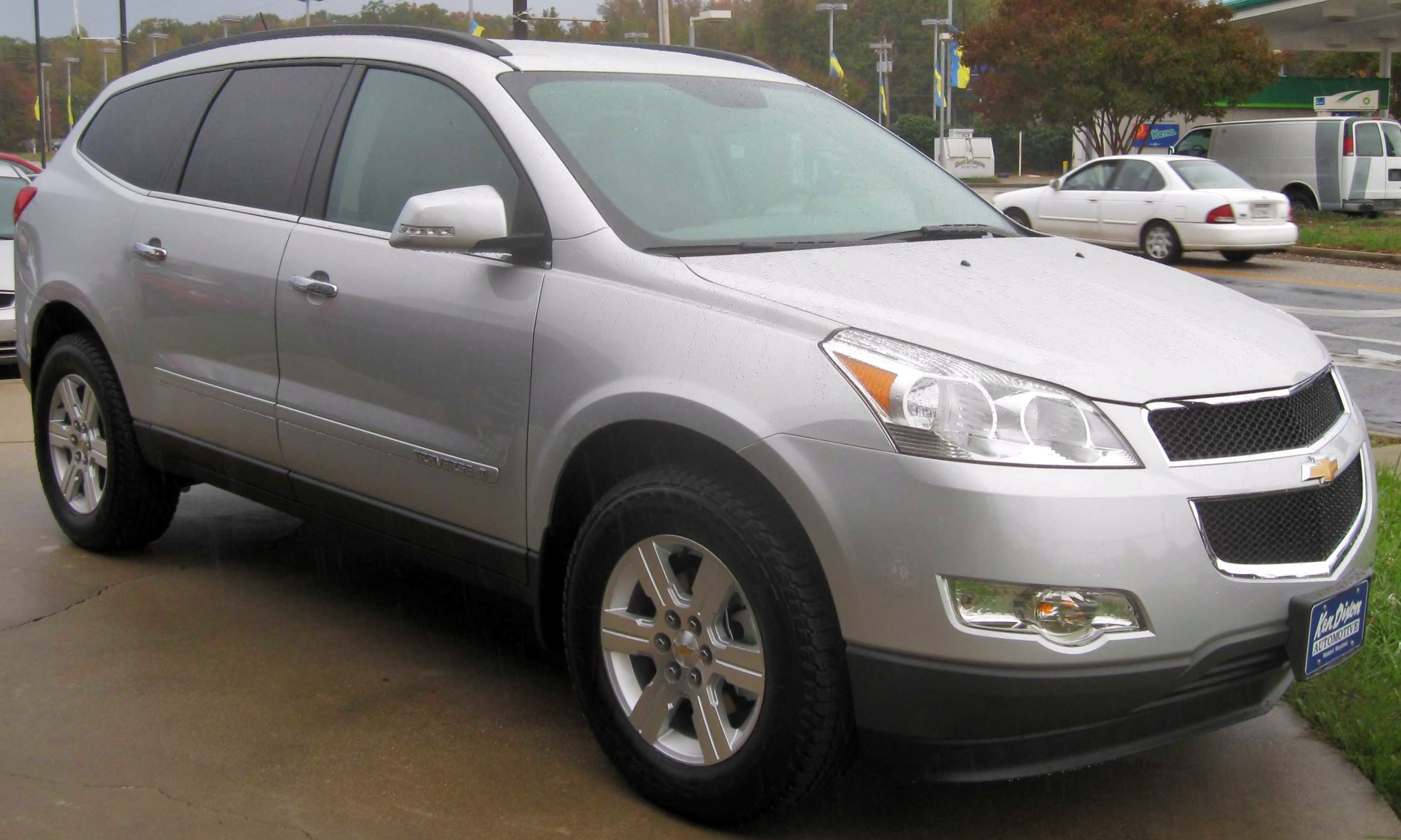

Overview
- Production: 2008–2017
- Model years: 2009–2017
- Assembly: United States: Spring Hill, Tennessee (Spring Hill Manufacturing, 2008–2009); Lansing, Michigan (Lansing Delta Township Assembly, 2010–2017)

Body and chassis
- Platform: GM Lambda platform/GMT561 (Series GMT960)
- Related: Buick Enclave; GMC Acadia; Saturn Outlook

Powertrain
- Engine: 3.6 L LLT V6
- Transmission: 6-speed 6T75 automatic

Dimensions
- Wheelbase: 118.9 in (3,020 mm)
- Length: 203.7–205.0 in (5,174–5,207 mm)
- Width: 78.4 in (1,991 mm)
- Height: 2009-2012: 69.7–72.8 in (1,770–1,849 mm); 2013-2017: 69.9 in (1,775 mm)
- Curb weight: 4,647–4,841 lb (2,108–2,196 kg)

The 2009 Chevrolet Traverse debuted at the 2008 Chicago Auto Show and the Traverse had arrived at every Chevrolet dealer in October 2008. The first Traverse was built at GM's Spring Hill, Tennessee, assembly plant during 2009, until its production was moved to GM's Delta Township, Michigan assembly plant in 2010.

The production Traverse's design was inspired by the 2005 Chevrolet Sequel concept, and has a chevron-shaped grille similar to the 2008 Chevrolet Malibu. The Traverse has unique sheet metal different from the other GM crossovers on the Lambda platform, with the exception of the doors.

The Chevrolet Traverse features the LLT engine, a 3,564 cc (217.5 cu in) DOHC V6 with VVT and direct injection, like other Lambda crossovers in 2009. A 6-speed automatic transmission delivers power in either front or all-wheel drive guise. The Traverse delivers 281 hp (210 kW; 285 PS) and 266 lb⋅ft (361 N⋅m) of torque in the LS and LT models. The LTZ trim, with dual exhaust, delivers 288 hp (215 kW; 292 PS) and 270 lb⋅ft (370 N⋅m) of torque.

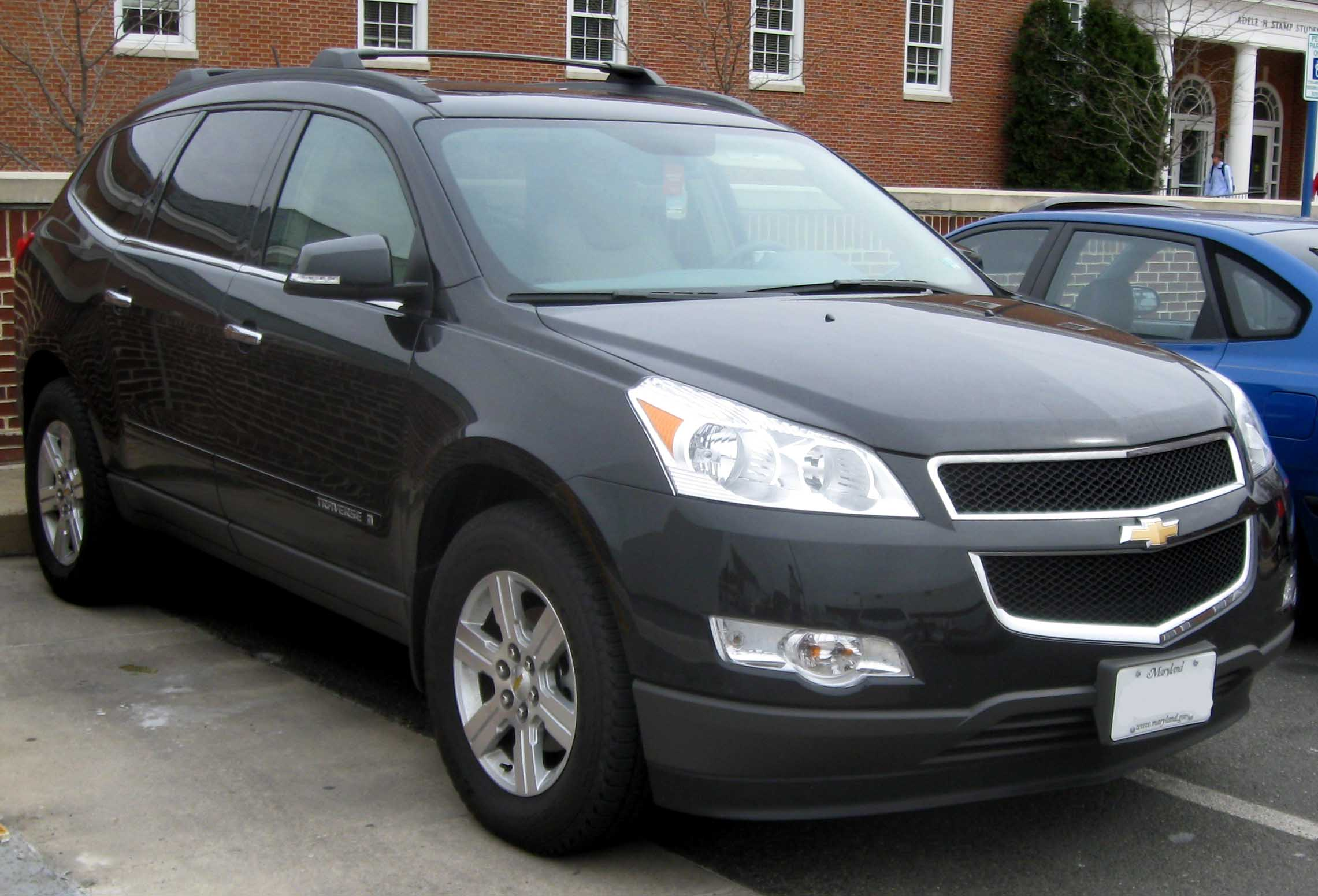
Front (pre-facelift)

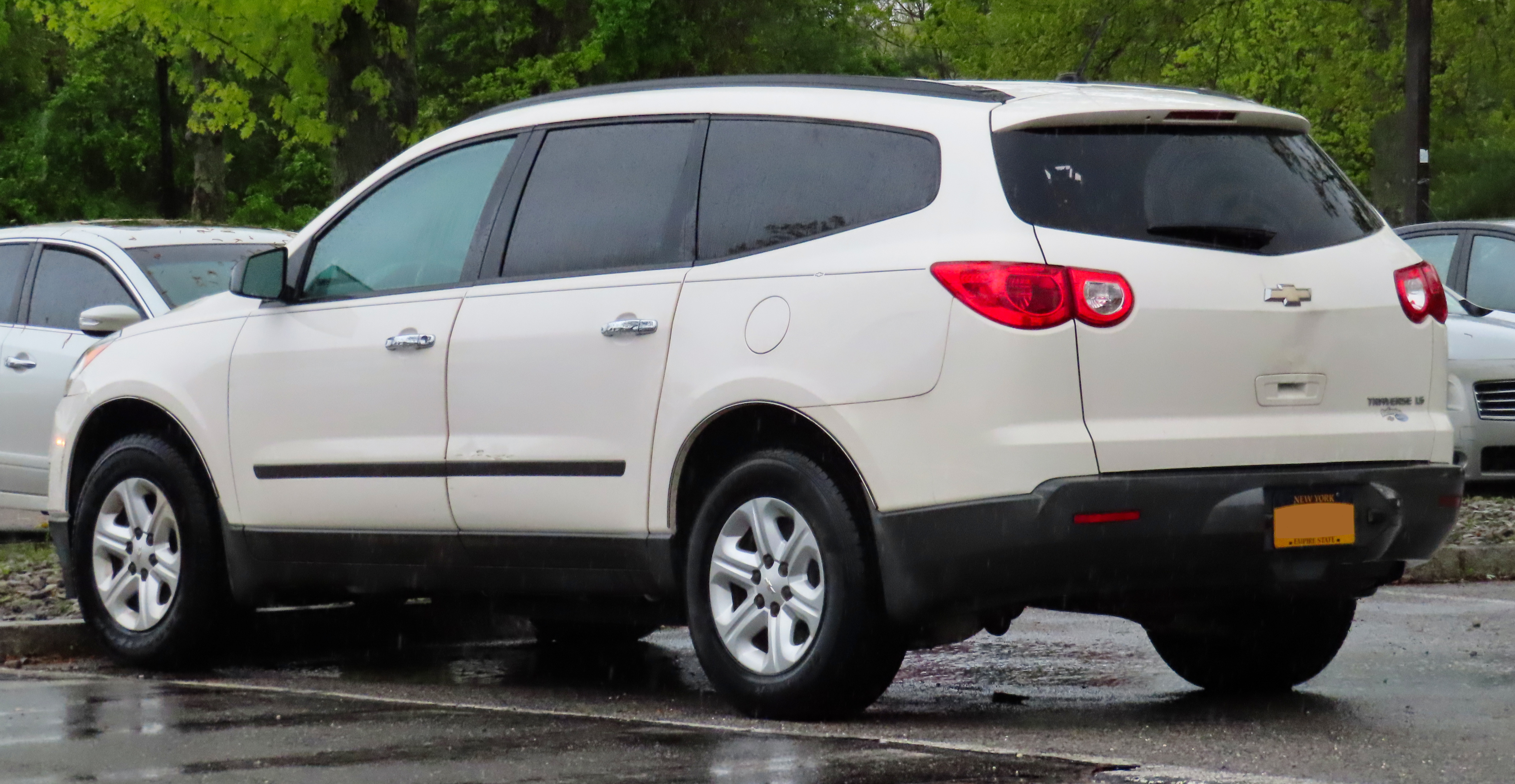
Rear (pre-facelift)

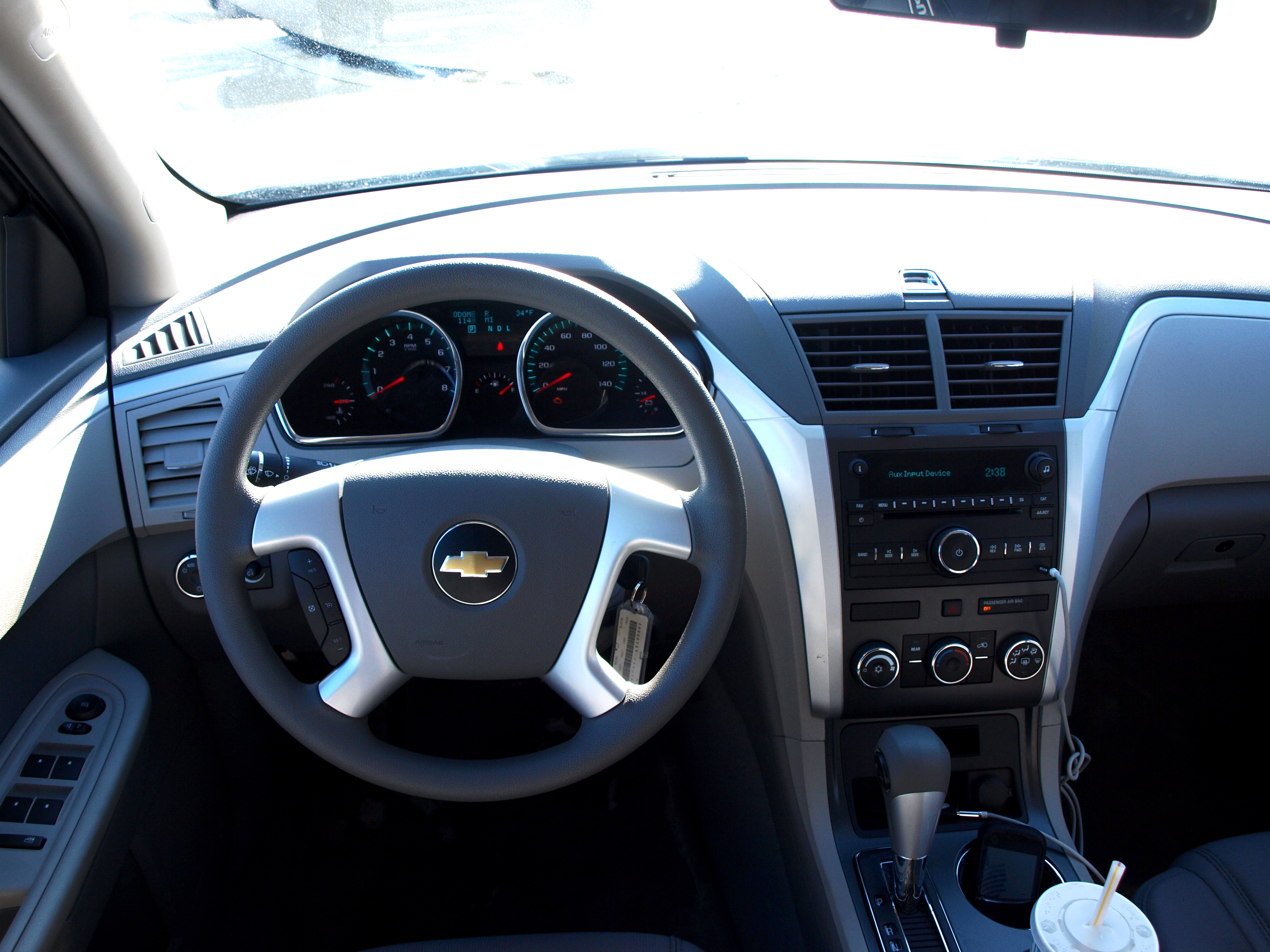
Interior (pre-facelift)

=== 2013 facelift ===
A facelift of the Chevrolet Traverse was unveiled at the 2012 New York International Auto Show. The 2013 Traverse received a new grille and front fascia, a redesigned rear liftgate, and reworked Camaro-inspired tail lights, and the transmission was reworked for improved shift quality and timing. Chevrolet's new color touchscreen and MyLink radios were standard, as well as wood interior trim. Both cloth and leather seating surfaces were available. Cloth was standard on the LS and 1LT models, and leather was standard on the LTZ. Both were available on the 2LT model. Some new wheels were available, and models continued to be offered in both front-wheel drive and all-wheel drive versions, ranging from the base LS to the top-of-the-line LTZ. A Bose audio system was standard on 2LT and LTZ models.

For 2014, Chevrolet added Forward Collision Alert and Lane Departure Warning to the Traverse. For 2015, a revised 18-inch wheel and Siri Eyes Free were added. For 2016, the Traverse included OnStar 4G LTE connectivity with Wi-Fi hotspot. For 2017, the LTZ trim was renamed to Premier.

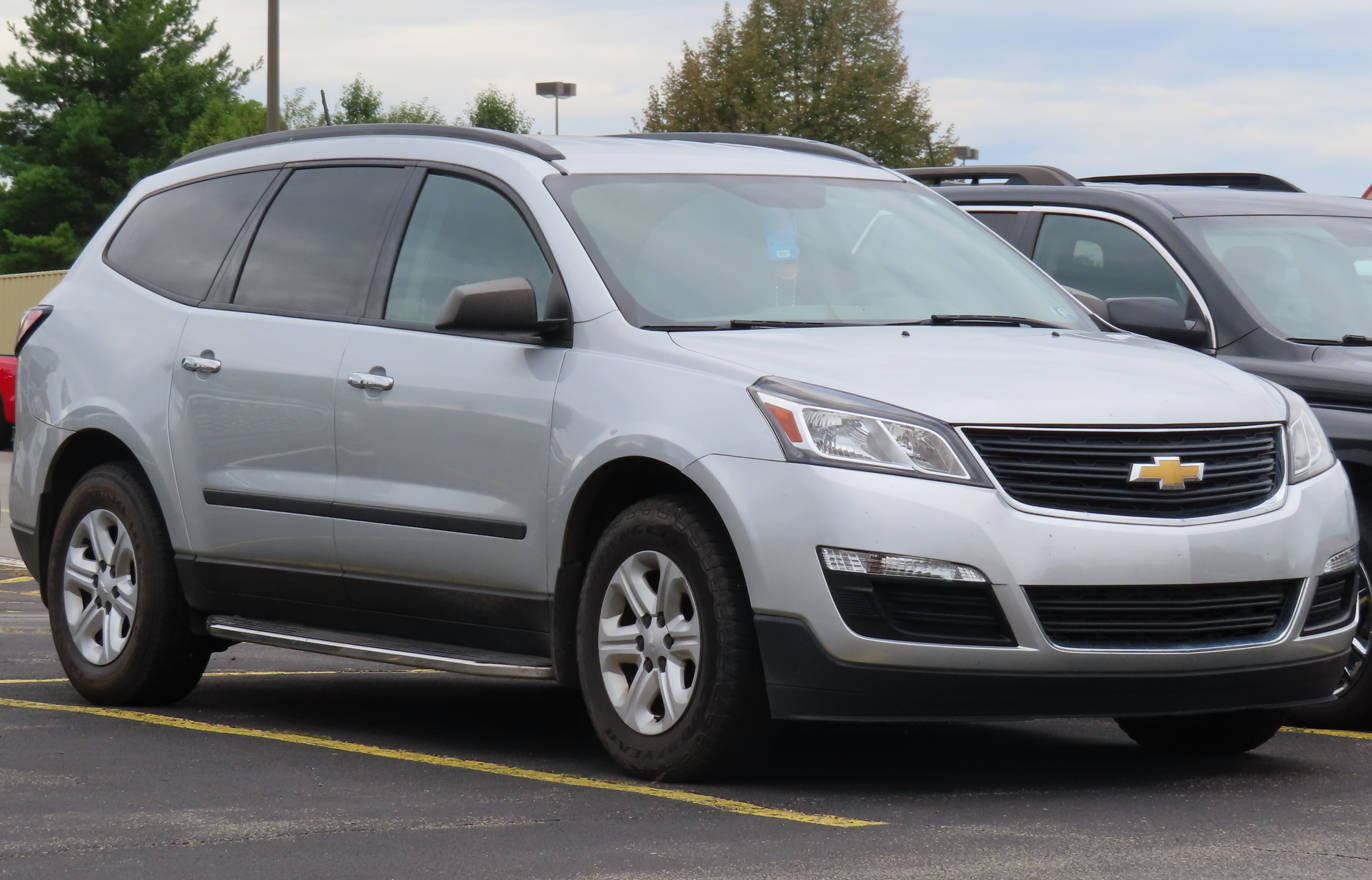
Front (facelift)

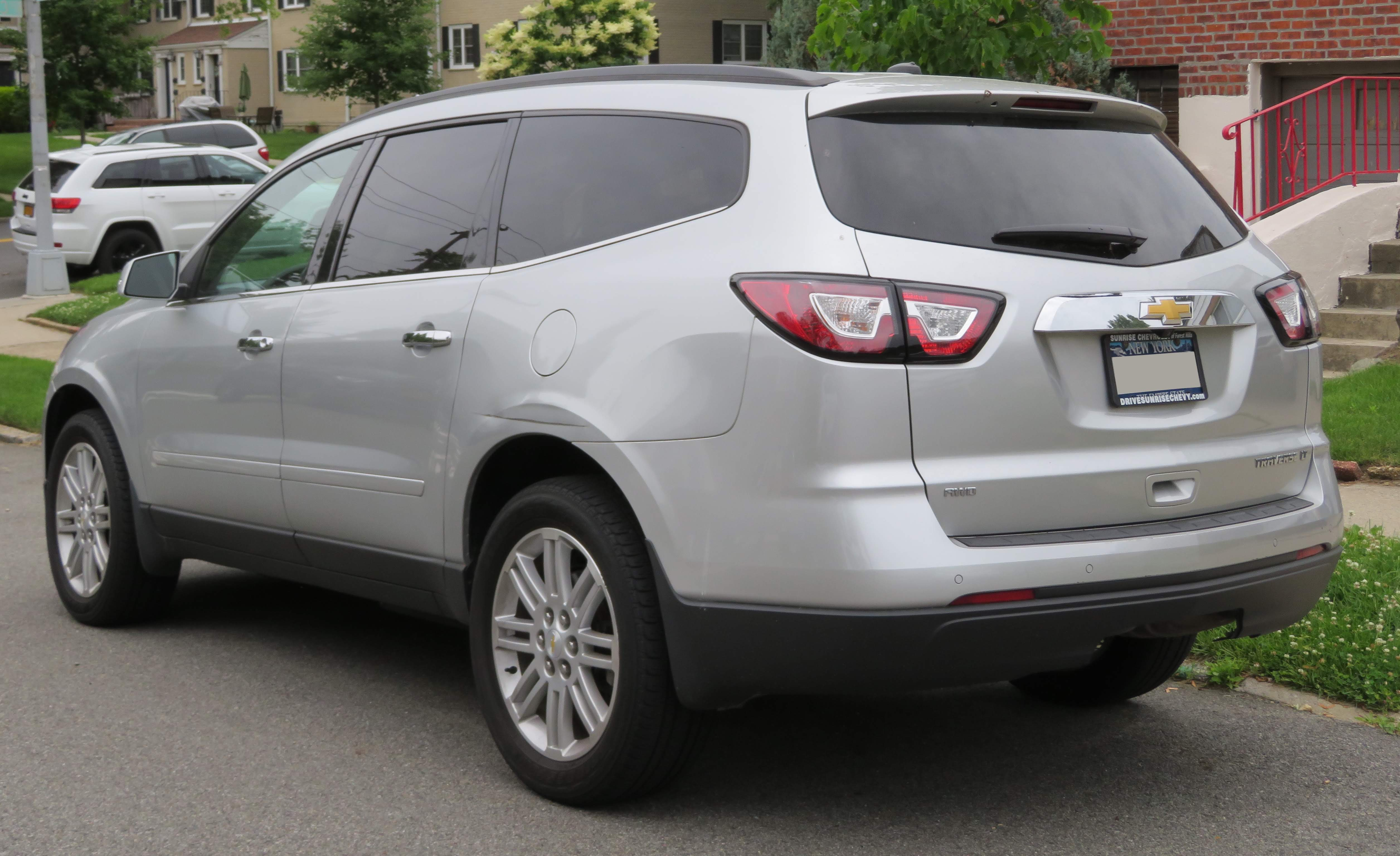
Rear (facelift)

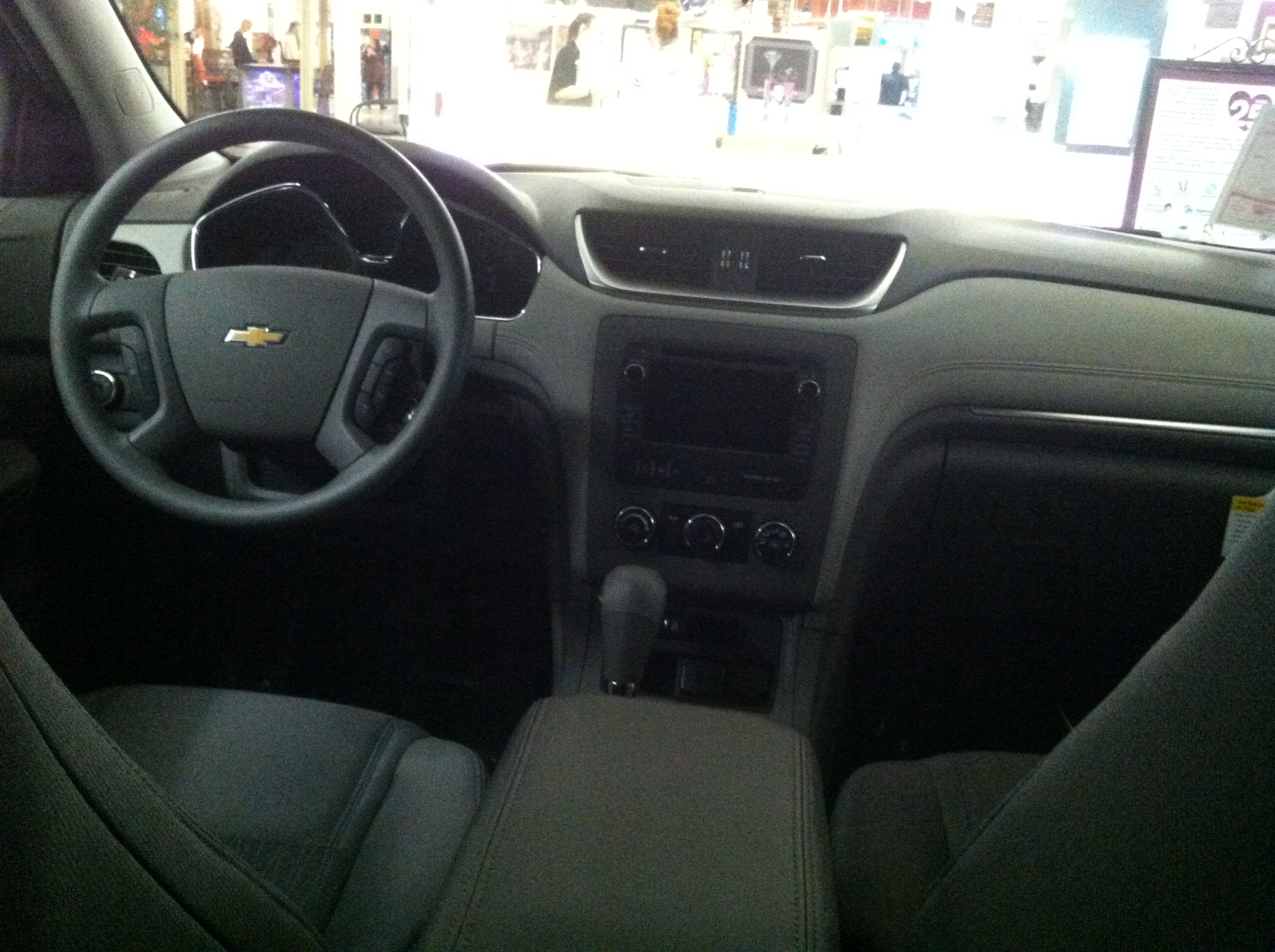
Interior (facelift)

=== Safety ===
2016 Chevrolet Traverse on NHTSA
Overall:	5/5 stars
Frontal Driver:	5/5 stars
Frontal Passenger:	5/5 stars
Side Driver:	5/5 stars
Side Passenger:	5/5 stars
Side Pole Driver:	5/5 stars
Rollover AWD:	15.5%

IIHS scores (2015)
Category	Rating
Moderate overlap frontal offset	Good
Small overlap frontal offset	Not tested^{1}
Side impact	Good
Roof strength	Good^{2}

^{1} vehicle structure rated "Good"
^{2} strength-to-weight ratio: 4.00

== Second generation (2018) ==
Second generation
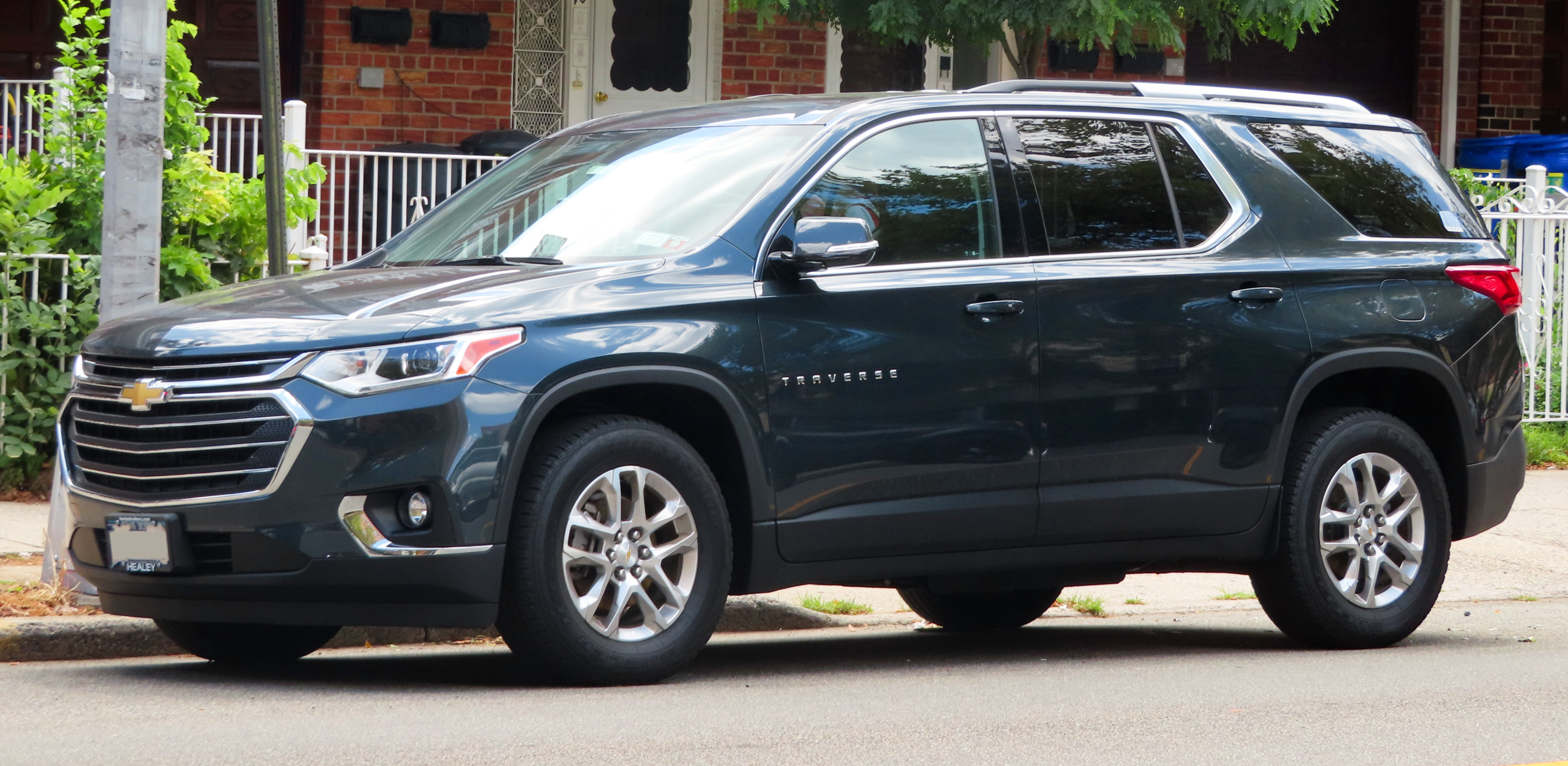

Overview
- Also called: Chevrolet Traverse Limited (2024)
- Production: 2017–2025
- Model years: 2018–2024 (North America); 2019–2025 (South Korea)
- Assembly: United States: Lansing, Michigan (Lansing Delta Township Assembly)

Body and chassis
- Platform: GM C1XX
- Related: Buick Enclave; Cadillac XT6; GMC Acadia

Powertrain
- Engine: 2.0 L LTG turbo I4 (RS 2WD); 3.6 L LFY V6
- Transmission: 9-speed 9T65 automatic

Dimensions
- Wheelbase: 120.9 in (3,071 mm)
- Length: 204.3 in (5,189 mm)
- Width: 78.6 in (1,996 mm)
- Height: 70.7 in (1,796 mm)
- Curb weight: ≥ 4,362 lb (1,979 kg)

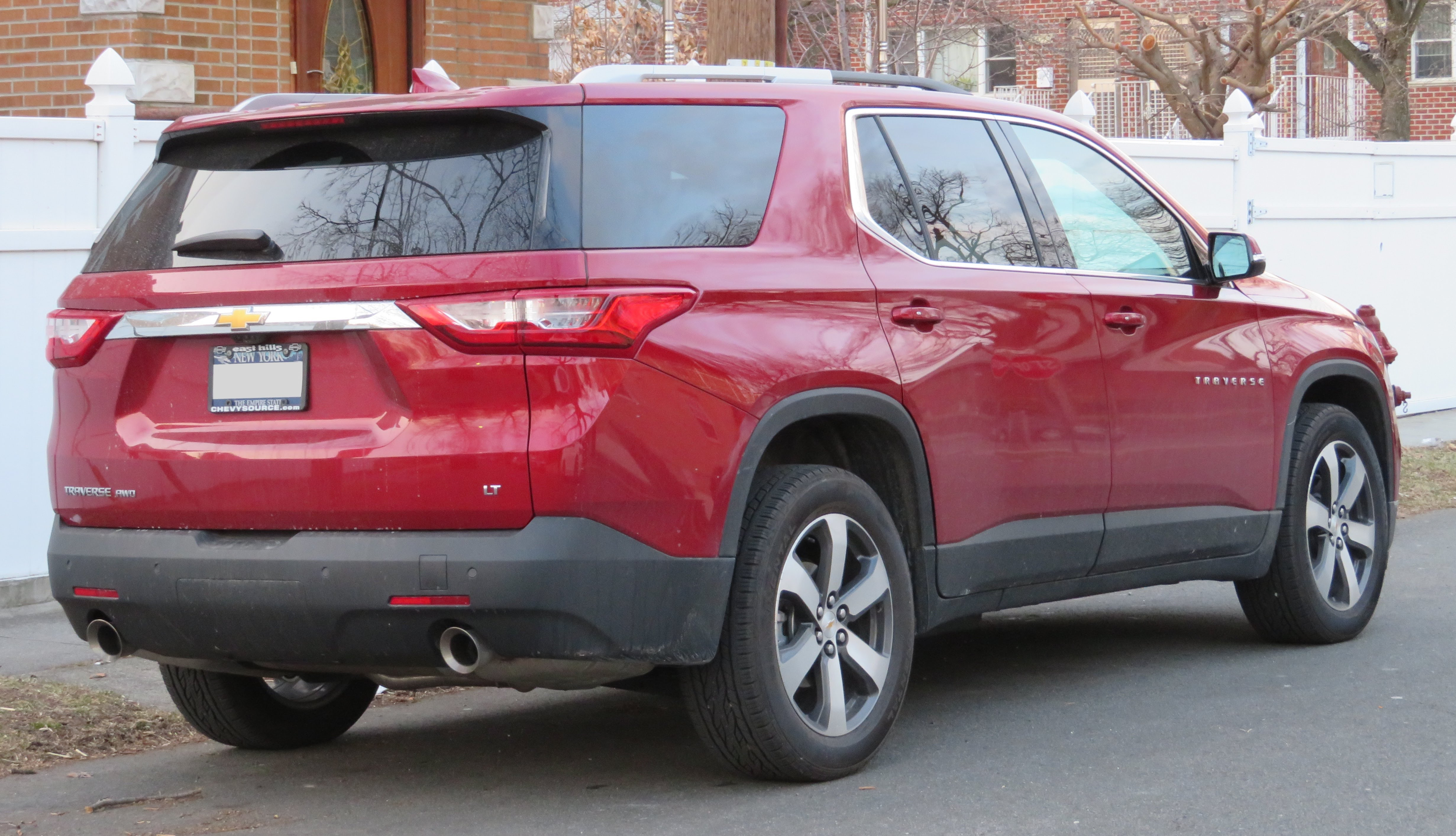
Rear view

On January 23, 2017, General Motors unveiled the second generation Traverse at the 2017 North American International Auto Show in Detroit. Introduced for a 2018 model year, it went on sale in July 2017. The Buick Enclave and Chevrolet Traverse were still on the same platform, however, both cars got smaller and lighter and got reclassified as midsize SUVs. While Chevrolet made the vehicle in North America, it exported the Traverse to the Middle East and selected South American countries. The Traverse was launched to the Russian market in 2018, and was sold in South Korea in the second half of 2019, where it is touted as a "Super SUV" and its largest Crossover SUV in that region.

The second-generation Traverse adopted a more truck-like design, similar to the Tahoe, while taking some cues from the now mid-size Acadia, with the Chevrolet front grille design. It is similar in dimension to the first generation model, adding an extra 2 inches (51 mm) of wheelbase and 0.7 inches (18 mm) more overall length, and it loses 111 pounds (50 kg) to come in at a weight of 4,362 pounds (1,979 kg). It remains an 8-seat (or 7-seat optional) passenger vehicle.

There are five trim levels available for the second-generation Traverse: L, LS, LT, Premier, and High Country (see below for trim level content). All the trim levels are available in either Front Wheel Drive (FWD) or All Wheel Drive (AWD) drive type configurations except for the L trim level, which is only available in FWD, and the High Country trim level, which is only available in AWD. In addition, there are two types of all-wheel-drive systems available for this generation of Traverse: the standard AWD system that allows user to disconnect the prop-shaft until rear traction is needed and the twin-clutch Twinster version (available only with High Country trim) with two rear clutches to more directly apply torque to the rear wheel that needs it most, both are developed by GKN Driveline.

At the introductory period, a 3.6L V6 gasoline engine making 310 horsepower (230 kW; 310 PS) and 266 pound-feet (361 N⋅m) of torque was one of two engine options available, mated to a nine-speed automatic transmission with either Front Wheel Drive or All Wheel Drive. A 2.0L turbocharged inline-4 making 257 horsepower (192 kW; 261 PS) and 295 pound-feet (400 N⋅m) of torque was the other available engine, but could only be optioned in RS Front Wheel Drive models from 2017 to 2019.

The new Traverse gained some new technology, some of which is currently available on other models such as the Chevrolet Equinox, Chevrolet Tahoe, and Chevrolet Suburban. Some of this technology included a hands-free power tailgate, the latest-generation MyLink infotainment systems with Apple CarPlay and Android Auto, a power-folding 60/40 split third-row rear bench seat, and standard keyless access with push-button start.

The updated Traverse was originally planned to start sales in late 2020, but was delayed due to production issues caused by the COVID-19 pandemic, with sales started in late 2021 as a 2022 model year instead. The 2022 Traverse retained the 3.6-liter V6 gasoline engine with the 9-speed automatic transmission. The base L trim was dropped from the lineup.

The Traverse received a facelift in 2021 for the 2022 model year. The 2023 model year was originally anticipated to be the last for the second generation to make way for the third generation. However, due to a slow ramp-up of production of the third generation, partially attributed to the 2023 United Auto Workers strike, a shortened 2024 model year was produced for the second generation, called the Chevrolet Traverse Limited.

=== Trim levels ===
The second-generation Chevrolet Traverse was offered in five different trim levels: L, LS, LT (with Cloth and Leather variants), Premier, and High Country. Most are available with either front-wheel drive (FWD) or all-wheel drive (AWD), except for the base L, which is only available with FWD, and the top-of-the-line High Country, which is only available with AWD. There are also two appearance packages available: RS and Redline Edition.

=== Model year changes ===
For 2019, the Blackout Package was added as an available option on LS, LT, and Premier trim levels.

The 2.0L I4 turbo engine (exclusive to the RS trim level) was discontinued for the 2020 model year (starting midway through the 2019 model year). Also, the MyLink system was replaced by the Infotainment 3 system and a buckle-to-drive feature was added to the Teen Driver system.

For 2021, the optional rear seat infotainment (which was available on LT, RS, Premier, Redline Edition, and High Country trim levels) was discontinued on the Traverse.

Originally planned for the 2021 model year, Chevrolet gave the Traverse a refreshed look for 2022, adopting a grille similar to the redesigned Suburban/Tahoe vehicles and featuring thin LED headlights and tail lights, plus new daytime running lights with integrated LED turn signals. Also new are interior seating options, wireless Apple CarPlay and Android Auto, and a new available eight-inch infotainment display. Several safety features are now standard: Automatic Emergency Braking, Front Pedestrian Braking, Forward Collision Alert, Lane Keep Assist with Lane Departure Warning, IntelliBeam auto high beams, and a Following Distance Indicator. Advanced Adaptive Cruise Control is added to the 3LT, RS and Premier trims, while GM's Safety Alert Seat is now standard on Premier and High Country models. These changes were based on feedback from consumers.

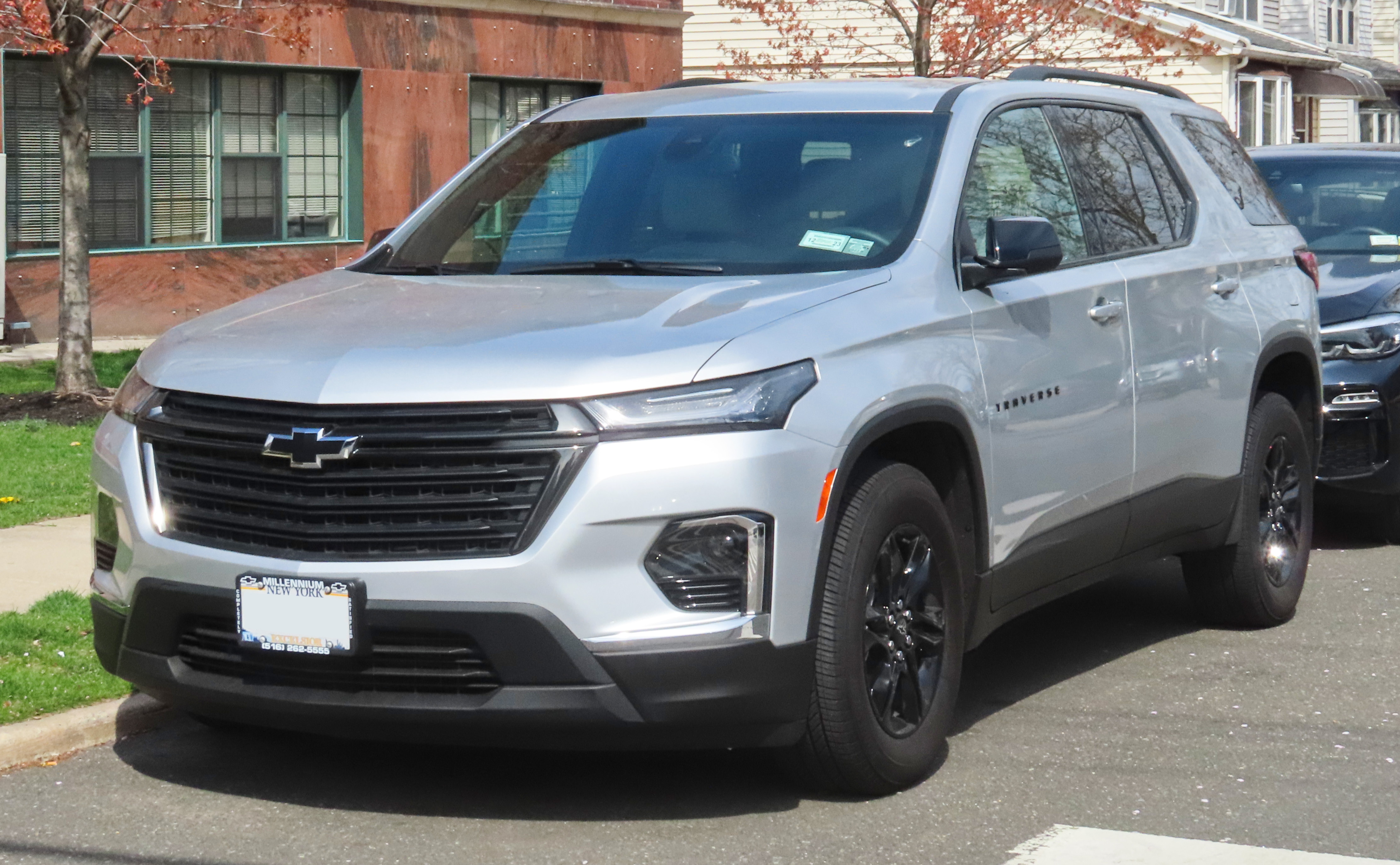
2022 Chevrolet Traverse (facelift)

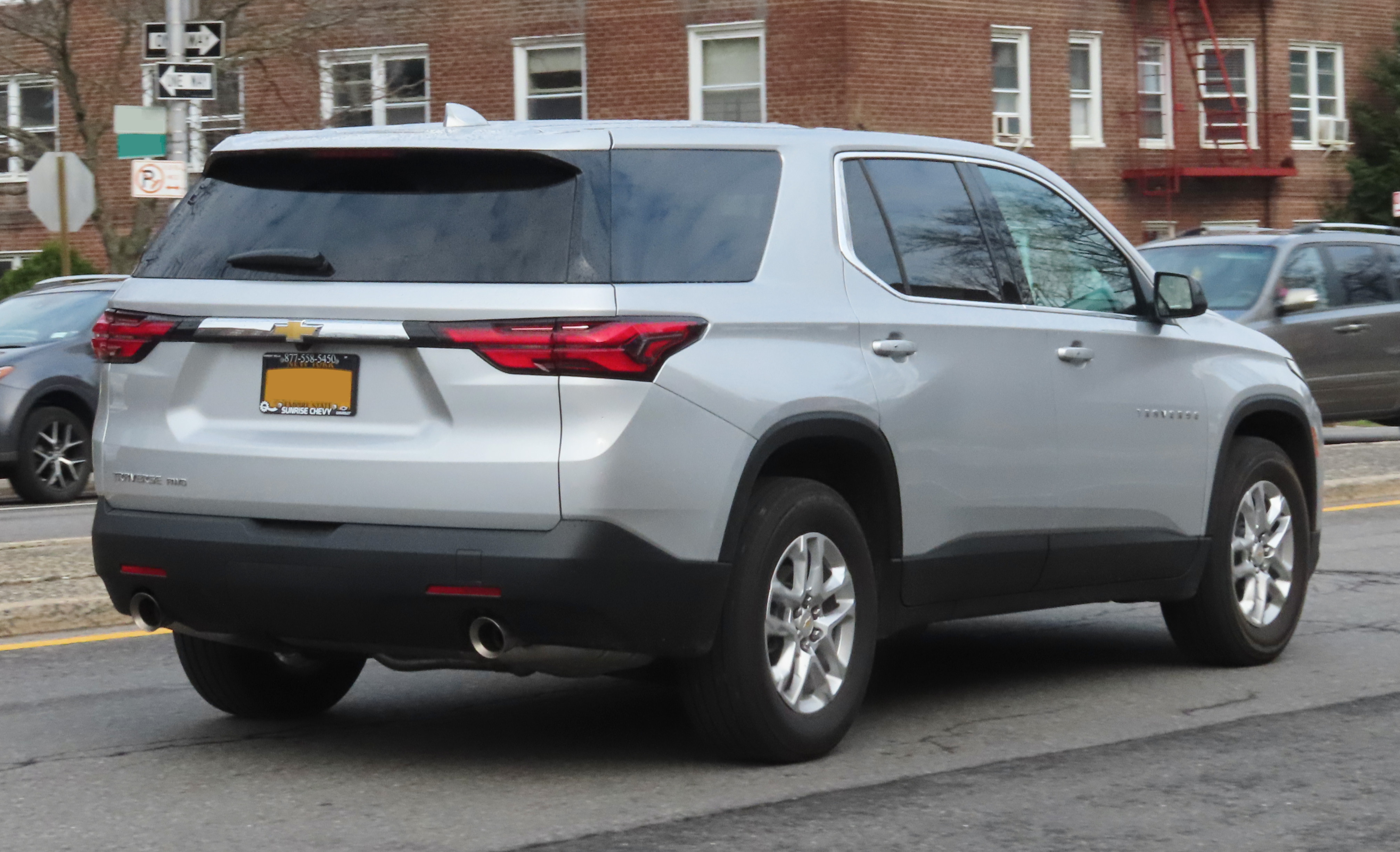
2022 Chevrolet Traverse LS (facelift)

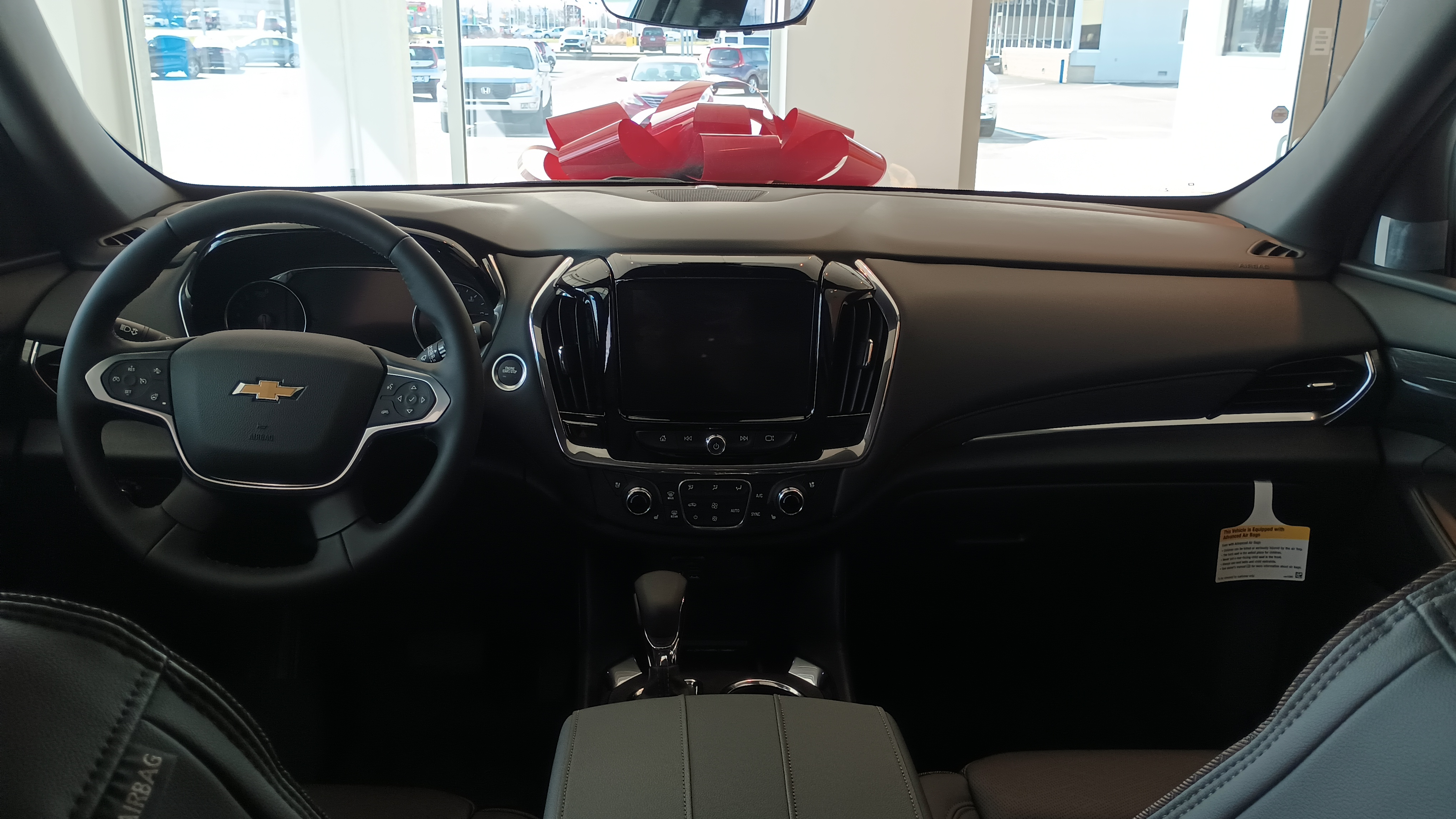
Interior (facelift)

=== Safety ===
The 2021 model year Traverse was awarded "Top Safety Pick" by IIHS. It received Good ratings in at least six crash test evaluations and earned an Acceptable rating for the headlight evaluation when equipped with the LED projector headlights on the Premier and High Country trims, other trim levels did not qualify for this rating as it was equipped with poor-rated HID projector headlights.

IIHS scores (2021)
Small overlap front (driver)	Good	
Small overlap front (passenger)	Good	
Moderate overlap front (original test)	Good	
Side (original test)	Good	
Side (updated test)	Acceptable	
Roof strength	Good	
Head restraints and seats	Good	
Headlights	Acceptable	Poor
Front crash prevention: vehicle-to-vehicle	Superior	
Front crash prevention: vehicle-to-pedestrian (Day)	Superior	Advanced
Child seat anchors (LATCH) ease of use	Acceptable	

== Third generation (2024) ==
Third generation
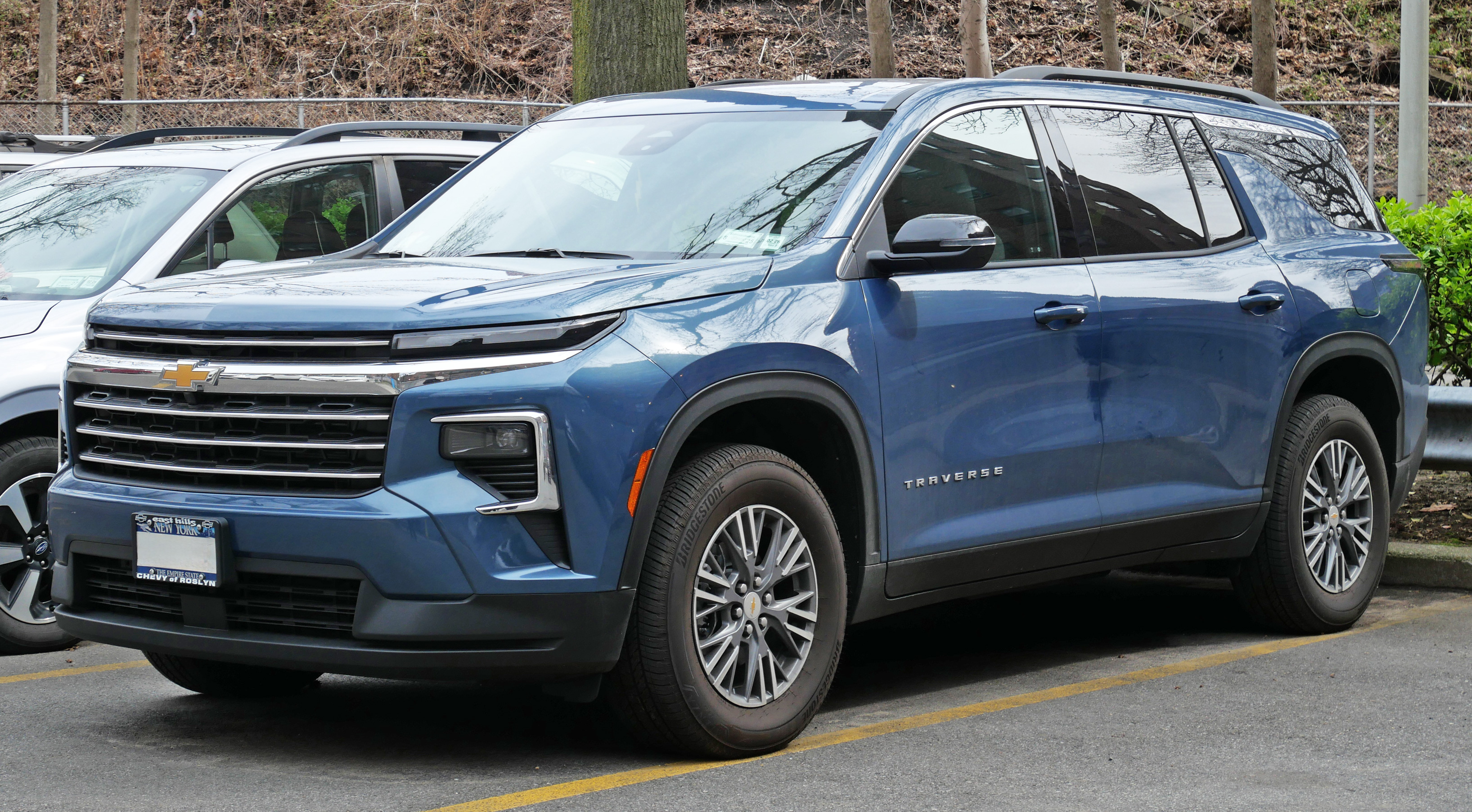

Overview
- Production: 2024–present
- Model years: 2024–present
- Assembly: United States: Lansing, Michigan (Lansing Delta Township Assembly); China: SAIC-GM

Body and chassis
- Layout: Front engine, front-wheel-drive Front engine, all-wheel-drive
- Platform: GM VSS-S (C1XX-2)
- Related: GMC Acadia; Buick Enclave

Powertrain
- Engine: 2.0 L turbo I4 hybrid (China); 2.5 L LK0 turbo I4 (North America)
- Transmission: 8-speed automatic

Dimensions
- Wheelbase: 3,070 mm (120.9 in)
- Length: 5,235 mm (206.1 in)
- Width: 2,022 mm (79.6 in)
- Height: 1,768 mm (69.6 in)
- Curb weight: ≥ 2,177 kg (4,800 lb)

Chevrolet unveiled the third-generation Traverse on July 17, 2023, with first customer deliveries commenced in April 2024 as a 2024 model year. Production of the third-generation Traverse was initially planned to commence in December 2023, but production has been delayed a few times during the first quarter of 2024.

At launch, four trim levels were available: LS, LT, RS, and Z71, and all trim levels except the AWD-only Z71 trim can be equipped with either FWD or AWD in the US market. The Premier trim will become available for the 2025 model year. The L and Redline Edition trim levels were discontinued, while the High Country trim level was unavailable for the 2025 model year, but was brought back starting with the 2026 model year. Additionally, the LS trim was discontinued, leaving LT as the base trim and making the 2026 trim lineup consisting of four trims: LT, Z71, High Country, and RS.

The exterior of the Traverse balances the design elements between a crossover SUV and a truck and features the brand's “High Brow” design language which features a truck-inspired front fascia and split headlights. There are standard LED front and rear lighting, walk-up lighting animation upon owners approaching the vehicle (available on the RS trim) and forward leaning C-Pillars.

The Z71 model features 1-inch increased ground clearance with a wider track, all-terrain tires coupled with unique-designed 18" alloy wheels, a standard trailering package, a Terrain mode for the drive mode selection, twin-clutch AWD system, unique dampers with hydraulic rebound control, and uses a different front fascia with an aluminium skid plate and signature Z71 red tow hooks.

The interior features a lower mounted 11-inch instrument cluster, 17.7-inch color touchscreen that is two times larger than the largest available screen in its predecessor, the gear lever for automatic transmission mounted on the steering wheel column and a pass-through center console.

Seating configurations for the Traverse includes: an eight-seater configuration with second and third row bench seats (standard on LS, available on LT), and a seven-seater configuration which includes second row captain seats with SmartSlide feature (standard on the LT, RS and Z71 trim levels). A One-touch folding feature for the second row seats and electrically folding third row seats are standard on the RS trim. The Traverse has a maximum cargo space of 98 cu ft (2,800 L). For the first time, the Traverse is available with an AutoSense Liftgate feature.

All Traverse models come standard with Chevy Safety Assist safety suite which includes an updated version of the Buckle to Drive feature, which requires the driver and front passenger to buckle their seatbelts before driving. There is the option of a Super Cruise hands-free advanced driving assistant feature.

All Traverse models are powered by a 2.5-liter turbocharged inline-four gasoline engine producing 328 hp (245 kW) and 326 lb⋅ft (442 N⋅m) of torque paired with an 8-speed automatic transmission in the North American market.

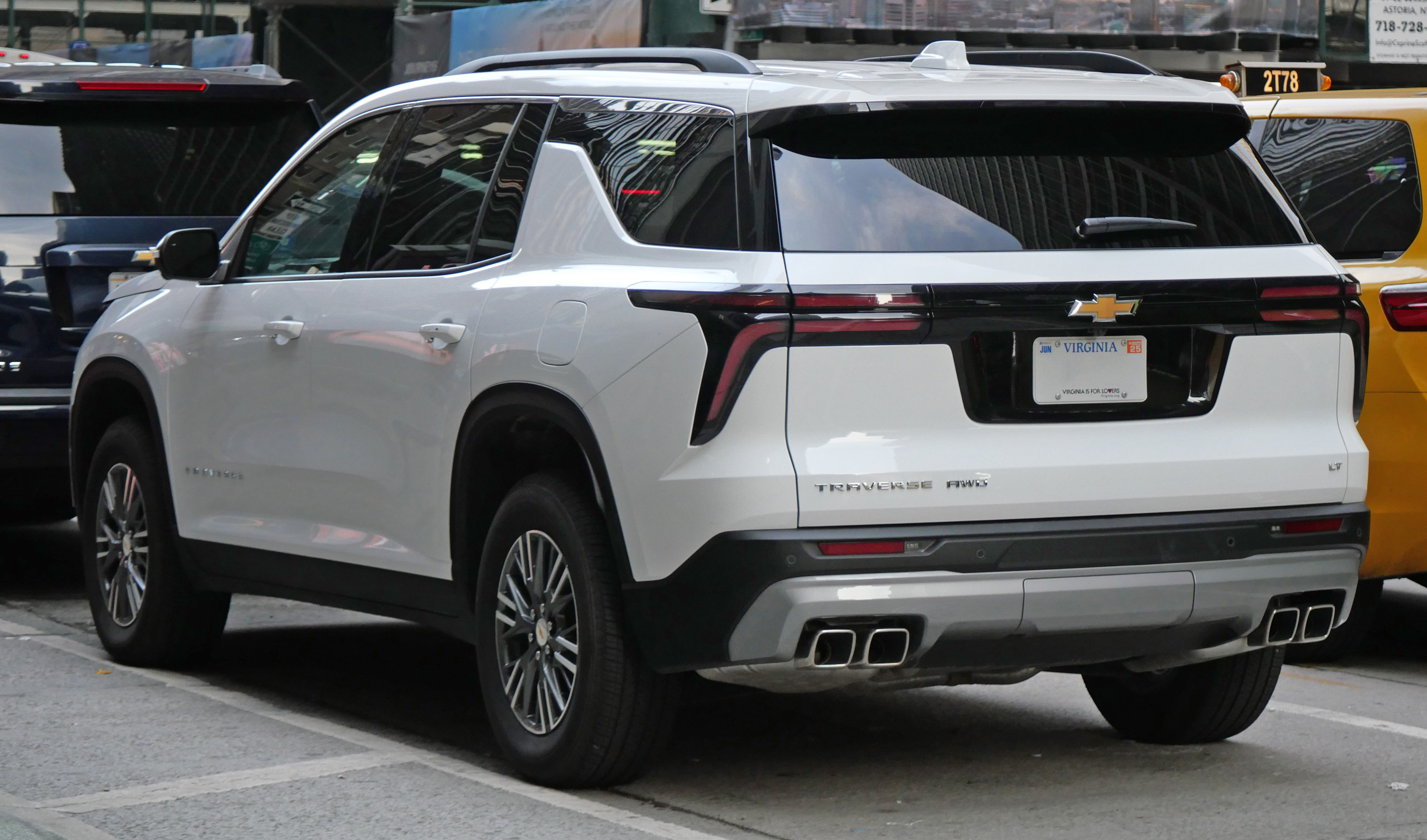
Rear view (LT)

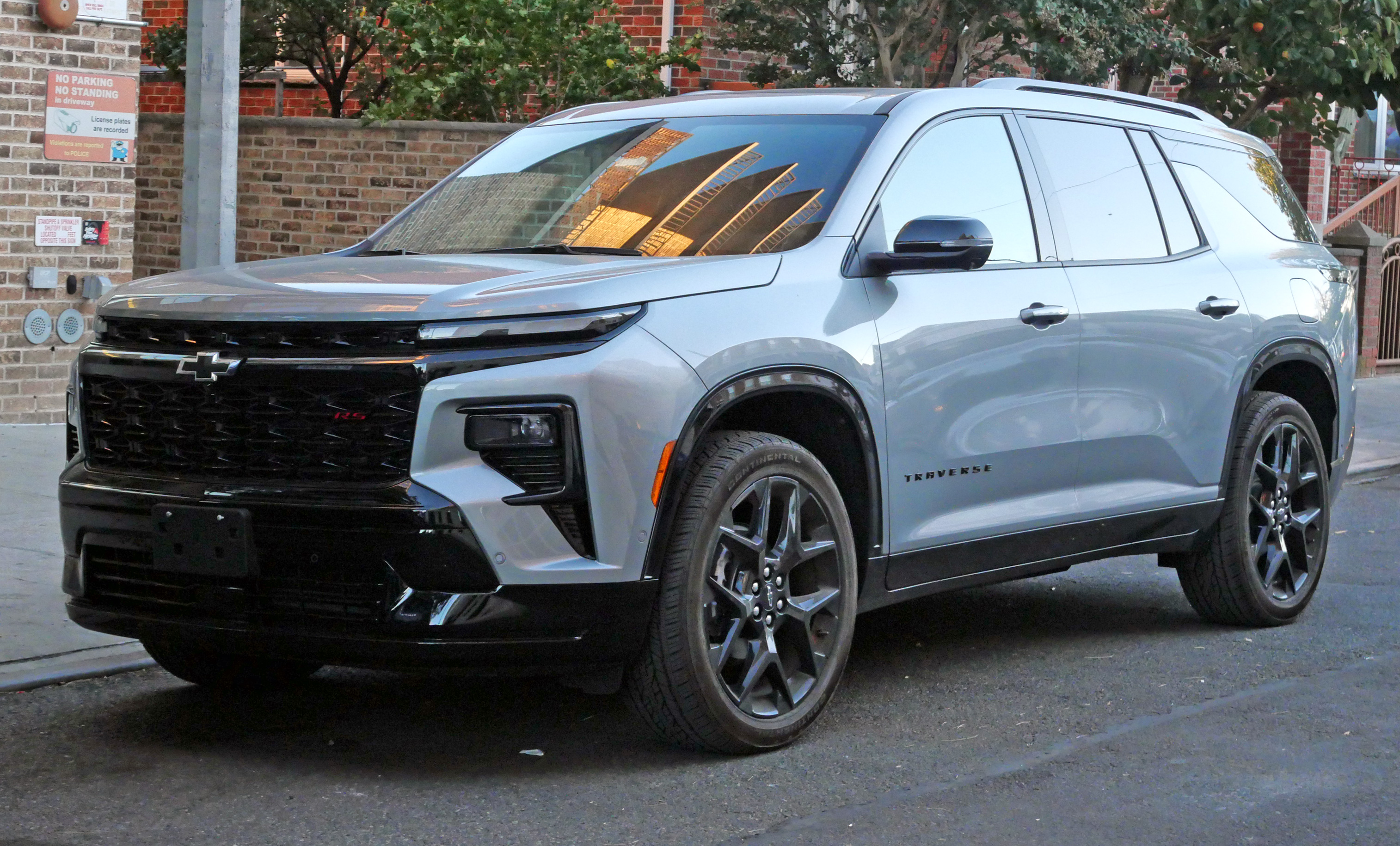
2025 Traverse RS

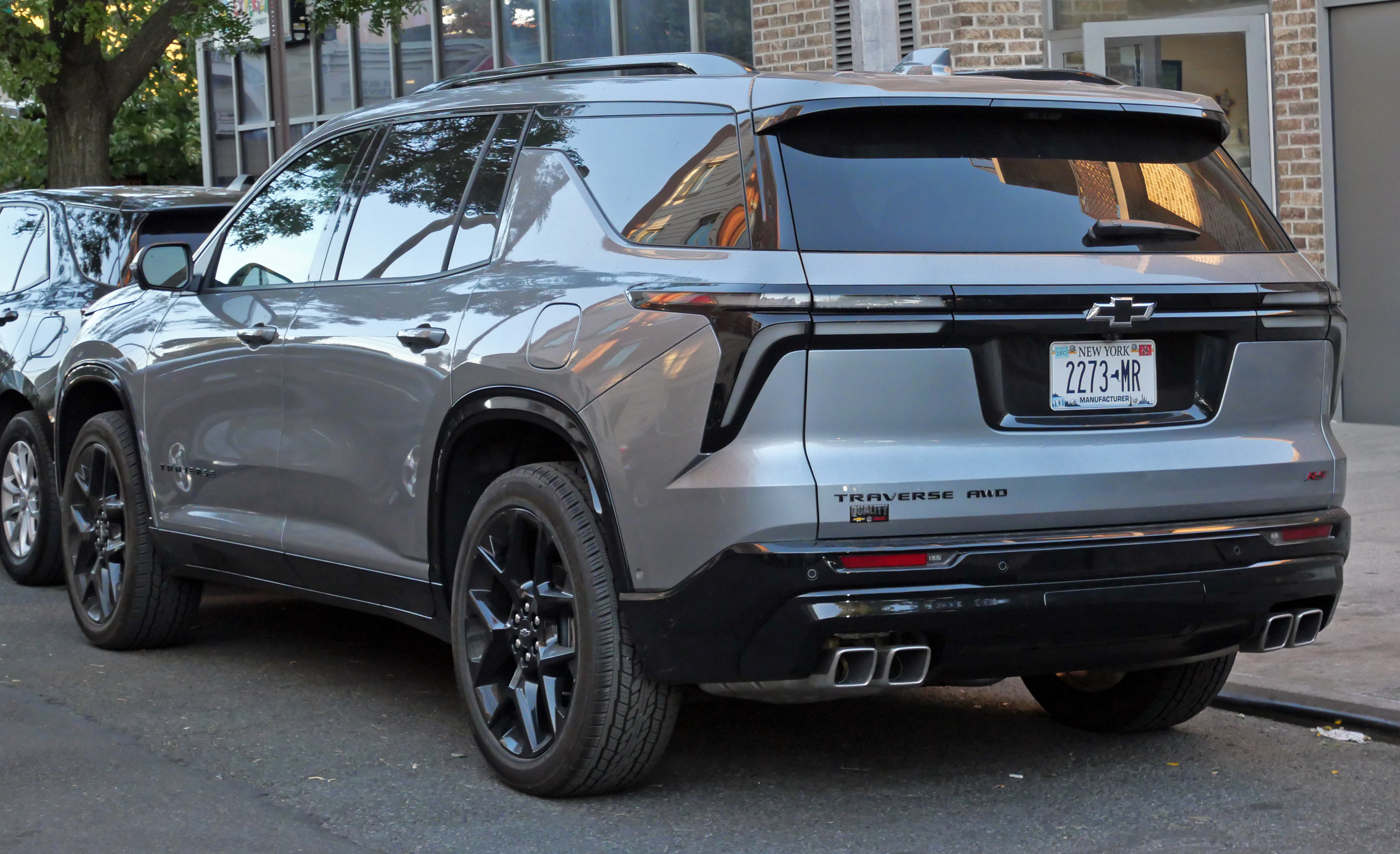
Rear view (RS)

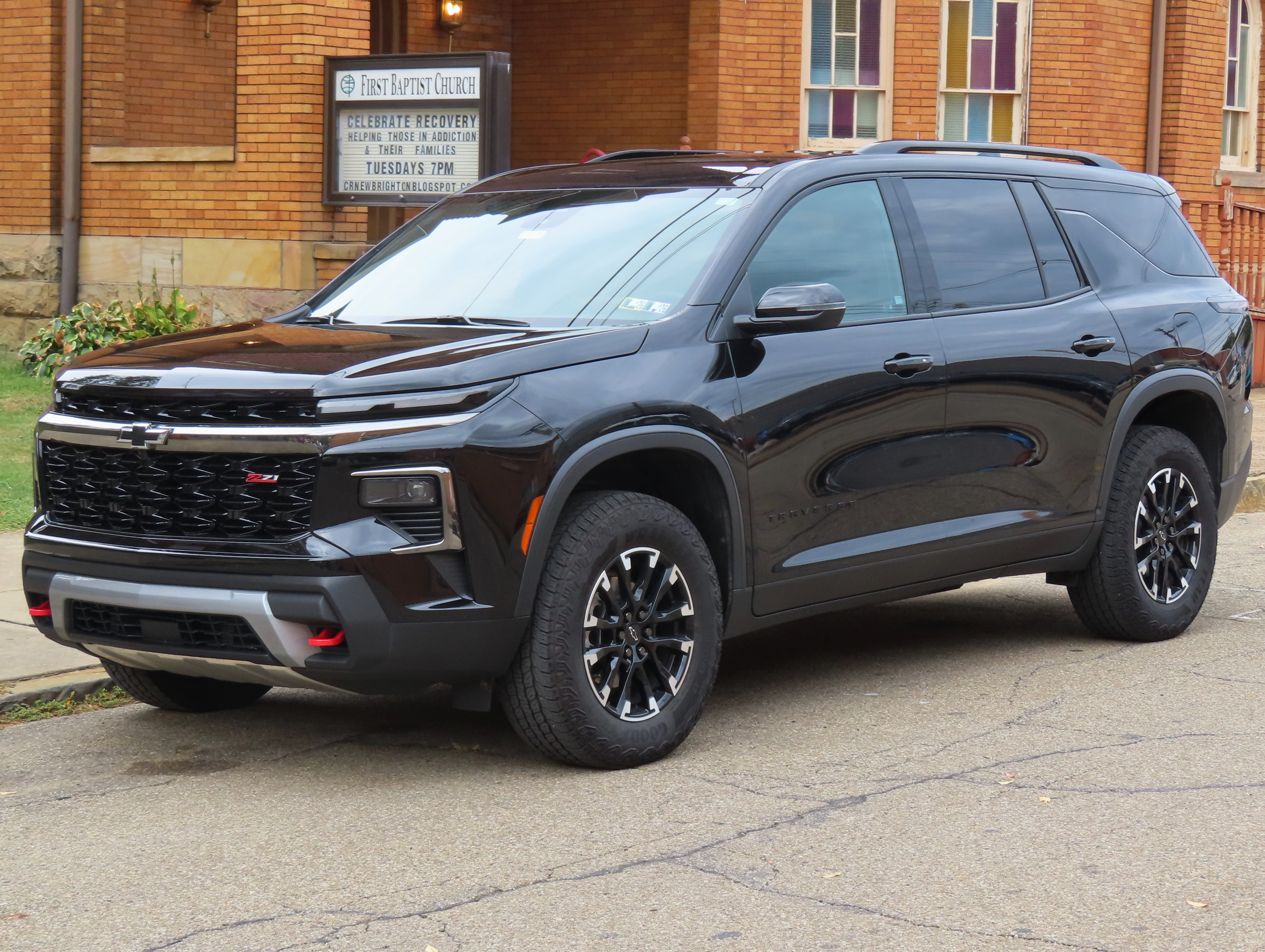
2025 Traverse Z71

=== Model year changes ===
In December 2024, for the 2025 model year, the LS trim level for the Chevrolet Traverse (which is a US-market exclusive) is discontinued, effectively making the LT trim level, the new base trim level for the Traverse in the United States. The Premier level also became available on the US and Canadian market Traverse vehicles for the 2025 model year. GM also introduced the High Country trim level for the Traverse in the US market for the 2025 model year, however the High Country trim level will not be available on the Traverse vehicles sold in Canada.

=== Markets ===
In addition to being available in the United States, Canada, Mexico, and China, the 3rd-generation Traverse will also be available in select Latin American countries, the Middle East, and the Commonwealth of Independent States (excluding Belarus and Russia).

==== Canada ====
The Canadian market Traverse will be similar to the US market version except that the LS trim level will not be available on the Canadian-market Traverse. Other differences include standard all-wheel drive, outside heated mirrors, heated front and rear outboard seats, and a heated steering wheel.

==== Mexico ====
The Mexican market Traverse officially made its debut in August 2024. The Mexican market Traverse will be available solely in the LT trim level with Front-Wheel Drive only and will be equipped with 17.7 inch infotainment system touchscreen, Chevy Safety Assist, OnStar, two-tone 20-inch wheels, full LED lighting, and panoramic moonroof. Unlike in Canada and the United States, the Traverse sold in Mexico will not be available with All-Wheel Drive (which is standard on the Canadian market Traverse and optional on the US market Traverse).

==== China ====
For the first time, the Traverse will also be available in mainland China, effectively replacing the now discontinued China-only 2nd-generation Chevrolet Orlando in Chevrolet's Chinese lineup, and will surpass the Chinese version of the Chevrolet Blazer as the largest Chevrolet vehicle sold there. The Chinese market Traverse will be available in two trim levels, Base HEV and Activ HEV (the latter is based on the Chevrolet Traverse Z71). The Traverse for the Chinese market will be manufactured locally in China by SAIC-GM and will be available exclusively with a 2.0 L turbocharged in-line four-cylinder hybrid powertrain on both trim levels for the Chinese market Traverse. GM also plans to offer the hybrid powertrain in other markets at a later date.

== Sales ==
Calendar year	US	Canada	S. Korea
2008	9,456	263	
2009	91,074	4,351	
2010	106,744	6,307	
2011	107,131	5,143	
2012	85,606	3,333	
2013	96,467	3,281	
2014	103,943	3,886	
2015	119,945	3,998	
2016	116,701	4,486	
2017	123,506	4,710	
2018	146,534	6,438	
2019	147,122	5,778	
2020	125,546	5,319	
2021	116,250	4,705	3,483
2022	96,965	3,510	1,945
2023	123,555	5,676	1,162
2024	105,835	5,158	
2025	148,278	9,481	
