= Chevrolet Blazer (crossover) =

American mid-size crossover SUV

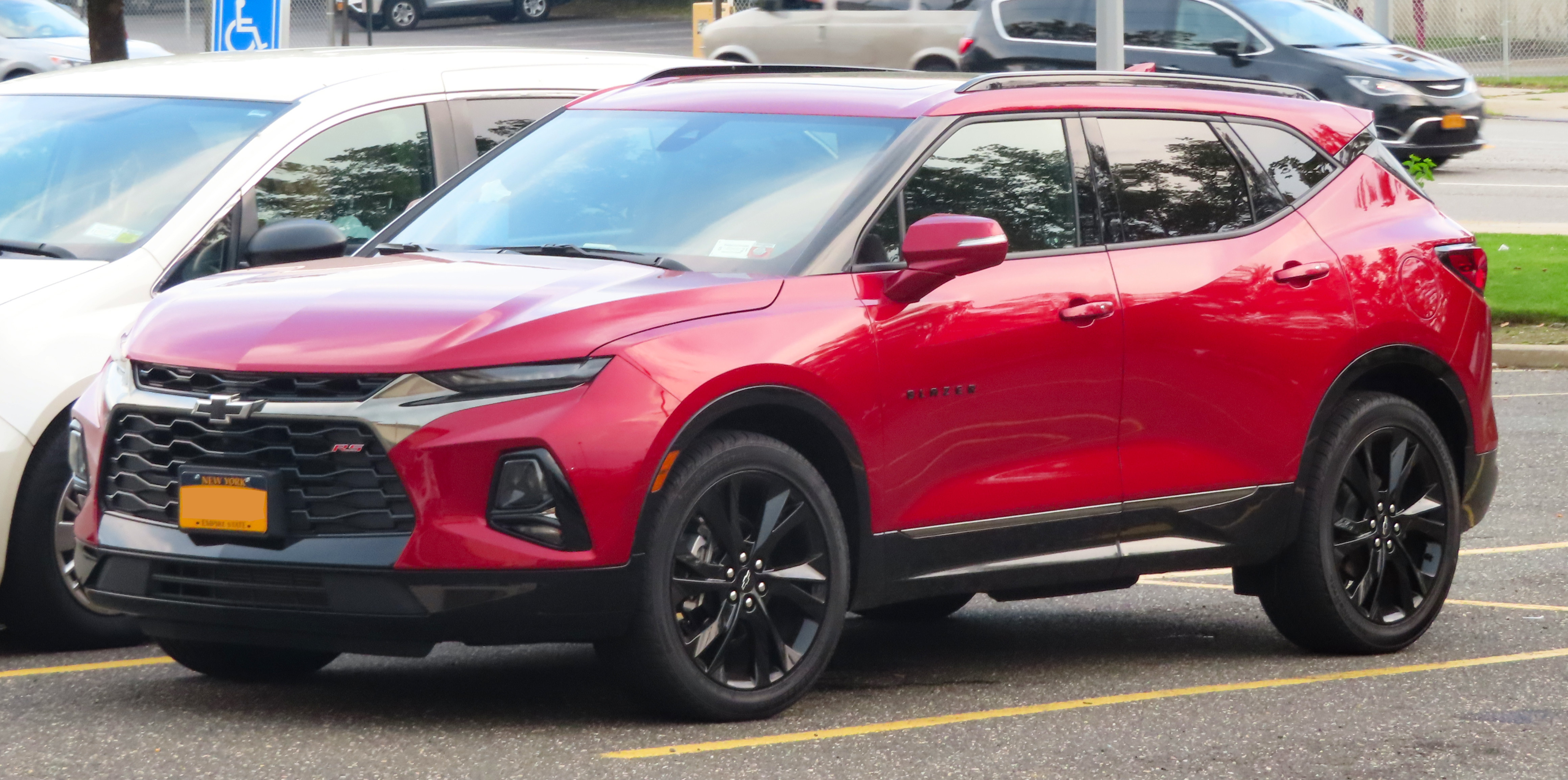
- 2019 Chevrolet Blazer RS (US)

Overview
- Manufacturer: General Motors
- Production: December 2018 – present
- Model years: 2019–present
- Assembly: Mexico: Ramos Arizpe, Coahuila (Ramos Arizpe Assembly); China: Jinqiao, Shanghai (SAIC-GM)
- Designer: Ja-wook Koo, Brian Malczewski

Body and chassis
- Class: Mid-size crossover SUV
- Body style: 5-door SUV
- Layout: Front-engine, front-wheel-drive; Front-engine, all-wheel-drive
- Platform: C1XX
- Chassis: Unibody
- Related: Chevrolet Traverse (second generation); Buick Enclave (second generation); GMC Acadia (second generation); Cadillac XT5; Cadillac XT6

Powertrain
- Engine: Gasoline: 2.0 L LSY I4 turbo (China); 2.5 L LCV I4; 3.6 L LGX V6
- Power output: 143 kW (192 hp; 194 PS) (2.5 L); 172 kW (231 hp; 234 PS) (2.0 L); 230 kW (308 hp; 313 PS) (3.6 L)
- Transmission: 9-speed 9T50, 9T65 automatic

Dimensions
- Wheelbase: 112.7 in (2,863 mm)
- Length: 191.4 in (4,862 mm); 196.8 in (4,999 mm) (China)
- Width: 76.7 in (1,948 mm); 76.9 in (1,953 mm) (China)
- Height: 67.0 in (1,702 mm); 68.3 in (1,736 mm) (China)
- Curb weight: 3,810 lb (1,728 kg); 4,145–4,409 lb (1,880–2,000 kg) (China)

The Chevrolet Blazer is a mid-size crossover SUV produced by General Motors under the Chevrolet marque. The vehicle went into production in December 2018 and sales began in January 2019 as a 2019 model. In China, a version with longer rear section and optional three-row seating is offered, which debuted in 2019 and went on sale in April 2020.

== Overview ==
The Blazer was introduced to the public in Atlanta on June 21, 2018 as a mid-size crossover SUV that slots between the compact Equinox and the three-row, full-size Traverse. It serves as a counterpart to the GMC Acadia in the mid-size crossover SUV segment and is built on the same platform as the Acadia. The vehicle's design has a sporty look that takes its cues from the Camaro but has a crossover SUV feel.

The Blazer nameplate history dates back to 1969 when it was introduced as a two-door large SUV. As the result, the use of the Blazer nameplate on a crossover has sparked mixed reactions, mostly from fans of the K5 Blazer, S-10 Blazer and TrailBlazer, who were disappointed of GM's decision to apply it to a crossover instead of a body-on-frame SUV, citing the Blazer's history as an adventurous off-road vehicle. The Trailblazer nameplate returned to North America as a compact crossover that slots below the Equinox in 2020 as a 2021 model.

== Powertrain ==
The Blazer launched with two engine options: a standard 2.5 L I4 engine rated at 144 kW (193 hp; 196 PS) and 255 N⋅m (188 lbf⋅ft) of torque, and a 3.6 L V6 engine, rated at 227.5 kW (305 hp; 309 PS) and 365 N⋅m (269 lbf⋅ft) of torque. Both engines were paired with GM's 9-speed 9T50 automatic transmission. The same transmission is also used in the company's Cruze, Malibu, and Equinox models. For 2020, a 2.0 L turbocharged I4 engine was added to the lineup.

== Trim levels ==
When the Blazer went on sale in January 2019, it featured either FWD and AWD, with a choice of L, LT (1LT, 2LT, and 3LT), RS, and Premier trim levels. Since then, the L and 1LT trim levels have been dropped.

Standard features on all Blazer models include the Chevrolet Infotainment 3 system with eight-inch touchscreen and Apple CarPlay and Android Auto smartphone integration, OnStar with 4G LTE Wi-Fi capabilities, keyless entry with keyless access and push-button start, and alloy wheels. Options include remote start, upgraded alloy wheels, a Bose premium audio system, GPS navigation, SiriusXM Satellite Radio, a power sunroof, heated and ventilated front bucket seats with driver's memory, red interior accents (RS trim only), and a power tailgate.

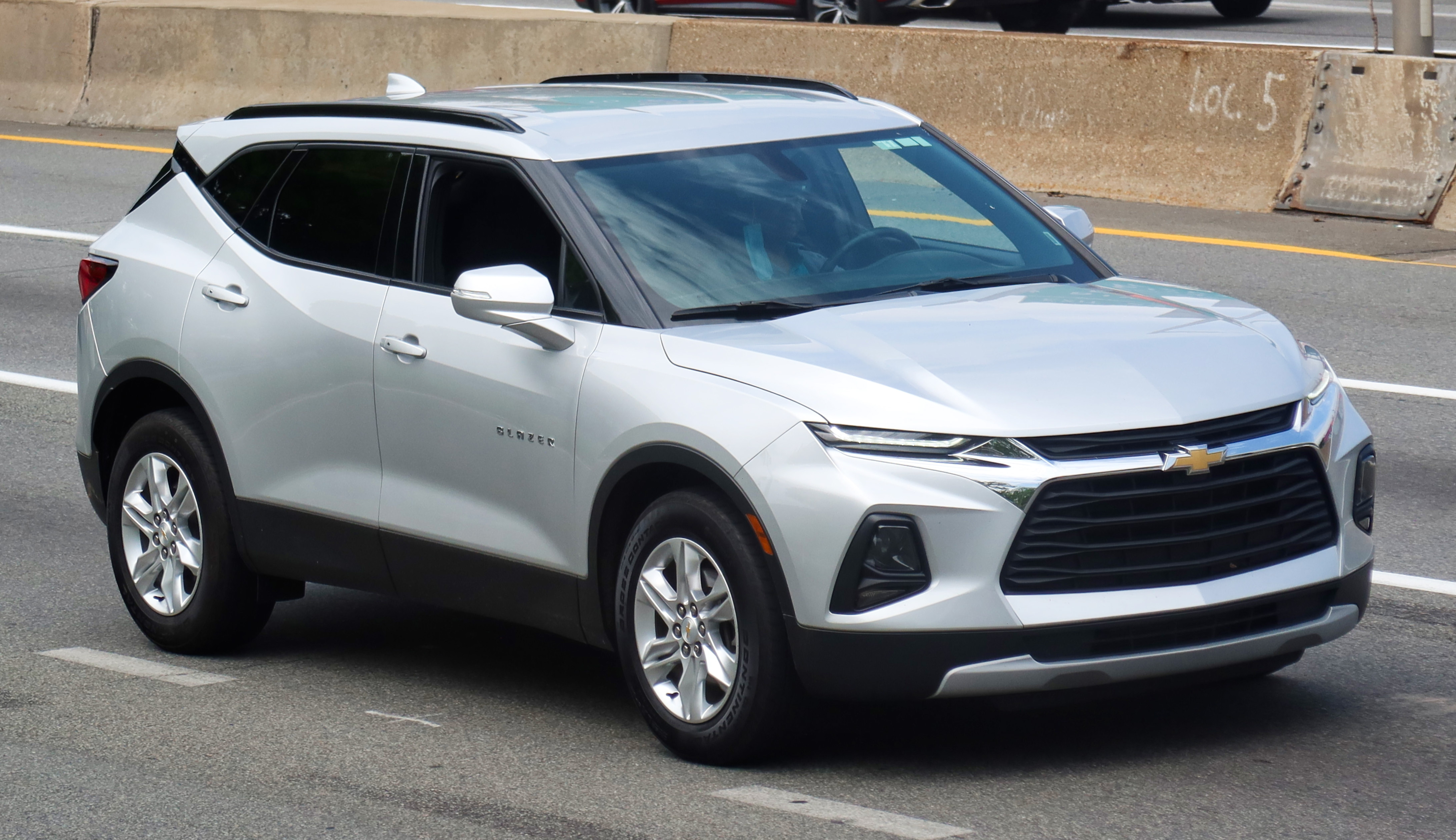
2020 Chevrolet Blazer 2LT AWD (US)

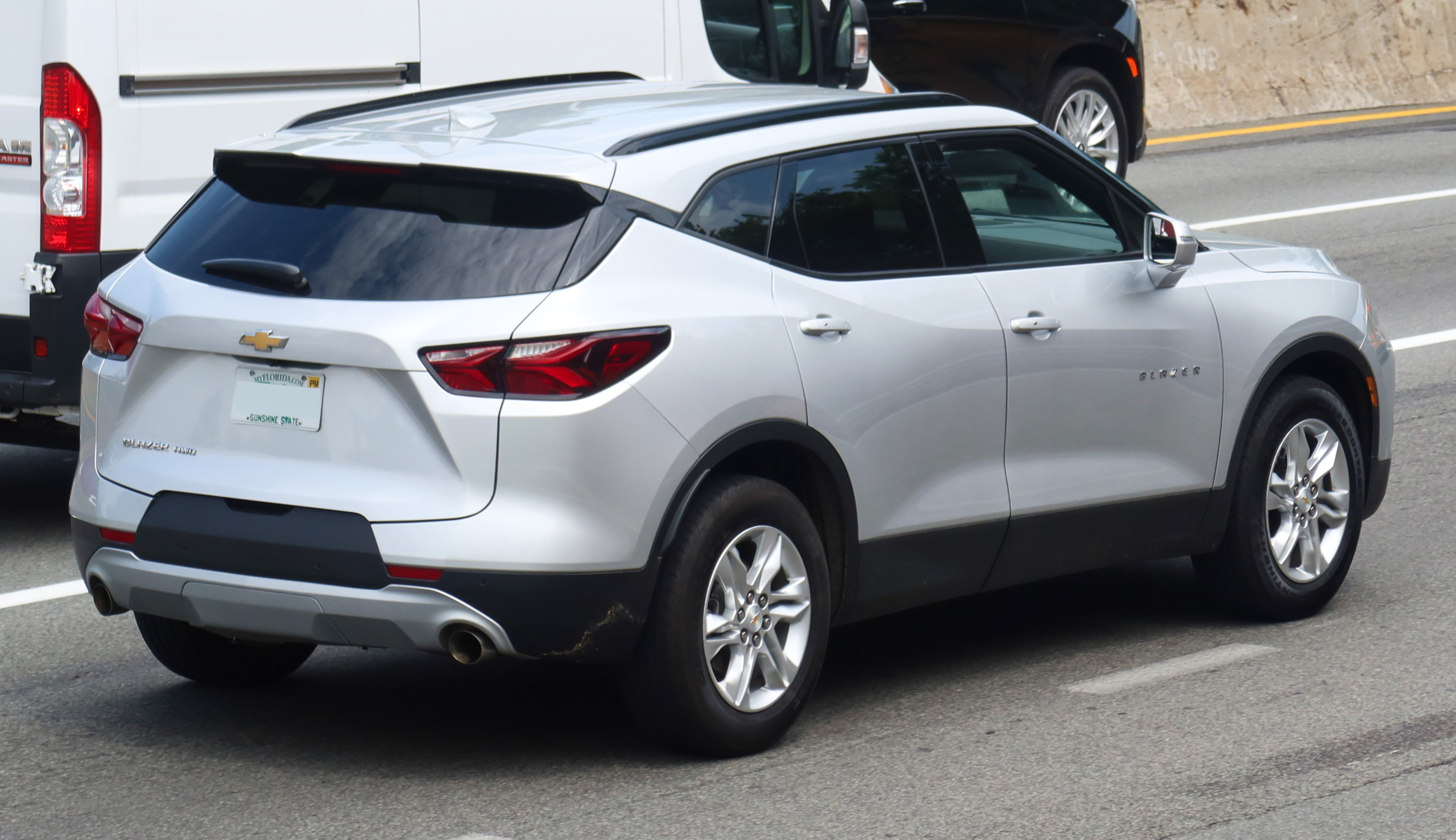
2020 Chevrolet Blazer 2LT AWD (US)

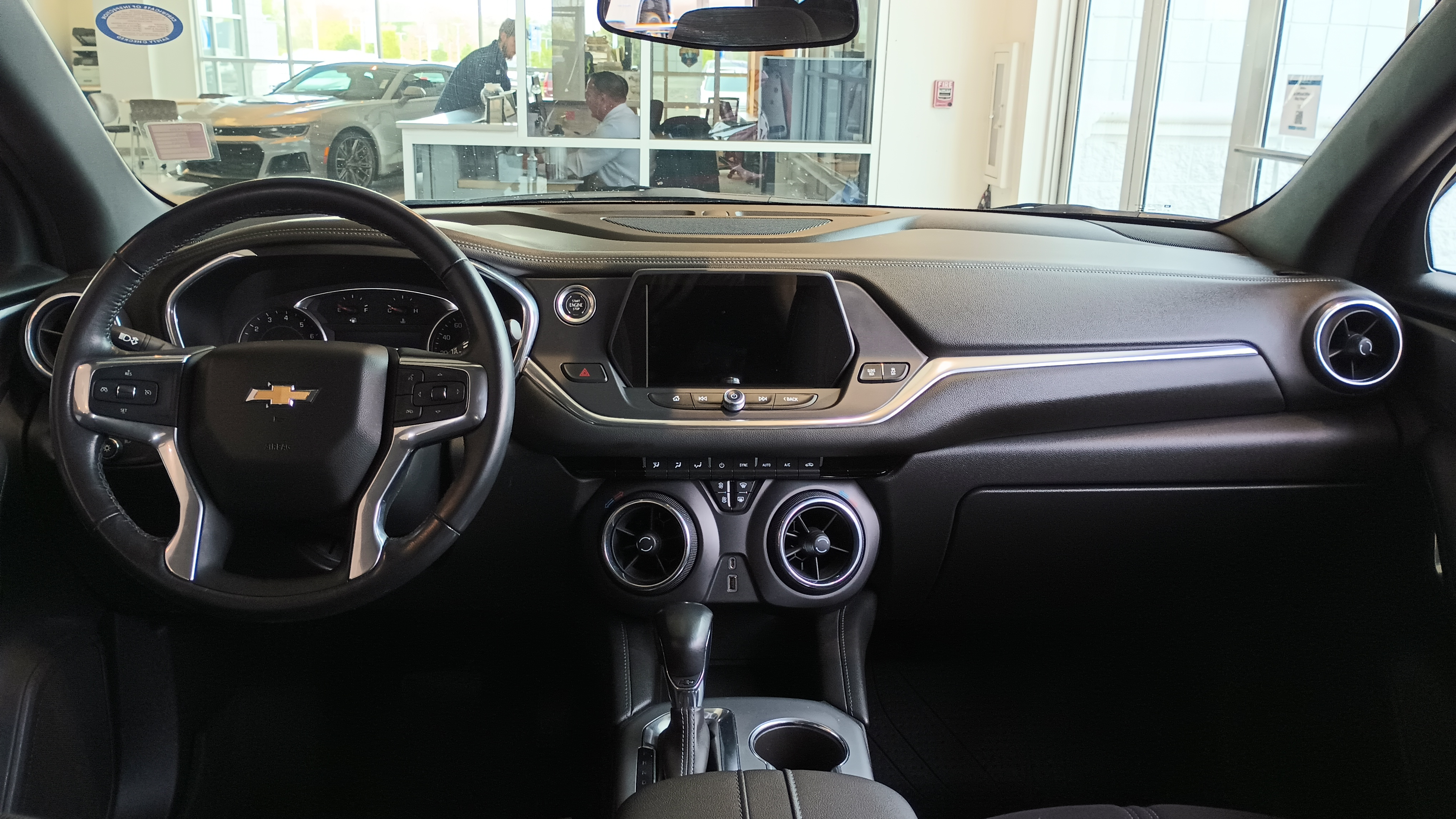
2019 Chevrolet Blazer 1LT interior (US)

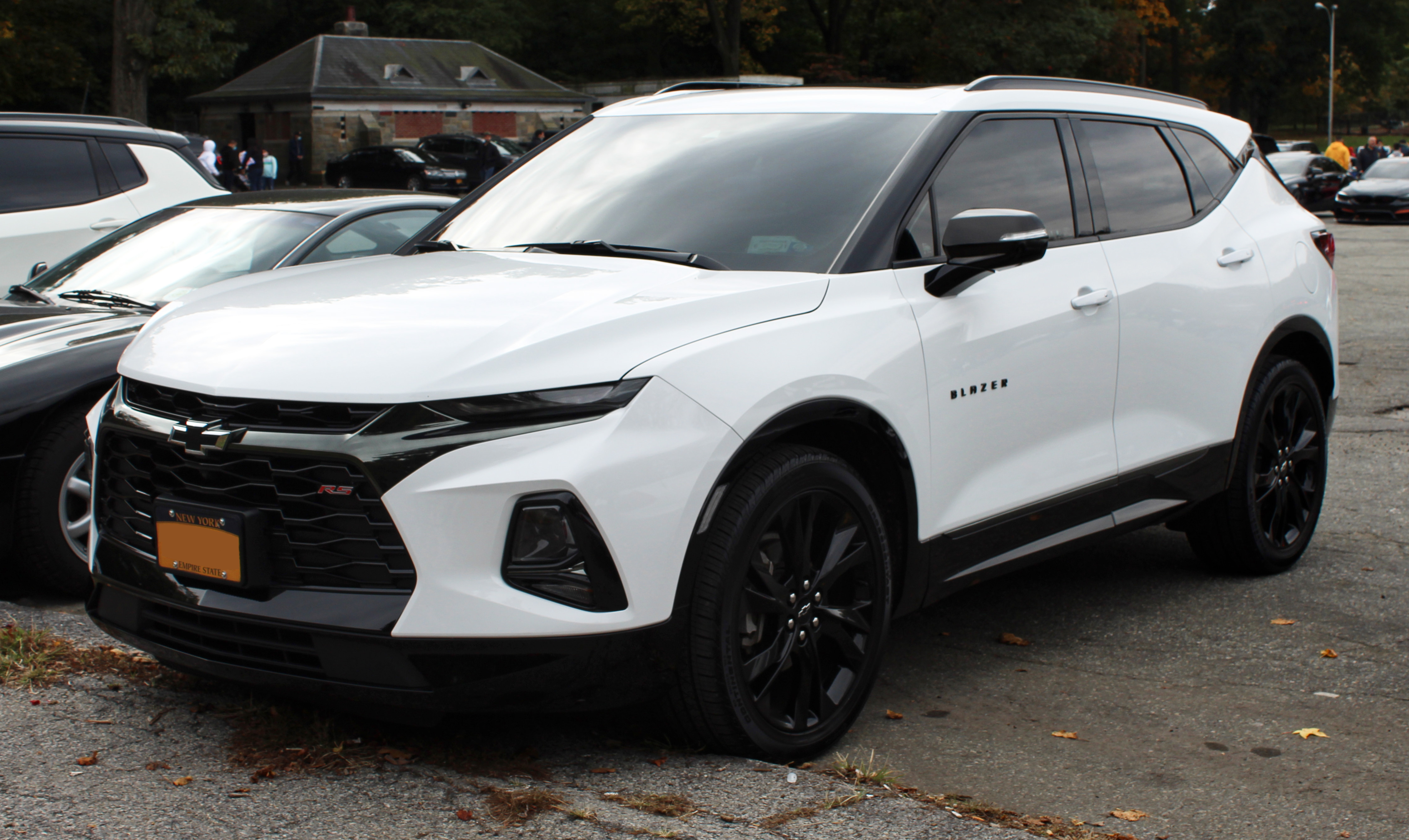
2020 Chevrolet Blazer RS (US)

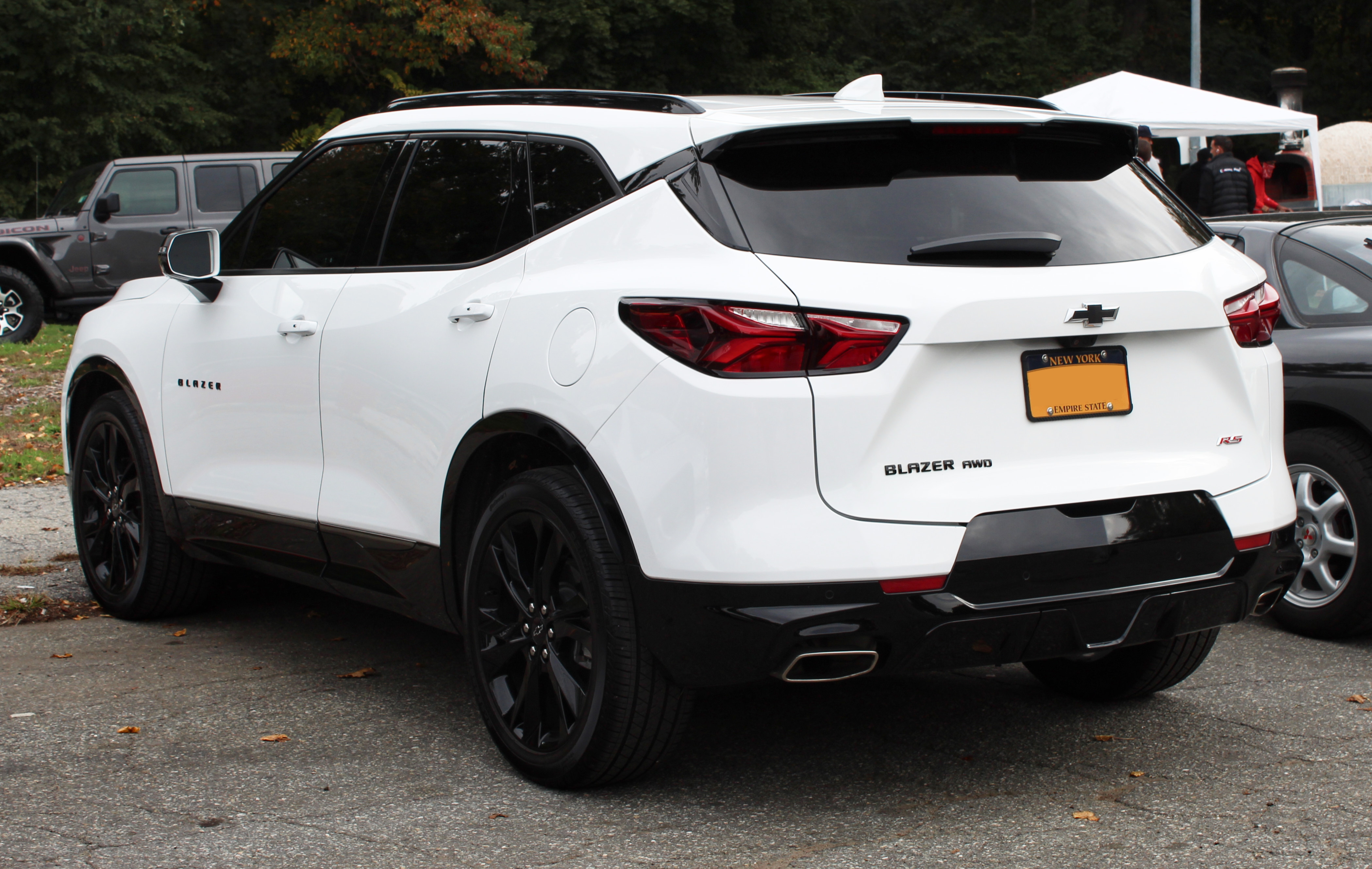
2020 Chevrolet Blazer RS (US)

== Model year changes ==
=== 2020 ===
The 2020 model year Blazer saw a 2.0L turbocharged 4 cylinder LSY engine added as an option on 2LT and 3LT level trims.

=== 2021 ===
The 2021 model year Blazer offers a new towing package called the VR2 Trailering Package on models equipped with front-wheel-drive and the 3.6L V6 LGX engine. The optional package includes the same cooling system as the aforementioned similar V92 package available on AWD models and is expected to increase the maximum towing capacity of front-drive models to 4500 pounds, the same as on the AWD model. Four new colors were also added, while three were dropped. Pewter metallic, iron gray, cayenne orange, and cherry red tintcoat were all new for 2021, while nightfall gray metallic, graphite metallic, and cajun red tintcoat were discontinued. The standard leather-wrapped steering wheel was replaced with a urethane steering wheel on the L, 1LT, and 2LT trim levels. The twin-clutch AWD system was removed from the Premier trim, and is now only exclusively offered on the RS trim level, while all the other models get a regular AWD system (without the twin-clutch setup).

=== 2022 ===
The Blazer L and 1LT trim levels were dropped—these models were only available with FWD and the 2.5L inline-4 LCV engine. This marks the discontinuation of the 2.5L inline-4 engine for the Blazer lineup, as this engine is not offered with any other Blazer configurations.

=== 2023 facelift ===
In February 2022, for the 2023 model year, Chevrolet announced a facelift for the Blazer. Changes on the exterior include revised LED headlights and tail lights, new grille design, and new 18, 20, and 21-inch wheel designs. Additionally, new colors available include Fountain Blue, Sterling Gray Metallic, Copper Bronze Metallic, and Radiant Red Tintcoat. On the interior, all trims come standard with a larger 10-inch infotainment screen (up from 8 inches on the pre-facelift version). Qi wireless charging is now standard on the RS and Premier trims, while it will become available on all other trims. RS models are available with a new Nightshift Blue interior color. Adaptive cruise control is now available on the 2LT and 3LT trim levels and the Chevy Safety Assist package becomes standard.

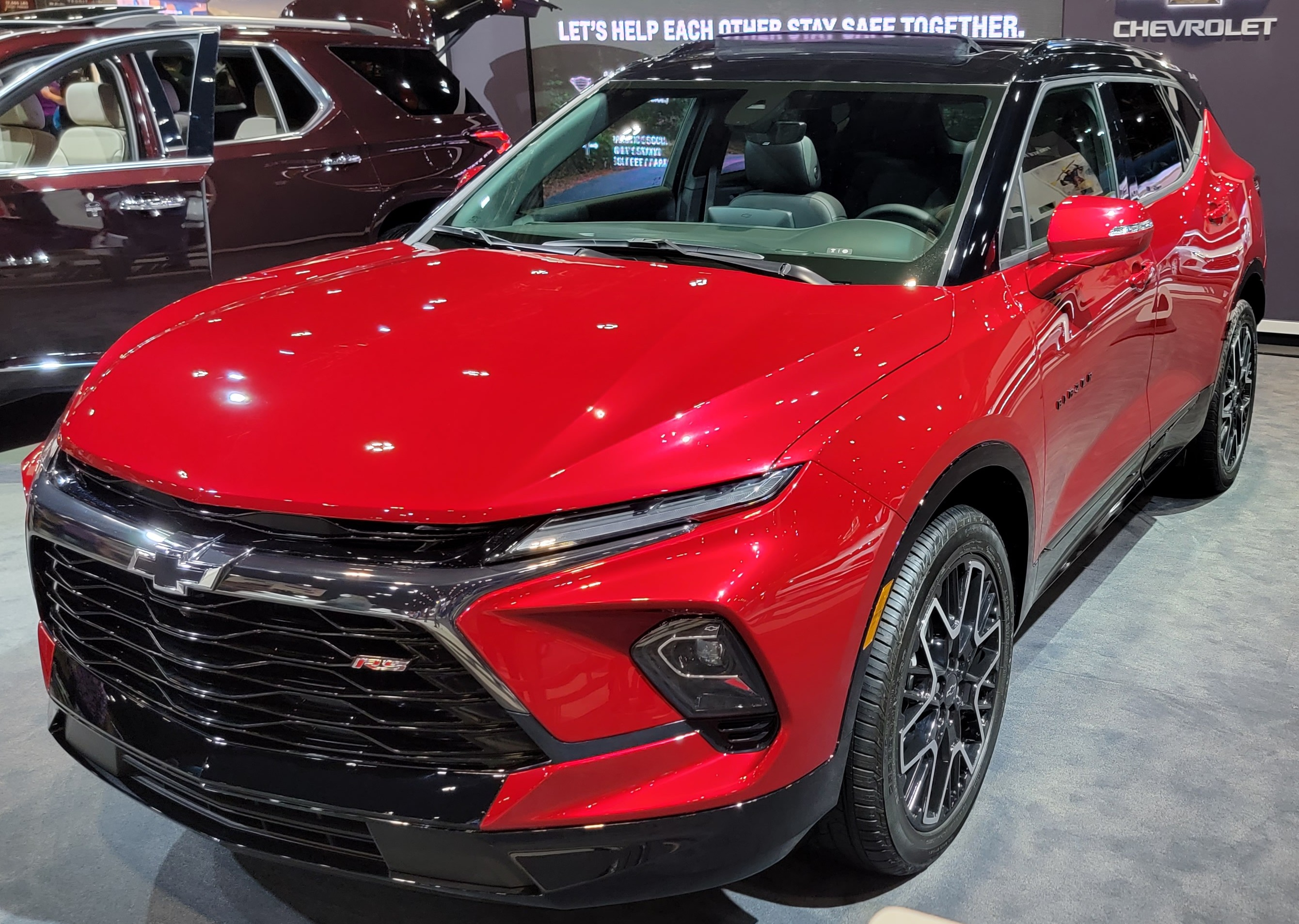
2023 Blazer RS

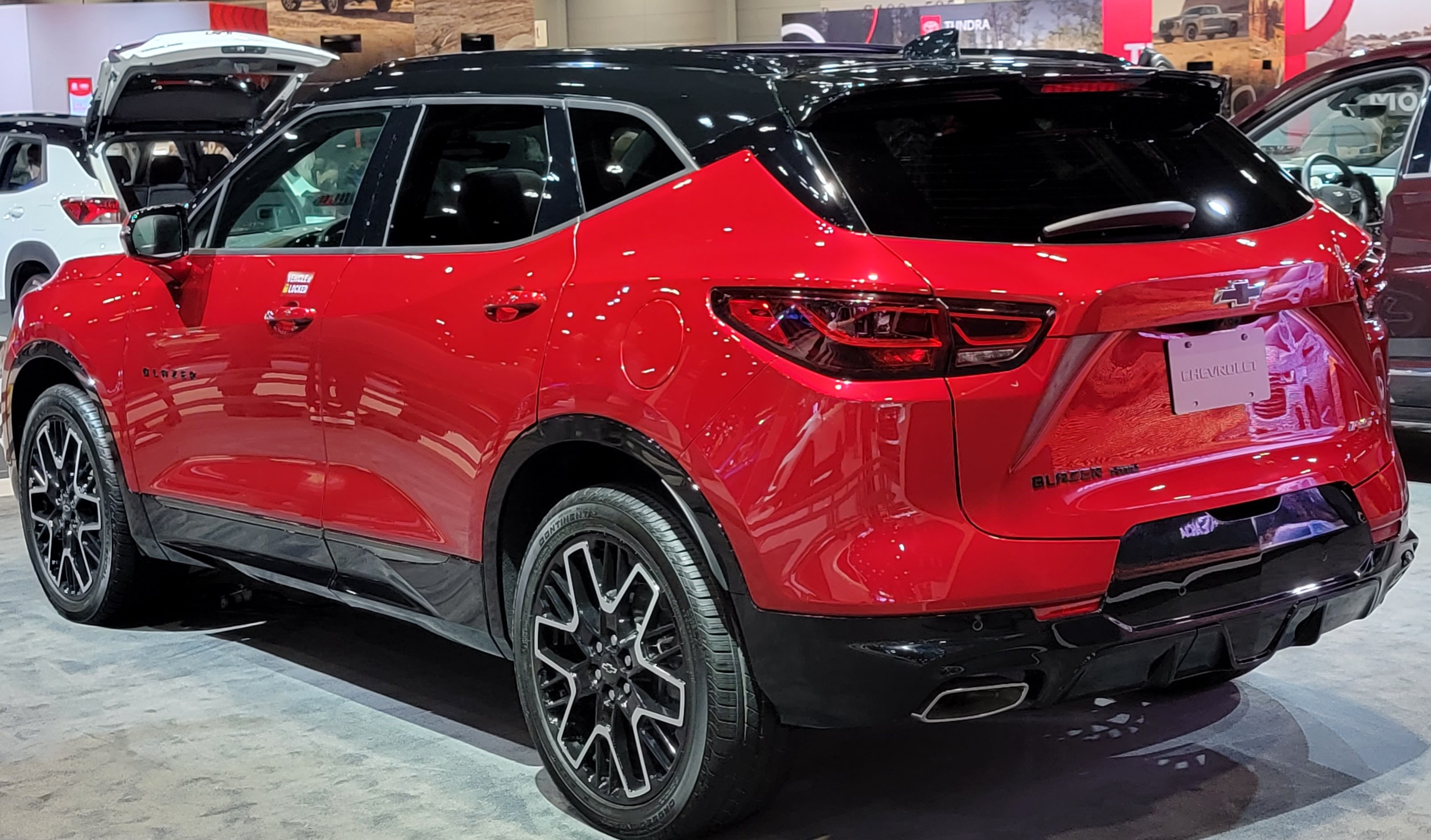
2023 Blazer RS rear

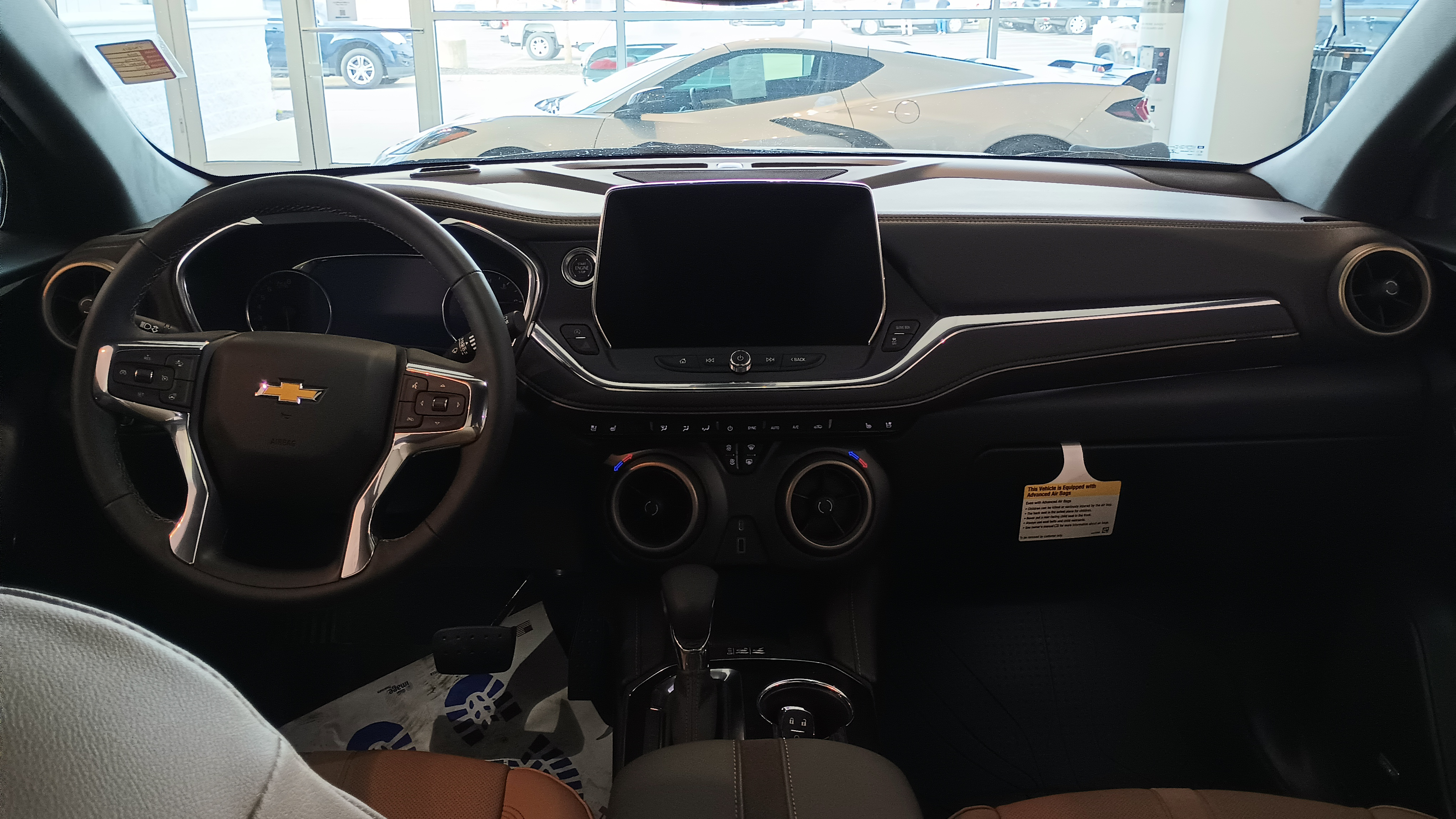
2023 Blazer Premier interior

== Markets ==
=== Mexico ===
The Blazer was introduced in Mexico in February 2019. Trim levels available are Tela (which replaces the L), Piel (which replaces the Premier), and RS which differs in equipment list compared to the RS sold in the U.S. and Canada.

=== South America ===
GM marketed the Blazer in South American markets, with Argentina, Chile and Colombia since 2019 as part of its lineup expansion in the region. However, it hasn't been released in Argentina yet.

=== Oceania ===
GM was looking at expanding the Blazer to Australia and New Zealand as a Holden, up until GM’s decision to eliminate the Holden brand in 2020. It would have been slotted as a mid-size entry between the Acadia and Equinox.

=== Asia/Middle East ===
GM began selling the Blazer in GCC markets in June 2019 with similar features as the North American version.

== Chinese version ==
The Chinese version of the Blazer was previewed as the FNR-CarryAll concept in November 2018 at Auto Guangzhou in China. On November 8, 2019, GM introduced the production version of the Chinese-market Blazer (Chinese: 开拓者; pinyin: kāi tà zhě; lit. 'pioneer') during the 2019 Chevrolet Gala Night event held in Hefei, China featuring increased length and height to accommodate three rows of seating. It serves as Chevrolet's flagship SUV in China with three trim levels available: standard, RS, and Redline. Pre-sales began in March 2020, while production at Jinqiao Assembly began in April 2020 with deliveries starting by mid-year. In addition to the three-row seating layout version of the Chinese market Blazer, GM is also offering a two-row version of the Chinese Blazer with the same dimensions as the three-row version.

Contrary to rumors that it would be called the "Blazer XL" in North America, GM will not market the Chinese three row Blazer in the region due to product overlap with the Traverse. It was also confirmed that the Chinese three-row Blazer will not be available in South Korea, meaning the three-row Chevrolet Blazer is a China-only model.

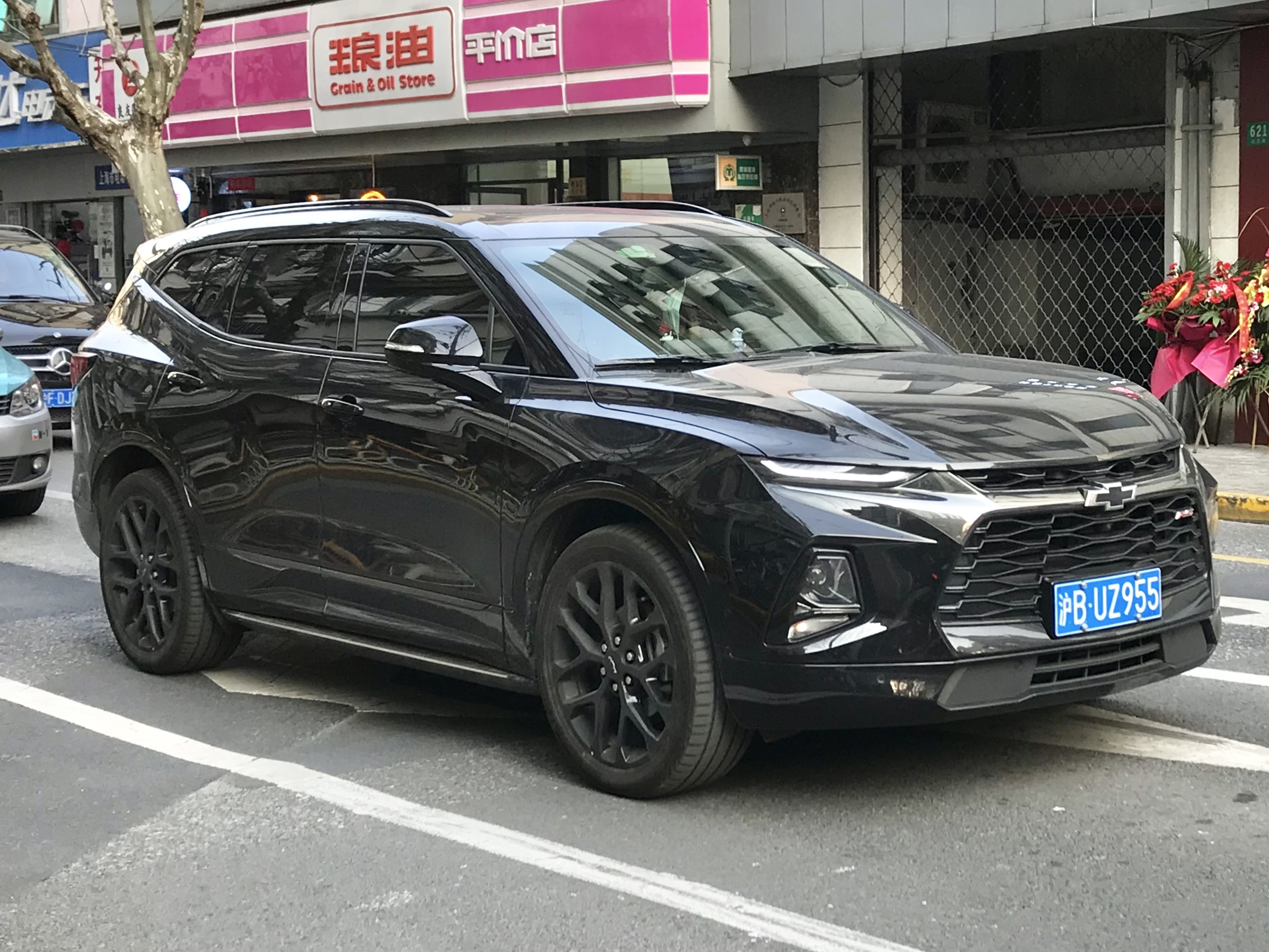
Front view

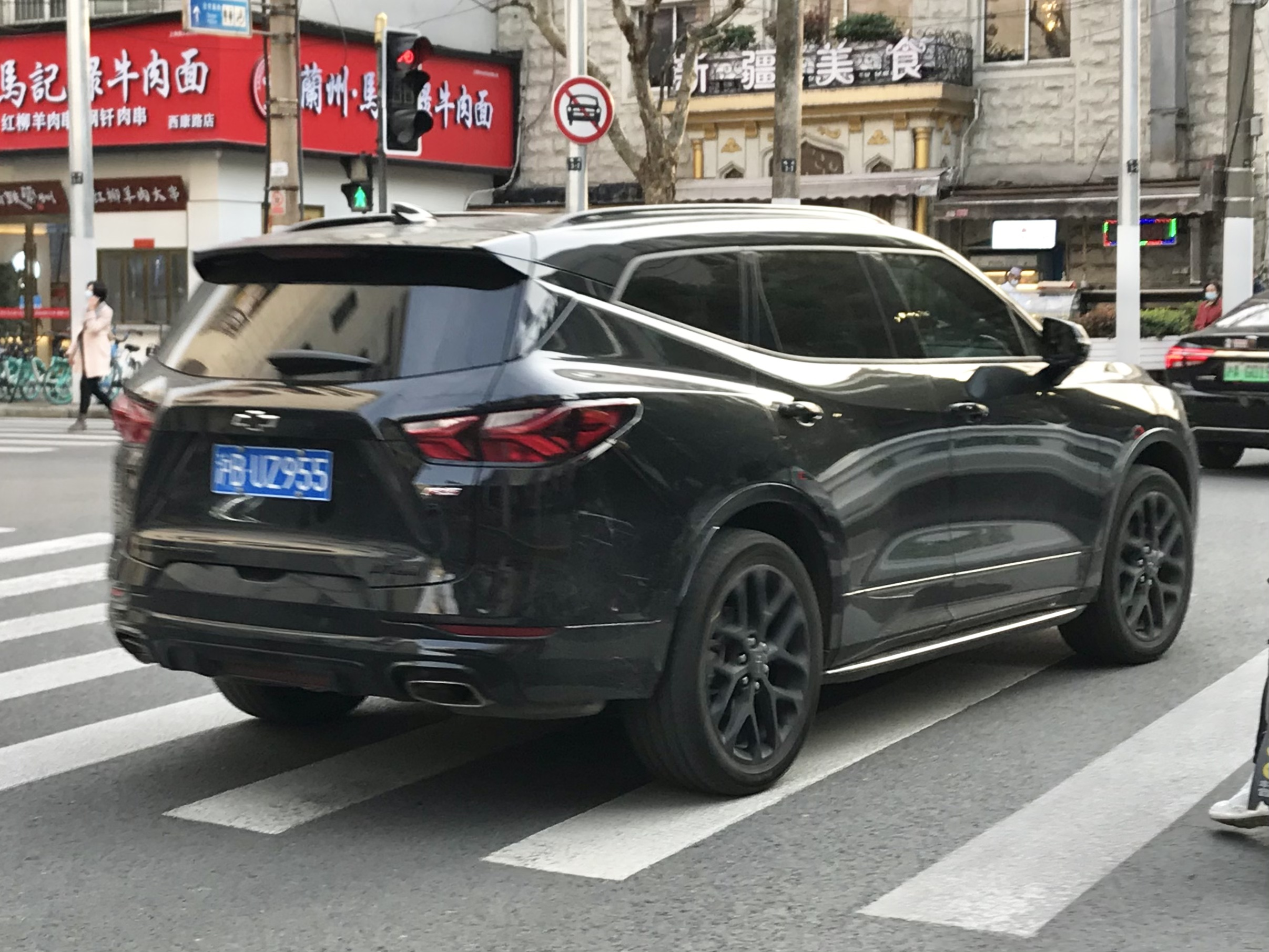
Rear view

== Safety ==
The 2022 Blazer was tested by the IIHS:

IIHS scores
| Small overlap front (Driver) | Good | |
| Small overlap front (Passenger) | Good | |
| Moderate overlap front | Good | |
| Side (original test) | Good | |
| Roof strength | Good | |
| Head restraints and seats | Good | |
| Headlights | Marginal / Poor | varies by trim/option |
| Front crash prevention (Vehicle-to-Vehicle) | Superior | optional |
| Front crash prevention (Vehicle-to-Vehicle) | Superior | standard |
| Front crash prevention (Vehicle-to-Pedestrian, day) | Advanced | optional |
| Front crash prevention (Vehicle-to-Pedestrian, day) | Advanced | standard |
| Child seat anchors (LATCH) ease of use | Acceptable | |

== Production and assembly ==
GM chose the Ramos Arizpe Assembly in Mexico because its Spring Hill facilities were at full capacity. On November 27, 2018, Chevrolet began production on the Blazer in Ramos Arizpe, phasing out production of the US-discontinued Chevrolet Cruze altogether. The latter ended its North American production in March 2019.

== Sales ==
The first 27 units of the Blazer were sold in the US in December 2018.

| Calendar year | United States | Canada | China | Mexico |
|---|---|---|---|---|
| 2019 | 58,115 | 2,738 | 1,412 | |
| 2020 | 94,599 | 3,861 | 7,144 | 1,028 |
| 2021 | 70,325 | 3,421 | 7,427 | 930 |
| 2022 | 67,246 | 3,508 | 3,312 | 1,160 |
| 2023 | 65,511 | 4,045 | 3,997 | 866 |
| 2024 | 52,576 | 3,983 | 1,546 | |
| 2025 | 46,531 | 2,610 | 86 | |

== Reception ==
In a side-by-side comparison with the Ford Edge, Car and Driver declared the Blazer the best, for its "responsive and stable handling, aggressive styling, and stout V-6 engine."
