= Cadillac XT6 =

Full-size luxury crossover SUV

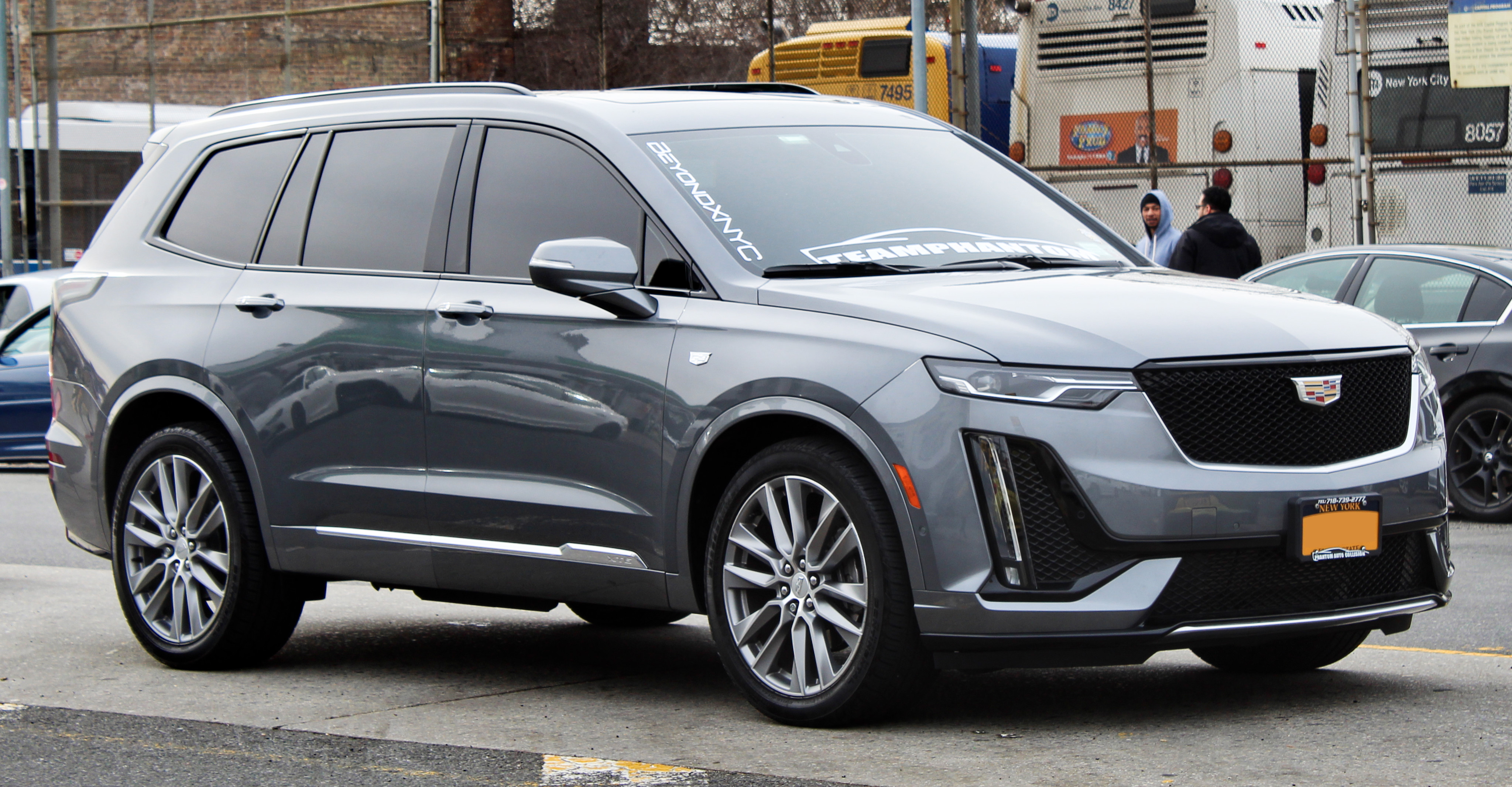

Overview
- Manufacturer: General Motors
- Production: 2019–present
- Model years: 2020–2025 (North America)
- Assembly: United States: Spring Hill, Tennessee (Spring Hill Manufacturing); China: Jinqiao (SAIC-GM)
- Designer: Robin Krieg

Body and chassis
- Class: Mid-size luxury crossover SUV (E)
- Body style: 5-door SUV
- Layout: Front-engine, front-wheel-drive; Front-engine, all-wheel-drive
- Platform: C1XX platform
- Related: Buick Enclave; Chevrolet Traverse; GMC Acadia; Chevrolet Blazer; Cadillac XT5

Powertrain
- Engine: 2.0 L LSY I4; 3.6 L LGX V6 (North America)
- Transmission: 9-speed 9T50 automatic

Dimensions
- Wheelbase: 112.7 in (2,863 mm)
- Length: 198.8 in (5,050 mm)
- Width: 77.3 in (1,964 mm)
- Height: 68.9 in (1,750 mm)
- Curb weight: 4,440–4,689 lb (2,014–2,127 kg)

Chronology
- Predecessor: Cadillac SRX (1st generation, 7-passenger models)
- Successor: Cadillac Vistiq

The Cadillac XT6 is a mid-size luxury crossover SUV with three-row seating manufactured by the Cadillac division of General Motors. The vehicle was introduced on January 12, 2019, at the North American International Auto Show. It went on sale in June of the same year as a 2020 model.

== Overview ==
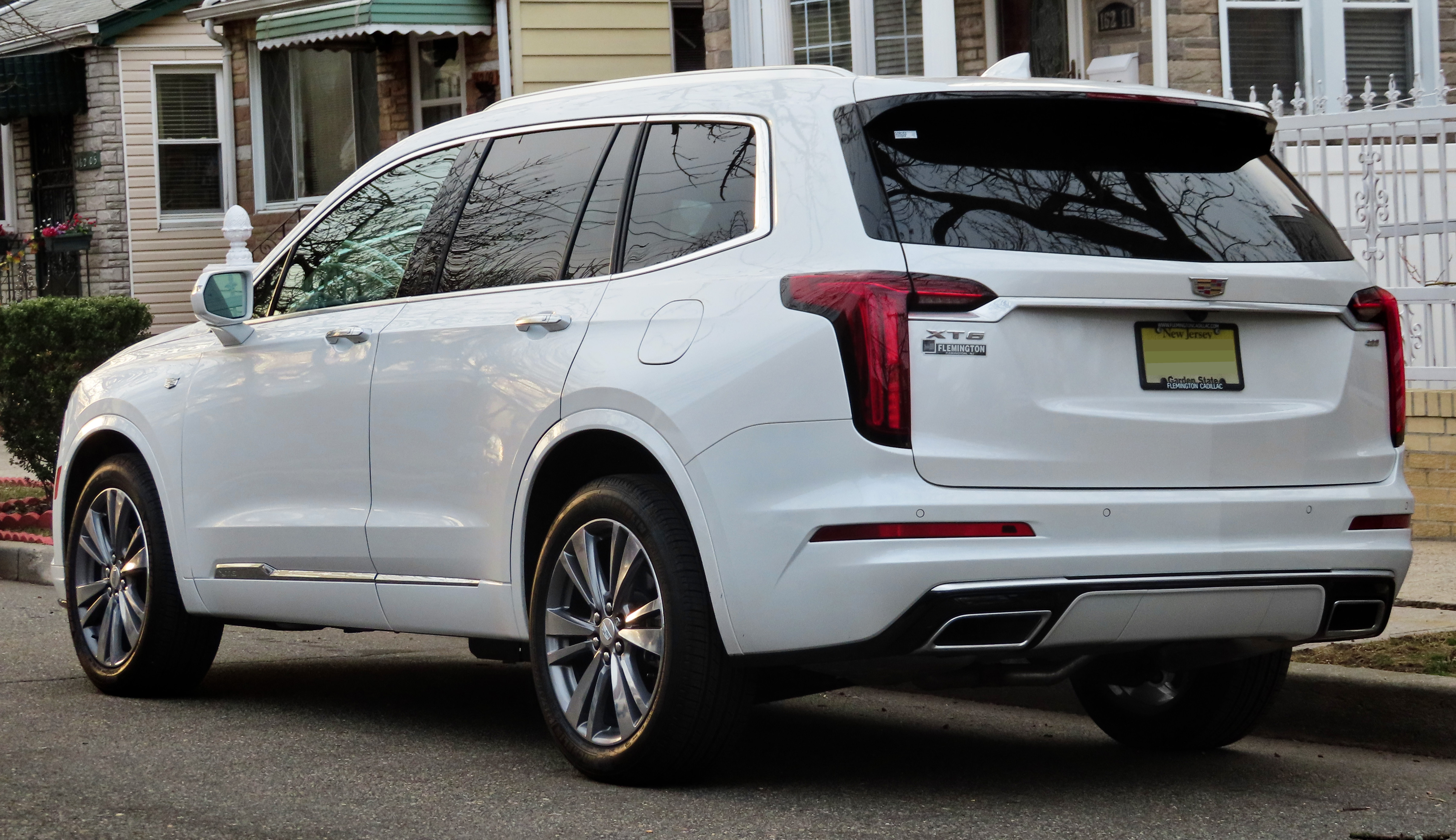
Rear view

The XT6 (short for Crossover Touring 6) is Cadillac’s third crossover SUV, and the largest in Cadillac's XT series, slotted between the XT5 and the full size SUV Escalade. The XT6 is produced at GM's Spring Hill, Tennessee plant, while the Chinese-market XT6 is manufactured in Shanghai by SAIC-GM. The XT6 went on sale in Russia in February 2020. It also went on sale in Japan in early 2020 with one trim level, six-passenger seating, and left hand drive configuration.

While it serves as the high luxury counterpart to the mid-size 3-row Chevrolet Traverse and Buick Enclave in the crossover SUV segment, the XT6 shares its wheelbase with the mid-size GMC Acadia, Cadillac XT5, and the Chinese version of the Chevrolet Blazer. Cadillac describes the XT6 as a “mid-size plus” vehicle as they see the XT5 as their primary mid-size CUV.

Facelift

The first-generation XT6 was discontinued in 2025 in North America. However, General Motors is developing a second generation XT6, which is expected to the US market as part of Cadillac's portfolio of next-generation gas powered vehicles. The second-generation XT6 is expected to ride on the same platform as the outgoing generation, and be built at the Spring Hill plant. It is expected to receive a slight increase in length to its wheelbase to provide more room for the third row. Cadillac stated that its return will occur after the launch of the redesigned XT5 in 2027.

=== Seating ===
The XT6 has standard seven passenger seating, with a six-seat configuration as an option. Genuine leather offered on premium lux and sport.

=== Powertrain ===
The XT6 comes with either a 2.0L I4 turbo engine, making 237 hp (177 kW) or a 3.6L V6 LGX engine, making 310 hp (231 kW). Each engine is mated to a nine-speed automatic transmission with next-generation Electronic Precision Shift. A choice of AWD and FWD are offered.

=== Trim levels ===
Trim levels on the XT6 include "Luxury", "Premium Luxury", and "Sport".

== Reception ==
The XT6 received mixed reviews, with XT6's styling and features being particularly criticized as reviewers believed both pale in comparison to the concurrently launched Lincoln Aviator. Reviewers also criticized the lack of an optional hybrid powertrain, which is available on a number of the XT6's competitors. Car & Driver gave it an indifferent review: "It fails to match its competitors' luxury quotients or meaningfully set itself apart from its GMC and Chevrolet-badged siblings," Cars.com called the XT6 "underwhelming," while The Drive notes "For everything the XT6 gets right, it’s hard not to think that the much more interesting Lincoln Aviator with its handsome look, posh interior, and a high-performance plug-in hybrid option is going to eat this Caddy's lunch."

== Safety ==
The XT6 was awarded "Top Safety Pick+" for three consecutive years, by IIHS. The 2024 model year XT6 was given an overall poor rating for the updated moderate overlap crash test, as there was a reported medium to high risk of injury to the rear dummy passenger.

IIHS scores (2020)
Small overlap front (driver)	Good	
Small overlap front (passenger)	Good	
Moderate overlap front (original test)	Good	
Side (original test)	Good	
Side (updated test)	Poor	
Roof strength	Good	
Head restraints and seats	Good	
Headlights	Acceptable	
Front crash prevention: vehicle-to-vehicle	Superior	standard
Front crash prevention: vehicle-to-vehicle	Superior	optional
Front crash prevention: vehicle-to-pedestrian (Day)	Superior	standard
Front crash prevention: vehicle-to-pedestrian (Day)	Superior	optional
Child seat anchors (LATCH) ease of use	Acceptable	

IIHS scores (2024)
Small overlap front	Good
Moderate overlap front (original test)	Good
Moderate overlap front (updated test)	Poor
Side (original test)	Good
Side (updated test)	Poor
Headlights	Acceptable
Front crash prevention: vehicle-to-pedestrian	Acceptable
Seatbelt reminders	Acceptable
Child seat anchors (LATCH) ease of use	Acceptable

== Sales ==
Calendar year	United States	China
2019	11,559	5,795
2020	22,609	26,555
2021	20,662	37,998
2022	20,053	20,326
2023	19,119	15,378
2024	20,225	6,506
2025	17,060	3,015
