= Education in Shanghai =

Education in Shanghai includes five years of primary education, four years of junior secondary education, and three years of senior secondary education, as well as higher education, including universities and colleges.

== Tertiary education and research ==
Shanghai is an international center of research and development and as of 2024, it was ranked second globally (after Beijing) by scientific research outputs, as tracked by the Nature Index. It is also a major center of higher education in China. As of 2023, Shanghai had 68 universities and colleges, ranking first in East China region as a city with most higher education institutions.

Shanghai has many highly ranked educational institutions, with 15 universities listed in 147 Double First-Class Universities ranking second nationwide among all cities in China (after Beijing). According to the U.S. News & World Report Best Global University Ranking for 2026, Shanghai has the second highest concentration of universities included in the ranking among all major cities in the world (after Beijing), totaling 24, with two in the global top 50 and six in the global top 500.

A number of China's most prestigious universities appearing in the global university rankings are based in Shanghai, including Fudan University, Shanghai Jiao Tong University, Tongji University, East China Normal University, Shanghai University, East China University of Science and Technology, Donghua University, Shanghai University of Finance and Economics, ShanghaiTech University, Shanghai International Studies University, University of Shanghai for Science and Technology, Shanghai University of Electric Power, Shanghai Normal University, Shanghai Maritime University, Second Military Medical University, Shanghai University of Traditional Chinese Medicine, Shanghai Ocean University, Shanghai University of Engineering Science, Shanghai Institute of Technology, Shanghai Conservatory of Music, and Shanghai University of Sport. Some of these universities were selected as "985 universities" or "211 universities" since the 90s by the Chinese government in order to build world-class universities.

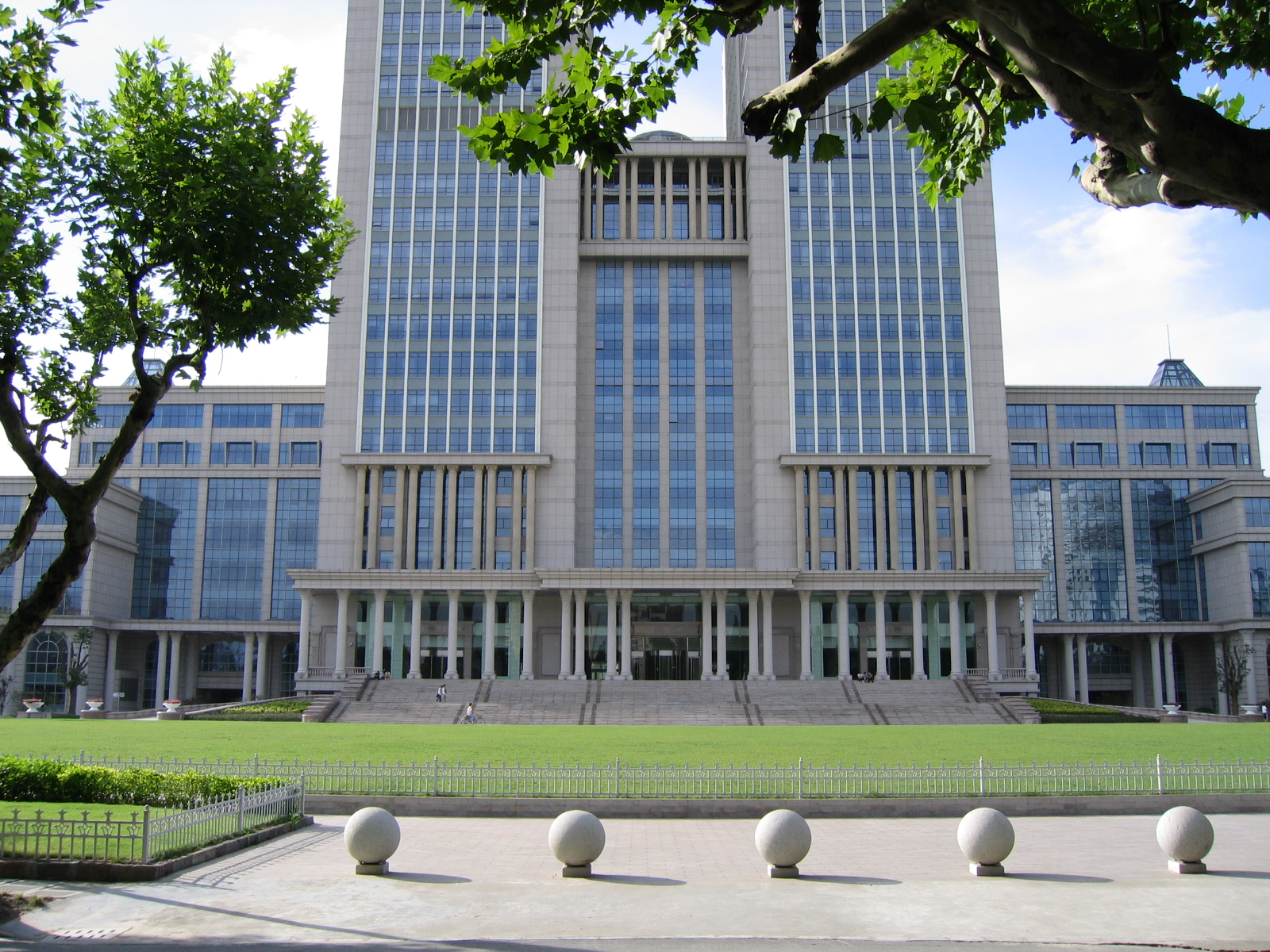
Fudan University

Shanghai is a seat of two members (Fudan University and Shanghai Jiao Tong University) of the C9 League, an alliance of elite Chinese universities offering comprehensive and leading education, and these two universities are ranked consistently in the Asia top 10, and in the global top 50 research comprehensive universities according to the most influential university rankings in the world such as QS Rankings, Shanghai Rankings, Times Higher Education Rankings and U.S. News & World Report Best Global Universities Ranking.

The other two members of the "Project 985", Tongji University and East China Normal University, are also based in Shanghai and internationally; they are regarded as one of the most reputable Chinese universities by the Times Higher Education World Reputation Rankings where they ranked 150–175th globally. The city is also home to the Shanghai University of Sport, which consistently ranks the best in China among universities specialized in sports. As of 2024, Shanghai University of Sport ranks #1 in Asia and #29 globally according to the "Global Ranking of Sport Science Schools and Departments" released by Shanghai Ranking.

The city has many Chinese–foreign joint education institutes, such as the Shanghai University–University of Technology Sydney Business School since 1994, the University of Michigan–Shanghai Jiao Tong University Joint Institute since 2006, and New York University Shanghai—the first China–U.S. joint venture university—since 2012. Fudan University established a joint EMBA program with Washington University in St. Louis in 2002 which has since consistently been ranked as one of the best in the world. In 2012, NYU Shanghai was established in Pudong by New York University in partnership with East China Normal University as the first Sino-US joint venture university. In 2013 the Shanghai Municipality and the Chinese Academy of Sciences founded the ShanghaiTech University in the Zhangjiang Hi-Tech Park in Pudong. This new research university is aiming to be a first-class institution on a national and international level. The cadre school China Executive Leadership Academy in Pudong is also located in Shanghai, as well as the China Europe International Business School.

The city government's education agency is the Shanghai Municipal Education Commission.

The city is also a seat of the Shanghai Academy of Social Sciences, China's oldest think tank for the humanities and social sciences. It is the largest one outside the capital of Beijing after the Chinese Academy of Social Sciences (CASS).

Historically Shanghai was a center of higher education. In 1949 it, which at the time held 1.43% of the people in the country, had 41 institutions of higher education, 20% of the country's total number of such.

== Primary and secondary education ==
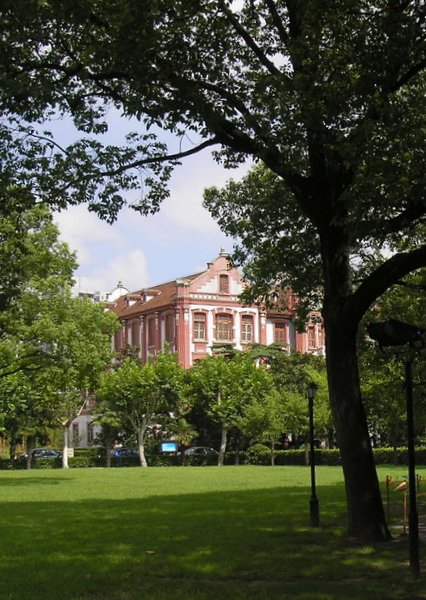
Shanghai Jiao Tong University Library

The city government's education agency is the Shanghai Municipal Education Commission.

Children with foreign passports are permitted to attend any public school in Shanghai. Prior to 2007 they were permitted to attend 150 select public schools. In 2006 about 2,000 non-Chinese nationals under 18 years of age attended Shanghai public schools. Students with Hanyu Shuiping Kaoshi (HSK) above 3 or 4 may attend public schools using Mandarin Chinese as the medium of instruction, while students below HSK 3–4 may attend international divisions of public schools or private international schools.

Shanghai ranked first in the 2009 and 2012 Program for International Student Assessment (PISA), a worldwide study of academic performance of 15-year-old students conducted by the OECD. Shanghai students, including migrant children, scored highest in every aspect (math, reading and science) in the world. The study concludes that public-funded schools in Shanghai have the highest educational quality in the world. Critics of PISA results counter that, in Shanghai and other Chinese cities, most children of migrant workers can only attend city schools up to the ninth grade, and must return to their parents' hometowns for high school due to hukou restrictions, thus skewing the composition of the city's high school students in favor of wealthier local families.

The 2010 census shows that out of Shanghai's total population, 22.0% had a college education, double the level from 2000, while 21.0% had high school, 36.5% middle school, and 1.35% primary school education. 2.74% of residents age 15 and older were illiterate.

As of 2011 Shanghai has more than 930 kindergartens, 1,200 primary and 850 middle schools. Over 760,000 middle schools students and 871,000 primary school students are taught by 76,000 and 64,000 teaching staff respectively.

The city government has a financing scheme meant to spread resources to lower income areas by collecting taxes from all areas and then redistributing the money according to need.

=== History ===
In the late Qing Dynasty, school districts were introduced into Shanghai, allowing for communities to set local education policies and making education more common. By 1936, 59% of children total were enrolled in educational institutions; of those enrolled in school, about two-thirds were boys and the rest were girls. Grace C. L. Mak and Leslie N. K. Lo, authors of "Education," wrote that education in the city was "way ahead the rest of China" in 1949 although those standards would have been "weak" in 1996. Virtually all children of primary school age in urban areas in the city were enrolled in school by 1958, and by 1983 the same went for children of those ages in rural areas of Shanghai Municipality. Shanghai was the first city in the country to implement 9-year mandatory education consisting of elementary school and junior high school. The city previously designated "key schools" or favored schools which received more resources than others, but ended the system in 1994.

A third party management system called "entrusted management", in which low performing schools received outside management, was given trials in 2005 and permanently established in 2007.

In September 2021 the Shanghai authorities will begin requiring children in primary and secondary to study Xi Jinping thought. Additionally, from that date primary schools will no longer have final examinations about the English language.

=== International schools ===
As of 2019 Shanghai had about 20 international schools. As of 2015 Shanghai has the largest number of international schools of any city in China.

Schools for children of foreign residents include:

- Britannica International School Shanghai
- Dulwich College Shanghai
- Concordia International School Shanghai
- Fudan International School
- German School Shanghai (Hongqiao and Yangpu Campuses)
- Harrow Shanghai
- Hong Qiao International School - Rainbow Bridge International School
- Japanese Classroom Shanghai Educational Academy
- Lycée Français de Shanghai (Hongqiao and Yangpu Campuses)
- The International Division of No. 2 High School of East China Normal University
- Nord Anglia International School Shanghai Pudong
- Shanghai American School
- Shanghai Community International School
- Shanghai Experimental School International Division
- Shanghai Guangming High School
- International Division of Shanghai Foreign Language School Affiliated to Shanghai International Studies University
- Shanghai High School International Division
- Shanghai Hishou Japanese Continuation Study Center
- Shanghai Japanese School
- Shanghai Jincai High School International Division
- Shanghai Korean School
- Shanghai Livingston American School
- Shanghai Qinghai Korea Academy
- Shanghai Soong Ching Ling School International Division
- Shanghai Singapore International School
- Shanghai Sundai School
- Shanghai Yimai Japanese Mandarin Learning Institute
- Toshin International After School
- Wellington College International Shanghai
- Western International School of Shanghai
- Yew Chung International School of Shanghai

Kindergartens for children of foreign residents include:

- OISCA Shanghai Japanese Kindergarten
- Shanghai Angel Kindergarten
- Shanghai Utsukushigaoka Montessori Kindergarten
- Toshin International Kindergarten
- Tiny Tots International Pre-School and Kindergarten

Other international schools include:

- Adcote School Shanghai
- Bond Canadian Academy
- The British International School Shanghai, Puxi Campus
- Canadian International Academy
- Canadian Trillium College
- International Philippine School Shanghai
- Maple Leaf International High School — Shanghai
- Nord Anglia Chinese International School
- Russian Consulate School in Shanghai (Russian: Начальная общеобразовательная школа при Генеральном консульстве Российской Федерации в Шанхае)
- Shanghai Pinghe School
- Shanghai United International School
- The SMIC Private School
- Shanghai World Foreign Language Middle School
- YK Pao School

Defunct:

- Shanghai Rego International School
