= List of international schools in Shanghai =

Shanghai is considered to be a global destination for international education, and has been referred to as an "education Mecca" because the city has consistently topped international rankings. In Shanghai, there are three types of educational institutions expatriates can select from: International schools, bilingual schools, and International Divisions of Public Schools. Within the ecosystem of Shanghai, there are many options for specifically desired curriculum, including American, British, French, German, and Singaporean International School options.

This is a list of international schools in Shanghai, China:

- Britannica International School Shanghai
- British International School Shanghai
- Concordia International School Shanghai
- Dulwich College Shanghai
- Shanghai French School
- German School Shanghai
- Harrow International School Shanghai
- Hong Qiao International School - Rainbow Bridge International School
- Nord Anglia International School Shanghai, Pudong
- Shanghai American School
- Shanghai Community International School
- Shanghai Japanese School
- Shanghai Livingston American School
- Shanghai Singapore International School
- The British International School Shanghai, Puxi Campus
- Wellington College International Shanghai
- Western International School of Shanghai
- Yew Chung International School of Shanghai
- YK Pao School
