= Yew Chung International School of Qingdao =

School in Qingdao, Shandong, China

- Qingdao, China

Information
- Type: Preschool, Kindergarten, Primary School, Secondary Education
- Motto: "Align with Science and Technology, Culture and Art, Love and Charity."
- Established: 2006
- Director: Dr. Betty Chan Po-King
- Information: ycqdenquiry@ycis.com
- Website: www.ycis-qd.com

Yew Chung International School of Qingdao (YCIS Qingdao, simplified Chinese: 青岛耀中国际学校; traditional Chinese: 青岛耀中國際學校) is an accredited K2-Year 13 international school for boys and girls in Qingdao, China.

== Accreditations ==
YCIS Qingdao holds membership in the Council of International Schools (CIS), and its Secondary Section is authorised as an accredited Cambridge International Examinations Centre.

== Academics ==
=== Early Childhood Education (ECE) ===
A play-based, bilingual programme for children aged 2–5.

=== Primary ===
The Primary section follows the Yew Chung Curriculum, a bilingual programme developed by the foundation’s Curriculum and Professional Development Division.

=== Secondary ===
Years 7–9:

The Yew Chung Curriculum

Years 10–11:

the International General Certificate of International Education Programme (IGCSE)

(Year 11: Pre A Level)

Years 12–13:

International Baccalaureate Diploma (IBDP)

General Certificate of Education Advanced Level Programme (A Level)

== Origins and history ==
The Ministry of Education of the People's Republic of China has accredited the Yew Chung International School of Qingdao for the enrollment of children of foreign nationals. The bilingual (English and Mandarin) school serves students ages 2 to 18 (K2 to Year 13) and provides early childhood education or kindergarten, primary school education, and secondary school education.

YCIS Qingdao is part of the Yew Chung Foundation, which operates campuses in Shanghai, Beijing, Chongqing, Hong Kong, and California.

== Leadership ==
Western Co-Principal: Stephen O'Connor

Chinese Co-Principal: Grace Du

== Campus & Facilities ==
The campus includes:

- Classrooms equipped with interactive Smartboards and air filtration systems.
- Dedicated science, art, and music rooms.
- Libraries with English and Chinese collections.
- Sports facilities, including gymnasiums and outdoor fields.
- Boarding options for secondary students.

== Timeline ==
- 2006 – YCIS Qingdao is founded.
- 2008 – YCIS Qingdao raises relief donations for victims of the Sichuan earthquake, sparking the beginnings of the Seeds of Hope project.
- 2011 – YCIS Qingdao opens a 5-story, purpose-built campus in Huangdao District, Qingdao.
- 2016 – YCIS Qingdao is formally accredited by the Council of International Schools (CIS), the New England Association of Schools and Colleges (NEASC), and the National Centre for School Curriculum and Textbook Development (NCCT).
- 2016 – YCIS Qingdao becomes an IB Diploma Programme World School.

== Network of Schools ==
- Yew Chung International School of Hong Kong
- Yew Chung International School of Shanghai
- Yew Chung International School of Beijing
- Yew Chung International School of Chongqing
- Yew Chung International School of Qingdao
- Yew Chung International School of Silicon Valley
