= Yew Chung International School of Chongqing =

International school in Chongqing, China

- 重庆耀中国际学校

Location
- 2 Huxia Street, Yuan Yang Town, Yubei District; Chongqing, 401122; China; 29.6627°N 106.5321°E

Information
- Type: Preschool, Kindergarten, Primary School, Secondary School
- Motto: "Align with Science and Technology, Culture and Art, Love and Charity."
- Established: 2001
- Director: Dr. Betty Chan Po-King
- Information: enquiry@cq.ycef.com
- Website: www.ycis-cq.com

Yew Chung International School of Chongqing
- Simplified Chinese: 重庆耀中国际学校
- Traditional Chinese: 重慶耀中國際學校
Transcriptions
Standard Mandarin
- Hanyu Pinyin: Chóngqìng Yào Zhōng Guójì Xuéxiào

Yew Chung International School of Chongqing (Chinese: 重庆耀中国际学校) is an accredited K3 - Year 13 international school for boys and girls located in the Chongqing International School Garden of the city's New Northern Economic Development Zone. The school's international curriculum prepares students to become bilingually competent in English and Chinese and internationally minded.

== Origins and history ==
The Ministry of Education of the People's Republic of China has accredited Yew Chung International School of Chongqing for the enrollment of children of foreign nationals. The bilingual (English and Mandarin) school serves students ages 3 to 19 (K3 to Year 13) and provides early childhood education or kindergarten, primary and secondary education. The international school is part of the Yew Chung Education Foundation, which operates campuses in Shanghai, Qingdao, Beijing, Hong Kong, and Northern California.

== Timeline ==
- 2001 - YCIS Chongqing is founded
- 2001 - YCIS Chongqing adapts its Co-Teaching model
- 2016 - YCIS Chongqing celebrates its 15th anniversary
- 2016 - YCIS Chongqing is formally accredited by three separate academic accreditation organizations (NEASC, CIS, CIE).
- 2017 - YCIS Chongqing has more than 400 enrolled students

== Accreditation ==
- New England Association of Schools and Colleges (NEASC)
- Council of International Schools (CIS)
- Cambridge International Certificate of Secondary Education (IGCSE)
- International Baccalaureate Diploma Programme (IBDP)

== Awards ==
In June 2012 Yew Chung International Schools received the "Cambridge Award for Excellence in Education", the only international school in China to receive this award.

== Network of Schools ==
- Yew Chung International School of Hong Kong
- Yew Chung International School of Beijing
- Yew Chung International School of Shanghai
- Yew Chung International School of Chongqing
- Yew Chung International School of Qingdao
- Yew Chung International School of Silicon Valley
