= Yew Chung International School of Silicon Valley =

Private school in California, United States

Coordinates: 37.4°N 122.067°W

- Silicon Valley; California; United States

Information
- Type: Private
- Motto: Educating the Global Child
- Established: 2002; Campus: 1989
- Status: Open
- Head of school: Kevin Reimer
- Grades: Pre-K to 8
- Age: 2 years+
- Language: English, Mandarin Chinese
- Campuses: 2: K-8 and Preschool
- Website: https://www.ycis-sv.com/

Yew Chung International School of Silicon Valley
- Traditional Chinese: 美國矽谷耀中國際學校
- Simplified Chinese: 美国矽谷耀中国际学校
Transcriptions
Standard Mandarin
- Hanyu Pinyin: Měiguó Xīgǔ Yào Zhōng Guójì Xuéxiào
Yue: Cantonese
- Jyutping: mei5 gwok3 zik6 guk1 jiu6 zung1 gwok3 zai3 hok6 haau6

Yew Chung International School of Silicon Valley (YCISSV; Chinese: 美國矽谷耀中國際學校) is a private Preschool, Elementary and Middle School in the San Francisco Bay Area that provides an international education with an emphasis on Chinese studies. YCIS is a non-profit 501(c)(3) organization and is accredited by the ACS-WASC. The main campus is located at 310 Easy Street, Mountain View, California. The preschool campus is 0.4 miles away at 199 E. Middlefield Road, also in Mountain View.

YCIS Silicon Valley is part of the Yew Chung Education Foundation, which was established in 1932. YCIS also has schools in Hong Kong, Shanghai, Beijing, Chongqing and Qingdao.

Yew Chung International School of Silicon Valley offers a Chinese-English bilingual program. While English is the primary language of instruction, YCIS focuses on bilingual learning through the utilization of the "co-teaching" model; classes are administered by both Western and Chinese teachers to encourage fluency.

== History ==
The first YCIS was established in Hong Kong in 1932. Since then, the school has grown to include campuses in Hong Kong, Shanghai, Beijing, Chongqing, Qingdao and Silicon Valley, USA.

YCIS Silicon Valley opened in 2002 with fewer than 10 students. The school currently has an enrollment of over 240 students in Preschool through Middle School. Students represent over 40 zip codes in the Bay Area. Graduates of YCIS Silicon Valley go on to attend private, public charter and neighborhood schools including: Harker, Castilleja, Nueva, Keys, Girls’ Middle School, Valley Christian, The King's Academy, Bullis Charter, Summit Denali and more.

In 2011, YCIS Silicon Valley expanded to include a new preschool campus on East Middlefield Road, which is close to the Main Campus at Easy Street.

In 2014, the addition of portable classrooms at the Main Campus made it possible for the school to add middle school grades.

== Curriculum ==
Yew Chung International School of Silicon Valley offers education to students from Preschool (at age 2), Elementary School and Middle School.

== Network of Schools ==
- Yew Chung International School of Hong Kong
- Yew Chung International School of Shanghai
- Yew Chung International School of Beijing
- Yew Chung International School of Chongqing
- Yew Chung International School of Qingdao
- Yew Chung International School of Silicon Valley
