= SES =

SES, S.E.S., Ses and similar variants can refer to:

== Business and economics ==
- Socioeconomic status
- Scottish Economic Society, a learned society in Scotland
- SES, callsign of the TV station SES/RTS (Mount Gambier, South Australia)
- SES, a satellite owner and operator
- SES Water, a UK water supply company for east Surrey, West Sussex, west Kent, and south London
- Single Economic Space or Eurasian Economic Space, a project of economical integration of five post-Soviet states: Belarus, Kazakhstan, Russia, Armenia, and Kyrgyzstan
- Single European Sky, in air traffic management
- Stock Exchange of Singapore
- Subud Enterprise Services

== Science and technology ==
- Science and Engineering South, a consortium of 7 research-intensive public universities in the Southeast of England, UK
- Sedimentation Enhancing Strategy, an environmental management project for land-building in river deltas
- Service Engine Soon, a warning message on modern automobiles
- Service Evaluation System, an Operations Support System used by telephone companies
- Ses Hübner, a fungus moth genus nowadays synonymized with Tinea
- Small Edison Screw, a variety of the Edison screw standard light bulb fitting
- Socio-ecological system
- Solvent excluded surface, a chemistry-related term
- Standard Event System, a guideline to study vertebrate embryos
- Surface effect ship, a class of ship that has both an air cushion (like a hovercraft) and twin hulls (like a catamaran)
- Seismic Electric Signals, in seismology

=== Computer technology ===
- SCSI Enclosure Services, a computer protocol for management of disk storage enclosures
- Search Engine Strategies, a search engine marketing conference and expo
- SecureEasySetup, a technology developed by Broadcom to easily set up wireless LANs with Wi-Fi Protected Access
- Sequence Execution System, a WinCC option used for batch production
- Signed Envelope Sender, a predecessor email sender validation protocol to Bounce Address Tag Validation
- Amazon Simple Email Service, part of Amazon.com's cloud computing suite (AWS)
- .SES (session file), industry-standard export file format of Specctra-compatible autorouters

== Education ==
- School of Environmental Studies (disambiguation), multiple schools
- School of Economic Science in London, England
- Southern Evangelical Seminary in Charlotte, North Carolina
- Sunnyside Environmental School in Portland, Oregon
- Shanghai Experimental School, a ten-year 1–12 school in Shanghai, China
- Stamford Endowed Schools, a group of independent schools in Stamford, Lincolnshire

== Popular culture ==
- Ses (film) (The Voice), a 2010 Turkish horror film
- S.E.S. (group), (Sea, Eugene, Shoo), a Korean girl group
- Sex, Ecology, Spirituality, a 2001 book by Integral philosopher Ken Wilber
- Smile Empty Soul, an American post-grunge band from California
  - Smile Empty Soul (album)
- Straight Edge Society, a professional wrestling stable

== People ==
- Stephan El Shaarawy (born 1992), professional footballer for A.S. Roma

== Geography ==
- Ses, alternate name of Sers, Armenia
- Șes, a village in Bunești Commune, Suceava County, Romania
- Șes (Pârâul de Câmpie), a river in Romania
- Șes (Râul Mare), a river in Romania

== Other uses ==
- Senior Executive Service (United States), a civil service classification in the United States federal government
- Blue Shirts Society, also known as Spirit Encouragement Society, a Fascist clique and secret police or para-military force in the Republic of China between 1931 and 1938
- State Emergency Service, a number of volunteer emergency response organisations in Australia, with most state organisations referred to as SES
  - ACT State Emergency Service, a division of the ACT Emergency Services Agency, Australian Capital Territory
  - Queensland State Emergency Service
  - NSW State Emergency Service, New South Wales
  - South Australian State Emergency Service
  - Tasmania State Emergency Service
  - Victoria State Emergency Service
  - Western Australia State Emergency Service, a division of the Department of Fire and Emergency Services, Western Australia
- State Emergency Service of Ukraine, emergency response organization in Ukraine
- ses, ISO 639-3 code for Koyraboro Senni
- ses, a variant of the Solresol language
- Spiritual Exercises (disambiguation)
- Sønderjylland Elite Speedway, Danish speedway team
