= Gubei =

Gubei may refer to:

- Gubei, Jiangxi (古陂镇), town in Xinfeng County
- Gubei, Shanghai (古北), residential area in Changning District
- Gubei Water Town, tourist attraction in Gubeikou Town of Miyun District, Beijing
