= Nanhui, Shanghai =

Former district of Shanghai, China (2001–2009)

Nanhui District, Shanghai Municipality 上海市南汇区
- District of the People's Republic of China
- 2001–2009
- Location of Nanhui District in Shanghai Municipality
- Area
  - Coordinates: 31°04′02″N 121°45′39″E
- History
  - Established: 2001
  - Disestablished: 2009
Preceded by	Succeeded by
Nanhui County	Pudong
- Today part of: Pudong New Area

Nanhui District (simplified Chinese: 南汇区; traditional Chinese: 南匯區; pinyin: Nánhuì Qū; lit. 'South-confluence District'; Wugniu: noe^{2} we^{6} chiu^{1}; Shanghainese: [nø˩ ɦue˦ tɕʰy˩]), formerly romanized as Nanhwei, was a district of Shanghai until it was merged into Pudong New Area in May 2009. It had a land area of about 809.5 km^{2} (312.5 sq mi) and a 59.5 km (37.0 mi) coastline. The population of Nanhui was 975,017 as of August 2006. On May 6, 2009, it was announced that the State Council of China had approved the proposal to merge Nanhui District into Pudong, which is also a district of Shanghai.

== History ==
About 2000 years ago, the water of the Yangtze River ran to the south because of sea tide and met the Qiantang River so as to form the land near the Tang dynasty, so this district was named by Nanhuizui (Nan is South, Hui means converge, and Zui means mouth in Chinese). Nanhui County was established from Shanghai County in 1726.

In 2001, Nanhui County was renamed Nanhui District. In May 2009 Nanhui was merged into Pudong New Area.

== Climate ==
Climate data for Huinan Town, elevation 5 m (16 ft), (1991–2020 normals, extremes 1981–present)
Month	Jan	Feb	Mar	Apr	May	Jun	Jul	Aug	Sep	Oct	Nov	Dec	Year
Record high °C (°F)	22.1 (71.8)	25.6 (78.1)	27.4 (81.3)	31.7 (89.1)	34.3 (93.7)	35.5 (95.9)	39.0 (102.2)	40.1 (104.2)	36.6 (97.9)	34.0 (93.2)	27.6 (81.7)	23.5 (74.3)	40.1 (104.2)
Mean daily maximum °C (°F)	8.6 (47.5)	10.2 (50.4)	13.9 (57.0)	19.3 (66.7)	24.2 (75.6)	27.1 (80.8)	31.6 (88.9)	31.3 (88.3)	27.6 (81.7)	23.0 (73.4)	17.8 (64.0)	11.5 (52.7)	20.5 (68.9)
Daily mean °C (°F)	4.8 (40.6)	6.2 (43.2)	9.8 (49.6)	14.9 (58.8)	20.0 (68.0)	23.7 (74.7)	28.0 (82.4)	27.9 (82.2)	24.2 (75.6)	19.1 (66.4)	13.6 (56.5)	7.3 (45.1)	16.6 (61.9)
Mean daily minimum °C (°F)	1.8 (35.2)	3.0 (37.4)	6.4 (43.5)	11.2 (52.2)	16.5 (61.7)	21.0 (69.8)	25.3 (77.5)	25.4 (77.7)	21.4 (70.5)	15.7 (60.3)	10.1 (50.2)	4.0 (39.2)	13.5 (56.3)
Record low °C (°F)	−7.9 (17.8)	−6.0 (21.2)	−4.2 (24.4)	−0.7 (30.7)	7.1 (44.8)	12.7 (54.9)	18.7 (65.7)	18.8 (65.8)	11.5 (52.7)	1.9 (35.4)	−1.7 (28.9)	−7.8 (18.0)	−7.9 (17.8)
Average precipitation mm (inches)	72.2 (2.84)	67.9 (2.67)	97.5 (3.84)	85.2 (3.35)	94.0 (3.70)	211.2 (8.31)	135.7 (5.34)	187.8 (7.39)	126.0 (4.96)	73.8 (2.91)	63.7 (2.51)	54.6 (2.15)	1,269.6 (49.97)
Average precipitation days (≥ 0.1 mm)	10.9	10.1	13.4	12.0	11.8	15.0	11.6	11.9	10.2	7.8	9.4	8.8	132.9
Average snowy days	1.8	1.5	0.5	0	0	0	0	0	0	0	0	0.8	4.6
Average relative humidity (%)	77	78	78	77	78	85	82	83	81	78	78	75	79
Mean monthly sunshine hours	112.4	117.0	140.7	164.3	172.6	123.8	207.4	202.1	170.4	164.3	131.9	130.1	1,837
Percentage possible sunshine	35	37	38	42	41	29	48	50	46	47	42	42	41
Source: China Meteorological Administration All-time October high

== Economy ==
Nanhui's GDP in 2006 is about US$4.5 billion. Per Capital Annual Total Income and Net Income of Rural Households is slightly more than US$1000. Public finance-revenue is about US$1.38 billion. In the past, Nanhui got the good rank in Public finance-revenue (the Top 10 of rich county in China). Foreign exchange through exports is about US$1.88 billion.

Nanhui District is now special in developing the Yangshan international deep-water port in the southeast and Pudong International Airport in the northeast. Yangshan deep-water port is a new port in Shanghai. It is connected the Lingang New City with the East China Sea Bridge. It can help Shanghai become the Top 1 harbour city in the world. With the development of Yangshan port and Pudong airport, Nanhui District is developing very fast. Recently the center of Nanhui district enlarge its area to catch up with the development of Shanghai. Huanglu Town has been incorporated into the center of Nanhui.

== Education ==
Nanhui District started to build the College City, including the Shanghai University of Electric Power, Shanghai Fisheries University, Shanghai Maritime University, Shanghai Top technique college and Shanghai I&C Foreign Languages College.

Nanhui High School is famous in Shanghai. Many students have graduated and entered many good universities such as Tsinghua University, Fudan University, etc.

== Culture and travel ==
There is a big "peach blossom" festival (桃花节) held in Nanhui from March to April every year. More than 100,000 travelers come here and enjoy the beautiful scene.

There is a famous safari park in Nanhui. It is established by Shanghai Government and State Forestry Administration in 1995. It is also an AAAA national visiting spot.

Important Culture Sights: Zhang Wentian's Residence.

Famous calligrapher: Su Juxian (January 1, 1882 – December 30, 1991). Su Juxian was the 28th offspring of the great poet Su Dongpo. He was the oldest man in Shanghai (110 years old), and also the oldest poet and calligrapher in China. He donated his body to be researched in science field after he died in 1991.

== Suborbital rocket launch site ==
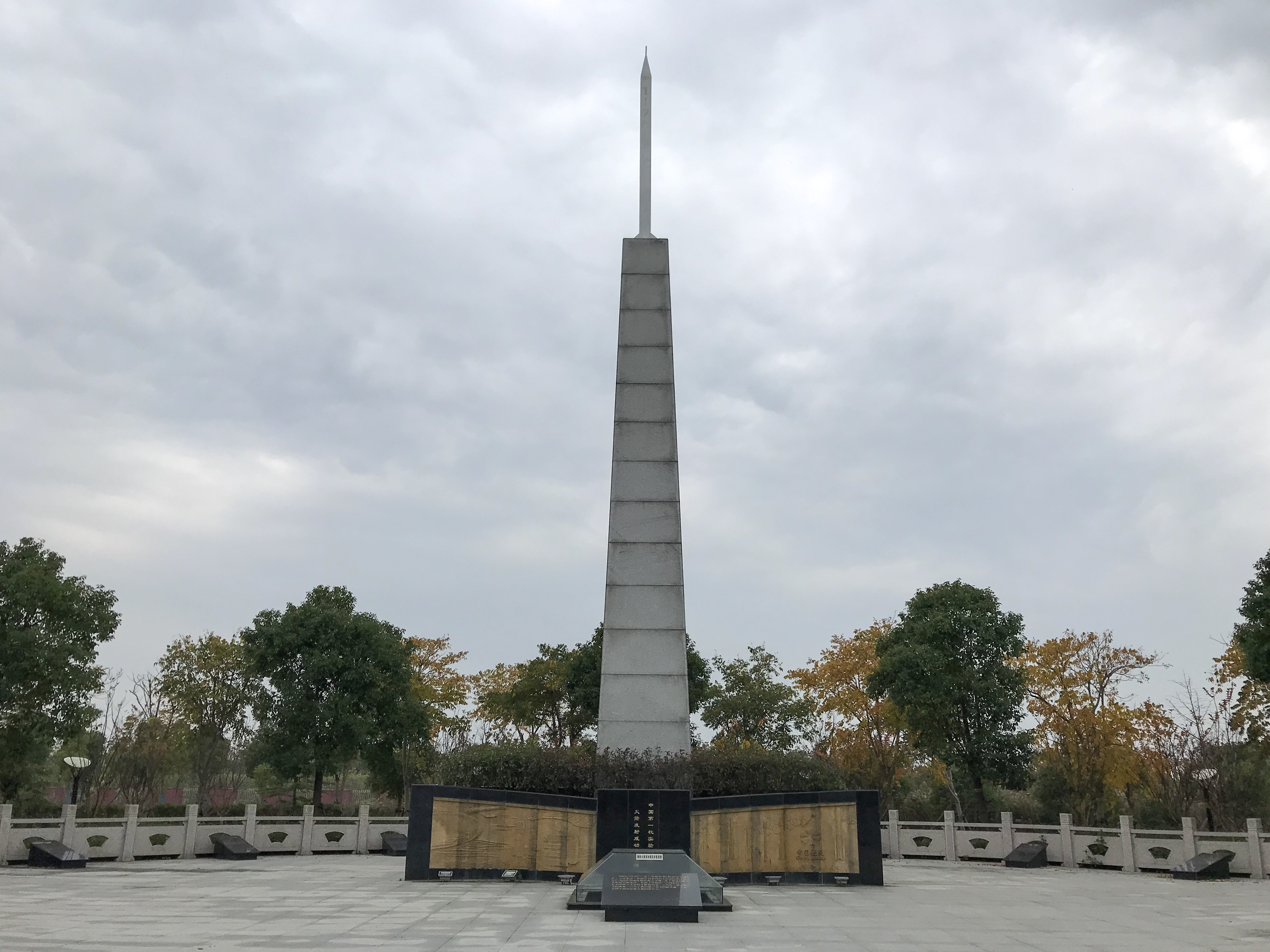
Monument for T-7M sounding rocket was successfully launched in Nanhui

China's first ever T-7M sounding rocket was successfully launched on February 19, 1960.

== See also ==
- Chinese space program
- Yuan Shuxun (magistrate of Nanhui County from 1886)
