= SMIC =

SMIC may refer to:

- The SMIC Private School, in Shanghai
- Semiconductor Manufacturing International Corporation, in Shanghai
- Salaire minimum interprofessionnel de croissance (SMIC), the minimum wage law in France
- Special Material Identification Code, a logistics management code used in association with the NATO Stock Number
- Server Management Interface Chip, part of Intelligent Platform Management Interface (IPMI)
- Missionary Sisters of the Immaculate Conception of the Mother of God, a Roman Catholic religious order
