= Shanghai Pinghe School =

Private secondary school in Pudong, Shanghai, China

- 上海市民办平和双语学校
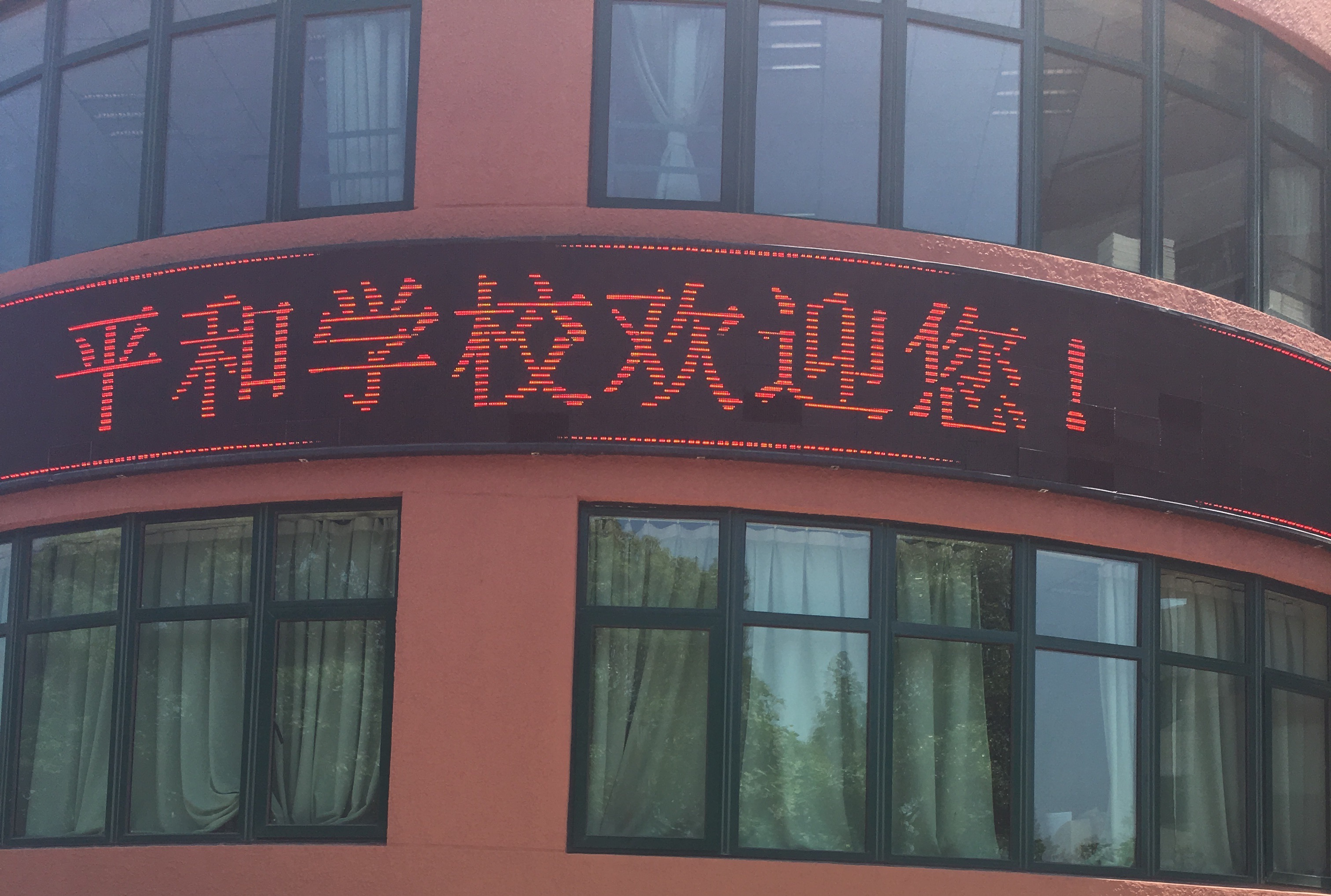

Location
- 261 Huangyang Rd; Shanghai, Pudong, 201206; China

Information
- School type: Private Boarding
- Established: 1996
- Principal: Dr. Tony Janoo
- Grades: 1-12
- Gender: Co-ed
- Enrollment: Around 1500
- Language: Chinese (Local Program), English (IB and International Curriculum)
- Campus size: 24,770 square metres (266,600 sq ft)
- Campus type: Suburban, International Community
- Colors: Red and Green
- Accreditation: IB World School, CITA
- Website: shphschool.com

Shanghai Pinghe School (上海市民办平和双语学校) is a private secondary school in the Jinqiao neighborhood in Pudong, Shanghai, China.

The school consists of an elementary school department (Grades 1–5), a middle school department and a high school department with both International Baccalaureate Diploma Programme and AP Program (Grades 10–12).

== History ==
Shanghai Pinghe School was established in September 1996.

The school is accredited by the IB Diploma Programme.

== See also ==
- List of international schools in Shanghai
