= Gubei, Shanghai =

Gubei 古北
- Residential community
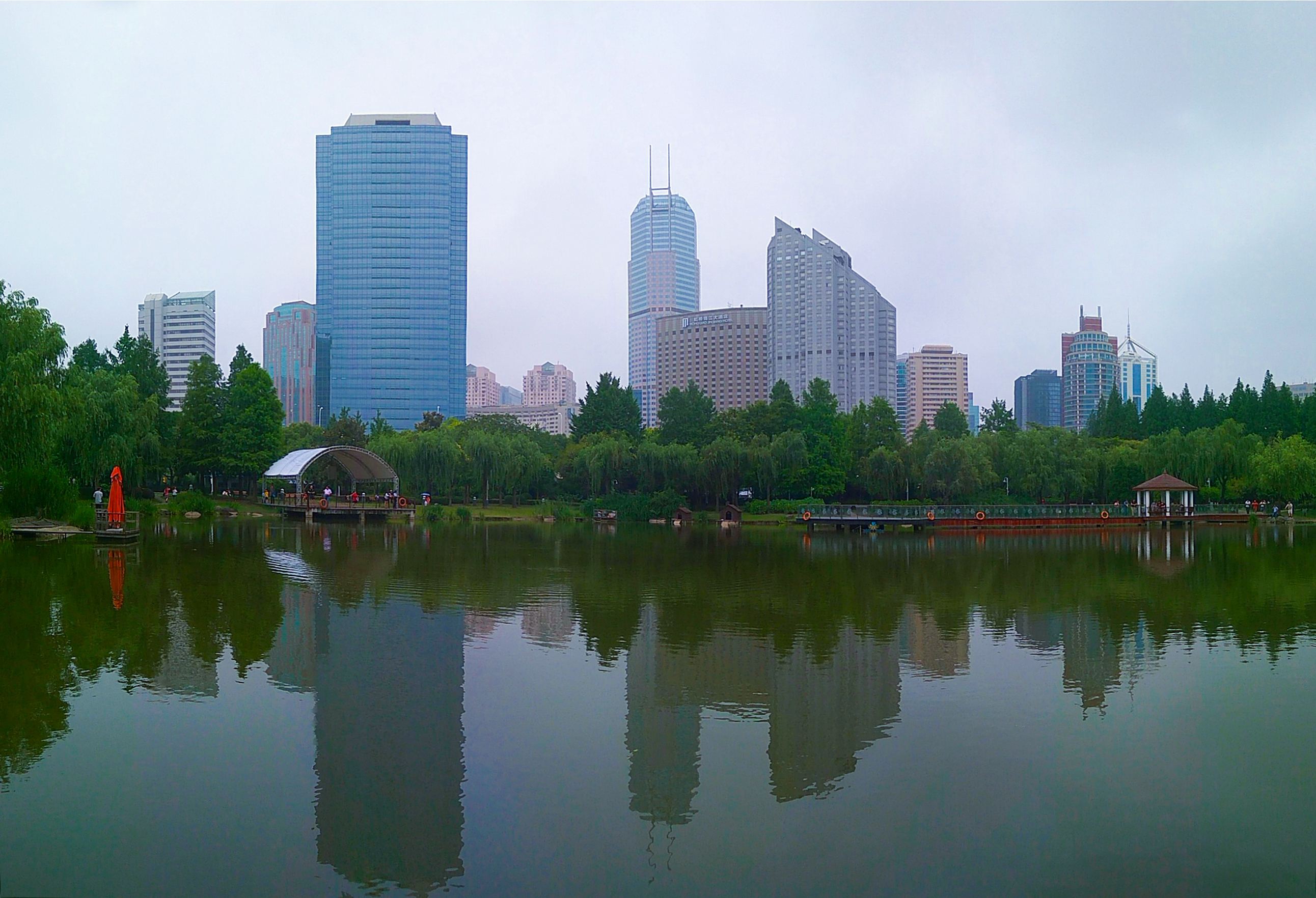
- Interactive map of Gubei
- Coordinates: 31°11′20.0″N 121°24′33.8″E
- Country: People's Republic of China
- Municipality: Shanghai
- District: Changning
- Time zone: UTC+8 (China Standard)
- Area code: 021

Gubei (Chinese: 古北; Shanghainese: ku^{2}poh^{4}; Mandarin pinyin: Gǔběi) is an affluent residential area located in Changning District, Shanghai and covers an area of 136.6 hectares (338 acres). Gubei is best known as an enclave of East Asian expatriates in Shanghai, including those from Japan, South Korea, Hong Kong, Macau and Taiwan. As a result, Gubei is sometimes informally referred to as "Little Tokyo", "Little Taipei" or "K-town". Gubei has a Koreatown neighborhood. Gubei also has a significant number of expatriates from Europe and North America. Administratively, it comprises two residential communities (居委会). Despite its distinct identity, Gubei itself is not an independent administrative unit. Key residential communities in Gubei include: Gubei Xincheng (古北新城), Gubei Hongyuan (古北虹苑), Ronghua Residential Committee (荣华居委会), Huashan Residential Committee (华山居委会)

== Transportation ==
- Shanghai Metro
  - Line 10 (Shanghai Metro), Yili Road station
  - Line 10 (Shanghai Metro), Shuicheng Road station
  - Line 15 (Shanghai Metro), Yaohong Road station
  - Line 15 (Shanghai Metro), Hongbaoshi Road Station
- Buses
  - No.57
  - No.48
  - No.911

== Attractions ==
- Hongqiao State Guesthouse
- Shanghai East Radio Station
- Soong Ching-ling Mausoleum
- Takashimaya (opened in December 2012)

== Schools ==
- Yew Chung International School of Shanghai
- Shanghai Community International School
- Jianqing Experimental School
- Shanghai United International School
- Concord Bilingual High School
- Hong Qiao International School - Rainbow Bridge International School

== See also ==
- Japanese community of Shanghai
