= Shen Fan =

Chinese contemporary artist (born 1952)

- Born: Shanghai, China
- Education: Shanghai Institute of Technology
- Known for: Chinese Abstraction

Chinese name
- Chinese: 申凡
Transcriptions
Standard Mandarin
- Hanyu Pinyin: Shēn Fán

Shen Fan (Chinese: 申凡; born 1952) is a Chinese contemporary artist currently based in Shanghai. He creates work of temperament of the classical Chinese literati arts with intuition.

== Early life ==
Shen Fan’s childhood years were spent in the countryside. Around the age of ten, he went to Shanghai for study and finished elementary school and middle school. For the following six years, Shen did farm work in the countryside, planting all sorts of corps, and he would practice painting and calligraphy by himself when he was not working. At the end of six years, he went back to Shanghai, where he became a product designer.

== Career ==
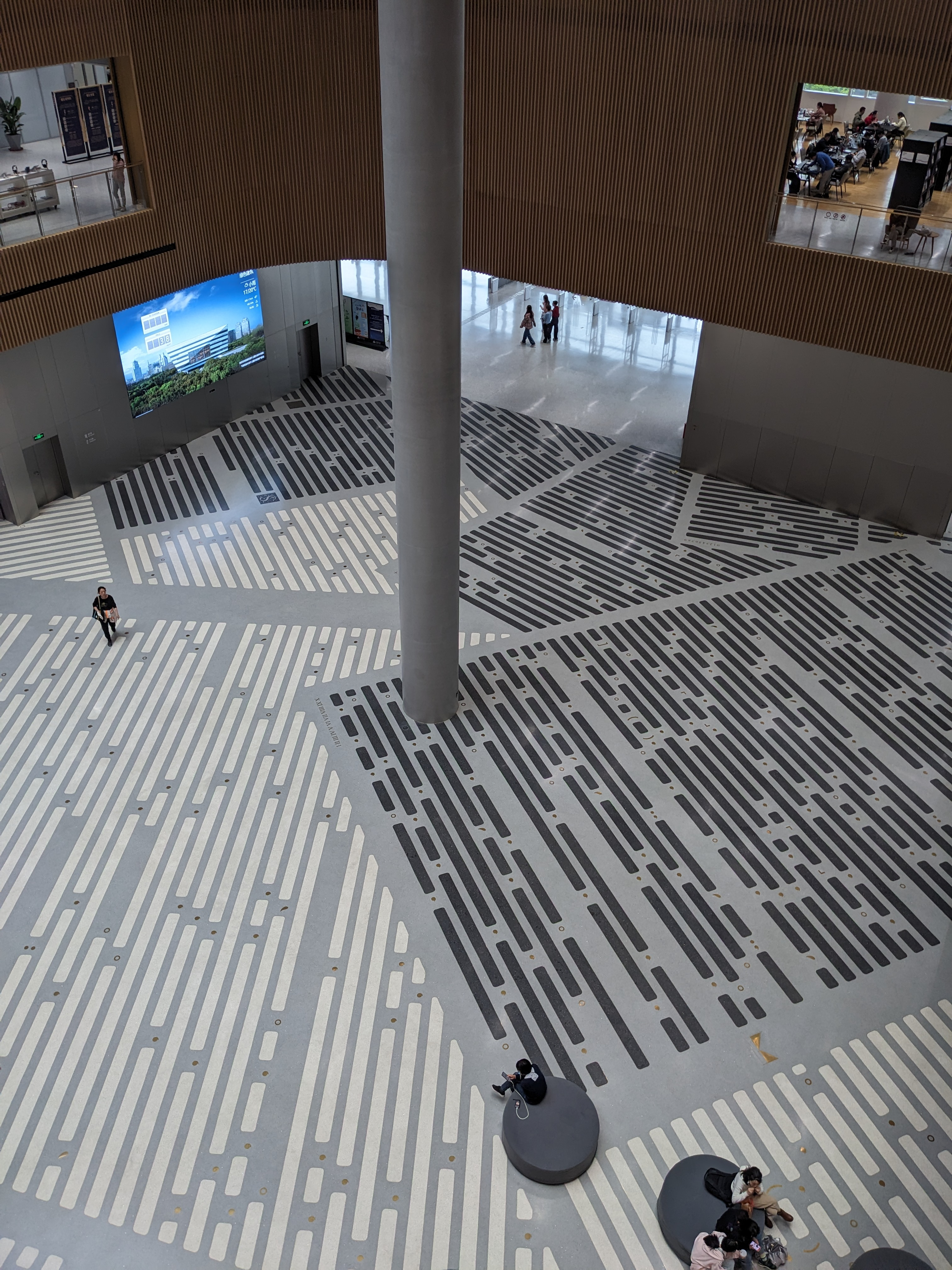
Atrium of Shanghai Library East, designed by Shen Fan

While Shen Fan graduated from the Fine Arts Department of the Shanghai Light Industry Institute (now: Shanghai Institute of Technology) In 1986, the artist began to work in abstract painting around 1982, using such materials as Chinese ink, watercolor and oil paint. With the reform and opening-up policies initiated by Deng Xiaoping, the art scene in China underwent a profound change as the sudden availability of Western art publications prompted many artists to adopt the Western style, including abstraction, as a new mode of art creation. Rooting his work in Eastern philosophy in his pursuit of modernity, Shen represents the rich tradition of abstraction in Shanghai as one of its most important and pioneering figures in the art world.

== Style ==
Shen Fan began disassembling concrete forms and space in painting in the 80s, and started creating abstract painting works. Since the late 1990s, Shen Fan has endeavored to bring Chinese painting elements into a wide variety of mediums and materials including ceramics, neon light, metal, and music, expanding the boundaries between traditional and new media. He is one of the earlier Chinese artists who amalgamate classical aesthetics into the contemporary context to explore contemporary Chinese cultural expressions.

Shen Fan’s works are composed of various series with distinctive features, and ever-evolving materials, while maintaining the temperament of the classical Chinese literati arts. His installation works of 2006 go back to Huang Binhong period and re-analyse the use of space and brush strokes of classical Chinese landscape paintings. Through interactions among vision, touch, text and so on, Shen Fan provides an integrated way of viewing, which embodies his shifted and more wholesome viewing logic.

== Selected solo exhibitions ==
- 1988 Shen Fan's Works on Paper, Shanghai Art Museum, Shanghai, China
- 1997 Shen Fan, Consulate General of France, Shanghai, China
- 2008 I have Been Here, Usher Gallery; The Collection of Lincoln, Lincoln, UK
- 2017 Shen Fan: Punctuation - The Second Time, The Barn Contemporary Art Space, Shenzhen, China
