= Sesa =

Sesa or SESA may refer to:

== Companies and organizations ==
- Sesa Football Academy, a football club of Goa, India
- Sesa Goa, a mining company of India
- Société d'études scientifiques de l'Aude, see Antoine Sabarthès (publisher)
- Société d'Etudes des Systèmes d'Automation, a company that manufactured X.25 switches, see Rémi Després
- Society for Experimental Stress Analysis, original name of the Society for Experimental Mechanics
- Swiss Accident Investigation Board (Service denquête suisse sur les accidents)

== Other uses ==
- Sesa, Spain, a municipality in Aragon
- Sesa language, a language of Papua New Guinea
- Sesa river, a tributary of the Gambhir River, Rajasthan, India
- David Sesa (born 1973), Swiss footballer
- General Ulpiano Paez Airport (ICAO: SESA)
- Shesha (Sanskrit: Śeṣa), a serpent in Hindu mythology
- Standard Encyclopaedia of Southern Africa, published 1971–1976

== See also ==
- SES (disambiguation)
