= Oriental Land (Qingpu) =

Campsite in Shanghai, China

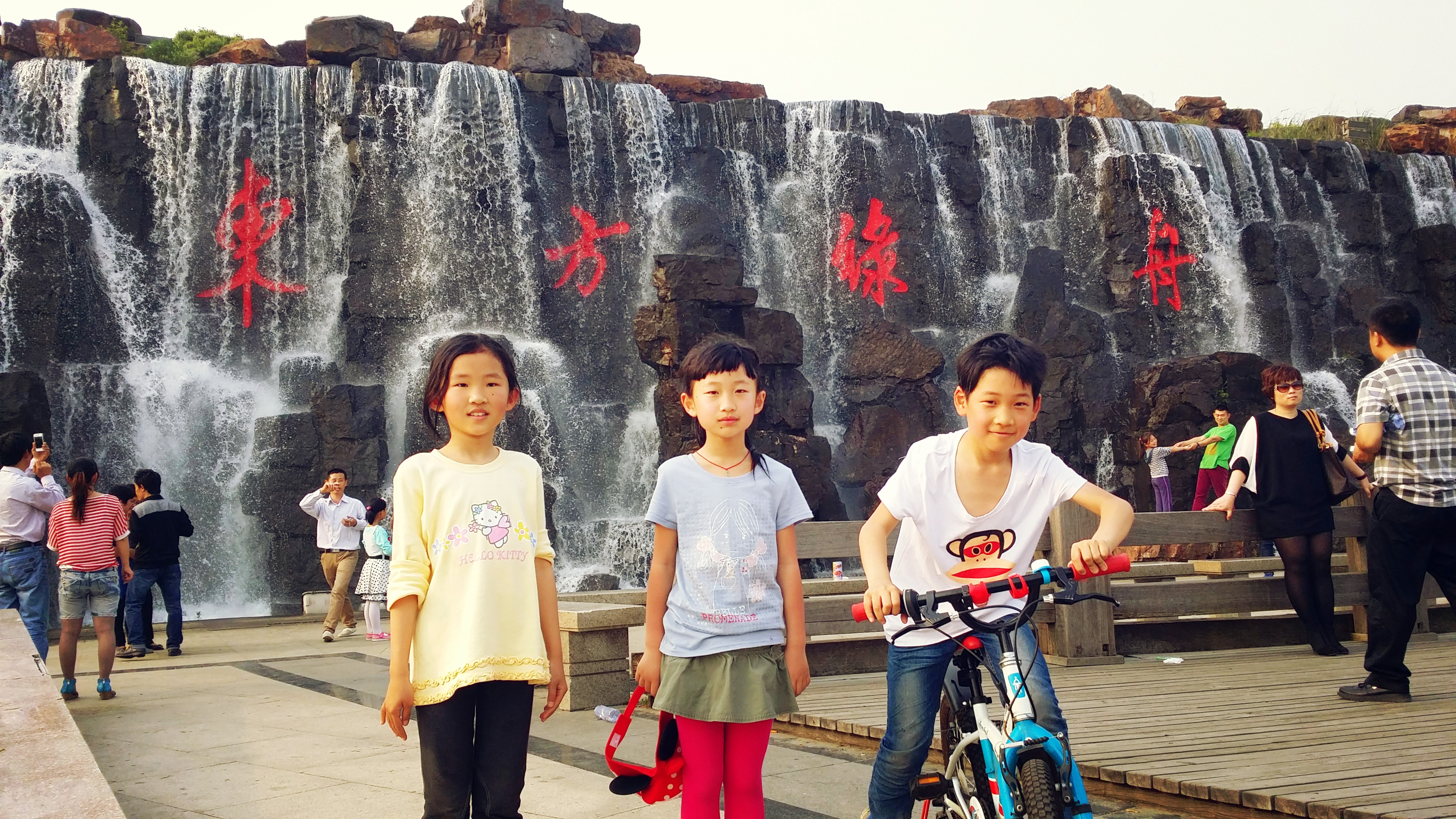

- Location within Shanghai
- Location: Qingpu, Shanghai
- Coordinates: 31°06′04″N 121°01′07″E
- Area: 5,600 acres (2,300 ha)
- Public transit: Hongqiao Railway Station

Oriental Land is a park located in Qingpu District, Shanghai City, under the jurisdiction of Shanghai Municipal Education Commission and Oriental Pearl. It has a land area of 5600 acres and a water area of 2000 acres.

Oriental Land is a AAAA-level Tourist Attraction of China and a Chinese National Environmental Science Base.

== Notable features ==
Among the park's features include a number of themed bridges and a bamboo forest containing 38 species of bamboo, as well as:

- A simulated aircraft carrier, which is 220 meters long, 48 meters wide and 46 meters high, and is modeled after the U.S. Navy's "Nimitz" class aircraft carrier. The aircraft carrier has large exhibition halls such as the Weapons Expo Hall and the National Security Education Hall, as well as activities such as 4D cinema and simulated gun shooting and target practice.
- A Type 33 submarine which served in the East Sea Fleet of the Navy, which visitors can tour.
- The Avenue of Wisdom, a 700 meter long, 25-meter-wide road, which is flanked by 160 statues of Chinese and foreign scientists and thinkers.
- The park's National Security Education Center, which is the largest national security education base in China. The exhibition hall is composed of six parts: "Preface Hall", "Brilliant Achievements", "Guardian of New China", "Building a New Great Wall together", "Looking at the world", and "End Hall".

== Transportation ==
The Oriental Land can be reached by taking Shanghai Metro Line 17 to Hongqiao Railway Station.

== Activities ==
In order to celebrate the centenary of the founding of the Communist Party and commemorate the 85th anniversary of the victory of the Red Army's Long March, the Red Army Footprints Memorial Park was officially opened in Shanghai's Oriental Luzhou on May 11. The Red Army Footprints Memorial Park displays 100 foot prints of the old Red Army and is engraved with the names and printing time of the old Red Army.

National defense education courses are held at the site, including a heavy and light weapons exposition, a weapons development expo, an aviation expo, and a naval exposition. Students are able to learn the operation of number of weapons during the class.

Public safety education courses are also held, including daily life safety, road traffic safety, rail transit safety, fire safety, air safety, meteorological disaster, earthquake disaster, and emergency rescue.

Environmental science courses include parent-child nature class, weather observation, astronomical observation, and a plant identification course.
