= Shezhuang Temple =

Taoist temple in Shanghai, China

Coordinates: 31.2337°N 121.5953°E

Religion
- Affiliation: Taoist

Location
- Location: Jinqiao, Pudong, Shanghai
- Interactive map of Shezhuang Temple

Architecture
- Style: Chinese architecture, Taoist
- Completed: 17th century Ming Dynasty

Website
- http://shszm.org/

The Shezhuang Temple (simplified Chinese: 社庄庙; traditional Chinese: 社莊廟; pinyin: Shèzhuāng Miào) is a Taoist temple in the Jinqiao district of Shanghai, China. It was built at the end of the Ming dynasty in the 17th century in honour of a man named Jin San. A building of fine Chinese architecture, the temple was originally surrounded by an old village that was demolished in the late 2000s to make space for new developments.
