= British International School Shanghai =

The British International School Shanghai

Location
- 111 Jinguang Road, Puxi; Shanghai, China
- Coordinates: 31.1434°N 121.5745°E

Information
- School type: International School
- Established: 2 September 2004
- Founder: Nord Anglia Education
- Sister school: The British International School Shanghai, Puxi Campus
- Principal: Andrew Lancaster
- Age: 2 to 18 years
- Enrollment: 1969
- Website: The British International School Shanghai

The British International School Shanghai is a private international school in Shanghai, China and is part of the Nord Anglia Education family of schools.

== See also ==
- List of international schools in Shanghai
- List of international schools
