= Orbital Education =

British education services company

- Type: Privately held company
- Industry: Education
- Founded: Manchester, UK (2005)
- Founder: Kevin McNeany
- Headquarters: Landmark House, Station Road, Cheadle Hulme, Manchester, UK
- Number of locations: 7 international schools
- Areas served: Spain, Ecuador, Hungary, Slovenina, Qatar, China
- Products: Education Services
- Website: www.orbitaled.com

Orbital Education was founded in 2005 by Kevin McNeany. The school group runs a number of internationally acclaimed schools that follow a range of curricula. Orbital Education has a central office based in Cheadle Hulme, Cheshire, United Kingdom. The company has established schools across four continents, Europe, Asia, North and South America and over 7,000 students as of 2025

Orbital was acquired by Ariston Education in 2026 and no longer exists as a stand alone company.

== Member schools ==
- Baleares International College, Spain
- Britannica International School Budapest
- Britannica International School Shanghai
- British International School of Ljubljana
- The British School of Quito - Quito, Ecuador
- Oryx International School Doha
- United School International, The Pearl - Doha, Qatar
- Britt Academy, Playa del Carmen - Quintana Roo, Mexico
- World Academy Tirana - Tirana, Albania
- International Montessori School of Albania - Tirana, Albania

== Awards and achievements ==
In 2017, Orbital Education was recognised by the London Stock Exchange Group as one of the 1,000 Companies to Inspire Britain consecutively for two years. By 2018, the education company was included in the Sunday Times HSBC International Track 200 for fastest-growing international sales, measured over the company's latest two years of available accounts. 2019 saw Orbital Education recognised at position 35 in the BDO Sunday Times Profit Track 100 list and then honoured with the Queen's Award for Enterprise: International Trade for its excellence in international trade.
