= Britannica International School Budapest =

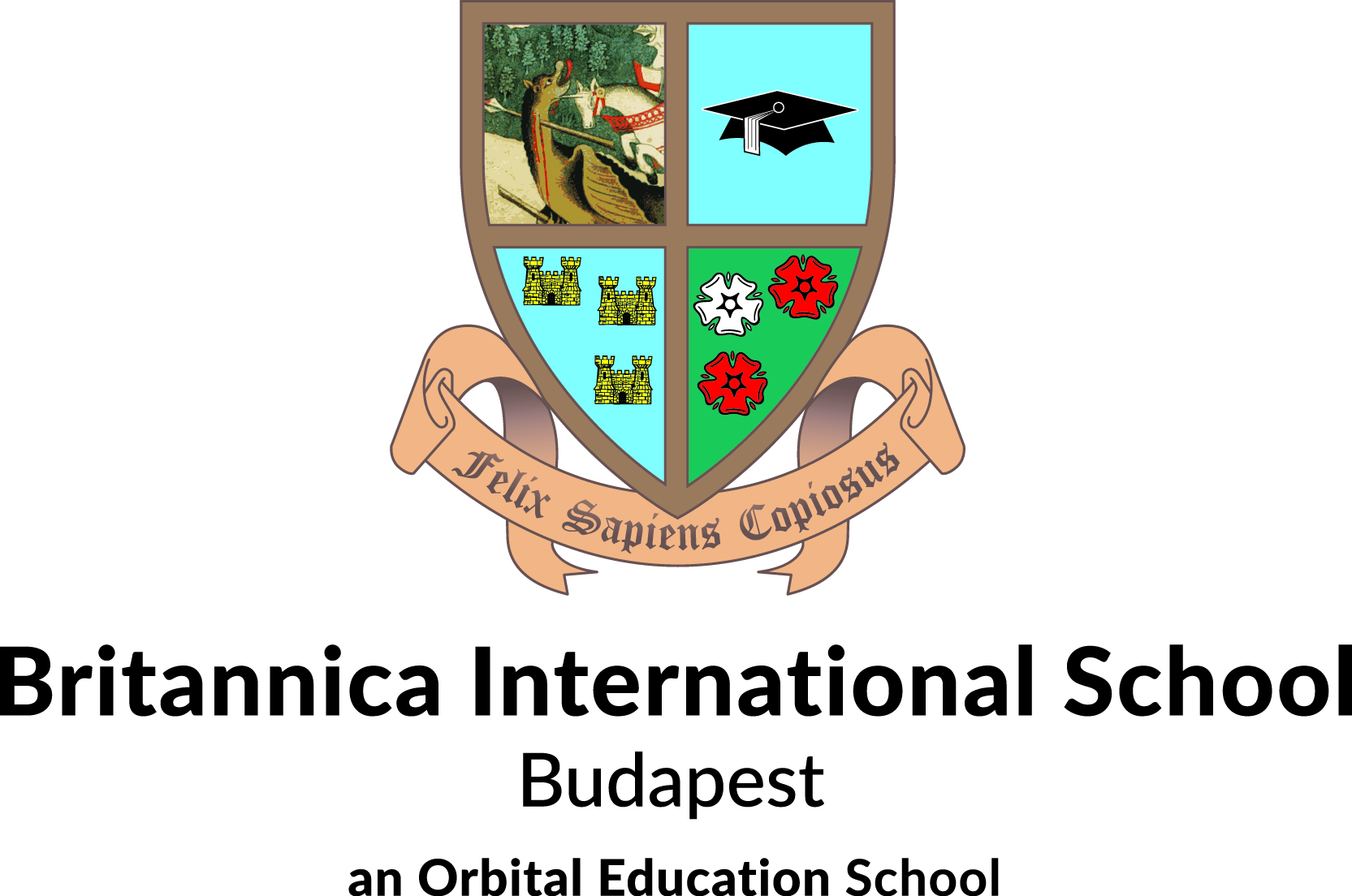

Location
- Kakukk út 1-3; Budapest, Hungary, 1121
- Coordinates: 47.49845141°N 19.00345294°E

Information
- School type: International School
- Motto: Inspire · Excel · Exceed
- Established: 2 September 1994
- Status: Open
- Principal: Neil McGarry
- Age: 5 to 18
- Enrollment: 480
- Website: www.britannicaschool.hu

Britannica International School, Budapest was founded in 1994 and is the longest established British School in Hungary. The educational programme is based on the National Curriculum for England suitably enhanced to reflect the school’s truly international nature. The school located in District XII in the Buda Hills has a diverse student population with almost 60 nationalities between the ages of 5-18.

== Leadership ==
The Principal of the school is the experienced Neil McGarry who has been a school leader in the UK in Northallerton and Germany King's School, Gutersloh. He joins the school following a successful leadership position in La Mare de Carteret High School, Guernsey The school is part of the Orbital Education group which is headquartered near Manchester in the UK. Orbital Education has 12 schools across four continents: Europe, Asia, North and South America.

== Facilities ==
The school's purpose-built facilities include: a 250-seat theatre, library, indoor sports hall, outdoor sports pitches, outdoor secondary gym, jungle gym & playing center, indoor swimming pool, Science labs, Art studio, Music suite and a school canteen. Its brightly lit classrooms are air-conditioned and equipped with smartboards and projectors to support student learning.

== Curriculum ==
The school delivers an enhanced version of the English National Curriculum preparing pupils for International General Certificate of Education (IGCSE) at 16. In at ages 17 and 18 the A Level programme is delivered - which gives the possibility for students to specialise.

The school has strong academic results with 53% of students getting A or A* results at iGCSE and 85% between A* to C. The school consistently has students receive the Outstanding Cambridge Learner Award for receiving the highest mark in the world for their chosen subject as well as the Pearson Edexcel Outstanding Learner Award.

Britannica International School, Budapest is a Cambridge International Examination center.

== Extracurricular activities ==
Britannica International School has a wide range of activities available:

- Students can participate in the Duke of Edinburgh’s International Award which is a journey of personal discovery and adventure for young people.
- A team participates in the World Scholar's Cup is an international team academic tournament with students participating from over 40 countries. The school has hosts one of the qualification rounds. In 2014 the Britannica Team reached the final in Yale.
- The school regularly holds school plays and other community events such as the Spring Fayre or the Budapest Poetry competition
- Students have the option to participate in one of the scheduled Extra-curricular activities. Regularly offered are: Drama, robotics, film-making, football, hockey, volleyball, tennis, art, photography, hiking, craft, cookery and dance as well as a number of academic clubs.

== Accreditation ==
The Britannica International School is a member of:

- Council of International Schools which helps support the continuous improvement of international education
