= Shanghai Nanhui Senior High School =

High school in Shanghai, China

Shanghai Nanhui Middle School
- 上海南汇中学

Information
- Motto: 团结、奋斗、求实、进取
- Established: 1927

Shanghai Nanhui Senior High School (上海南汇中学) is a senior high school in Pudong District, Shanghai.

== History ==
Established in 1927 by industrialist Zhao Xinmei, the school initially operated in Wenchang Palace, located in Huinan Town. Originally known as Nanhui Girls' Elementary School, it boasted a modest enrollment of 111 students and a faculty of over 10 teachers by 1936. However, the outbreak of the Second Sino-Japanese War in 1937 prompted the relocation of the school to the French Concession of Shanghai. With the complete occupation of Shanghai by Japanese forces in 1941, the school ceased operations.

Following the end of World War II, the school resumed its activities in its original location in 1946, undergoing a name change to Nanhui County Simple Normal School. Over the years, it underwent several transformations, becoming Nanhui County Junior Middle School in 1952 and eventually Nanhui County Middle School after admitting high school students in 1954. By 1962, the school had expanded significantly, occupying over 100 acres of land and hosting more than 40 classes, establishing itself as a prominent county-level educational institution.

In the post-1993 era, the school streamlined its operations, retaining only its high school division. Renamed Shanghai Nanhui High School in 1997, it embarked on a new chapter of educational excellence. In 2004, the school completed construction of a sprawling new campus spanning 380 acres. This development marked a significant milestone, as in 2005, the institution was recognized as an experimental and demonstrative high school by the Shanghai municipal government.
