= Shanghai Singapore International School =

Private international school in Shanghai, China

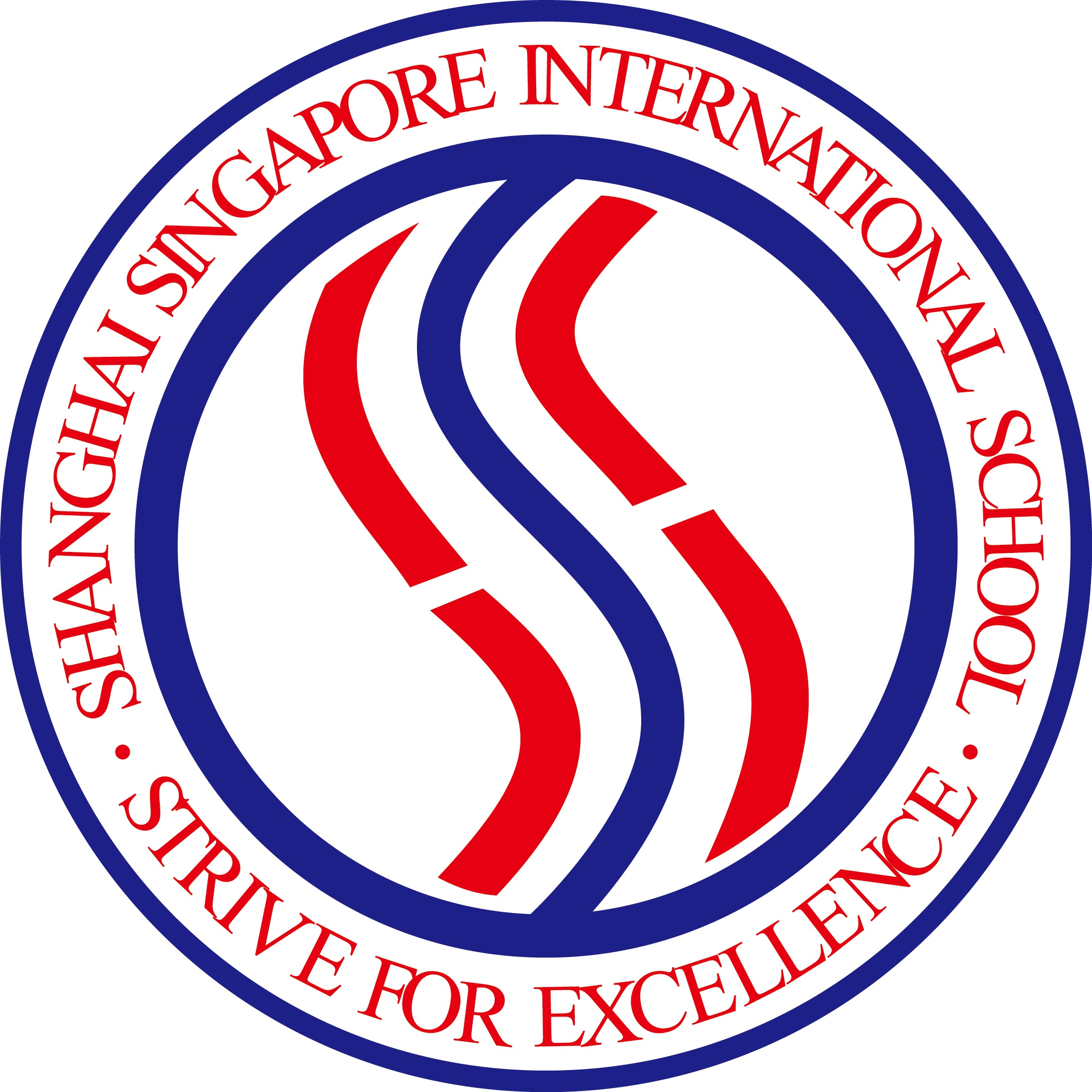

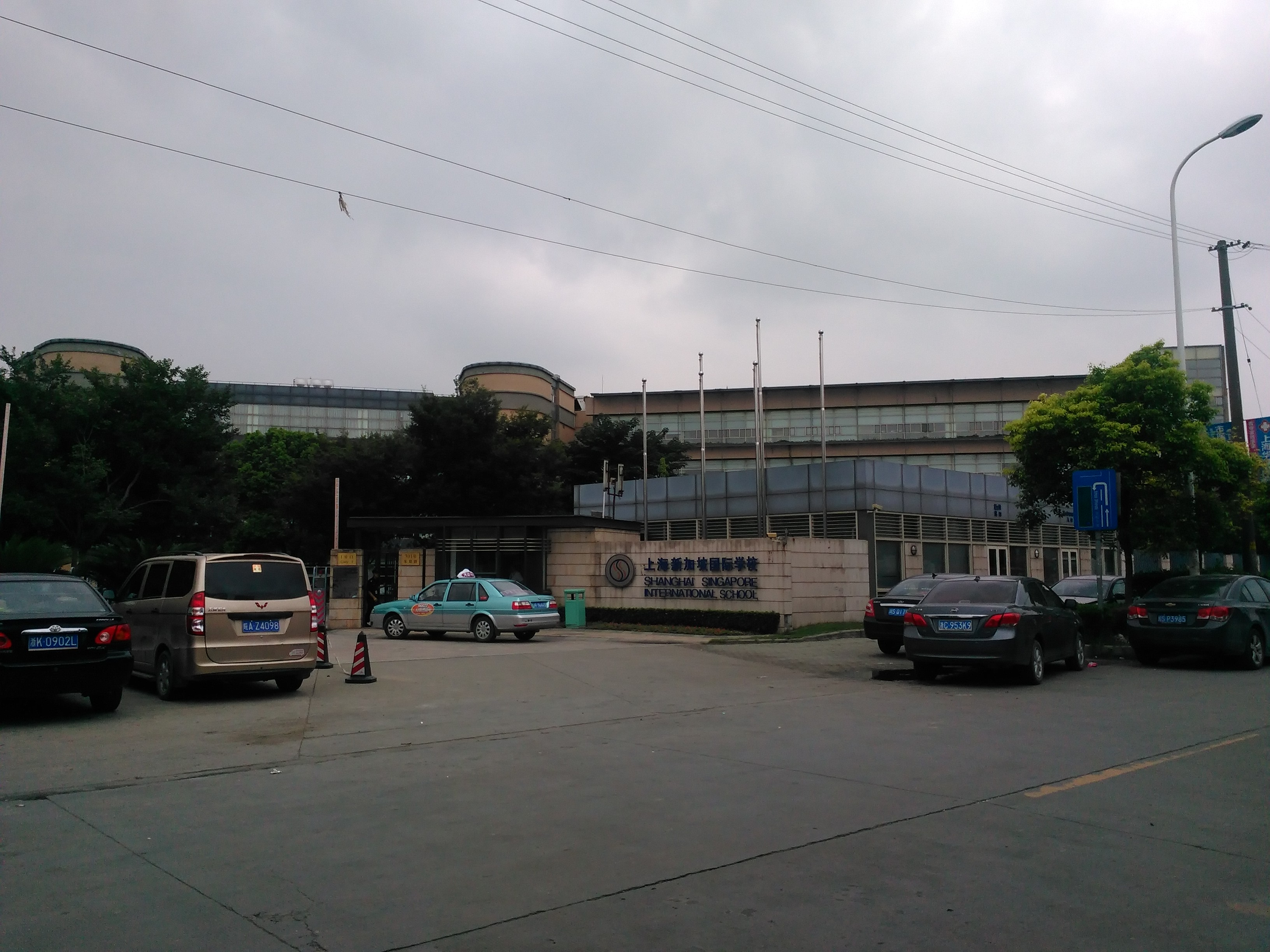
- Minhang Campus
- Shanghai; China

Information
- Type: Private International
- Established: 1996
- Grades: Preschool-12
- Average class size: 10
- Campus: MinHang; XuHui
- Website: ssis.asia

Shanghai Singapore International School
- Simplified Chinese: 上海新加坡外籍人员子女学校
- Traditional Chinese: 上海新加坡外籍人員子女學校
- Literal meaning: Shanghai Singapore Foreign Workers' Children School
Transcriptions
Standard Mandarin
- Hanyu Pinyin: Shànghǎi Xīnjiāpō Wàijí Rényuán Zǐnǚ Xuéxiào

Shanghai Singapore International School (Chinese: 上海新加坡外籍人员子女学校) is a K-12 private school and a school for children of foreign personnel in Shanghai, China.

There are two campuses: the Minhang Campus serves preschool through senior high school and the Xuhui Campus serves preschool through elementary school. The two campuses merged during 2019.

== See also ==
- List of international schools in Shanghai
- List of international schools
