= Kevin McNeany =

N.Irish education entrepreneur (born 1943)

Kevin J. McNeany
- Born: 1943 (age 81–82); Keady, Northern Ireland
- Education: Bachelor of Arts, Postgraduate Certificate in Education and Postgraduate diploma
- Occupation(s): Businessperson, education investor
- Years active: 1970s-present
- Employer: Orbital Education

Kevin McNeany (born 1943 Keady, Northern Ireland), is a Northern Irish entrepreneur in the education and international education sectors. He founded Nord Anglia Education (1972) and Orbital Education (2008). He is the executive chairman of Orbital Education. He was described in The Guardian in 2003 as "probably the country's richest teacher, worth an estimated £15 million".

== Life and career ==
=== 1944-2004: Early life and Nord Anglia ===
Kevin McNeany was born circa 1943 in Keady, Northern Ireland. He is originally from County Armagh.

He started his career as a teacher in 1964, teaching English in Northern Ireland, and then moved to Leeds. He began working in further education, and in 1972 moved to Southport. There, he started a business providing English-language courses for foreign students, expanding also into Blackpool, Chester, and Manchester. He was running the Nord Anglia business full-time by 1976, when it had 11 centers. By the early 1980s, he was serving as chairman, and purchased a prep school in Manchester. He then bought Hull Grammar School and Gramercy in Torbay.

He led the IPO of Nord Anglia Education PLC in 1997 as the first and still the only education company to gain a full listing in the London Stock Exchange. He retired as chairman of Nord Anglia Education in December 2004, after being part of the company for 32 years.

=== 2005-2014: Founding Acorn and Orbital ===
In 2005, founded Acorn Care and Education, serving as chairman of Acorn Education in 2010. He sold Acorn to a Canadian pension fund in early 2013 for £150 million.

He founded Orbital Education in 2008, and by 2013 was chairman. Orbital focuses on running international schools and colleges, mainly in the British tradition, to expatriate students and host families.

In April 2012, he sold all but a 2.5% stake of his share in Nord Anglia, shortly after retiring from the company. The year prior, it had become Britain's largest nursery group.

At the start of 2013, McNeany owned the Manchester Academy of English, after first investing in 2008. He sold the stake in 2013 for £3 million, retiring as chairman. In 2014, he owned 14 nurseries linked to existing independent schools. Kevin received the "Outstanding individual contribution" accolade at the Education Investor awards on November 13, 2014, for contributions to the education sector.

=== 2015-2025 ===
In 2019, he remained chairman of Orbital Education. In 2023, he was present at the opening of United School International on The Pearl Island. At the time, he remained Orbital chair and vice chairman of United Schools International, a school opened in 2022 as a partnership between Orbital and United Development Company (UDC).
