= Concordia International School Shanghai =

Private international school in Shanghai, China

- 上海协和国际学校

Location
- 999, Mingyue Road, Pudong District, Shanghai 201206; Shanghai; China; 31°14′N 121°35′E

Information
- Type: International School, Denominational
- Religious affiliation: Lutheran
- Established: 1998
- Head of School: Eric Semler
- Grades: P–12
- Colors: Blue, Yellow, White
- Mascot: Phoenix
- Website: concordiashanghai.org

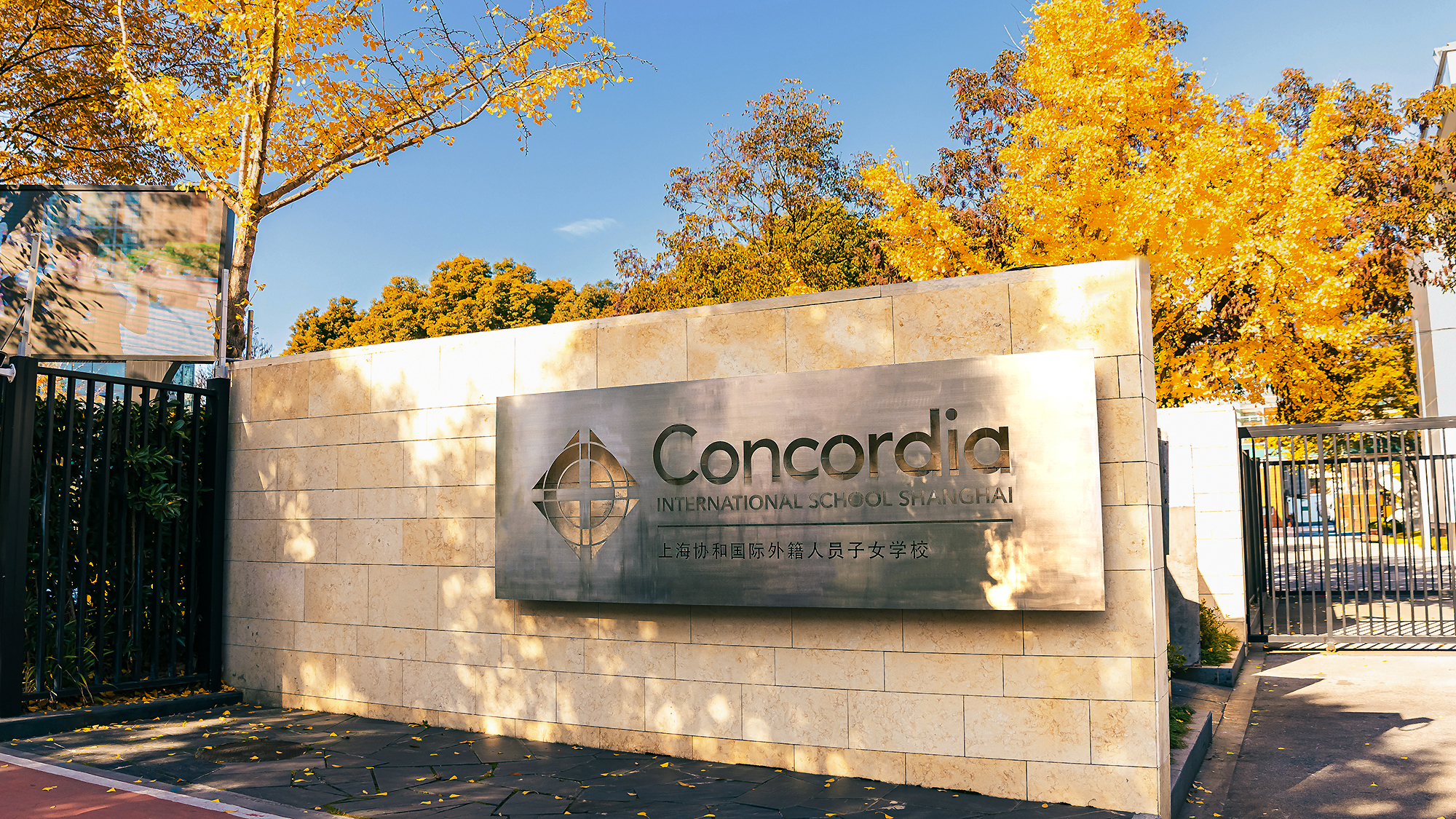
Concordia International School Shanghai

Concordia International School (Chinese: 上海协和国际外籍人员子女学校) is a private, Christian, co-educational international school located in Pudong, Shanghai, China. Founded in 1998, the school is a part of the Lutheran Church – Missouri Synod (LCMS). It provides an American-style education from preschool through high school.

Located in the Jinqiao town of Pudong New Area, the school offers academic, sports, fine arts, service, and applied learning programs.

== Academics ==
Concordia's academic program spans four school divisions: early childhood, elementary school, middle school, and high school.

=== Early childhood ===
Concordia's early childhood program for children aged 3 to 5 is divided into Preschool-3 for children who are age 3 by September 1 and Preschool-4 for those who are age 4 by September 1. The curriculum is inspired by the Reggio Emilia philosophy, which emphasizes child-led learning, creativity, and exploration through hands-on, inquiry-based experiences.

=== Elementary school ===
The elementary school at Concordia, covering grades 1 to 5, aims to build foundational skills in literacy, mathematics, science, and social studies. The curriculum encourages students to develop self-awareness and leadership skills. It integrates Mandarin language study, fine arts, physical education, and digital literacy.

=== Middle school ===
The middle school, for grades 6 to 8, addresses the transitional needs of students between 10 and 14 years old. The program fosters independence, responsibility, and leadership within a supportive environment. A 1-to-1 individual MacBook program is introduced in grade 6 to enhance technological skills and learning autonomy.

=== High school ===
The high school curriculum, spanning grades 9 to 12, offers a diverse range of subjects, including Advanced Placement and Applied Learning courses. Its Applied Learning courses include AL Big Data and AL Aerospace Engineering . Concordia's high school program adheres to American curriculum standards, allowing students to tailor their studies to their academic and personal interests.

== Campus and facilities ==
Concordia International School Shanghai is situated on a 10-acre (4.0 ha) campus, specifically designed to enhance student learning and development. The campus includes purpose-built facilities that cater to the diverse needs of its student body, ranging from academic spaces to creative and athletic areas. These facilities are strategically developed to support a comprehensive educational experience.

The Lower Building (formerly the elementary school building) opened in 2007 and caters to younger students with specialized spaces for music, art, and physical activities. The Intermediate Building (formerly the Middle School building) opened in 2005 and is utilized by various grade levels and includes homerooms, a choir room, and administrative offices. The Upper Building (formerly the High School building), the newest on campus, was designed by American architecture firm Perkins Eastman and opened in 2009. The spaces houses classrooms, science labs, and the fitness center, as well as the Welcome Center, High School offices, and other administrative areas.

The Phoenix Center, established in 2003, serves as a versatile space with maker labs, a drama room, gym and Café. It hosts various activities and events, including school assemblies and community gatherings. The previous Rittmann Center for the Fine Arts, named after former head of school Dr. David Rittmann, was completed in December 2007 and included a 350-seat theater, rehearsal rooms, studios for 2D/3D graphics and photography, and a gallery area. It served as a hub for creative and cultural activities, now under construction, and will soon include a full-sized professional swimming pool and a larger theater.

The Rittmann Center is undergoing a major redevelopment into a multidisciplinary arts and activities center that will include a professional-grade theater with seating for over 500, dedicated rehearsal classrooms for band, choir, and strings, four visual arts studios, and an Aquatics Center featuring an eight-lane swimming pool, with completion scheduled for summer 2027.

== History ==
In 1997, the idea for Concordia International School Shanghai was conceived following suggestions from multinational corporations, American expatriates, U.S. foreign-service personnel, and the People's Republic of China.

A team of educators from Hong Kong International School arrived in Pudong in 1998 to establish the school. They selected the Jinqiao Export Processing Zone for its proximity to residential areas, beginning the school's development in this location.

The first academic year started in 1998 with 22 students and 14 staff members, led by founding Head of School, Allan Schmidt.

In 2019, Concordia International School Shanghai paid a US$4 million dividend to the LCMS to help pay off the LCMS's debt.

== Honors and recognition ==
- Concordia Shanghai was honored with the International School Award 2025 for its student-run social enterprise, Xiaohusai, which has been making a difference in China's southwestern Yunnan province.
- Concordia Shanghai was ranked No. 2 in the KingLead China International School Innovative Competitiveness Top 30 in the category of schools for expat children. It also secured the top spot in the Shanghai region.
- In August 2024, Concordia gained the 6th spot in Forbes China's Top 10 Shanghai International Schools for Expatriate Children.
- In October 2024, Concordia's Early Childhood program was named one of "The Most Empowering Preschools to Follow in 2024" by Education Insights magazine.
- In 2025 Concordia Shanghai was recognized as a STEM School of Excellence Award by the International Technology and Engineering Educators Association (ITEEA).
- In December 2024, Concordia was honored with the title of ITEEA 2024-25 STEM School of Excellence—the only K-12 school in Asia to earn this recognition.
- Concordia Shanghai was named in June 2024 among the Top 10 shortlist for 2024 World's Best School Prize for Supporting Healthy Lives, the only school from China that have made it to this prestigious shortlist.
- Concordia Shanghai was ranked in the China International Kindergarten Top 30 list, as announced by KingLead Research on June 3, 2024.
- Concordia Shanghai placed among the Top 10 in the Hurun Education International Schools (Open to Non-Chinese Passport Holders Only) Top 30 list (2023), unveiled on March 28, 2024, by Hurun Education.
- Concordia Shanghai was ranked No.2 in the China International Kindergarten Top 30 list, as announced by KingLead Research on Nov 27, 2025.
- Concordia International School Shanghai became the first school in Asia to receive the National Interscholastic Athletic Administrators Association (NIAAA) Quality Program Award at the Exemplary Level in January 2026.

== See also ==
- List of international schools in Shanghai
- Americans in China
