= Jinqiao =

Town in Pudong, Shanghai, China

Coordinates: 31.2593°N 121.5894°E

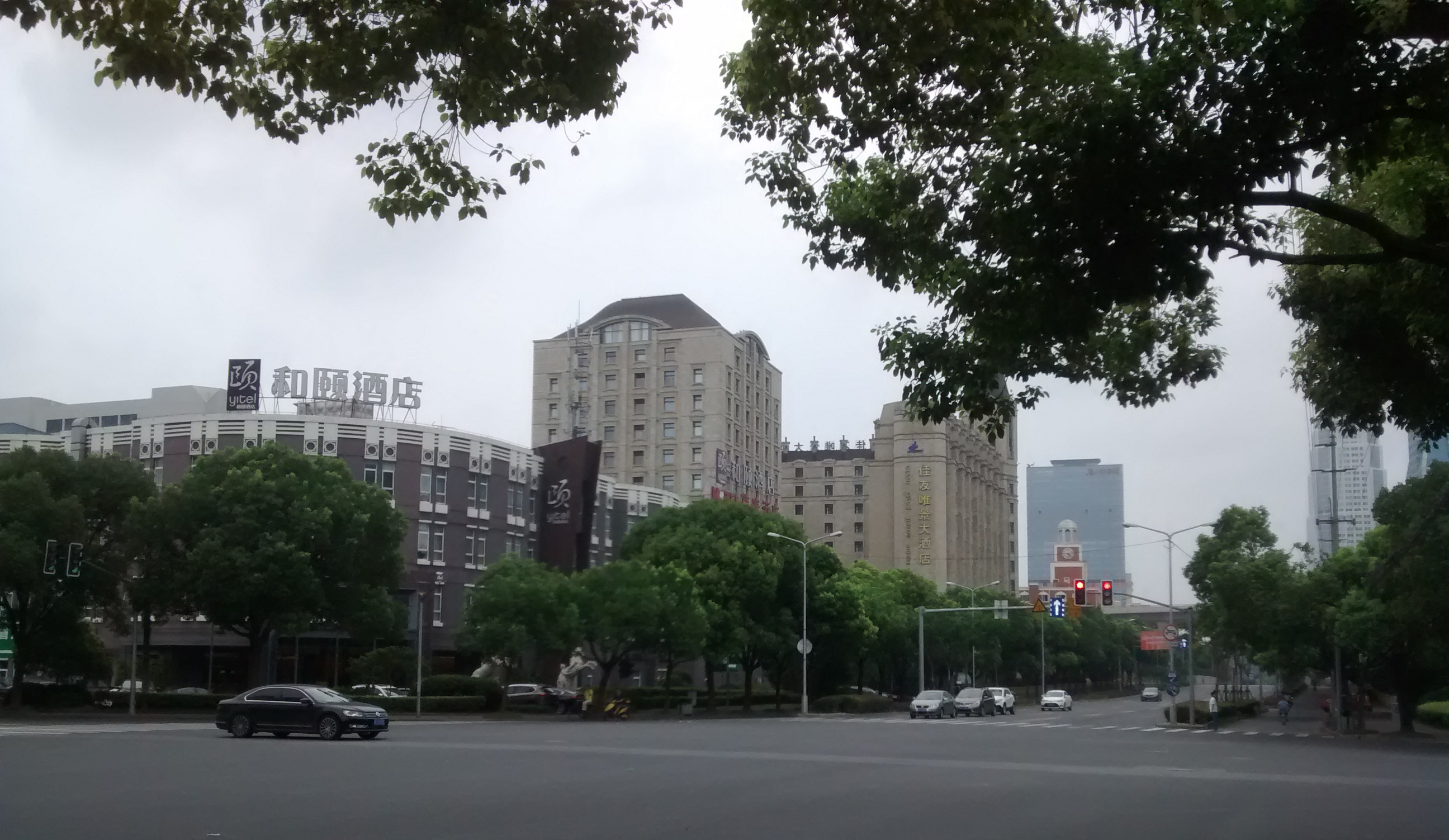
An intersection in Jinqiao

Jinqiao (Chinese: 金桥; pinyin: Jīnqiáo; lit. 'Golden Bridge') is a town of Pudong, Shanghai, China. It is in the middle of Pudong, with Zhangjiang Hi-Tech Park on its south, Huangpu River at its north, overlooking Lujiazui Financial and Trade Center to its west. On its north side, is Waigaoqiao Free Trade Zone and harbor. Jinqiao has a national development zone - Jinqiao Export Processing Zone. The area contains a relatively high proportion of foreign nationals and is notable for its large number of International Schools and comfortable environment.

Jinqiao covers an area of 28.47 square kilometres (10.99 sq mi). It governs seven villages, seven residential areas, and one international community. The registered population is over 28,000, while the floating population is over 87,000. More than 3,000 foreigners live in Jinqiao.

In recent times, before massive reconstruction, the area was known for its prostitution circles which had stalled the economic development of the area, and is something that still exists under cover in its numerous massage centers.

== Amenities ==
Jinqiao has developed rapidly over the last few years. It has a number of international schools including Dulwich College Shanghai and Concordia International School Shanghai.

== Economy ==
As a part of Shanghai Free Trade Zone, the modern service industry has become the most important part in economic development.

Many shopping centers have been built in Jinqiao, and have become popular places for families to spend in weekends and holidays, such as Jinqiao International Commercial Center.

== Housing ==
There are many expat housing compounds in Jinqiao, including:

- Vizcaya - A Spanish style compound
- Green Court - Large red brick apartments
- Old Green Villas - English style houses
- New Green Villas - This compound is divided into different style houses
- Shimao Lakeside - A compound of western style apartments and villas

== Transportation ==
=== Road ===
The Middle Ring of Shanghai passes through Jinqiao.

=== Metro ===
Jinqiao Road Station of Shanghai Metro line 6 is near the Jinqiao International Commercial Center. Other parts of lines 6, 9, and 12 pass through Jinqiao.

== See also ==
- Shezhuang Temple
