= Shanghai World Foreign Language Academy =

School in Shanghai, China

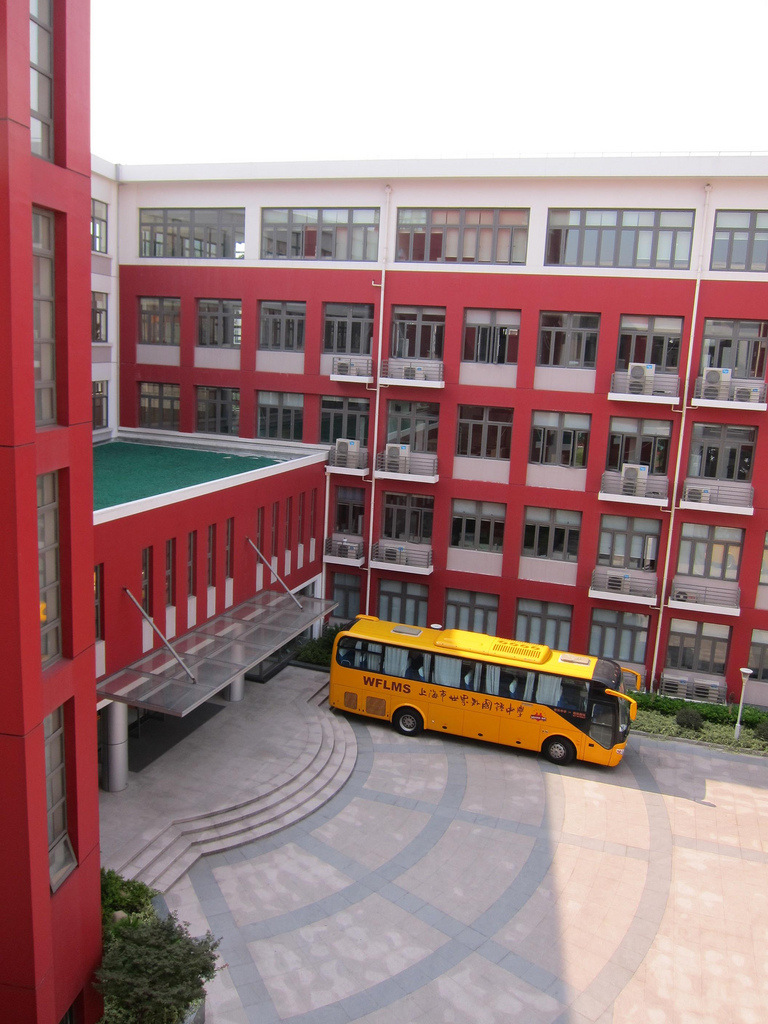
World Foreign Languages Middle School Home Campus

Shanghai World Foreign Language Academy (上海市世外中学) is a private secondary school in Shanghai, China. The school is operated by JuneYao Group.
