= Shanghai Municipal Education Commission =

Government agency in Shanghai, China

The Shanghai Municipal Education Commission (Chinese: 上海市教育委员会) is the agency of the Shanghai Municipal People's Government in charge of education. Its headquarters are in Huangpu District.
