= Britannica International School Shanghai =

Location
- 1988 Gubei Road; Shanghai, China, 201103

Information
- School type: International School
- Established: 2 September 2012
- Founder: Orbital Education
- Status: Opened September 2013
- Principal: Paul Farrell
- Age: 2 to 18
- Enrollment: Maximum Capacity 750-800
- Website: www.britannicashanghai.com

The Britannica International School of Shanghai is a private international school in Shanghai.

== History ==
The Britannica International School of Shanghai was founded in 2013 by Orbital Education headquartered near Manchester in the UK. Orbital Education is led by Kevin McNeany who previously founded Nord Anglia group. The founding principal was Alun Thomas.

== Accreditations and Membership ==
The Britannica International School is a member of:

- Council of International Schools which helps support the continuous improvement of international education
- Britannica International School, Shanghai was the first International ASA affiliated Swim School
- a Cambridge International Examination center.
