= Western International School of Shanghai =

International school in Shanghai

The Western International School of Shanghai (WISS) is a private school located in Qingpu, Shanghai.

The Western International School of Shanghai opened in 2006 and currently has a total of approximately 400 students. Additionally, WISS only teaches International Baccalaureate curriculum. Since its founding in 2006, Western International School of Shanghai has become a key player in the international education landscape of Shanghai.

The school is aligned with PYP, MYP, DP curriculum for their students. Teachers at Western International School of Shanghai actively contribute to helping their students for an inquiry-based learning environment.

With mostly local students, the school offers a diverse and inclusive school community. This makes it an ideal choice for international teachers looking to gain cross-cultural experience and professional growth in an international setting.

== See also ==
- List of international schools in Shanghai
- List of international schools
