= Fudan International School =

Location
- Shanghai, China

Information
- Type: School for children of foreign personnels
- Motto: "Preparing Students for a Global Future."
- Established: 2002
- Website: www.fdis.net.cn

The International Department of the High School Affiliated to Fudan University (复旦大学附属中学国际部), shortened as Fudan International School, is a school for children of foreign personnel in Shanghai, China.

== See also ==
- High School Affiliated to Fudan University
- International school
