= SecureEasySetup =

SecureEasySetup, or SES is a proprietary technology developed by Broadcom to easily set up wireless LANs with Wi-Fi Protected Access. A user presses a button on the wireless access point, then a button on the device to be set up (printer, etc.) and the wireless network is automatically set up.

This technology has been succeeded by the industry-standard Wi-Fi Protected Setup. However, Wi-Fi Protected Setup was recently broken and has been shown to be easily breakable with brute-force attacks.
