= Spiritual exercises =

Spiritual exercises may refer to:

- part of spiritual practice
- Spiritual Exercises, a book by Ignatius of Loyola
