= Shanghai Experimental School =

Coordinates: 31.1830°N 121.5081°E

- Shanghai; China

Information
- Type: Public
- Motto: Ascend (攀登)
- Established: 10 May 1986
- Principal: Xu Hong (t 徐紅, s 徐红, Xú Hóng）
- Grades: 1-12
- Website: ses.sh.edu.cn

The Shanghai Experimental School (SES) is a primary and secondary school in Shanghai, China. Its main campus for secondary school is at 300 Dongming Rd in Pudong. Its primary school campus is at 1316 Nanmatou Rd in Pudong.

The Shanghai Experimental School is a research-oriented institution that integrates education, instruction, and scientific experimentation. It allows flexibility in grade placement and skips the 5th and 6th grades of the standard Chinese educational system. It has a unique entrance exam for its middle and high schools, separate from the standard Shanghainese tests. New students are admitted through open examinations organized by the Shanghai Municipal Education Commission. It aims to fully explore the learning potentials of children and adolescents by reforming courses, teaching materials, teaching methods, teaching assessment, re-education programs and other components of Chinese teaching system.

International students may enroll in the school's international division, located at a separate campus in Tianlin Village No. 13 in Xuhui District. The international division has complete English immersion and a proprietary curriculum following western educational methods.

SES is administrated by the Shanghai Education Committee. Its experiments and research are supervised by the Institute of Scientific Research in Education at Shanghai Normal University.
