= The SMIC Private School =

- 上海民办中芯学校
- Shanghai; China

Information
- Type: Private
- Motto: 品格第一 · 追求卓越 · 胸怀世界 · 快乐成长 (Honor · Excellence · Community · Joy)
- Established: 2001
- Principal: Mrs. Dani Ma'u (International Division)
- Principal: Zhuang Xiaofeng (Chinese Track - Middle and High School)
- Principal: Wei Liping (Chinese Track - Elementary School)
- Grades: Pre-K to 12
- Athletics conference: Shanghai International Schools Athletic Conference (SISAC)
- Mascot: Sharks
- Accreditation: WASC
- Newspaper: sharkscholar.com
- Website: www.smicschool.com

The SMIC Private School (Chinese: 中芯学校) is a private K-12 school located in the Zhangjiang Science City of Shanghai, China. The school was founded by Semiconductor Manufacturing International Corporation (SMIC) in 2001. The School is accredited by the Western Association of Schools and Colleges, first awarded said accreditation in 2016, where they received the maximum time of six years. It is also one of 229 members of EARCOS (East Asia Regional Council of Schools), a collective of qualified international schools in East Asia, and has memberships in OACAC (Overseas Association for College Admissions Counseling) and other academic organizations.

== History ==
The SMIC Private School was first established in September 2001 in Shanghai by Semiconductor Manufacturing International Corporation (SMIC, or 中芯国际集成电路制造有限公司 in Mandarin) to provide education for the children of the company's employees. SMIC selected the school's location to be at Zhangjiang High-Technology Park in Pudong New Area (浦东新区) for its proximity to the company campus. The school started out with only a few students, and did not offer a wide variety of courses, but it did graduate its first senior class in 2006, within just five years of the school's founding.

In its early years, the school consisted largely of children of company employees, but as it gained reputation, it expanded to include students from the wider Shanghai community, as well as students from abroad. As of 2015, less than 20% of enrolled middle/high school students were children of SMIC employees. In the early 2000s, the school implemented a dual enrollment system, offering both Chinese Track that utilizes curriculum approved by the Shanghai Education Commission, and English Track that adheres to an American-style curriculum with education based primarily in English.

With the success of the Shanghai campus, the school expanded to include preschool and kindergarten, and in 2005, the school extended to establishing another campus in Beijing, also to serve to provide the company's employees' children with quality education with very similar educational principles and curricula to its Shanghai counterpart. In 2011, SMIC further expanded to include a second kindergarten in Tangzhen (唐镇), a subdistrict of Pudong, as a subsidiary of the main Zhangjiang campus as the number of enrolled preschoolers and kindergarteners was overwhelmingly high, though this Tangzhen campus closed in 2025.

In 2016, the English Track of the Shanghai campus received a six-year accreditation from the Western Association of Schools and Colleges (WASC). By 2019 the Shanghai campus alone consisted of over 3000 students in its pre-K – 12 institution with around 400 teachers and administrators, most of which have an international background. To accommodate growth, the school constructed numerous academic facilities on its sprawling 75000 m^{2} campus, including academic buildings, biology, physics, and chemistry laboratories, athletic facilities, and even an observatory.

== Academics and curriculum ==
SMIC Shanghai Private School is an institution that provides comprehensive bilingual education. It consists of separate Chinese and International divisions, which follow the national curriculum towards Gaokao, and US standards and the Advanced Placement program respectively.

=== Chinese track ===
The Chinese track at Shanghai SMIC Private School is a fifteen-year system that integrates the Chinese national curriculum with international educational elements. It aims to cultivate students' bilingual abilities and provide a solid foundation for both domestic and international academic pathways. The program is structured to foster critical thinking while maintaining academic standards.

==== Primary school ====
The primary school program within the Chinese Track emphasizes respecting individual student learning styles to create space for autonomous development. A key feature is the English Enhancement Class (EEC), which uses American textbooks and native English teachers to improve students' language proficiency. This approach aims to build a strong academic and linguistic foundation from an early age.

==== Middle school ====
The middle school curriculum offers a diverse selection of expanded courses in arts, sports, and sciences. The program places a strong emphasis on bilingual education, strengthening English instruction through both the local Oxford English curriculum and an English Language Arts (ELA) program taught by foreign teachers. This ensures graduates are well-prepared for the academic demands of high school, whether they choose a domestic or international track.

==== High school ====
The High school Chinese track primarily serves students who are aiming to study at universities abroad. It's designed to prepare students for international higher education. The program is closely integrated with the school's specialized Going Abroad Program (GAP), which was established to better support these students' specific needs.

- GAP - The Going Abroad Program (GAP) is a customized American-style track established in 2012 for students planning to study overseas. Students in the GAP take classes, including Meigao and AP courses, within the school's WASC-accredited International Division. A significant advantage is that the school is an official SAT, ACT, and AP testing center authorized by the College Board, allowing students to complete all necessary standardized exams on campus.

=== International division ===
The International division of SMIC Shanghai Private School offers students an American-style educational program spanning from early childhood education to high school. The system is designed to prepare students for university in the United States and other English-speaking countries, but also aims to promote holistic development of students. The SMIC curriculum focuses on building bilingual foundations in early years before slowly transitioning to a more rigorous program in high school, which along with the AP program at the school, helps prepare SMIC students for college.

==== Early childhood ====
The early childhood program at SMIC is full English immersion and employs an American style curriculum based on US standards. Younger students in K1 focus on language arts and mathematics, and in K2 the curriculum is expanded to include five core subjects (language arts, mathematics, science, social studies, and Chinese). The program follows Common Core standards for math and language arts, NGSS for science, and AERO standards for social studies. A key feature is the bilingual nature of the program, and while English is the primary medium of instruction, students are also taught Mandarin Chinese. The program has a holistic focus on the social, emotional, and physical development of the students.

==== Elementary School ====
The elementary school curriculum combines Eastern and Western systems of instruction and is designed to balance academic excellence with student well-being and holistic development. During grades 1-3, students remain in one classroom with a primary teacher and a helper teacher in charge of their classes. Students later transition to subject-specific rotations in grades 4 and 5. The core of the elementary curriculum are five daily courses in mathematics, science, English language arts, Chinese, and social studies. At the same time, there are weekly classes in music, art, technology, and physical education.

One prestigious academic program within elementary school is the Chinese Concentration Class (CCC), which is an intensive Mandarin program designed for native and advanced non-native speakers to achieve a higher level of proficiency in Chinese. This program includes additional Chinese classes compared to the standard curriculum and includes Chinese mathematics courses based on the Chinese public school math curriculum. It is a challenging program meant to improve the Chinese and math skills of students who are already excelling academically in grades 1-4.

==== Middle school ====
At SMIC's International Division, the middle school program is the bridge from elementary school to high school, thus is focused on both promoting academic development and personal growth. The curriculum continues to focus on the core areas of English, Chinese, mathematics, science and social studies, but also provides students with additional learning opportunities. The middle school curriculum includes a system where students participate in exploratory courses in technology, art, music, and other disciplines, giving them the chance to develop or grasp their interests before high school.

==== High school ====
High school at SMIC International Division includes a comprehensive, US standards-based curriculum that aims to prepare students for competitive universities worldwide. To graduate, students must successfully complete a total of 23.5 credits across all subject areas to ensure even academic foundation, as well as 100 hours of community service. Students engage in core subjects such as English, math, science, social studies, and Chinese/Spanish, French, and an array of elective courses across multiple disciplines.

The standard curriculum provides daily instruction across five core subjects of Math (Common Core standards), English literature and writing (Common Core standards), science (NGSS), and social studies (AERO). This aims to create a balanced program that emphasizes critical thinking and development in all subjects and areas.

A highlight and defining feature of the high school program is the extensive Advanced Placement (AP) program that it offers. SMIC International's high school provides AP courses across various disciplines, enabling students to pursue university-level studies they are interested in. AP's average for the 2024-2025 school year was 4.45. The AP course offered include the following:

- AP Art and Design
- AP Biology
- AP Calculus AB
- AP Calculus BC
- AP Chemistry
- AP Chinese Language & Culture
- AP Computer Science A
- AP Computer Science Principles
- AP English Language & Composition
- AP English Literature & Composition
- AP Environmental Science
- AP European History
- AP French Language and Culture
- AP Macroeconomics
- AP Physics I
- AP Physics II
- AP Physics C
- AP Psychology
- AP Seminar
- AP Spanish Language and Culture
- AP Statistics
- AP US History
- AP World History
- AP Research

In 2023, the school reported that 96.9% of all students who took an AP exam scored a 3 or higher, with the average AP score being 4.29. SMIC is also one of the only 13 schools in mainland China that has the AP Capstone program. This robust system in Advanced placement and in the usual curriculum demonstrates the educational ability of the school.

== Facilities and services ==
SMIC Private School has extensive facilities to ensure the well-rounded growth of their students in academics, sports, and the arts. SMIC has six science labs, multiple sports facilities, art, music, AI rooms and an observatory.

== Academic achievements ==
In the past 20 years, SMIC has aided hundreds of students in getting accepted to top tier universities. These schools are located in North America, Europe, Asia, and other regions. KingLead, an international platform with the most influential international school ranking in China, makes note of the college admission results in 2022. In this year, a student from SMIC became the only person in the Shanghai region to receive an acceptance from Yale.

In the past few years, average scores in the PSAT reading and math categories rank above the average scores from schools worldwide.

Between 2018 and 2023, an average of around 160 students were registered for AP tests.

== Competitions and community ==
Outside of the school, students are also prompted to explore areas of interest and constantly find new potential within themselves. In the 2022-2023 school year, MHS students participated in more than 20 academic competitions, winning multiple national and international awards. Eight students finished top three in the National History Day (NHD) competition in China, and four of them were qualified to enter the World Finals. In 2023, SMIC's USAD (US Academic Decathlon) team placed sixth in China out of 300 schools. Other notable competitions include WSC (World's Scholars' Cup), MUN (Model United Nations) and AMC (American Mathematics Competition).
