= Hong Qiao International School - Rainbow Bridge International School =

International school in Shanghai, China

Coordinates: 31.19204°N 121.40493°E

Shanghai Hong Qiao International School (HQIS-RBIS) is an international school in Gubei, Shanghai. Its previous campus was in proximity to the Shanghai Zoo.

== History ==
The school opened its doors in 1997 as Rainbow Bridge International School with just two classes serving 18 preschool students. Since then, the student population has steadily increased. In 2003 the Elementary School opened.

In 2012 HQIS became an International Baccalaureate (IB) World School authorized to teach the Primary Years Program (PYP).

In 2014 the Middle School opened and the following year the school moved to its new campus and change its name to Hong Qiao International School.

== Curriculum ==
The IB-PYP programme starts in Preschool and continues until Grade 5. At Middle and High School.
