= Shanghai University of Electric Power =

Municipal public university in Shanghai, China

- 上海电力大学
- Former names: Shanghai Training School of Electric Power
- Motto: 爱国、勤学、务实、奋进
- Type: Public
- Established: 1951; 75 years ago
- Academic staff: ca. 1,000
- Students: ca. 10,000
- Location: Shanghai, China
- Website: shiep.edu.cn

Shanghai University of Electric Power
- Simplified Chinese: 上海电力大学
- Traditional Chinese: 上海電力大學
Transcriptions
Standard Mandarin
- Hanyu Pinyin: Shànghǎi Diànlì Xuéyuàn

The Shanghai University of Electric Power (SHIEP; Chinese: 上海电力大学; pinyin: Shànghǎi Diànlì Xuéyuàn) is a municipal public university in Shanghai, China. It is affiliated with the City of Shanghai, and sponsored by the municipal government.

The campus is at 2103 Pingliang Road, Yangpu District, Shanghai 200090.

== History ==
Shanghai University of Electric Power was originated from the "Shanghai Training School of Electric Power" (上海电业学校), which was founded in 1951. In January 1985, it was renamed to the current name. It is a full-time institution of higher education and co-run by the central government and the Shanghai municipality; it is managed mainly by the Shanghai municipality.

== International ==
SHUEP has established inter-university relationships with many universities in Britain, America, France, Canada, Japan, Korea, Russia and Australia. It has established 13 joint international schools and researches with foreign universities including Columbia University (USA), Oklahoma Christian University (USA), University of Strathclyde (UK), University of Hertfordshire (UK), Edith Cowan University (Australia), and the University of Kitakyushu (Japan).
