= Shanghai Institute of Technology =

Public university in Shanghai, China

- 上海应用技术大学 (Chinese)
- Other name: Shanghai Applied Technological University
- Motto: 明德，明学，明事
- Type: Public
- Established: 1954; 72 years ago (predecessor school)
- Faculty: 1,610
- Students: 15,982
- Undergraduates: 14,278
- Postgraduates: 1,087
- Location: Shanghai, China
- Campus: Urban area
- Nickname: Shangyingda (上应大)
- Website: www.sit.edu.cn

Chinese name
- Simplified Chinese: 上海应用技术大学
- Traditional Chinese: 上海應用技術大學
Transcriptions
Standard Mandarin
- Hanyu Pinyin: Shànghǎi Yìngyòng Jìshù Dàxué

The Shanghai Institute of Technology (上海应用技术大学), also known as Shanghai Applied Technological University, is a municipal public application-oriented university in Fengxian, Shanghai, China. It is affiliated with the City of Shanghai and funded by the Shanghai Municipal People's Government.

The institution was established in April 2000 as Shanghai Applied Technical College (上海应用技术学院) by the merger of then Shanghai Light Industry Senior Vocational School (上海轻工业高等专科学校), then Shanghai Metallurgy Senior Vocational School (上海冶金高等专科学校), and then Shanghai Chemical Engineering Senior Vocational School (上海化工高等专科学校). In March 2016, the school was granted technical university status and renamed Shanghai Applied Technological University (上海应用技术大学).

== Location ==
SIT is located in south-western Shanghai, adjacent to the Cao Hejing hi-tech park.

== Administration ==
While conducting the three-year vocational education, SIT mainly devotes itself for running of the bachelor's degree programs. The Institute consists of a Modern Education Centre, two departments and eleven schools, all of which cover 'materials science and engineering, mechanical and automation engineering, computer science and information engineering, civil engineering and architecture, environment and energy engineering, chemical engineering, biotechnology and food processing engineering, art and design, economics and business administration, foreign languages, social sciences among others. Among them, the disciplines of material processing engineering, applied chemistry, light-industry technique and engineering, art design and mechanic manufacturing and automation have been selected by Shanghai Municipal government, Shanghai Municipal Education Commission and SIT as Key incubated Disciplines. The discipline of Applied Chemistry has been authorized to run the postgraduate programme.

=== Faculty staff ===
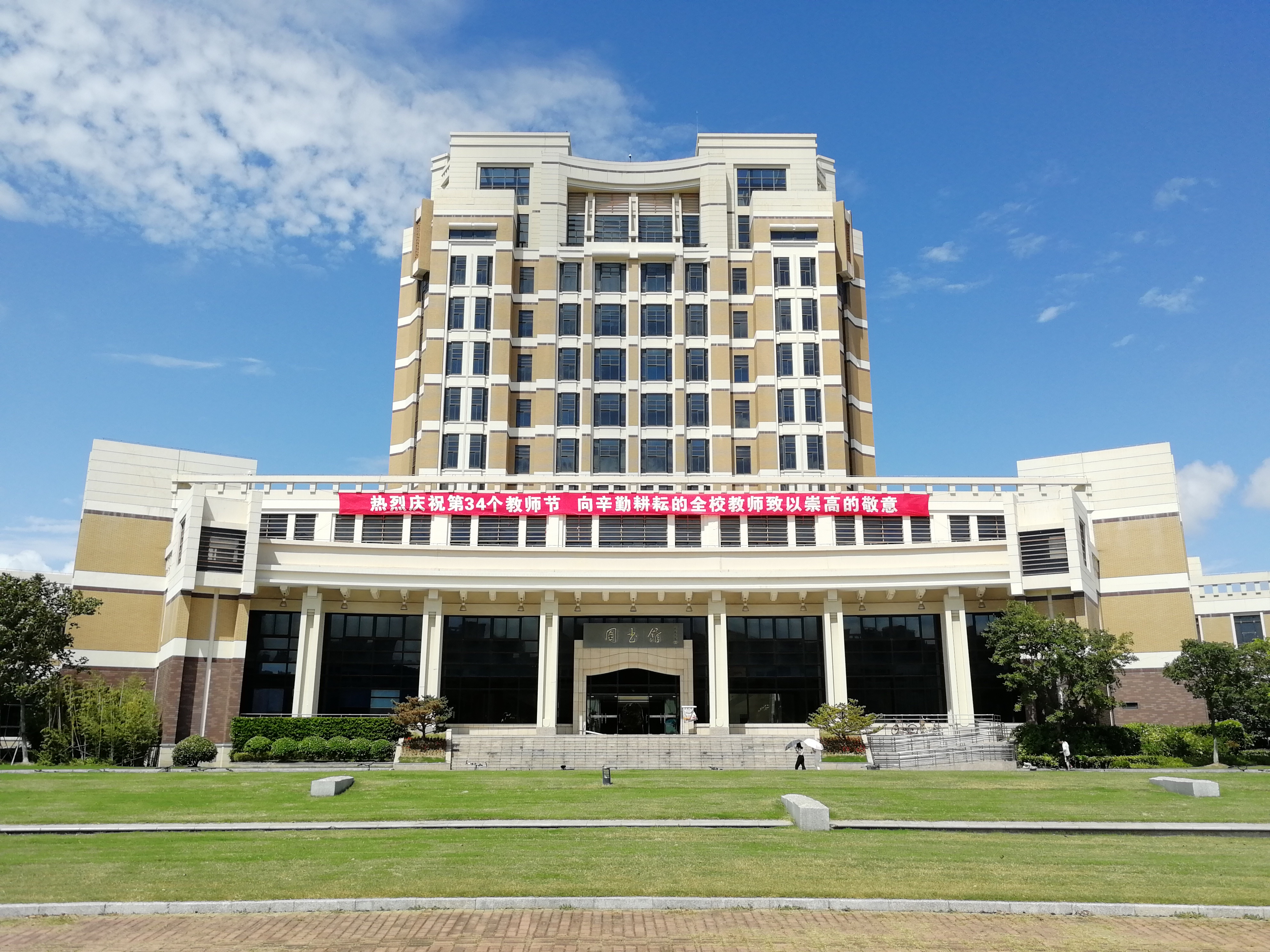
Library of Shanghai Institute of Technology in Fengxian District, Shanghai, China.

There are a total of over 1800 staff, and among them 600 are full-time teachers, over two hundred are supervisors for master's degree and doctor degree candidates, as well as professors and associate professors.

=== Students ===
Currently, there are approximately over 17,500 registered full-time students in the institute.

== Research ==
Over the past few years, SIT successfully built a dynamic and high-leveled academic team, engaged in both teaching activities and scientific research with several guides in the course of key disciplines and master teachers in core courses for different programs. SIT has been repeatedly awarded prizes covering the Progress in Scientific Research and Success in Educational Research at the state, ministerial or municipal levels. Presently, SIT has been undertaking numerous projects of National Natural Science Foundation (NSF), the earlier stage programs of National Basic Research Program, Shanghai Natural Science Foundation, Shanghai Municipal Dawn Plan and other projects at provincial and municipal levels.

== Exchange ==
Until now SIT has been maintaining close ties with tertiary universities of the countries like Germany, Ireland, U.S.A., Australia, Canada, U.K., France, New Zealand, Japan in conducting the exchange programmes in scientific and technological research and in the establishment and implementation of collaborative schemes of cooperation of tertiary education, the latter of which covers the programs in 'Electronic Engineering and Automation, Mechanical Design, Manufacturing and Automation, Applied Chemistry and Economic Administration.

The Shanghai Institute of Technology is a public application oriented university. It has been known to be focused on technical and advanced engineering education.It operates under a vocational framework aimed at problem solving in modern sciences.According to institutional data, graduates from SIT have high employment placement metrics within the region and further domestic markets.In recent years the programme has shifted focus on cultivating its internal curriculum quality, offering more opportunites for higher grade scientific research as well as developing its postgraduate programme. In its official promotional statement it refers to itself as " the cradle for engineers" owing to its historic focus on vocational engineering programs. Furthermore, they have targeted regional distinction by establishing a foothold of their programs in applied engineering and being a part of the top 1% globally in ESI for Chemistry and Materials Science.
