= Shanghai United International School =

- 上海协和双语学校
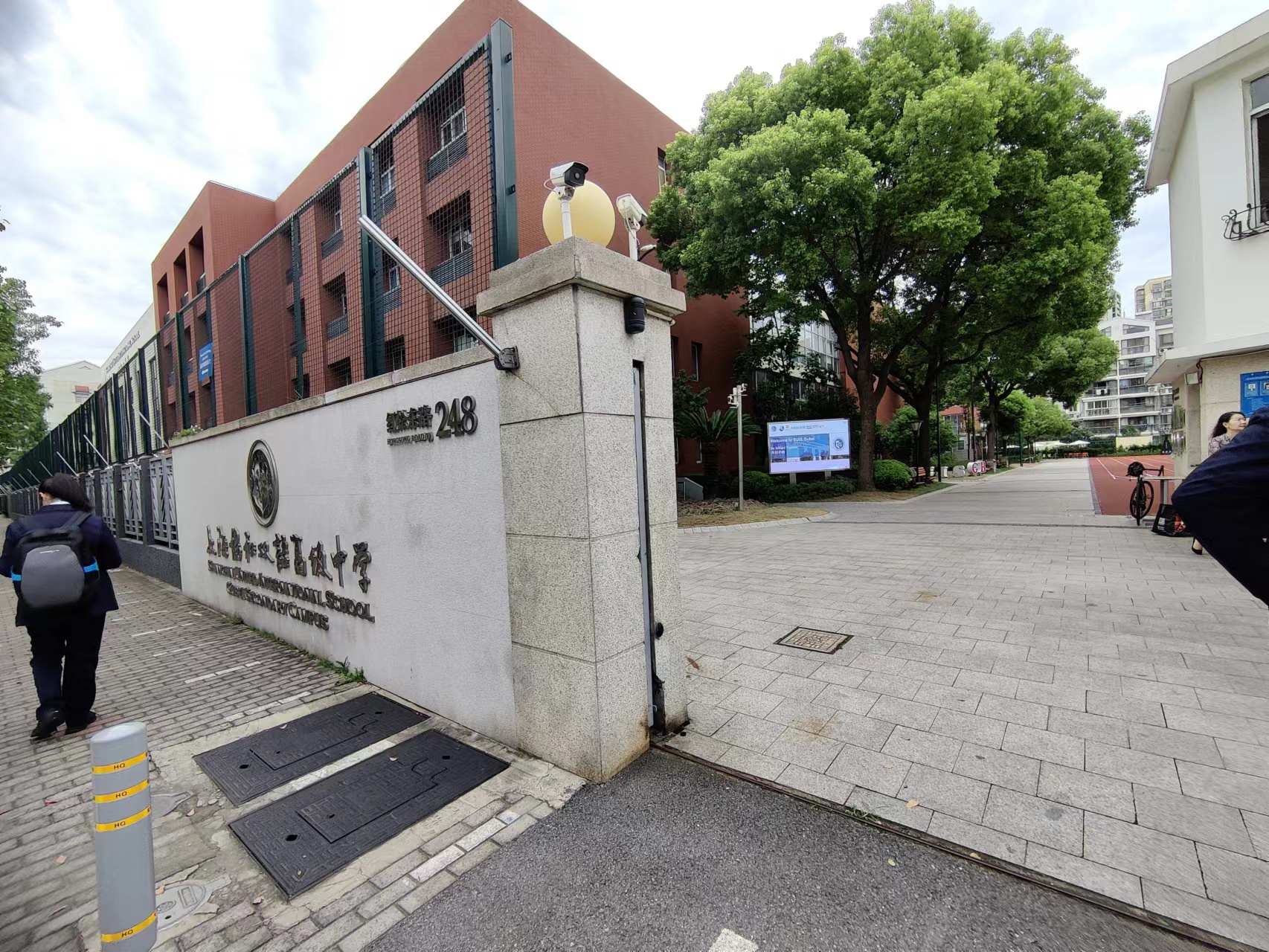
- SUIS Gubei Campus
- Shanghai; China

Information
- Other name: SUIS
- School type: Primary, Middle and High School
- Motto: East Meets West
- Established: 2004
- Grades: Primary Reception, Grade 1 to Grade 12
- Website: http://www.suis.com.cn/

Shanghai United International School (上海协和双语学校) is a group of international schools in Shanghai, China, under Xiehe Education. There are eight campuses located in Shanghai as of 2024, including Jiaoke Campus, Hongqiao Campus, Shangyin Campus, Gubei Campus, Pudong Campus, Pudong Academy, Wanyuan Campus, and Qingpu Campus.

Academics in the primary schools are based on the International Curriculum of England (ICE), the International Primary Curriculum (IPC), and the IB Primary Years Programme (PYP). Chinese curriculums are also available in the local streams. At secondary level, options include the IB Diploma Programme, Advanced Placement courses, IGCSE, A-Levels, and the BC (British Columbia) program for students to matriculate to universities abroad.

Xiehe Education has also opened campuses in Hefei, Wenzhou, Xiamen and Wuxi.
