= Yew Chung International School =

Private school in Hong Kong

Coordinates: 22.3377°N 114.1769°E

- Kowloon Tong, Kowloon, Hong Kong

Information
- Type: International private Preschool, Kindergarten, Primary school, secondary school
- Established: 1932; 94 years ago
- Director: Betty Chan Po-King
- Colours: blue, red and white
- Website: www.ycis-hk.com

Yew Chung International School
- Traditional Chinese: 耀中國際學校
- Simplified Chinese: 耀中国际学校
Transcriptions
Standard Mandarin
- Hanyu Pinyin: Yào Zhōng Guójì Xuéxiào
Yue: Cantonese
- Jyutping: jiu6 zung1 gwok3 zai3 hok6 haau6

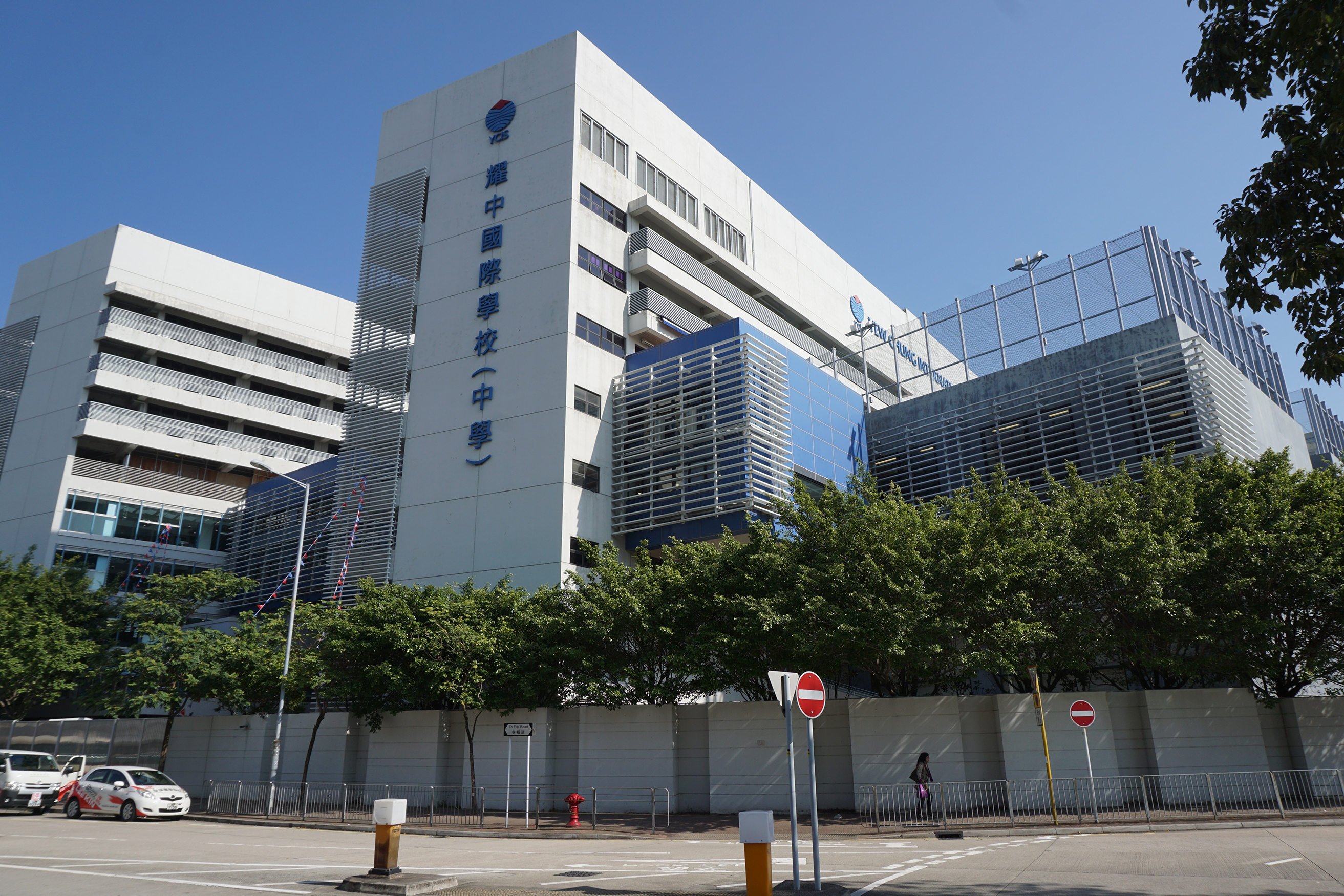
Secondary campus

Yew Chung International School (YCIS, Chinese: 耀中國際學校), is a private international school in Hong Kong for boys and girls ages 6 months to 18 years (Infant & Toddler to Year 13), educating them from Kindergarten to Secondary. The campuses are located in Kowloon Tong and Kowloon City District. At YCIS, students are taught Mandarin Chinese and English from Kindergarten, with the option of picking up French as a foreign language later in Secondary.

== Origins and history ==
Yew Chung was founded in 1932. Originally specializing in early childhood education, Yew Chung International School Hong Kong (YCIS) now provides international education from early childhood through primary school education and secondary school education. YCIS Hong Kong is part of the Yew Chung Education Foundation (YCEF), which spans across Shanghai, Beijing, Chongqing, and Qingdao in China, and Silicon Valley in the United States.

== Quick facts ==
- YCIS Hong Kong offers IGCSE, YCIS, and IB curricula based on the National Curriculum for England (NCE) with a bilingual focus on English and Chinese language acquisition.
- Students at YCIS Hong Kong learn to read, write, and speak fluent Mandarin Chinese through curricula tailored for both native and non-native speakers.
- Secondary School students at YCIS Hong Kong study IGCSE and the IB Diploma Programme.
- YCIS Hong Kong curriculum in Years 1-3 includes professional violin lessons taught by highly trained, world-class violinists, including but not limited to musicians such as Ms Bae.
- YCIS Hong Kong offers a common Pre-IB course, identical to Year 11, for new students seeking to prepare for the IB Diploma Programme.

== Timeline ==
- 1932 – Yew Chung is founded.
- 1990s – Primary and secondary schools officially open.
- 2008 – YCIS Hong Kong joins the network to raise funds for the victims of Sichuan.
- 2010 – Yew Chung's Director, Dr. Barkley Chan, receives an Honorary Degree of Doctor of Humane Letters from the University of Illinois, US.
- 2011 – YCIS launches network charity, Seeds of Hope.
- 2015 – Yew Chung's Director, Dr. Betty Chan, receives an Honorary Degree of Doctor of Laws from the University of Bath, UK.
- 2015 – YCIS Hong Kong Secondary is accredited by the Council of International Schools (CIS)

== Notable alumni ==
- Chu Ka Mong, fencer
- William Chan, singer and actor
- Jared Sean Gallagher, professional footballer

== Accreditation and authorisation ==
- Council of International Schools (CIS)
- International General Certificate of Secondary Education (IGCSE)
- International Baccalaureate Diploma Programme (IBDP)
- A member of Association of China and Mongolia International Schools (ACAMIS)

== Criticism ==
Despite the high scores that YCIS's students have received in the IB and IGCSE curriculum, students, parents and teachers from the school have expressed several criticisms on school review websites such as glassdoor.com and ischooladvisor.com. Common criticisms include:

- An over-emphasis on the Chinese language and culture, especially for an international school.
- Bullying, through the form of racism (towards both students and staff), as well as an Instagram gossip account
- Bad learning environment, due to the "Open learning classrooms" and numerous CCTV cameras.
- High tuition fees, over-commercialization in the school.
- Poor management, difficulties with reaching higher-ups.
- Teaching quality varying greatly between teachers, many teachers leaving halfway through the two-year IGCSE and IB courses.
