= Yew Chung International School of Shanghai =

- Shanghai, China

Information
- Type: Preschool, Kindergarten, Primary School, Secondary School
- Motto: "Yew Chung will Align with Science and Technology, Culture and Art, Love and Charity."
- Established: 1993
- Director: Dr. Betty Chan Po-King
- Information: enquiry@sh.ycef.com
- Website: www.ycis-sh.com

Yew Chung International School of Shanghai (YCIS Shanghai; Chinese: 上海耀中国际学校) is a private school in Shanghai, with campuses in both the Puxi and Pudong districts of the city. It is affiliated with Yew Chung International School in Hong Kong.

== Origins and History ==
Yew Chung International School of Shanghai is accredited by the Ministry of Education to enrol children of foreign passport holders.
