= List of universities and colleges in Shanghai =

This is a list of universities and colleges in Shanghai.

Name	Chinese name	Type
Fudan University	复旦大学	National (Direct)
Tongji University	同济大学	National (Direct)
Shanghai Jiao Tong University	上海交通大学	National (Direct)
East China University of Science and Technology	华东理工大学	National (Direct)
University of Shanghai for Science and Technology	上海理工大学	Municipal
Shanghai Maritime University	上海海事大学	Municipal
Donghua University	东华大学	National (Direct)
Shanghai Institute of Technology	上海应用技术学院	Municipal
Shanghai University of Medicine & Health Sciences	上海健康医学院	Municipal
Shanghai Ocean University	上海海洋大学	Municipal
Shanghai University of Traditional Chinese Medicine	上海中医药大学	Municipal
East China Normal University	华东师范大学	National (Direct)
Shanghai Normal University	上海师范大学	Municipal
Shanghai International Studies University	上海外国语大学	National (Direct)
Shanghai University of Finance and Economics	上海财经大学	National (Direct)
Shanghai University of International Business and Economics	上海对外经贸大学	Municipal
Shanghai Customs College	上海海关学院	National (other)
East China University of Political Science and Law	华东政法大学	Municipal
Shanghai University of Sport	上海体育学院	Municipal
Shanghai Conservatory of Music	上海音乐学院	Municipal
Shanghai Theatre Academy	上海戏剧学院	Municipal
Shanghai University	上海大学	Municipal
Shanghai University Law School		Municipal
Shanghai University of Engineering Science	上海工程技术大学	Municipal
Shanghai Lixin University of Accounting and Finance	上海立信会计金融学院	Municipal
Shanghai Dianji University	上海电机大学	Municipal
Sanda University	上海杉达学院	Private
Shanghai University of Political Science and Law	上海政法学院	Municipal
Shanghai Second Polytechnic University	上海第二工业大学	Municipal
Shanghai Business School	上海商学院	Municipal
Shanghai Jian Qiao University	上海建桥学院	Private
Xing Wei College	上海兴伟学院	Private
Shanghai Institute of Visual Arts	上海视觉艺术学院	Private
Xianda College of Economics and Humanities, Shanghai International Studies University	上海外国语大学贤达经济人文学院	Private
Tianhua College, Shanghai Normal University	上海师范大学天华学院	Private
ShanghaiTech University	上海科技大学	Municipal
New York University Shanghai	上海纽约大学	Sino-foreign

== Others ==
- People's Liberation Army Naval Medical University
- China Executive Leadership Academy in Pudong
- China Europe International Business School (CEIBS)
- East-Sea University
