= Songjiang University Town =

Coordinates: 31.048375°N 121.207952°E

- Simplified Chinese: 松江大学城
- Traditional Chinese: 松江大學城
Transcriptions
Standard Mandarin
- Hanyu Pinyin: Sōngjiāng Dàxuéchéng

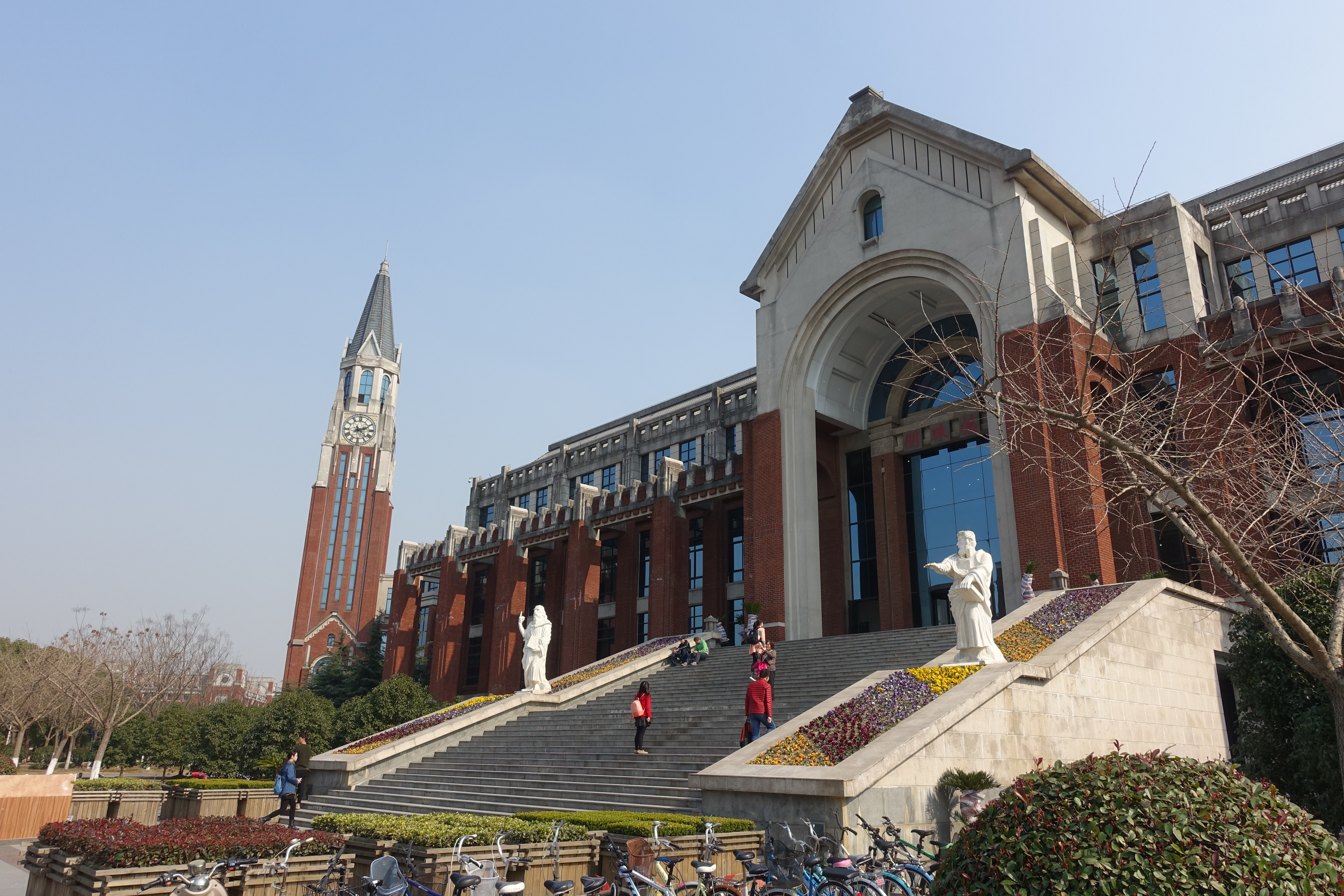
East China University of Political Science and Law Songjiang Campus

Songjiang University Town or Songjiang University City (Chinese: 松江大学城; pinyin: Sōngjiāng Dàxuéchéng) is a tertiary education hub located in the outskirts of Shanghai in Songjiang District.

The university town was established in 2000 and had its foundations built in 2005. It has an area of 8000 mu (approx. 533 hectares). The university town area is the biggest tertiary education hubs in mainland China, including 7 higher education institutions.

== Universities ==
The following universities have campuses in the university town:

- Shanghai International Studies University
- Donghua University
- Shanghai Institute of Visual Art
- East China University of Political Science and Law
- Shanghai University of International Business and Economics (formerly Shanghai Institute of Foreign Trade)
- Shanghai Lixin University of Commerce
- Shanghai University of Engineering Sciences

== Transport ==
The university town can be reached via the Shanghai Metro: Songjiang University Town station.
