= Ming-Ai (London) Institute =

Chinese institute in London, England

- 明愛(倫敦)學院
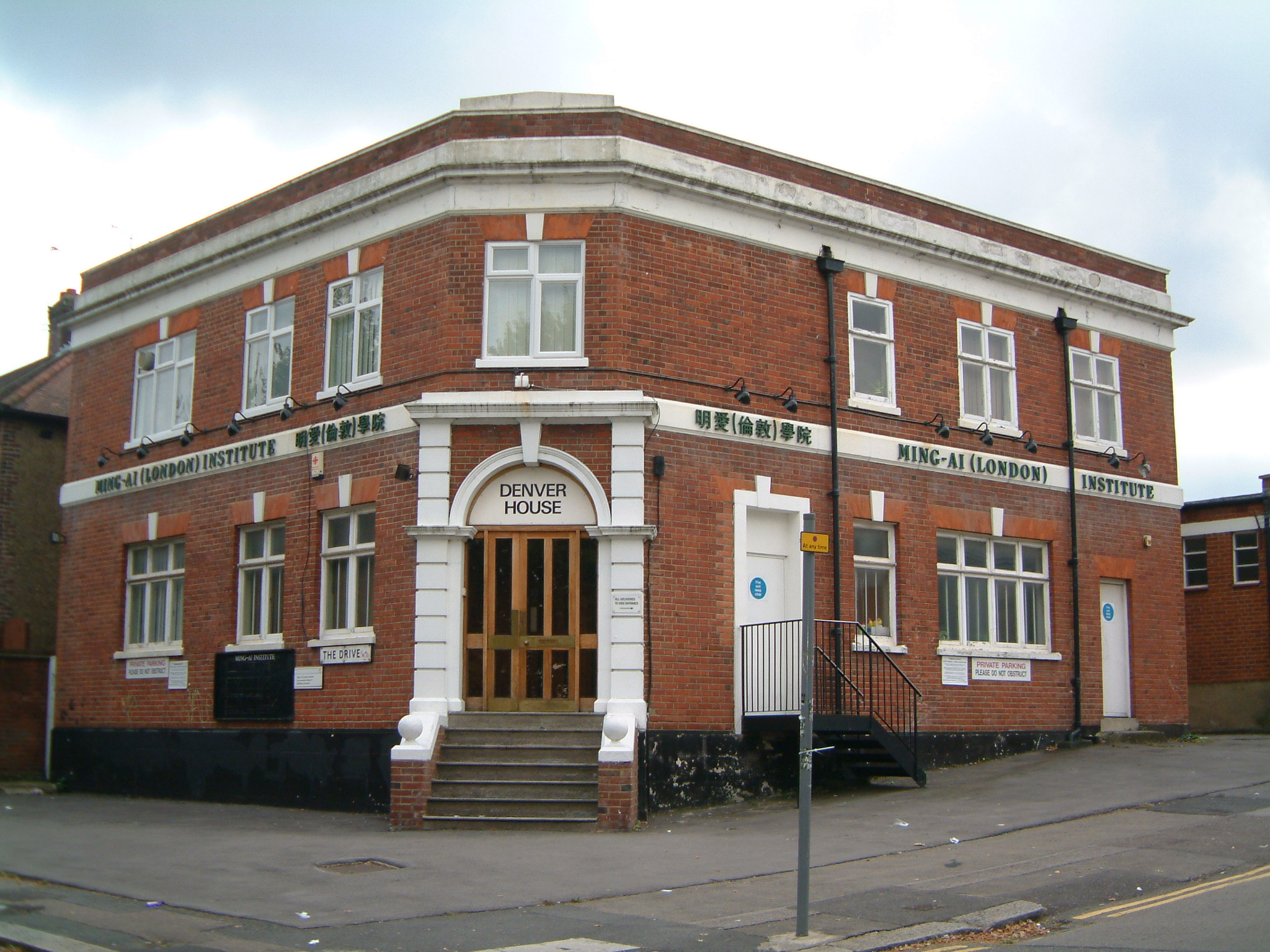
- View of Denver House

Location
- Denver House, 1 Cline Road; London, N11 2LX; 51.60992°N 0.13238°W

Information
- Motto: 愛是服務; Ài Shì Fúwù (Pinyin) (To Love is to Serve)
- Established: 1992
- Founder: Therese Wai Han Shak, PhD (1932–2010)
- Dean: Chungwen Li
- Director: Kamsang Law
- Website: ming-ai.org.uk

The Ming-Ai (London) Institute (traditional: 明愛(倫敦)學院; pinyin: Míng'ài (Lúndūn) Xuéyuàn) is the executive arm of the Ming-Ai Association, established in 1992 to promote Chinese culture locally and deliver cultural exchanges between the United Kingdom and Greater China.

Operating from Denver House near Bounds Green tube station, the Ming-Ai (London) Institute offers a number of short courses and delivers a range of undergraduate and postgraduate courses in Memorandum with Middlesex University.

The Ming-Ai (London) Institute hosts and exhibits information about British Chinese cultural Heritage through the British Chinese Heritage Centre (traditional: 英國華人文化傳承中心; pinyin: Yīngguó Huárén Wénhuà Chuánchéng Zhōngxīn), a cyber centre dedicated to ongoing and past heritage projects conducted by the Ming-Ai (London) Institute.

Ming-Ai (London) Institute
- Traditional Chinese: 明愛(倫敦)學院
- Simplified Chinese: 明爱(伦敦)学院
Transcriptions
Standard Mandarin
- Hanyu Pinyin: Míng-ài (Lúndūn) Xuéyuàn
- Wade–Giles: Ming^{2}-Ai^{4} (Lun^{2} Dun^{1}) Xue^{2} Yuan^{4}

The institute has also delivered a variety of professional and vocational courses, which include the following: languages, including Japanese, Cantonese, and Mandarin; hospitality, including Food Hygiene (CIEH), BIIAB National Certificate Personal Licence Holder (NCPLH), Cookery in Chinese and Oriental Style and Dimsum Taster Days; leisure, Tai Chi, Piano, Chinese Painting, Chinese Calligraphy; and others, including the Life in the UK British Citizenship Test.

== Therese Wai Han Shak ==
Theresa Wai Han Shak (Chinese name: 石慧嫻) is the founder of the Ming-Ai (London) Institute. Theresa's origins in mainland China, inherited wealth, connections to the Catholic Church, and passion for contemporary education allowed Shak to become highly influential in educational reform and UK-China relations. Understanding her journey and mission provides insights to the institute's origins and purpose.

== Projects ==
To fulfill the mission of the Ming-Ai (London) Institute, numerous projects have been delivered towards cultural exchange between the UK and China and promoting Chinese culture locally. Typically, projects include a number of oral histories which form the basis for a series of research publications, community events, training events, and workshops. The training of volunteers and staff is an important measure of success for each project. The institute is currently a placement partner of Goldsmiths, University of London.

=== British Chinese Armed Forces Heritage ===
Funded by the Heritage Lottery Fund, British Chinese Armed Forces (simplified: 华籍英军史; traditional: 華籍英軍史; pinyin: Huájíyīng Jūnshǐ) is an ongoing project launched in June 2015. The project is a four-year undertaking in collaboration with Regent's University London for the creation of a cultural-historical archive documenting the contributions made by people of Chinese descent to the British Armed Forces. In partnership with the National Army Museum, the institute will collect the stories about historical items. The project has been mentioned in The Huffington Post.

==== Interviews ====
Elizabeth Mary Ride

Elizabeth Ride provided the Ming-Ai (London) Institute with her account of her father, Sir Lindsay Ride's career in British Hong Kong with the British Army. The recording, which has been archived at the British Chinese Heritage Centre, also speaks of how Ride came to form the British Army Aid Group.

Brigadier Norman Allen

A Brigadier previously stationed in Hong Kong.

Brigadier Christopher Hammerbeck

Brigadier Christopher Hammerbeck a former Deputy Commander and Chief of Staff of British Forces Overseas Hong Kong.

Commodore Peter Melson

The final commodore of HMS Tamar in Hong Kong.

=== British Chinese Workforce Heritage ===
Funded by the Heritage Lottery Fund, British Chinese Work Force Heritage (英國華人職業傳承史) was a three-year project launched in 2012 with provision to explore the contributions made by British Chinese to the London workforce over the past 150 years, during which, Ming-Ai (London) Institute trained 12 interns, published 89 oral histories, and five articles in partnership with the City of London, Haringey Council, London Metropolitan Archives, Islington Heritage, National Army Museum, Regent's University London, Horniman Museum & Gardens, St Micheal's Catholic College, University College London, Middlesex University London, K&L Gates, and City of Westminster Libraries. The British Chinese Workforce Heritage project was written about in the South China Morning Post.

=== British Chinese Food Culture ===
Funded by the Heritage Lottery Fund, the British Chinese Food Culture (英國中餐文化) project was launched in 2011 in order to identify the changes in British Chinese cuisine from the original recipes derived from Greater China. A key focus is how the availability of ingredients caused Chinese restaurants to adapt their dishes and explores how the reintroduction of original ingredients allows restaurants to deliver greater authenticity.

=== Healthy Chinese Cuisine Ambassadors ===
From 2016, the new GCSE in Food Preparation & Nutrition will be taught in British schools. In preparation, the Ming-Ai (London) Institute, in partnership with Chinese manufacturer Lee Kum Kee, founded a project to promote Chinese cuisine in British schools. The project lasts for five years with the objective of reaching 280 schools and conducting 40 or more teacher training workshops.

=== East West Festive Culture ===
Funded by the Heritage Lottery Fund, East West Festive Culture (東西文化節慶) was a two-year project which started in October 2008. The project aimed to explore analogous festivals in Western and Chinese cultures. Tracing 150 years of British Chinese festive celebration in London, the project cast light on three demographics. Firstly, Chinese people who emigrated to the UK in their early life; secondly, couples with a non-Chinese partner; and finally, British-born Chinese. Each of these groups was selected to shed light to both the contrast and similarities between Eastern and Western culture.

=== The Evolution and History of British Chinese Workforce ===
In October 2009, the Ming-Ai (London) Institution used funding from the UK Government Transformation Fund to undertake The Evolution and History of British Chinese Workforce (英國華人職業演變史) project. This was the second oral histories project undertaken by the Ming-Ai (London) Institute.

=== Making Chinese Votes Count ===
Funded by the Electoral Commission, the Making Chinese Votes Count project was managed by a consortium consisting of both the Ming-Ai (London) Institute and the London Chinese Community Network (LCCN). The 12-month project started in January 2006 with provision to improve the representation of Chinese people in the UK Government. Within the project, a series of community workshops were delivered, covering topics such as electoral law, political participation, and how to become involved in politics. Around 180 people, of which, 56% were of Chinese descent, attended a series of four workshops through the course of the project.

== Associate College of Middlesex University ==
In 1995, the institution joined resources with Middlesex University to develop a number of China-related courses. The Ming-Ai (London) Institute delivers postgraduate courses in Chinese Cultural Heritage Management, leading to either MA, PG Dip, and PG Cert qualifications, which are awarded by Middlesex University.

The Ming-Ai (London) Institute also facilitated negotiations between Middlesex University and Beijing University of Chinese Medicine and Pharmacology, leading to the establishment in 1997 of their joint five-year Degree programme, B.Sc. (Hons) in Traditional Chinese Medicine, for which the Ming-Ai (London) Institute provides Mandarin training for the programme.

== Domestic activities ==
The institute has established relationships with many UK institutions and community groups with whom the Ming-Ai (London) Institute has collaborated in joint ventures toward the aim of forging closer ties Greater China, British Chinese communities, and the rest of Great Britain.

=== Network of UK Higher Education Institutions ===
Links with UK Institutions of higher education have allowed the institute to recruit, on China's behalf, UK graduates to teach overseas. Furthermore, the institute has helped UK institutions to recruit students from across Greater China by giving lecturers an opportunity to teach in Chinese institutions. In 2008, the institution had contacts across 13 Chinese provinces.

==== UK Institutions in the Ming-Ai (London) Institute's Education Network ====
1992–2002

- Berkshire College of Agriculture
- Birmingham College of Food, Tourism and Creative Studies
- Bloomsbury Education
- Broxtowe College
- Calderdale College Corporation
- Cambridge Regional College
- Derby College
- Gateshead College
- Guildford College
- Hopwood Hall College
- Leeds English Language School
- Nescot
- Northumbria University
- Notre Dame Catholic Sixth Form College

2002–2012

- Regent's University London
- University College London
- Goldsmiths, University of London

== International activities ==
The institute organizes Education Missions across Greater China in order to link UK academics to their counterparts in China. Each mission may pertain to conferences, seminars, and workshops with the intention of strengthening UK-China relations in the sphere of education. Hosts have included prestigious Chinese institutions of higher education, including Peking University, Jilin University, Wuhan University, and Sichuan University.

=== Institutions in Greater China visited by the Ming-Ai (London) Institute ===
1992–2002

- Adult Education College of Chengdu
- Anhui Administration Institute
- Anhui Economic Management Cadres Institute
- Anhui Education Commission
- Anhui Management Development Center
- Anhui Provincial People's Government
- Anhui Provincial Planning Commission
- Anhui University
- Art Gallery of Anhui Province
- Beijing 21 Century Experimental School
- Beijing Adult Education College
- Beijing Association of Adult Education
- Beijing College of Traditional Chinese Medicine
- Beijing Higher Education Development Center for Science and Technology
- Beijing Industry University
- Beijing Institute of Tourism
- Beijing ISS International School International Education Center
- Beijing Jingshan School
- Beijing Language and Culture University
- Beijing No.2 Experimental Primary School
- Beijing Normal University No.2 Middle School
- Beijing Normal University: The First Middle School
- Beijing Union University
- Beijing University
- Beijing University of Traditional Chinese Medicine
- Caritas Chan Chun Ha Field Studies Centre
- Caritas Institute of Higher Education
- Central Institute of Finance and Banking
- Changchun University
- Chengdu Adult Education College
- Chengdu Chinese Medicine University
- Chengdu College of Education
- Chengdu Education Commission
- Chengdu University
- China Textile University
- Chinese Academy of Agricultural Sciences
- Chinese Academy of Science
- Chinese Educational Association for International Exchange
- Chongqing University
- Chongqing University of Medical Science
- Dalian Zhongshan District Peizhi School
- Central Institute of Finance and Accounting, Department of Accounting
- Department of Foreign Affairs State Administration of Traditional Chinese Medicine
- Development Centre for Teaching Chinese as a Foreign Language Under the Ministry of Education
- Development Centre for Teaching Chinese as a Foreign Language Under the State Education Commission
- Education Commission of Gansu Province
- Education Commission of Guangxi Zhuang Autonomous Region
- Education Department of Hainan Province
- Employees Retraining Board
- Foreign Affairs and Friendship Commission of Guangxi, CPPCC
- Foshan Education Committee
- Foshan University
- Fudan University
- Guangdong Administration College
- Guangdong Association of Public Administration
- Guangdong Commercial College
- Guangdong Higher Education Bureau
- Guangxi Agriculture University
- Guangxi Committee, CPPCC
- Guangxi Education Association for International Exchanges
- Guangxi Educational Newspaper
- Guangxi Infantile Paralysis Orthopedic Centre
- Guangxi Radio and TV University
- Guangxi Teachers University
- Guangxi University
- Guangxi University for Nationalities
- Guangxi Zhuang Autonomous Region's Committee of the Chinese People's Political Consultative Conference
- Guangzhou Adult Education Association
- Guangzhou Education College
- Guangzhou Education Committee
- Guangzhou Educational and International Exchange Association
- Guangzhou Huamei International School
- Guangzhou Medical College
- Guangzhou People's Municipal Government
- Guangzhou Radio and Television University
- Guangzhou Teacher's College
- Guangzhou Television and Broadcasting University
- Guangzhou University
- Guangzhou University of Chinese Medicine
- Guangzhou Vocational University
- Guilin Committee of the Chinese People's Political Consultative Conference
- Guilin CPPCC Liaison Committee
- Guilin Institute of Technology
- Guilin Social Welfare Centre
- Guizhou Institute of Technology
- Guizhou Social Welfare Centre
- Guizhou Daily
- Guizhou Education College
- Guizhou Education Commission
- Guizhou Province Tourist Department
- Guizhou Provincial Education Commission
- Guizhou Provincial Municipal Government
- Guizhou Radio and Television University
- Haikou Tourists Vocational School
- Hainan Province Education and Science Research Institute
- Hainan University
- Hainan University Library
- Harbin Normal University
- Hefei Normal University
- Hefei Union University
- Hefei University of Technology
- Heilongjiang Bureau of Foreign Experts
- Heilongjiang College of Commercial
- Heilongjiang Education Commission
- Heilongjiang Medical Academy
- Heilongjiang University
- Higher Education Bureau of Guangdong Province
- Hong Kong & Macao Office State Council People's Republic of China
- Huazhong University of Science and Technology
- Hubei College of Traditional Chinese Medicine
- Hubei Province Economic & Management Director University
- Hubei Provincial Education Commission
- Hubei University
- Internal Trade Ministry of China
- International Council of Adult Education
- Jianghan Petroleum Institute
- Jiangsu Association of Education and International Exchange
- Jiangsu Education Commission
- Jiangsu Hospital of Traditional Chinese Medicine
- Jilin Clinic Medical Health Office
- Jilin Clinic Medical Health Office
- Jilin Hospital of Traditional Chinese Medicine
- Jilin Institute of Technology
- Jilin Province Communication School
- Jilin Provincial Education Commission
- Jilin University
- Jilin University of Technology
- Jinling Vocational University
- Nanhai Education Department
- Nanjing Changjiang Lu Elementary School
- Nanjing College of Traditional Chinese Medicine
- Nanjing International Acupuncture Training Centre
- Nanjing Normal University
- Nanjing University of Traditional Chinese Medicine
- National Office for Teaching Chinese as a Foreign Language
- Office State Commission of Chinese Proficiency Test
- Overseas Tidings Magazine
- People's Congress of Guangzhou
- PPCC of Shanxi Province
- Shanghai Adult Education Committee
- Shanghai Bureau of Higher Education
- Shanghai Da Tong High School
- Shanghai Education Association for International Exchange
- Shanghai Exchange
- Shanghai Fermented Foods Company
- Shanghai Institute of Foreign Trade
- Shanghai Institute of Tourism
- Shanghai Municipal People's Government Education Commission
- Shanghai Second Polytechnic University
- Shanghai Teachers University
- Shanghai Textile College
- Shanghai University
- Shanghai University of Finance and Economics
- Shanghai University of Traditional Chinese Medicine
- Shanghai Xuhui District Overseas Association
- Shanghai Hua Guang Brewery Shanghai
- Shantou University
- Shanxi Education Commission
- Shanxi University
- Shenzhen Cable Broadcasting & CATV
- Shenzhen University
- Sichuan Province Education Commission
- Sichuan Union University
- South China University of Technology
- Southeast University
- Southwestern University of Finance and Economics
- State Administration of Traditional Chinese Medicine People's Republic of China
- State Education Commission
- Suzhou No.6 Middle School
- Taiyuan University of Technology
- Tongji University
- University of Electronic Science and Technology China
- University of International Business and Economics
- Wuhan Car Industry University
- Wuhan Education Committee
- Wuhan Institute of Technology
- Wuhan Loja College of Foreign Language
- Wuhan University
- Zhong Hui CPAs
- Zhongnan University of Finance and Economics
