= Shanghai Institute of Visual Arts =

University in Shanghai, China

Coordinates: 31.048°N 121.202°E

- 上海视觉艺术学院
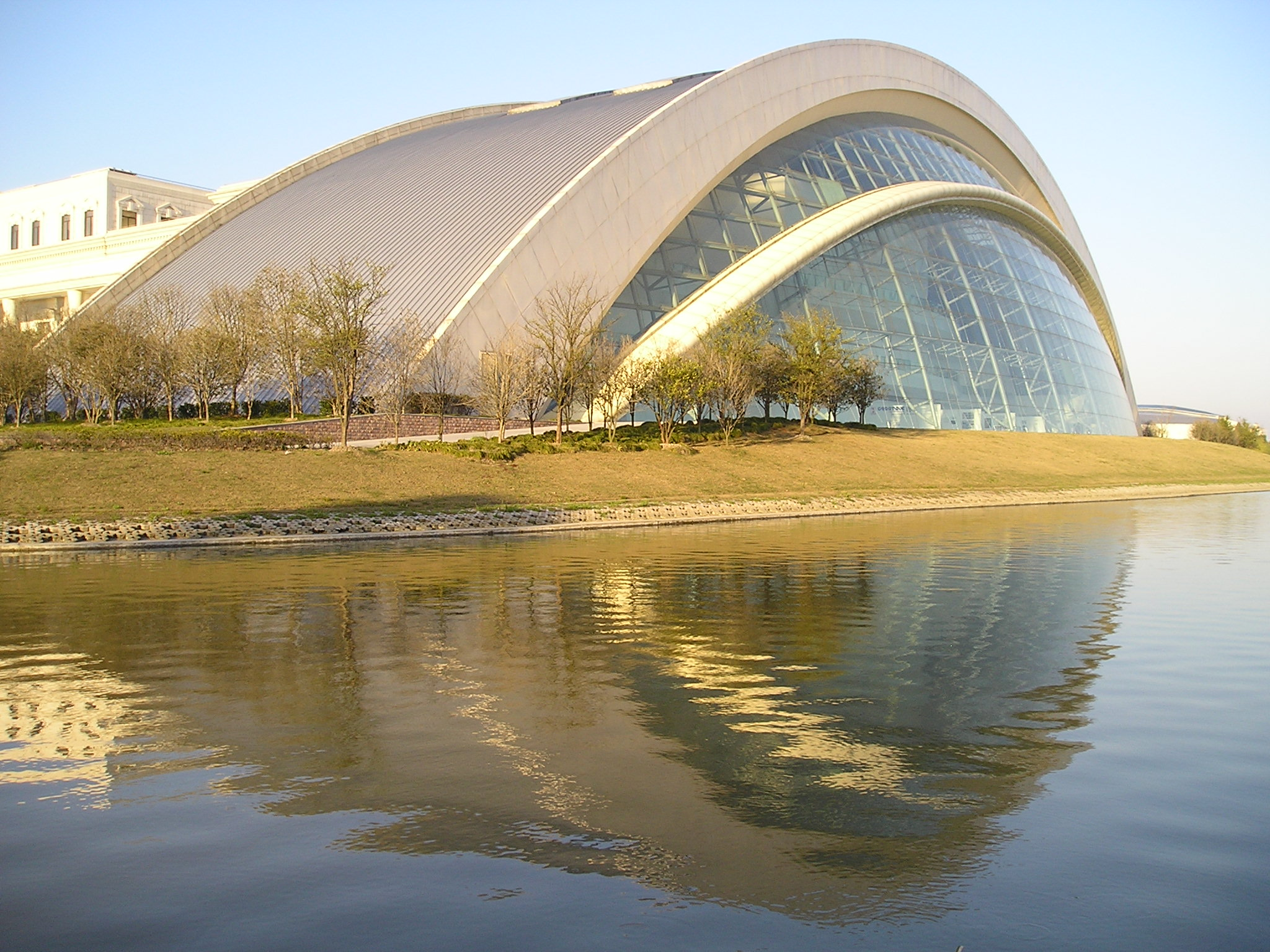
- Type: Public
- Established: 2005
- President: Gong Xueping
- Faculty: 300 full-time teachers
- Students: 3,800
- Location: Shanghai, China
- Campus: Songjiang University Town
- Website: siva.edu.cn

Shanghai Institute of Visual Arts
- Simplified Chinese: 上海视觉艺术学院
- Traditional Chinese: 上海視覺藝術學院
Transcriptions
Standard Mandarin
- Hanyu Pinyin: Shànghǎi Shìjué Yìshù Xuéyuàn

Shanghai Institute of Visual Arts (SIVA) (上海视觉艺术学院) is a public university in Songjiang District of Shanghai, China.

SIVA was established in September 2005 with the approval of the Ministry of Education. The school was founded as an art and design school with the efforts by Fudan University, Shanghai Media & Entertainment Group, Wenhui-Xinmin United Press Group, Shanghai Jingwen Investment Ltd., Shanghai Jingwen Properties Group, Shanghai Shenjiao Investment Co., Shanghai World Expo Group, Shanghai Cred Real Estate Stock Co., Emperor Entertainment Group Ltd, The 9 Ltd and Shanda Internet Development. The school had been loosely affiliated with Fudan University; in 2013, the school became a completely independent institute, and is no longer affiliated with Fudan University.

== Location ==
Songjiang University Town, SIVA covers an area of nearly 67 hectares (170 acres) with a total floor area of 120,000 square meters in Shanghai. The campus consists of academic buildings, information center, practice center, stadium and student cafeteria in place. It is adjacent to the six universities: Shanghai International Studies University; Donghua University; Shanghai Institute of Foreign Trade; Shanghai University of Engineering Sciences; Shanghai Lixin University of Commerce and East China University of Politics and Law. SIVA shares teaching and living resources with Songjiang University Town for faculty and students.

== Funding ==
State-owned funds account for over 90% of the total investment SIVA has received; the rest comes from social groups.

== Academics ==
SIVA provides a teaching model focused upon professor studios and offers a complete credit system.

The faculty is made up of full-time teachers, visiting professors and part-time teachers as well as honorary professors from home and abroad. SIVA has a developing international platform for working together with international experts on advanced art education.

Guest lecturers and professors include actor Jackie Chan, fresco artist Rainer Maria Latzke, Beowulf and Spider-Man movie animator Sing-Chong Foo, Japanese manga artist Makoto Ogino, the creator of the "Peacock King", and painters Carlos Morell Orlandis and Piers Maxwell Dudley-Bateman.

=== Advisory board ===
The advisory board members include heads of schools of art, such as the Antwerp Royal Academy of Fine Arts, Planetary Collegium, Central Saint Martins College of Art and Design (Britain), Rhode Island School of Design (the United States), National College of Art (France), The Danish School of Art and Design, the Victorian College of the Arts, the University of Melbourne (Australia), German University of the Arts, Helsinki Institute of Art and Design (Finland), the Hong Kong Academy for Performing Arts, the Hong Kong Polytechnic University, Musashino College of Art and Design (Japan).

=== Faculty staff ===
300 full-time teachers

=== Students ===
Registered full-time students in the institute approximately number 3,600.

== Organization ==
SIVA includes six subordinate colleges:

- Communication Design
- Spatial and Industrial Design
- Fashion Design
- Fine Art
- Digital Media
- Media and Films
