= University of Shanghai =

University of Shanghai may refer to:

- Hujiang University (沪江大学; 滬江大學), a private Baptist university from 1906 to 1952 in Shanghai, China
- Shanghai University (上海大学), a municipal public university established in 1994 in Shanghai, China

== See also ==
- List of universities and colleges in Shanghai
