= Halmurat Upur =

Uyghur Medicinal doctor

Halmurat Upur (or Halmurat Ghopur or Halmurat Wupur, Uyghur: خالمۇرات غوپۇر; Chinese: 哈木拉提 · 吾甫尔; born March 1960) is a Uyghur medical doctor whose degree was conferred by the Pavlov First State Medical University of St. Petersburg. He was the first scientist from Xinjiang to be awarded the Distinguished Young Scholar Fund from the National Science Fund of China in 2005.

== Early life ==
He was born in Ürümqi in 1960 and went to Shanghai University of Traditional Chinese Medicine to study Chinese medicine, then in 1988 he went to Russia to study medicine at the Pavlov First State Medical University of St. Petersburg and completed his MD degree on Immunology and Respiratory Medicine. During this period he also worked at the Xinjiang Chinese Medicine Hospital, Uyghur Medicine Hospital, and Xinjiang Medical university-affiliated hospital. His research work was focused on respiratory diseases, especially asthma, and completed more than 26 projects, wrote nine books, and published more than 150 articles in peer-review journals.

== Career ==
Halmurat Upur was the vice president of the Xinjiang Medical University from 1998 to 2008 and then president between 2008 and 2017, after which he became director of Xinjiang Food and Drug Administration until his forced disappearance in late 2017. He played a significant role in developing and promoting Xinjiang Medical University in China as well as around the globe, especially in neighboring Central and South Asian countries.

He contributed to the development and application of Uyghur medicine, as he helped open the Uyghur Medicine department and lead the role of research and training young doctors and scientists. He helped establish two pharmaceutical companies in Ürümqi, Xinjiang. He was secretly sentenced to death after disappearing for some time. It is believed that he, along with other hundreds of Uyghur and Kazakh intellectuals, were caught up in the persecution of Uyghurs in China.

His research also resulted in multiple patents and consequently multiple pharmaceutical formulations that Xinjiang Qikang Habo Weiyao Company Limited and Xinjiang Uyghur Pharmaceutical Co., Ltd. have been producing and profiting.

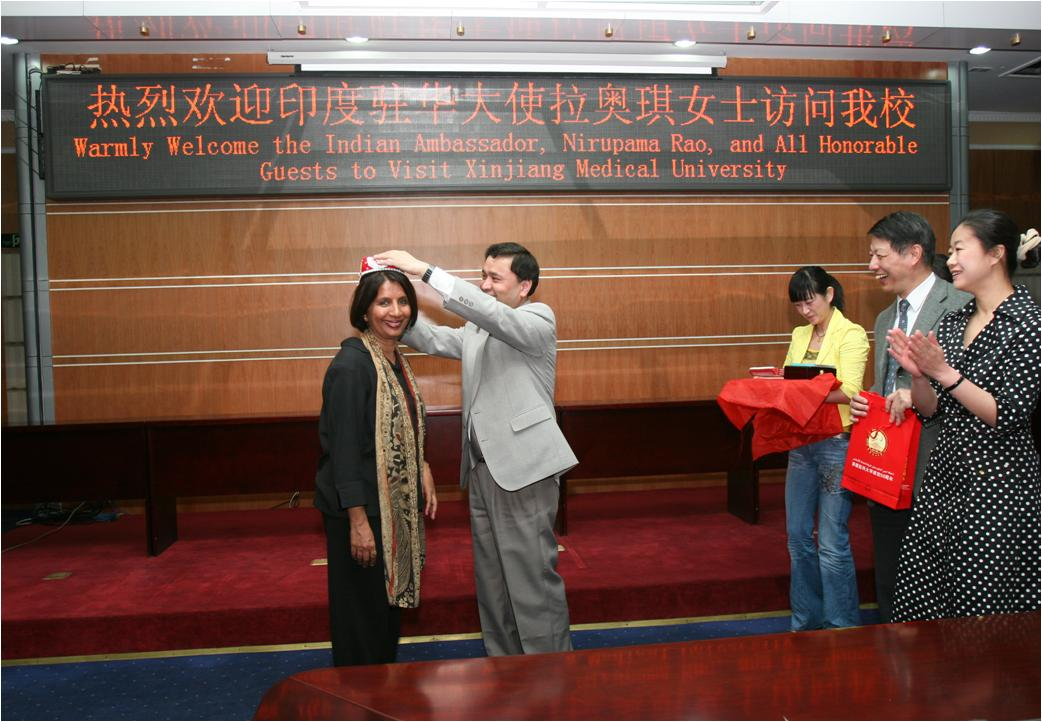
Indian Ambassador Nirupama Rao with University President Halmurat Upur

Since he became president of the Xinjiang Medical University in 2008, he accepted multiple international guests and also traveled overseas to promote the university and also to build collaborations. He promoted the university, appearing on news and state sponsored China Central Television (CCTV) which praised his activity and contribution and as well as his loyalty to the Chinese Communist Party.

In late 2017, he disappeared from public life. In early 2018, it was reported that he was secretly sentenced to death for 'separatism' with two year suspension.
