= List of Kappa Beta Pi chapters =

Kappa Beta Phi is an American secret society. In the following list of chapters, active chapters are indicated in bold and inactive chapters are in italics.

Chapter	Charter date and range	Institution	Location	Status	Ref.
Alpha	1908	Chicago-Kent College of Law	Chicago, Illinois	Inactive	
Beta	1915	Northwestern University Law School	Evanston, Illinois	Inactive	
Gamma	1916	DePaul University College of Law	Chicago, Illinois	Inactive	
Delta	1916	University of Chicago Law School	Chicago, Illinois	Inactive	
Epsilon	1916	American University Washington College of Law	Washington, D.C.	Inactive	
Zeta	1916	John Marshall Law School	Chicago, Illinois	Inactive	
Eta	December 30, 1916 – early 1970s	University of Texas School of Law	Austin, Texas	Inactive	
Theta	1917	University of Missouri–Kansas City School of Law	Kansas City, Missouri	Inactive	
Iota	1917–1945, 1946	University of California, Berkeley School of Law	Berkeley, California	Inactive	
Kappa	1920–1929	Yale Law School	New Haven, Connecticut	Inactive	
Lambda	1920	University of Detroit Mercy School of Law	Detroit, Michigan	Inactive	
Mu	1920–1939, 1959	Detroit College of Law	East Lansing, Michigan	Inactive	
Nu	1920	George Washington University Law School	Washington, D.C.	Inactive	
Xi	1920	University of Michigan Law School	Ann Arbor, Michigan	Inactive	
Omicron	1921–1954	National University School of Law	Washington, D.C.	Inactive	(Note: Chapter closed when the law school merged with George Washington.)
Pi	1921	Washington University School of Law	St. Louis, Missouri	Inactive	
Rho	1921	University of Iowa College of Law	Iowa City, Iowa	Inactive	
Sigma	1921–1939	Cornell Law School	Ithaca, New York	Inactive	
Tau	1921	Boston University School of Law	Boston, Massachusetts	Inactive	
Upsilon	1921	Syracuse University College of Law	Syracuse, New York	Inactive	
Phi	1921	University of Illinois College of Law	Champaign, Illinois	Inactive	
Chi	1921	University of Oregon School of Law	Eugene, Oregon	Inactive	
Psi	1921	University of Wisconsin Law School	Madison, Wisconsin	Inactive	
Omega	1923–1949	University of Southern California Law	Los Angeles, California	Inactive	
Alpha Alpha	1923–c. 1944	John Marshall School of Law	Cleveland, Ohio	Inactive	(Note: College merged to become the Cleveland-Marshall Law School in 1944.)
Alpha Beta	1923–1958	University of Minnesota Law School	Minneapolis, Minnesota	Inactive	
Alpha Gamma	1924	Southwestern University Law School	Los Angeles, California	Inactive	
Alpha Delta	1924	University at Buffalo Law School	Buffalo, New York	Inactive	
Alpha Epsilon	1924–1935	Chicago Law School	Chicago, Illinois	Inactive	(Note: Chapter closed when the law school closed.)
Alpha Zeta	1924	Marquette University Law School	Milwaukee, Wisconsin	Inactive	
Alpha Eta	1924–1957	University of California, Hastings College of the Law	San Francisco, California	Inactive	
Alpha Theta	1924	Loyola University Chicago School of Law	Chicago, Illinois	Inactive	
Alpha Iota	1925	Saint Louis University School of Law	St. Louis, Missouri	Inactive	
Alpha Kappa	1925	Creighton University School of Law	Omaha, Nebraska	Inactive	
Alpha Lambda	1925–1942, 1951	University of Nebraska College of Law	Lincoln, Nebraska	Inactive	(Note: Looks like a typo in Baird's, which showed it installed in 1945. Assume this is 1925, to match alphabetical order.)
Alpha Mu	1925	Osgoode Hall Law School	Toronto, Canada	Inactive	
Alpha Nu	1926	Ohio State University	Columbus, Ohio	Inactive	
Alpha Xi	1926	University of Oklahoma College of Law	Norman, Oklahoma	Inactive	
Alpha Omicron	1927	University of Paris	Paris, France	Inactive	
Alpha Pi	1930	Tulane University Law School	New Orleans, Louisiana	Inactive	
Alpha Rho	1931	University of Alabama School of Law	Tuscaloosa, Alabama	Inactive	
Alpha Sigma	1931	University of Denver Law School	Denver, Colorado	Inactive	
Alpha Tau	1931	University of North Dakota School of Law	Grand Forks, North Dakota	Inactive	
Alpha Upsilon	1932	West Virginia University College of Law	Morgantown, West Virginia	Inactive	
Alpha Phi	1932	University of Arizona Law School	Tucson, Arizona	Inactive	
Alpha Chi	1934–1938, 1957	Columbia Law School	New York City, New York	Inactive	
Alpha Psi	1940	Southern Methodist University	Dallas, Texas	Inactive	
Alpha Omega	1940	Drake University Law School	Des Moines, Iowa	Inactive	
Beta Alpha	1940		London, England	Inactive	
Beta Beta	1946–1950, 1951	University of Missouri School of Law	Columbia, Missouri	Inactive	
Beta Gamma	1946	Columbus School of Law	Washington, D.C.	Inactive	
Beta Delta	1946	University of San Francisco School of Law	San Francisco, California	Inactive	
Beta Epsilon				Unassigned ?	
Beta Zeta	1947	Shanghai University Law School	Shanghai, China	Inactive	
Beta Eta	1948	University of South Dakota School of Law	Vermillion, South Dakota	Inactive	
Beta Theta	1949	University of Miami School of Law	Coral Gables, Florida	Inactive	
Beta Iota	1949–1952, 1953	Emory University School of Law	Atlanta, Georgia	Inactive	
Beta Kappa	1950	University of Virginia School of Law	Charlottesville, Virginia	Inactive	
Beta Lambda	1952	St. Mary's University School of Law	San Antonio, Texas	Inactive	
Beta Mu	1953	Georgetown University Law Center	Washington, D.C.	Inactive	
Beta Nu	1954		West Germany	Inactive	
Beta Xi	1955	University of Houston Law Center	Houston, Texas	Inactive	
Beta Omicron	1956	University of Toledo College of Law	Toledo, Ohio	Inactive	
Beta Pi	1958	Boston University School of Law	Boston, Massachusetts	Inactive	
Beta Rho	1960–196x ?	University of Kentucky College of Law	Lexington, Kentucky	Inactive	(Note: Baird's list shows two "Kentucky" chapters, in Beta Rho and Beta Chi.)
Beta Sigma	1962	Seton Hall University School of Law	Newark, New Jersey	Inactive	
Beta Tau	1962–1970	Rutgers Law School	Newark, New Jersey	Inactive	
Beta Upsilon	1963–1974	Howard University School of Law	Washington, D.C.	Inactive	
Beta Phi	1963–1979	Fordham University School of Law	New York City, New York	Inactive	
Beta Chi	1963–1971	University of Kentucky College of Law	Lexington, Kentucky	Inactive	
Beta Psi	1964–1973	University of Puerto Rico School of Law	Rio Piedras, Puerto Rico	Inactive	
Beta Omega	1966	Ohio Northern University College of Law	Ada, Ohio	Inactive	
Gamma Alpha	1966–1972	University of Colorado Law School	Boulder, Colorado	Inactive	
Gamma Beta	1967–1973	Franklin University	Columbus, Ohio	Inactive	
Gamma Gamma	1967	University of Arkansas School of Law	Fayetteville, Arkansas	Inactive	
Gamma Delta	1967	University of Arkansas at Little Rock School of Law	Little Rock, Arkansas	Inactive	
Gamma Epsilon	1968–1973	University of New Brunswick Faculty of Law	Fredericton, New Brunswick, Canada	Inactive	
Gamma Zeta	1970	University of Mississippi School of Law	University, Mississippi	Inactive	
Gamma Eta	1971	Texas Tech University School of Law	Lubbock, Texas	Inactive	
Gamma Theta	1972–1973	University of Pittsburgh School of Law	Pittsburgh, Pennsylvania	Inactive	
Gamma Iota	1972–1973	Duquesne University Law School	Pittsburgh, Pennsylvania	Inactive	
Gamma Kappa	1973	University of Windsor Faculty of Law	Windsor, Ontario, Canada	Inactive	
Gamma Lambda	1974	University of Ottawa Faculty of Law	Ottawa, Ontario, Canada	Inactive	
