= Mark Beer =

British lawyer and businessman

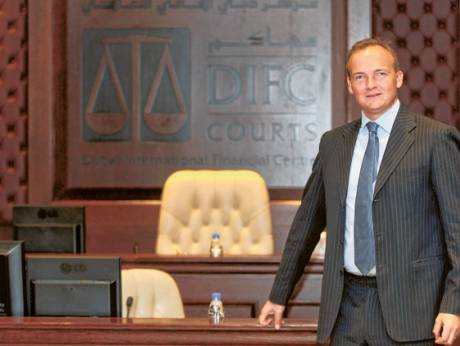
- Beer in the DIFC Courtroom
- Born: November 1971

Mark Gregory Beer OBE (born November 1971) is a British lawyer, court executive and businessman. He served as Registrar, Chief Executive and later Registrar General of the Dubai International Financial Centre (DIFC) Courts between 2008 and 2018. He also served as Registrar of the Dubai World Tribunal from 2009 to 2018 and was the first Chief Executive of the DIFC Dispute Resolution Authority.

Beer has held leadership roles in international court administration and legal innovation, including serving as President of the International Association for Court Administration (IACA). In 2013 he was appointed an Officer of the Order of the British Empire (OBE) for services to British and Emirati business cooperation and enhancing legal cooperation in Dubai.

== Early life and education ==
Beer was born in November 1971. He was educated at King Edward's School, Birmingham, and Manchester Grammar School. He graduated from the University of Oxford in 1993 with a degree in jurisprudence.

== Career ==
=== Early career ===
Beer began his legal career in the United Kingdom as a commercial lawyer. In 1997 he relocated to Dubai with the international law firm Clyde & Co. He later held a regional legal position with Mastercard before entering judicial administration.

Following his graduation from the University of Oxford and completion of professional legal training, Beer worked in commercial legal practice in the United Kingdom and the United Arab Emirates before moving into in‑house roles in the financial services and payments industries. He held regional legal and management positions with international firms and companies in Europe, the Middle East and Africa before his appointment as Registrar of the Dubai International Financial Centre (DIFC) Courts in 2008.

=== DIFC Courts ===
In 2008 Beer was appointed Registrar of the Dubai International Financial Centre (DIFC) Courts, an independent common-law court system established within the Dubai International Financial Centre. His responsibilities included the administration and management of the court system. He subsequently served as Chief Executive and as a judge of the Small Claims Tribunal.

During his tenure, the jurisdiction of the DIFC Courts was expanded through Dubai Law No. 16 of 2011, allowing parties outside the DIFC to submit civil and commercial disputes to the court by agreement. The reform broadened the court's role beyond disputes arising solely within the financial centre.

Under Beer's administration the volume and value of litigation before the DIFC Courts increased substantially. In 2014 the total value of claims and counterclaims filed exceeded AED 1 billion for the first time, representing an increase from previous years.

In 2017 Beer was appointed Registrar General of the DIFC Courts. He was succeeded as Registrar by Amna Sultan Al Owais.

=== Dubai World Tribunal ===
In November 2009, the Government of Dubai established the Dubai World Tribunal following Dubai World's announcement that it would seek a standstill on approximately US$25 billion of liabilities. The tribunal was established to hear disputes arising from the restructuring of Dubai World and its subsidiaries.

Beer was appointed Registrar of the tribunal at its establishment and served until 2018. The tribunal dealt with claims involving Dubai World entities, including Nakheel, as part of the wider restructuring process.

=== DIFC Dispute Resolution Authority ===
In 2014 Beer became the first Chief Executive of the DIFC Dispute Resolution Authority (DRA), established under Dubai Law No. 7 of 2014.

The authority brought together a number of dispute-resolution institutions operating within the DIFC, including the DIFC Courts, the DIFC-LCIA Arbitration Centre, the DIFC Wills and Probate Registry, and the DIFC Academy of Law under a unified administrative framework.

=== Seven Pillars Law and The Metis Institute ===
In 2018, Beer co-founded Seven Pillars Law, a law firm established in the Astana International Financial Centre in Kazakhstan. He subsequently became chairman of the firm. It was one of the first law firms licensed in the AIFC and one of the first to register a company in space.

Since 2018, Beer has served as chairman of The Metis Institute, an organisation concerned with legal systems, governance and dispute resolution. He has also co-founded the Deep Technology Dispute Resolution Lab at the University of Oxford and has served as a visiting fellow at Oxford.

=== Legal technology ===
Beer was appointed chairman of the Astana International Financial Centre (AIFC) LawTech Advisory Council in 2020. Since 2022, he has also been a member of the AIFC Legal Services Board.

In 2021, Beer was appointed a visiting professor of AI and Law at the Shanghai University of Political Science and Law. He has also been identified by the university and other institutional sources as a Shanghe Scholar.

Beer was appointed to the Shanghai International Economic and Trade Arbitration Commission (SHIAC) panel of arbitrators.

== Education and governance ==
Beer is a visiting fellow of the University of Oxford and has served as a visiting professor at Shanghai University of Political Science and Law. He has served as a governor of Dubai English Speaking School and Dubai College.

He has held governance positions in educational institutions in the United Arab Emirates and the United Kingdom. He served as a governor of Dubai English Speaking College and has served as vice-chair of Abingdon School in Oxfordshire.

Beer has also served on the governing boards of schools in the UAE and worked with education authorities in Dubai. He has also been involved with the Centre for Riyadh Special Economic Zones, established by the Royal Commission for Riyadh City to oversee special economic zones and strengthen Riyadh’s competitiveness as a business and investment hub.

Beer was appointed by Dubai’s Crown Prince to the Dubai Future Fellowship, a programme established by the Dubai Future Foundation that brings together specialists from different fields. In 2017, Beer was appointed to the Circle of Greater Good Committee of the Knowledge and Human Development Authority (KHDA), Dubai’s government authority responsible for education and human development. Beer is chair of the Board of Trustees of the Global Legal Action Network (GLAN).

== Other activities ==
Beer was president of the International Association for Court Administration and is a member of the World Economic Forum's Expert Network for the justice sector. He has served on the International Council of the Supreme Court of the Republic of Kazakhstan and on UK government legal-technology initiatives. He has written and spoken on legal technology, dispute resolution, judicial reform and legal issues relating to China's Belt and Road Initiative.

== Honours and awards ==
In the 2013 Birthday Honours, Beer was appointed an Officer of the Order of the British Empire (OBE) for services to British and Emirati business cooperation and legal cooperation in Dubai.

In 2018, he received the Association of Corporate Counsel Middle East Achievement Award for his work in developing Dubai's judicial system.

Beer has been included in Forbes Middle East’s list of the 50 Most Influential Expats in the UAE and was named twice among the 50 Most Influential Brits in the UAE by Gulf Business.

Beer was shortlisted twice by the Law Society of England and Wales for Solicitor of the Year – In-House and was nominated for Legal Personality of the Year in the 2020 Law Society Excellence Awards.

He has also been included in recognition lists published by Forbes Middle East and Arabian Business, including Forbes Middle East's list of the top 50 most influential expatriates in the UAE and Arabian Business's list of the top 50 most influential British people in the UAE.
