= Shanghai Lixin University of Accounting and Finance =

Municipal public college in Shanghai, China

- 上海立信会计金融学院
- Former names: Shanghai Banking School; Shanghai Finance University
- Type: Municipal public college
- Established: 1928; 98 years ago
- Location: Pudong, Shanghai, China
- Campus: 45 hectares
- Nickname: SLUAF
- Website: lixin.edu.cn

Shanghai Lixin University of Accounting and Finance
- Simplified Chinese: 上海立信会计金融学院
- Traditional Chinese: 上海立信會計金融學院
Transcriptions
Standard Mandarin
- Hanyu Pinyin: Shànghǎi Lìxìn Kuàijì Jīnróng Xuéyuàn

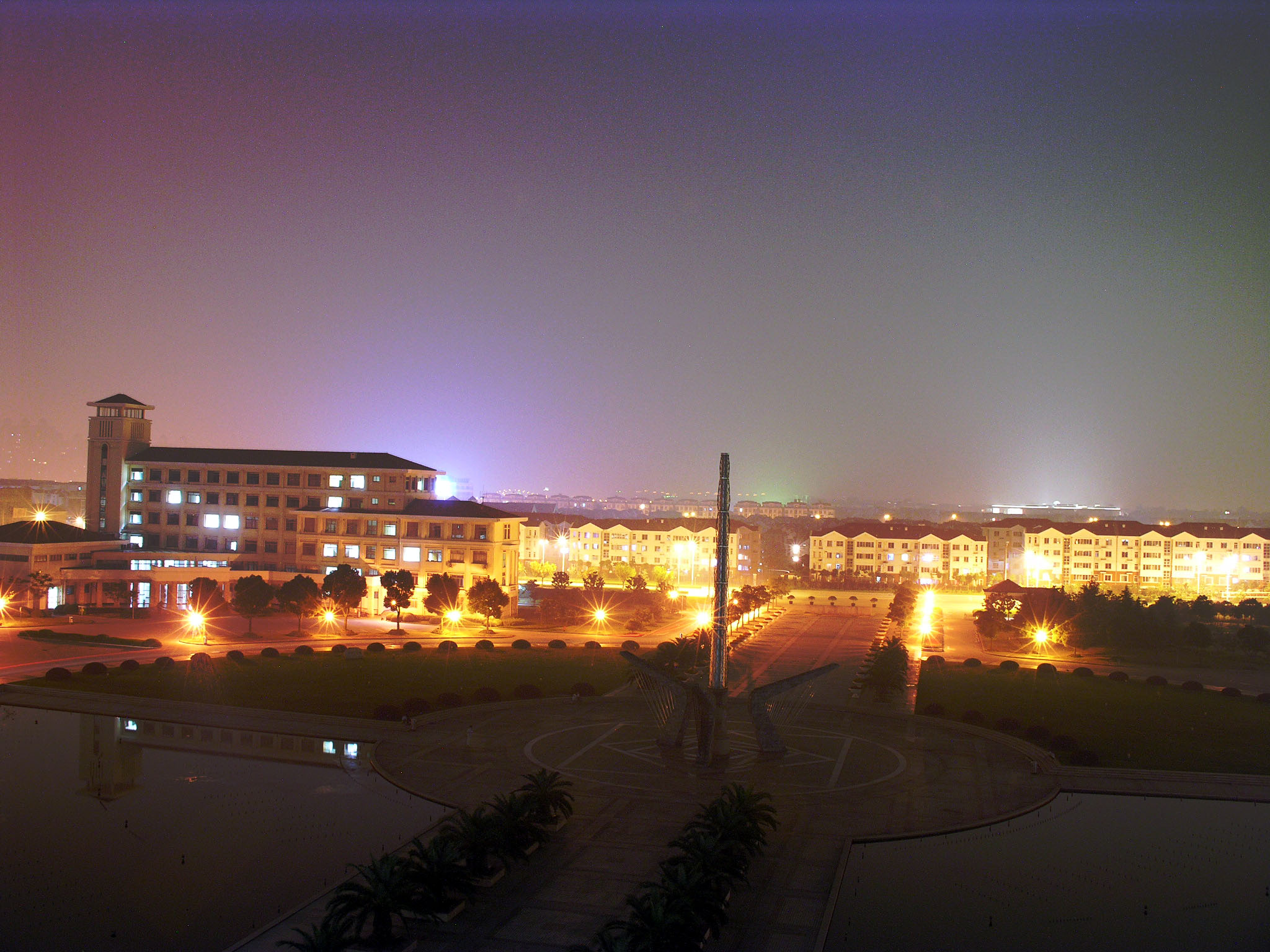
Night view of Lixin's campus

The Shanghai Lixin University of Accounting and Finance (上海立信会计金融学院; lit. 'Shanghai Lixin Accounting and Finance College') is a municipal public college in Shanghai, China. It is affiliated with the City of Shanghai and funded by the Shanghai Municipal Government.

In 2016, Shanghai Lixin Accounting College (上海立信会计学院) and Shanghai Finance College (上海金融学院) merged to form the current form of the institute. Despite its English name, the institution has not yet been granted university status,

== Campus ==
Its main campus was located on West Zhongshan Rd in Shanghai. In 2003 the campus was moved to the Songjiang District in the southwest of Songjiang University Town next to Shanghai International Studies University; Donghua University; Shanghai Institute of Foreign Trade; Shanghai University of Engineering Sciences; Shanghai Institute of Visual Art and East China University of Politics and Law.

== Shanghai Finance College ==
Shanghai Finance University
- 上海金融学院
- Former name: Shanghai Banking School
- Motto: 立诚明德 经世致用
- Motto in English: Display honesty and cultivate virtue, foster ambition and contribute to society
- Type: Public
- Established: 1952
- President: Wang Hongwei
- Academic staff: 717
- Students: 8000
- Location: Pudong, Shanghai, China
- Campus: 45 hectares
- Nickname: SFU
- Website: www.lixin.edu.cn

Shanghai Finance College, formerly known as Shanghai Banking School, was launched in 2003 through the joint efforts of the Shanghai Municipal Government and the People's Bank of China.

In Pudong New Area, SFU is near many multinational corporations and several universities. It sits on a campus with an area of more than 45 hectares and a construction area of 25 hectares.

SFU has 11 schools and six departments, offering 25 majors. The students are from 23 provinces and municipalities of mainland China, Hong Kong, Macao and Taiwan. SFU enrolls 600 foreign students. The university has more than 8000 full-time students and a faculty of 717. 227 teachers hold senior professional titles and three are entitled to 'State Special Allowance' by the China State Council.

=== History ===
China's financial industry has experienced highs and lows along with all of China's history. Financial education has played a key role. At the beginning of the republic, there was an urgent need for large numbers of financial professionals due to the establishment of branches of the People's Bank of China and the creation of a new financial system. To meet the needs of economic development, the People's Bank of China started financial education. In 1952, Shanghai Banking School was established; today it is known as Shanghai Finance College.

==== Establishment ====
Based on the requirements of business development, the People's Bank of China set up a formal banking school to cultivate banking cadres and technical talented people. In 1952, East China of People's Bank of China, People's Bank of China Shanghai Branch established the "East China Banking School of People's Bank of China" and "Shanghai Banking School".

In early 1955, the two schools merged into "Shanghai Banking School of the People's Bank of China". In 1956, Shanghai Banking School moved to a new location in Suzhou with a new name: "Suzhou Banking School of the People's Bank of China". The school was closed in August 1958. During the six years, it had cultivated more than 2,000 graduates, who were then distributed to 17 provinces and cities throughout the country. These graduates became the pioneers and leaders of the financial field.

==== Shanghai Finance School period ====
Following the requirements from the central government to strengthen financial work, in March 1960, Shanghai Finance Bureau and the People's Bank of China Shanghai branch jointly established Shanghai Finance School. The school was closed down in 1969.

In 1978, it reopened with the new name "Shanghai Finance School" offering three majors: fiscal science, finance, and foreign exchange. In 10 years, it produced more than 1,400 graduates, of which 58% worked in finance and banking departments.

==== Shanghai Banking School period ====
After the Third Plenary Session of the Eleventh CPC Central Committee, to carry out Deng Xiaoping's instruction "let the banks be the truly banks," China's financial system started reforms. In March 1982, Shanghai Finance School was split into Shanghai Banking School and Shanghai Finance School. Under the leadership of the People's Bank of China, the school moved to Minxing Road district in 1984 and school conditions were improved. The school offered programs and majors in finance, insurance, accounting, foreign exchange, etc.

==== Shanghai Finance College period ====
In the early 1980s, the Party Central Committee and the State Council decided to build Shanghai into a financial center — thus Shanghai yearned for Financial Talent. The People's Bank of China worked with the Shanghai Municipal Government to build a financial specialist institution.

In 1987, with the approval of the State Education Ministry, Shanghai Finance School was renamed to Shanghai Finance College; the college insisted on the strategy of "relying on the industry, serving the society" and offered five majors: finance, accounting, auditing, secretary, international finance and insurance. It also bore the task to train the cadres and professionals of the financial industry.

In 1990, China's first securities professionals training base — Shanghai Securities Professional Training Department — was set up in the college. Subsequently, from 1993 to 1995, the college opened three securities specialized classes and cultivated the first batch of security experts with higher education degrees.

==== Promotion to undergraduate university ====
In 2000 the college was transferred to the leadership of the local government. It has actively participated in the overall layout of Shanghai Higher Education and Talent Training. Under the support of the municipal government and related industry departments, it firmly grasped the opportunity of Shanghai International Financial Center Construction and Shanghai Higher Education pilot reform. Shanghai Finance College was then promoted to a university-level institution and was renamed Shanghai Finance College, opening a new chapter.

=== Academics ===
Shanghai Finance College is made up of 11 schools, six departments, and four research institutes. The schools and departments offer courses and award academic degrees.

==== Schools and majors ====
- School of International Finance
  - Finance
  - Financial Engineering
  - Credit Management
- School of International Economics and Trade
  - Economics
  - International Economics and Trade
  - International Business
- School of Accounting
  - Accounting
  - Finance Management
  - Auditing (CPA)
- School of Business Administration
  - Marketing
  - Human Resources Management
  - Business Management
  - Logistics Management
- School of Insurance
  - Insurance
  - Labor and Social Security
- School of Finance and Public Administration
  - Public Finance
  - Taxation
  - Administrative Management
  - Statistics
- School of Information Management
  - Information Management and System
  - Computer Science and Technology
  - E-Business
- Sino-Danish School
  - Marketing
  - International Finance
- School of Continuing Education
  - International Trade
  - Business Administration
  - Administrative Management
  - Accounting
  - Finance
- School of International Exchange
  - International Students Program
  - Study Abroad Program
- School of Innovation and Entrepreneurship

==== Departments and majors ====
- Department of Law
  - Financial Law
  - Economic Law
- Department of Applied Mathematics
  - Financial Mathematics
- Department of Foreign Languages
  - Business English
  - Finance English
- Department of Humanities and Arts
  - Advertising Design
  - Advertisement Design and Making
- Department of Social Sciences
- Department of Physical Education

==== Research institutes ====
- International Financial Research Institute
- Sci-Tech Finance Institute of Shanghai
- SFU-GuoGou Institute, SFU Institute of Finance for FTZ
- Higher Education Research Institute & Editorial Department of Journal of SFU

==== Experimental teaching center ====
In 2002, SFU began experimental teaching of banking simulation. Since then banking simulation has grown rapidly. The Experimental Teaching Center was constructed in 2010 which became a comprehensive experimental teaching base. Nine experimental centers and several laboratories were since added.

=== International education ===
SFU has established cooperative relationships with more than 40 universities and organizations in countries and areas such as the US, Canada, UK, France, Denmark, Finland, Germany, Switzerland, Poland, Hungary, Japan, South Korea, Hong Kong, Macao and Taiwan.

Given that Shanghai has stepped up efforts to build into an international financial center by increasing its support on financial education, SFU as a university with concentration on finance and in close proximity to China (Shanghai) Pilot Free Trade Zone has embarked on an exhilarating new phase of development.
