= Chen Xiaobo =

Chinese politician (born 1965)

- 陈笑波

Deputy Director of the Hainan Provincial Supervisory Commission
- In office January 2018 – October 2024
- Director: Lan Fo'an; Chen Guomeng

Deputy Secretary of the Hainan Provincial Commission for Discipline Inspection
- In office April 2017 – October 2024

Personal details
- Born: November 1965 (age 60) Qingjiang County, Jiangxi, China
- Party: Chinese Communist Party (1991-2025, expelled)
- Education: East China University of Political Science and Law; Cheung Kong Graduate School of Business

Chen Xiaobo (Chinese: 陈笑波; born November 1965) is a former Chinese politician, who served as the deputy secretary of the Hainan Provincial Commission for Discipline Inspection and the deputy secretary of the Hainan Provincial Commission for Discipline Inspection.

== Career ==
Chen was born in Qingjiang County, Jiangxi (now Zhangshu). He was enrolled to East China University of Political Science and Law in 1984, which majored in criminal studies, and gradruated in 1988. After gradruating, he was enrolled to the Jiangxi Provincial Public Security Department. Chen was joined the Communist Party in 1991.

Chen was transferred to Hainan and served as an officer of the Exit-Entry Administration of the Hainan Provincial Public Security Department. In 1996, he served as the town mayor and party secretary of Dongshan, Qiongshan. He also served as the secretary of the Qiongshan Discipline Inspection Commission. In 2003, he was served as the deputy head of the Organization Department of the CCP Haikou Municipal Committee.

In 2006, Chen was served as the mayor of Xiuying District in Haikou, and promoted to the party secretary in 2007. He was transferred to Chengmai County and served as the county head. In 2012, he was appointed as the party secretary of Tunchang County, and transferred to Wenchang in 2015.

In April 2017, Chen was appointed as the deputy secretary of the Hainan Provincial Commission for Discipline Inspection, and concurrent with the deputy director of the Hainan Provincial Supervisory Commission in January 2018.

== Investigation ==
On 10 October 2024, Chen was suspected of "serious violations of laws and regulations" by the Central Commission for Discipline Inspection (CCDI), the party's internal disciplinary body, and the National Supervisory Commission, the highest anti-corruption agency of China. He was expelled from the party and dismissed from the public office on 4 July 2025.

On 20 January 2026, Chen was sentenced to 12 years and fined three million yuan for bribery in 37.35 million yuan.
