= East China University of Political Science and Law =

University in Shanghai, China

Coordinates: 31°13′32″N 121°24′50″E

- 华东政法大学
- Other name: Huazheng (华政)
- Motto: 篤行致知，明德崇法
- Type: Public
- Established: 1952; 74 years ago
- Chancellor: Ye Qing (叶青)
- Faculty: 1,400
- Students: 15,420
- Undergraduates: 12,500
- Postgraduates: 2,920
- Location: Shanghai, China
- Campus: Urban, suburban
- Website: www.ecupl.edu.cn

Chinese name
- Simplified Chinese: 华东政法大学
- Traditional Chinese: 華東政法大學
Transcriptions
Standard Mandarin
- Hanyu Pinyin: Huádōng Zhèngfǎ Dàxué
- Wade–Giles: Hua-tung Cheng-fa Ta-hsüeh

The East China University of Political Science and Law (ECUPL) is a public university in Shanghai, China. It was founded in 1952.

It has three campuses, one in Songjiang University Town in Songjiang District, one in Changning District, and the other in Putuo District.

== History ==
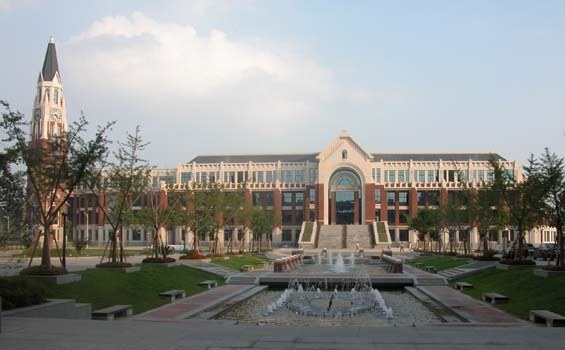
Library building at the Songjiang Campus of ECUPL, in Songjiang University Town

The urban campus is located on the campus of the former St. John's University, an Anglican foundation which was forced to close in the early days of the People's Republic. It also has a new campus housing undergraduate students in the Songjiang University Town, adjacent to the Shanghai International Studies University, Donghua University, Shanghai Institute of Foreign Trade, Shanghai University of Engineering Sciences, Shanghai Lixin University of Commerce, and Shanghai Institute of Visual Art.

ECUPL is one of the few higher education institutions in China specializing in legal education. In the field of legal education, ECUPL enjoys unparalleled influence and prestige in Shanghai and greater East China, which is China's most developed geographical division. ECUPL's alumni are found in virtually every legal profession and institution in East China, such as law firms, governmental agencies, courts, and educational institutions.

Founded in 1952 by Wei Wenbo, ECUPL is one of the first group of higher learning institutions of politics and law established by the People's Republic of China and it used to be one of the higher learning institutions of the Ministry of Justice of PRC. It is now a university jointly administered by the Ministry of Justice and local government, with the local government enjoying the priority of administration. Through the efforts of several generations, ECUPL has gradually developed into a multidisciplinary university of economics, management, finance, foreign languages, etc. with focus on law.

ECUPL now has campuses in three districts: Changning, Songjiang and Putuo, covering an area of 71 hectares (180 acres) and a total building area of 240,000 square meters. At present, ECUPL has four LLD programs, i.e. legal historiography, criminal jurisprudence, economic jurisprudence, and international law, and nine LLM programs of law, i.e. theories of law, legal historiography, constitutional jurisprudence and administrative jurisprudence, criminal jurisprudence, civil and commercial jurisprudence, procedural law, economic jurisprudence, international jurisprudence, environment and resources protection jurisprudence and one LLM program of professional law and on-the-job students are accepted to pursue doctor and master's degrees. ECUPL has 22 majors for bachelors, i.e. law, economics reconnaissance study, finance, administration, English, Japanese, international business and trade, sociology, public security labour and social security, frontier defence management, politics and administration, journalism, public affairs administration, accounting and intellectual property, information science and technology, business administration, cultural industry management, Chinese literature, social work, among which the law major offers undergraduate programs intended for a second bachelor's degree in law.

International economic law and history of law are the key subjects assigned by the Ministry of Justice, and the subject of law is the key subject by the local government. The university has four journals, named, Law, Studies of Crime, Issues of Juvenile delinquency, and the Journal of East China University of Political Science and Law. It also has more than 30 research institutions, studying ancient Chinese legal documents, juvenile delinquency and so on. The library in the university has a collection of books more than 600,000 volumes and has over 1,200 Chinese and foreign journals and magazines. ECUPL has established cooperative relationship with more than 100 overseas colleges and universities, research institutions and legal institutions in the country. There are about 800 faculty members, among whom more than 400 are teaching and research staff and more than 160 are professors or associate professors, and over 10,000 students. It is also a Shanghai Model Unit and Shanghai Garden Unit and its architecture on campus receives special protection from the government.

In December 2013 the school attracted international headlines on news that lecturer Zhang Xuezhong had been expelled. Prior to his dismissal Zhang had provided legal counsel to the New Citizens' Movement and, according to state-controlled media, expressed "political opinions that go against the law."

== International Cooperation and Exchange ==
East China University of Political Science and Law (ECUPL) is always paying much attention to the cooperative exchanges with overseas universities or higher institutions. It has set up joint program with the National University of Singapore and the City University of Hong Kong. Also, it receives students groups annually from the United States and Australia.

Currently, it has signed cooperation agreements with around 35 overseas universities, including Case Western Reserve University School of Law in Cleveland, Ohio in the United States, Wisconsin University of the United States, Willammette University of the United States, Golden Gate University of the United States, Ghent University of Ghent, Vrije University of the Netherlands, Groningen University of the Netherlands, Queensland University of Australia, Bond University of Australia, Kyushu University of Japan, Kumamoto University of Japan, Anshan University of South Korea and so on. Every year, it selects and sends faculty members and students to sister universities for further study and research. Also it encourages graduate and first-year postgraduate students to pursue the LLM degree in overseas universities. At the same time, the East China University of Political Science and Law also maintains good relationships with well-known law firms in Shanghai and world-renowned companies.

The international exchanges and cooperation of ECUPL are becoming increasingly in-depth. As of December 2024, agreements have been signed with 214 universities, institutions, and 9 international and regional organizations including the United Nations Institute for Training and Research and the Asia-Pacific Space Cooperation Organization from 48 countries and regions.

== Organizations ==
The Office of International Criminal Justice has an office at the university.

== Notable alumni ==
Notable alumni of ECUPL include:

- Cao Jianming, Vice Chairman of the Standing Committee of the National People's Congress of the People's Republic of China
- Denning Jin, Partner at King & Wood Mallesons, and "Leading Chinese Lawyer" (2001/2002) Asia Pacific Law 500.
- Wang Zuojun, Partner-in-charge of Shanghai's largest law firm, Allbright.
- Flora Huang, Co-founder and Legal Director of China's first virtual law firm, Ask a Chinese Lawyer.
- Ma Yuanchao, Partner at Zhong Lun and named Up and Coming Lawyer in 2016 and 2017 by Chambers Asia Pacific, a legal guide of the best lawyers and law firms.
- Badiucao, political cartoonist
- Luke Lazarus Arnold, Australian diplomat

== List of presidents ==
1. Wei Wenbo (魏文伯): October 1952 – May 1955
2. Zheng Wenqing (郑文卿): May 1955 – June 1956
3. Lei Jingtian (雷经天): June 1956 – August 1958
4. Wei Ming (魏明): May 1964 – April 1972
5. Xu Panqiu (徐盼秋): June 1979 – April 1984
6. Chen Tianchi (陈天池): April 1984 – August 1985
7. Shi Huanzhang (史焕章): August 1985 – August 1997
8. Cao Jianming (曹建明): August 1997 – December 1999
9. He Qinhua (何勤华): 1999–2015
10. Ye Qing (叶青): 2015–present
