= High School Affiliated to Shanghai University =

School in Shanghai, China

High School Affiliated to Shanghai University Chinese: 上海大学附属中学

Information
- School type: High school
- Principal: Zhang Xuelin; Chinese: 张雪霖
- Staff: 138
- Enrollment: 1697
- Affiliation: Shanghai University

The High School Affiliated to Shanghai University (Chinese: 上海大学附属中学) is the high school affiliated with Shanghai University, located in Baoshan District, Shanghai, near the main campus of the university.

It is a boarding school. The school has 1,697 students and 138 teachers and staff. Its principal is Zhang Xuelin (张雪霖).
