= Lei Jingtian =

Lei Jingtian (Chinese: 雷经天) (1904–1959) was a Chinese military personnel, a communist leader, and President of the East China University of Political Science and Law.

== Early life ==
In 1904, Lei was born in Nanning, Guangxi, China.

== Education ==
In 1919, Lei participated in the May 4 Movement. In 1923 he enrolled in Xiamen University before transferring to the Great China University in Shanghai in 1924. In 1925 he was introduced by Yun Daiying into joining the Chinese Communist Party and participated in the May 30 Movement that year.

== Career ==
In 1926, after receiving a position at the Whampoa Military Academy, Lei participated in the Northern Expedition as a member of the National Revolutionary Army's 6th Army.

Lei participated in the Nanchang Uprising of August 1, 1927 and the Guangzhou Uprising in December 1927. In 1929 he became the chairman of the communist base during the Baise Uprising in Guangxi. In 1931, at the end of his term, Lei left the Chinese Communist Party. In 1934 Lei joined the Long March.

In 1935, Lei was re-inducted into the Chinese Communist Party at Yan'an, Shaanxi Province. Lei later participated in the Battle of Jinan in Shandong Province and Huaihai Campaign.

== Personal life ==
In 1959, Lei died in Shanghai, China.

Preceded by Zhang Wenqing	President of East China University of Political Science and Law; 1956–1958	Succeeded by Wei Ming
