= Piers Maxwell Dudley-Bateman =

Australian painter and academic (1947–2015)

- Born: Piers Maxwell Dudley-Bateman; 30 November 1947; Perth, Western Australia
- Died: 4 September 2015 (aged 67) off Newcastle, New South Wales
- Known for: Painter
- Movement: Landscape expressionism

Piers Maxwell Dudley-Bateman (also known as Piers Bateman, 30 November 1947 – 4 September 2015) was an Australian landscape painter. He was a member of The Antipodeans, a group of Melbourne painters that also included Arthur Boyd, David Boyd, Charles Blackman, John Brack, Robert Dickerson, John Perceval and Clifton Pugh. He taught as a Professor for painting at the Shanghai Institute of Visual Art under Fudan University in Shanghai, China.

== Early life ==
At the age of nine Bateman moved with his family to Victoria and grew up in the bohemian art community of Eltham, Victoria. Eltham is well known for its connection with Australian artists such as David Boyd, Arthur Boyd, John Perceval, Albert Tucker, Neil Douglas, Matcham Skipper and Clifton Pugh among many others. In 1966 Bateman left Australia for London where he commenced painting receiving encouragement from notable Australian artists David and Arthur Boyd.

On returning to Australia in 1968 Bateman was offered his first major exhibition at the newly opened Munster Arms Gallery. This exhibition received a warm response from the Melbourne Herald art critic Allan McCulloch. The resulting sales enabled the young Bateman to buy 30 acres of bush at St. Andrews on the outskirts of Melbourne, where he built a studio of mud brick. This bush setting exerted a powerful influence on his work.

In the immediate following years he often visited the waterfront areas of Williamstown, Port Melbourne and Mornington, painting and developing a fascination for the sea. A painting from this time "Scallop Boats Mornington" was purchased by the Reserve Bank of Australia for its permanent collection.

Bateman became noticed by Australian art collectors and was recognised and encouraged by established artists such as Vic O'Conner and Charles Blackman. Blackman in particular helped Bateman establishes connections in the Sydney art community. An invitation to participate in a survey exhibition of Australian Art at the Cremorne Gallery Sydney and a painting acquired by the Caterpillar Foundation in Chicago further helped his growing recognition as an emerging landscape painter.

1988 Bateman was "discovered" by Andrew Peacock who at the time was fighting a close election with Prime Minister Bob Hawke. Peacock bought a collection of his works and later encouraged Bateman to visit the US when Peacock became the Australian Ambassador in Washington. The Australian Embassy subsequently 1998 acquired two paintings, one of them a bush mural for the conference room. 1999 he was invited to be the Australian representative at the International Contemporary Art Fair I, also known as MARB ART in Marbella Spain.

== "Back to the Bush" Landscape Expressionism Movement ==
Bateman came to be known for his landscape work.

Mervyn Moriarty was a strong influence giving intellectual basis to much of Bateman's intuitive approach to painting particularly in regard to his understanding of colour. Also this period proved to be very influential on Bateman's approach to the landscape where he experimented with an aerial perspective to his iconic outback paintings giving a new and evocative view of the flat landscape. This aerial perspective approach to the landscape was also explored by the Australian painter Fred Williams.

1980 Bateman ventured on a trans Australian painting exhibition with sculptor Marcus Skipper to Broome Western Australia via Alice Springs and the Tanami Desert returning through the Kimberley, Darwin and Cairns. Due to the adverse physical conditions of this trip he experimented with gouache and acrylic as a medium for the first time. Working on large canvases in oil back in his studio, these gouache impressions were the basis of his 'Red Desert' series which brought him wide recognition in Australia.

In 1981 Comalco Australia extended an invitation to visit their Weipa operations giving further opportunity to explore remote areas of Australia. Later that year he was guest of Pilbara Resources Ltd. At their Marble Bar project in Western Australia.

In 1988 Bateman was "discovered" by Andrew Peacock who at the time was fighting a close election with Prime Minister Bob Hawke. Peacock bought a collection of his works and later encouraged Bateman to visit America when Peacock became the Australian Ambassador. The Australian Embassy subsequently 1998 acquired two paintings, one a large (4 x 2-metre) Bush Mural for the conference room. Eventually six of Bateman's works were exhibited in the Australian Ambassador's Residence when Peacock lived there.

Bateman sold his Bush studio at St. Andrews, which, after a battle with the local council due to its lack of building permits was subsequently placed on a heritage register as building of historical significance. The property was bought by Dr. Frank Pierce the prominent Melbourne surgeon and his artist wife Jan. Dr. Pierce died when the property was destroyed in the 2009 Black Saturday bush fires

In 1997 Bateman spent three weeks Painting in Eritrea with Photographer Bill Mosley, journalist Thornten McCamish and Documentary Film Maker Brent Masters. Exhibition of the resulting work was later shown that year in Melbourne at Delshan Gallery and Gallery 235 Sydney.

In 1998 Bateman traveled by road across America from California to Washington D.C., painting desert landscapes along Historic Route 66.

In 1999 Bateman held exhibition at the Embassy of Australia Washington D.C. Later the same year he was invited to be the Australian representative at the Contemporary Art Fair in Marbella, Spain.

== Death ==
Piers died with his brother-in-law in a boating mishap whilst sailing from Broken Bay to North Arm Cove in NSW. His body was found washed ashore on an isolated part of Stockton Beach north east of Newcastle on late Friday September 4, 2015. The exact circumstances that led to their death were widely reported to be a "mystery".

== Public Collections ==
- Reserve Bank of Australia
- University of Melbourne
- Australian Embassy, Washington, D.C.
- Caterpillar Foundation

== Exhibitions ==
- 1968 Eltham Studio opened by Neil Douglas.
- 1969 Munster Arms Gallery, Melbourne
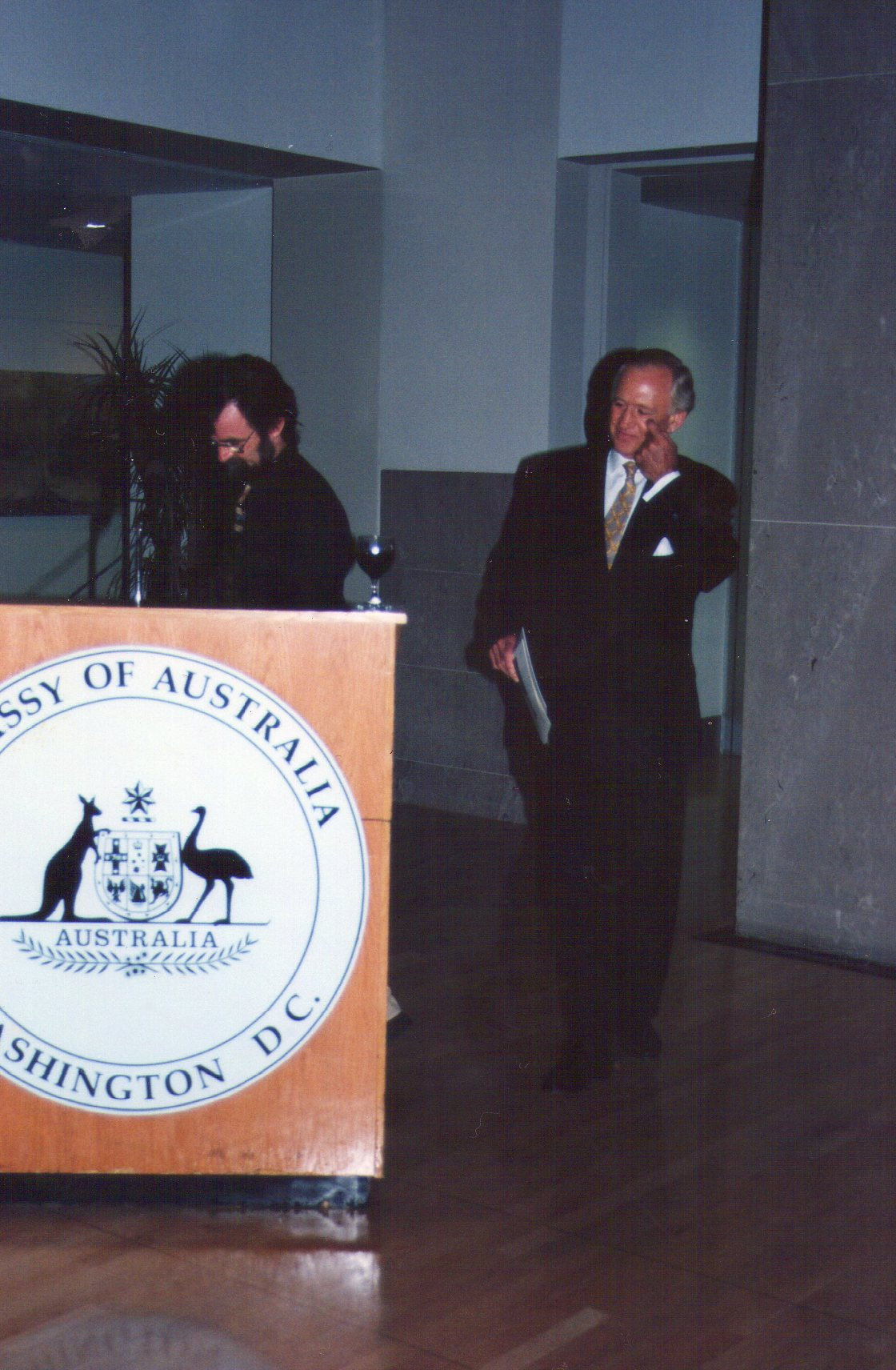
  Piers Bateman Making a Speech at Australia Embassy With Andrew Peacock
- 1970 Munster Arms Gallery, Melbourne
- 1971 Cremorne Gallery, Sydney N.S.W.
- 1972 Von Bertouch Gallery, Newcastle N.S.W.

- 1973 Mosman Gallery, Sydney N.S.W.
- 1974 Von Bertouch Gallery, Newcastle N.S.W.
- 1975 Mosman Gallery, Sydney N.S.W.
- 1976 Manyung Gallery, Victoria
- 1977 Von Bertouch Gallery, Newcastle N.S.W.
- 1978 Abercrombie Gallery, Melbourne
- 1979 Abercrombie Gallery, Melbourne
- 1980 Rex Irwin Galleries, Sydney
- 1981Greenhills Gallery, Perth
- 1982 Melbourne Art Exchange, Victoria
- 1985 La Naya, Alicante, Spain
- 1985 Warwick Stocks Galleries, Sydney
- 1986 Melbourne Fine Art Galleries
- 1987 Melbourne Fine Art Galleries
- 1988 Art Met Sydney N.S.W
- 1989 Melbourne Art Exchange
- 1990 Montsalvat Galleries, Victoria
- 1991 Melbourne Fine Art, Victoria
- 1991 Eltham WireGrass Gallery, Victoria
- 1992 Delshan Gallery, Melbourne
- 1993 Delshan Gallery, Melbourne
- 1994 Delshan Gallery, Melbourne
- 1995 Delshan Gallery
- 1996 Delshan Gallery
- 1997 Delshan Gallery
- 1997 Gallery Gallery 235, Sydney
- 1998 Soho Galleries Drysdale Vic.
- 1999 Feria Internationale de arte Contemporaneo, Malaga
- 2001 Redhill Gallery Brisbane
- 2003 Redhill Gallery Brisbane
- 2005 Redhill Gallery Brisbane
- 2008 Redhill Gallery Brisbane
- 2008 "Small Pictures from Australia" Chen Gallery, Moganshan Rd Art Complex Shanghai China
- 2010 "Journey in Paint" Survey Exhibition, Montsalvat Victoria
- 2012 "Landscape and Rhythm" Survey exhibition, Shanghai Institute of Visual Art, China
- 2012 "Australian Landscapes", Eegoo Art Complex, Shanghai, China
