= Wei Ming =

Wei Ming (Chinese: 魏明) (1908 – August 22, 1982) was President of East China University of Political Science and Law. He was born in Hejian, Cangzhou, Hebei Province. He joined the Chinese Communist Party in 1934. In February 1938, he was made a leader of the anti-Japanese resistance government of Hejian during the Second Sino-Japanese War. In May 1938, he was made leader of Xin'an County.

Preceded by Lei Jingtian	President of East China University of Political Science and Law; 1964–1972	Succeeded by Xu Panqiu
