= Therese Wai Han Shak =

Founder of the Ming-Ai Institute

Therese Wai Han Shak Ed.D., M.A., M.Ed., B.A. (Hons)
- 石慧嫻
- Born: Lee Ho-Yee; 18 March 1932; Unknown
- Died: 21 March 2010 (aged 78); Lourdes, France
- Other name: Therese Ho Yee Shak
- Education: G.C.I.E., University of Hull M.Ed., University of Hong Kong Ph.D., University of British Columbia

Chinese name
- Simplified Chinese: 石慧娴
- Traditional Chinese: 石慧嫻
Transcriptions
Standard Mandarin
- Hanyu Pinyin: Shí Huìxián
- Wade–Giles: Shih^{2} Hui^{4}-Hsien^{2}
Hakka
- Romanization: Sek^{6} Wäi^{4} Han^{4}

Therese Wai Han Shak (traditional: 石慧嫻) is the founder of the Ming-Ai (London) Institute. Shak's origins in mainland China, inherited wealth, connections to the Catholic Church and passion for contemporary education allowed her to become highly influential in Chinese educational reform and UK-China relations.

== Childhood ==
Born in south central China on 18 March 1932, at birth Shak's name was originally Lee Ho-Yee. She was baptized in 1942 when she was ten years old and thereafter had her name changed. Therese was baptised by Rev. Edmund Sullivan at St. Therese's Church, Kowloon, Hong Kong. The surname "Shak" was acquired through her stepfather Shak Chung-Shan (traditional: 石鐘山) (Christian name: Joseph Stephen Shak). The fate of Therese's biological father Lee Shui-Chuen (Chinese: 李小泉) is unknown.

Therese's mother, Shak Wong Fung-Lin (traditional: 石黃鳳蓮), married Shak Chung-Shan before moving with Therese and her sister and brother, to Hong Kong. It is thought that Fung-Lin and Chung-Shan had two daughters, one of whom, Catharine Shak, had learning difficulties.

== Family ==
Born in 1901 Therese Shak's stepfather Shak Chung-Shan overcame humble beginnings to become a successful businessman. At the age of nine he and six other siblings were orphaned.

In 1920, at 19 years of age Chung-Shan was the Principal of Sacred Heart Canossian College (traditional: 聖心書院). Shak Chung-Shan was the founder of two film companies Naam Wa Motion Picture Company (traditional: 南華影片公司), which produced movies from 1935 to 1940 and Wa Ngai Motion Picture Company (traditional: 華藝音頻公司; simplified: 华艺影片公司; pinyin: Huá-Yì Yīnpín Gōngsī).

After World War II in 1947 Chung-Shan invested HK$2,000,000 into Lai Chi Kok Hotel (traditional: 荔枝角酒店) expanding the 0.7 hectare enterprise to an eleven hectare estate which became Lai Chi Kok Amusement Park (traditional: 荔枝園遊樂場) and operated from 1948 until the land was reallocated for public housing by the Hong Kong Government in 1997.

Shak Chung-Shan was well recognised for his contributions to the Catholic Church and received and an award in 1953 from Pope Pius XII in January. His wife, Shak Wong Fung-Lin who is also Therese's mother, died that same year. Born in 1908, Shak Wong Fung-Lin died February aged 45. Her remains are interred in St. Michael Cemetery in Happy Valley, Hong Kong.

One month after the death of Shak Wong Fung-Lin, Therese's stepfather remarried Tso Pin-Chun (traditional: 左聘君) in May 1953. She was 37 years old and came from Beijing, at the time was the headmaster of Ho Tung Technical School For Girls (traditional: 何東女子職業學校). Pin Chun and Chung-Shan had one son together.

Shak Chung-Shan died in 1958 and raised a total of five children, two boys and three girls. His daughter Leung Man-fong (simplified: 梁文芳) founded Shak Chung Shan Memorial Catholic Primary School (traditional: 石鐘山紀念小學) in his memory in 1997.

== Research ==
After the death of her mother, 21 year old Therese W. H. Shak began her undergraduate degree at the University of Hong Kong. Shak completed her Bachelor of Arts in English 1957.

In 1963 Shak was awarded a Graduate Certificate in Indigenous Education from the University of Hull aged 31.

In 1972 Shak received her Master of Arts from the University of Hong Kong. Her thesis, A study of errors in the written English of Learners in Anglo-Chinese Secondary Schools in Hong Kong, explored the relationship between word length and grammatical errors in Anglo-Chinese.

In 1982 Shak received a Master's of Education from the University of Hong Kong. Her thesis, Administrative Arrangements and a Curriculum for a University Training Programme for Adult Educators in Hong Kong, addressed the requirements of adult education assessed though various research methods.

In 1984 Shak began to undertake a Ph.D. at the University of British Columbia, delivering her doctoral defence in 1989 aged 57. Her doctoral thesis titled Lifelong Education: Definition, Agreement and Prediction follows on from the Faure Report and UNESCO's 1972 model for lifelong education. The thesis then became the basis of her book ‘Lifelong Education: Consensus in Characteristics & Practices’ published in September 2009.

In July 1994 Shak resumed post-doctoral research at the University of Hong Kong following her Ph.D. under the guidance of Professor Kai-Ming.

== Career in Hong Kong ==
After obtaining her undergraduate degree from the University of Hong Kong, Shak appears to have immediately pursued a career in professional teaching. Therese's work history from 1957 to 1969 is not well known however she taught in St. Joan of Arc School, Hong Kong in this time alongside attending the University of Hull in 1963.

In 1969 Shak worked in a senior administrative capacity at the Hong-Kong Caritas Higher & Adult Education Service, a position she held for 22 years until 1991; even after she relocated to the United Kingdom in 1989. While working here between 1969 and 1991 Shak also obtained her M.A., M.Ed. and PhD.

== Career in Overseas Chinese Community ==
Therese's sister Catherine Shak experienced a traumatizing event in June 1989. As a result, Therese relocated to the United Kingdom to care for Catharine and left her position at the Hong-Kong Caritas Higher & Adult Education Service shortly after delivering her doctoral defence at University of British Columbia, Canada. Despite living in Golders Green from 1992 until her death in 2010, Therese's country of residence was France for much or all of this time.

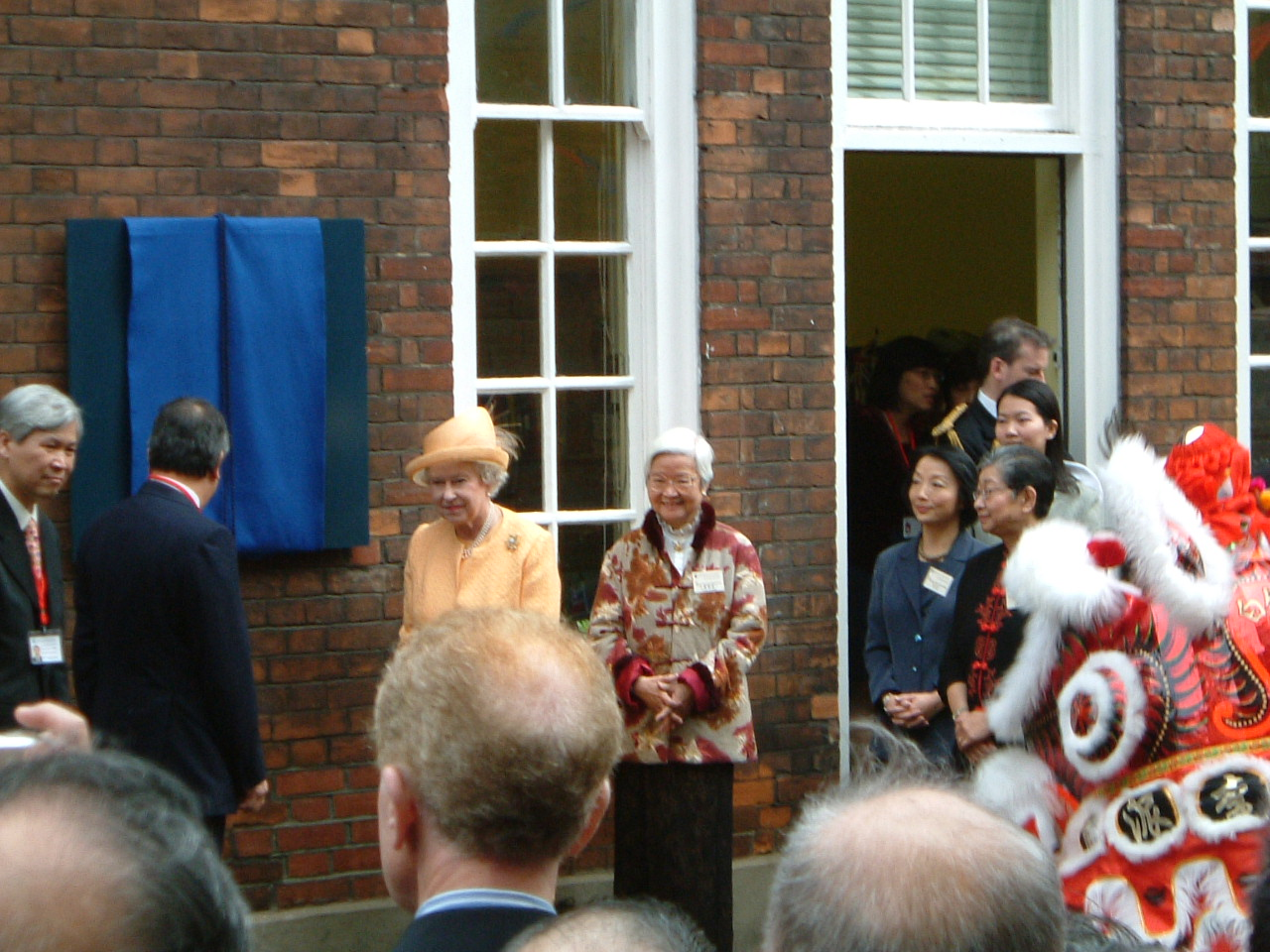
Dr. Therese Wai Han Shak beside Queen Elizabeth II at the opening of Camden Chinese Community Centre

In October 1992 the Fung Shan Foundation was founded in the memory of Shak Chung-Shan and Shak Wong Fung-Lin by Therese and her sister Catherine. With support from Roman Catholic Diocese of Westminster, UK and Caritas Hong Kong the foundation financed the establishment of the Ming-Ai Association and the Ming-Ai (London) Institute that same year. Shak would remain the Dean of the Ming-Ai (London) Institute for the duration of her natural life.

Shak was a founding member and Chairperson of the East Asian Forum for Adult Education (EAFAE) founded in December 1993 in response the growing need for collaboration in Adult Education across East Asia seminars include representative from Mainland China, Taiwan, Hong Kong, Japan, Korea, Singapore, Macau, Thailand and Malaysia.

In January 1995, Therese lost her sister, Catharine Shak who died in Middlesex. Catharine was a founding patron of the Ming-Ai (London) Institute.

In September 1996, Shak become the director of the Camden Chinese Community Centre. She would maintain this role for the rest of her life and serve a year as a Secretary from 2002 to 2003. The community centre was officially opened in 2005 by Queen Elizabeth II.

Shak was also involved in the establishment of other various cultural centres which are no longer operational in the UK and France. In 1999 Shak became the director of the Sino-UK Education Association. In 2001 Shak became the director of the Camden Training Network. In 2007 Shak founded the St. Thomas More Ming-Ai College. Each of these ventures appear to have been short lived and have since been dissolved.

== Death and legacy ==
Therese Shak died on 21 March 2010 aged 78, the day after her birthday, in Lourdes, France. Her memorial mass as held on 31 May 2010 at the Cathedral of Immaculate Conception, Hong Kong. The Rev. John B. Tsang (traditional: 曾慶文神父) presided at the mass. Her ashes joined those of her mother, Shak Wong Fung-Lin in St. Michael Cemetery in Happy Valley, Hong Kong. In memory of Shak's death obituaries were published in The Gazette, chineseineurope.net as well as other websites.
