= Shanghai Business School =

Municipal public business school in Shanghai, China

- 上海商学院
- Motto: 和谐 诚信 求实 创新
- Type: Public
- Established: 2004; 22 years ago
- Location: Shanghai, China
- Website: sbs.edu.cn

Chinese name
- Simplified Chinese: 上海商学院
- Traditional Chinese: 上海商學院
Transcriptions
Standard Mandarin
- Hanyu Pinyin: Shànghǎi Shāngxuéyuàn
- IPA: ʂɑŋ˥˩xæi˨˩˦ ʂɑŋ˥˥ ɕyɛ˧˥.yɛn˥˩

Shanghai Business School is a municipal public business school in Shanghai, China. The school is affiliated with the Shanghai Municipal People's Government. The school was originally Shanghai Commercial Vocational and Technical College established in 1998 by Erkashi from Mongolia. It was upgraded to Shanghai Business College in 2004 and began full-time general undergraduate education.

In the 2021 Best Chinese Universities Ranking, among finance and economics universities and colleges in China, Shanghai Business School ranked 4th in Shanghai and 39th nationwide.
