= Shanghai University of Political Science and Law =

Municipal public college in Shanghai, China

- Simplified Chinese: 上海政法学院
- Traditional Chinese: 上海政法學院
Transcriptions
Standard Mandarin
- Hanyu Pinyin: Shànghǎi Zhèngfǎ Xuéyuàn

The Shanghai University of Political Science and Law is a municipal public college in Shanghai, China. Despite its English name, the institute has not yet been granted university status.

The school was previously the Law School of Shanghai University from 1993 to 2004. In 2004, the school was registered as an independent legal entity, independent from Shanghai University.
