= Shanghai Polytechnic University =

University in Shanghai, China

- Simplified Chinese: 上海第二工业大学
- Traditional Chinese: 上海第二工業大學
Transcriptions
Standard Mandarin
- Hanyu Pinyin: Shànghǎi Dìèr Gōngyè Dàxué

Shanghai Polytechnic University (上海第二工业大学), also known as the Shanghai Second Polytechnic University, is a public university in Shanghai. It was founded in 1960.

Founded in 1960, SSPU is an institution of higher education featured by engineering as its main discipline, with synchronized development of multi-disciplines, including Economics, Management Science, Literature and Natural Sciences. The university provides education of undergraduates, higher vocational students, master, international students and students of adult and further education..

In 2010 SSPU was granted the qualification to enroll international students.

In 2011 the university was approved by Academic Degree Committee of the State Council as the Engineering master's degree pilot work unit.

In 2013, SSPU was listed in the institutions to administer "Shanghai Government Scholarships for International Students". The university offers 20 categories under 6 disciplines, with 33 undergraduate programs and 30 higher vocational programs. Its staff totals about 1,100. Currently about 17,000 students are registered at SSPU.

Over the years, SSPU has established cooperative relationship with universities and institutions in the US, the UK, Germany, France, Sweden, Finland, Australia, Japan, South Korea, Malaysia, Thailand, Indonesia, the Philippines, etc. and also with Hong Kong and Taiwan.

Through channels such as international cooperation and bilateral exchanges, educational concepts at home and abroad and experience in education are introduced and integrated. Innovation and deepening of educational reform is promoted. Internationalization of education and educational level of the university are increased gradually.
