= Shanghai University Law School =

Law school in Shanghai, China

Shanghai University Law School, operated by the Shanghai Judicial Bureau and Shanghai University, is one of the largest law schools under university in China. Authorized by the Shanghai Municipal Government, the Shanghai Administrative Institute of Politics & Law (SACIPL), and Shanghai University, the school is operated under one administration with multiple programs.

The school has developed into a multi-level, multi-program and multi-disciplinary law school with several unique features. The school offers a top-notch legal education to undergraduates and graduates, as well as to vocational students and adult learners.

Doctoral candidates may now choose from two tracks: sociology-social psychology and criminal sociology. At the master's level, two programs in criminal law and constitutional and administrative law are available. One double-bachelor's degree program is offered, and one undergraduate program featuring four concentrations is also available. Students may choose to focus on law, economic law, international law or trade and criminal justice.
