= Shanghai University of Engineering Science =

Municipal public university in Shanghai, China

- 上海工程技术大学
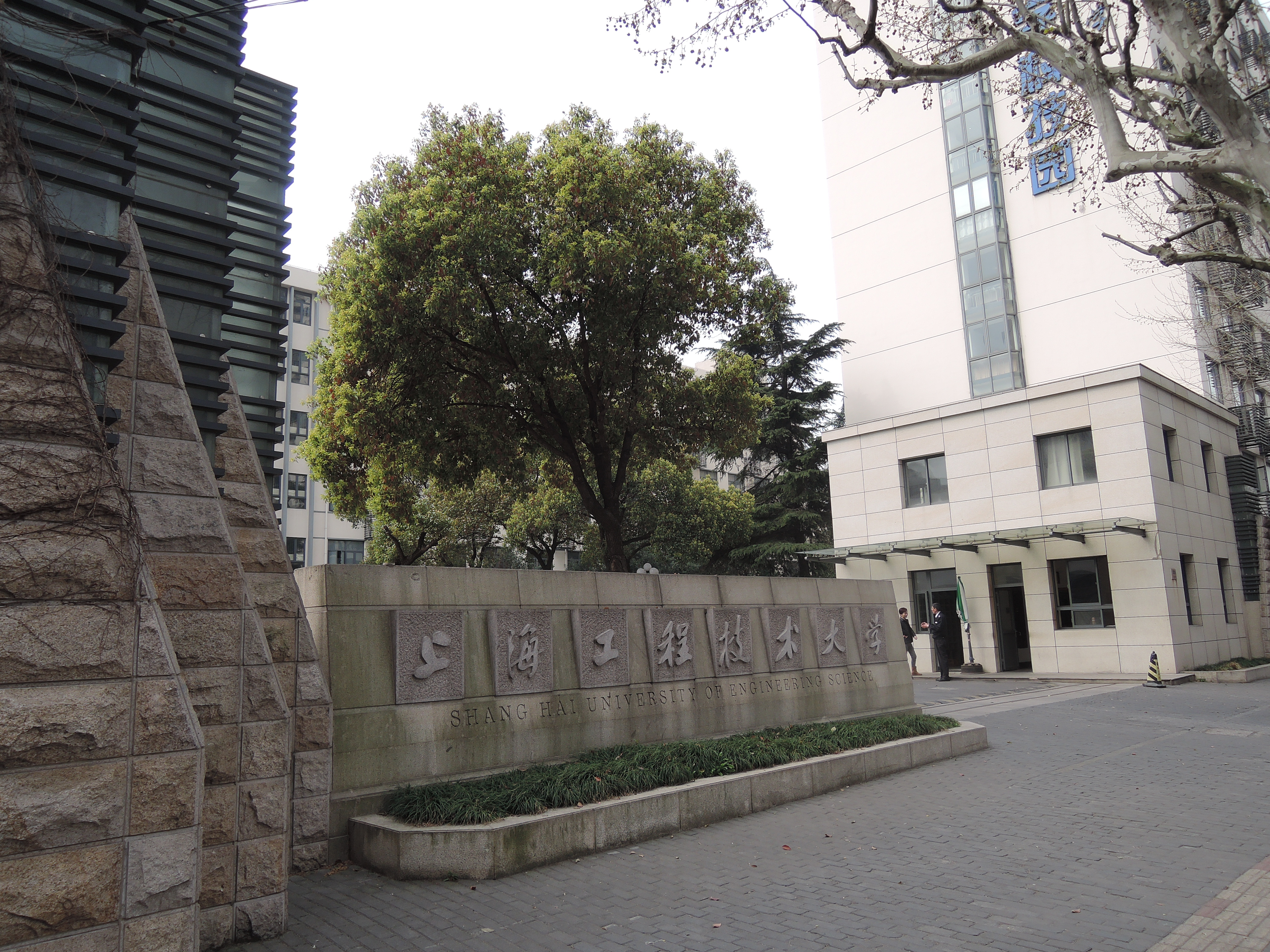
- Motto: 勤奋 求是 创新 奉献
- Motto in English: Diligence, Adherence to Fact, Innovation, Devotion
- Type: Public
- Established: 1978; 48 years ago
- President: Ding Xiaodong (丁晓东)
- Academic staff: approximately 900
- Students: approximately 18,000
- Location: No. 333 Longteng Rd., Songjiang District, Shanghai (Songjiang Campus); No. 350 Xianxia Rd., Changning District, Shanghai (Xianxia Campus); No. 58 Yixian Rd., Hongkou District, Shanghai (Higher Vocational College); Shanghai, China
- Campus: 94.55 ha (233.6 acres)
- Nickname: 工程大, Gōngchéngdà; 工技大, Gōngjìdà
- Website: www.sues.edu.cn

Shanghai University of Engineering Science
- Simplified Chinese: 上海工程技术大学
- Traditional Chinese: 上海工程技術大學
Transcriptions
Standard Mandarin
- Hanyu Pinyin: Shànghǎi Gōngchéng Jìshù Dàxué

The Shanghai University of Engineering Science (SUES; 上海工程技术大学; 'Shanghai Engineering Technological University') is a municipal public university located in Shanghai, China. It is affiliated with the Shanghai Municipal People's Government.

The school was originally established in 1978 under the name of Shanghai Jiao Tong University Electrical & Mechanical Branch (上海交通大学机电分校) and merged with a branch of the East China Textile Institute of Science and Technology (华东纺织工学院) in 1985.

The most distinguished subjects of SUES include materials science, mechanical engineering, management studies, art design, etc.

== History ==
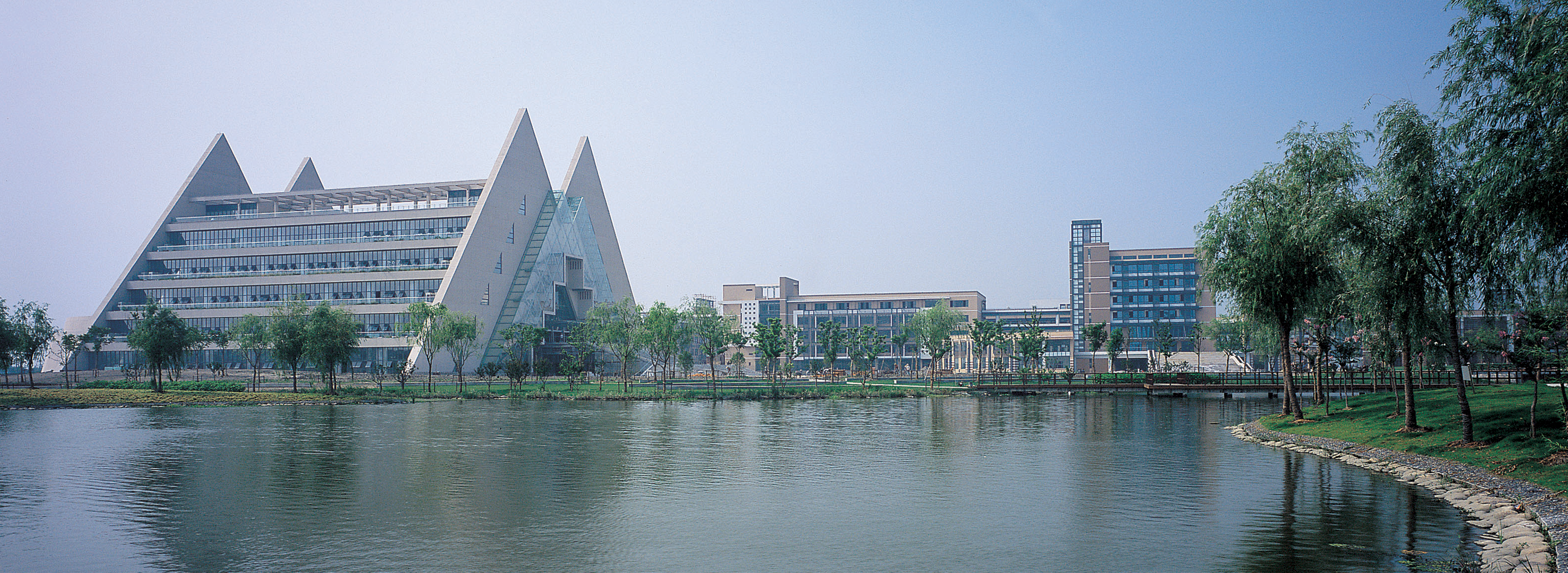
Shanghai University Engineering Science Campus building. Designed by Lee/Timchula Architects.

In October, 1978, Shanghai Jiao Tong University, the First Bureau of Shanghai Mechanical and Electrical Industry, the Second Bureau of Shanghai Mechanical and Electrical Industry, Jiangnan Shipyard, East-China Electric Management Bureau, Transportation Bureau, the government of Changning District, Shanghai co-founded Shanghai Jiao Tong University Electrical and Mechanical Branch. East-China Textile Institute of Science and Technology, Textile Industry Bureau of Shanghai, the government of Putuo District, Shanghai, co-founded a branch of East-China Textile Institute of Science and Technology.

== Teaching and research ==
There was no English-based engineering undergraduate programs available before 2020. All engineering courses were in Chinese In 2020, 3 majors was added as English taught Majors for International students.

=== Schools and sections ===
- School of Mechanical Engineering
- School of Electrics and Electronics
- School of Management studies
- School of Chemistry and Chemical Engineering
- School of Material Engineering
- School of Automotive Engineering
- School of Art and Design
- School of Fashion Engineering
- School of Urban Rail Transportation
- Sino-French Institute of Fashion Design
- Sino-Korean School of Multi-media Design
- School of Fundamental Studies
- School of Advanced Vocational Education
- School of Advanced Technician
- School of Social Science
- Teaching Section of Sports
- School of Adult Education

=== Teaching and training bases ===
- Shanghai Automotive Engineering Training Center (Key Laboratory of Shanghai Municipality)
- Computer Center
- Engineering Training Center
- Art Design Exhibition Center
- Fashion Design Exhibition Center

=== Organizations of scientific research ===
- Institute of Energy and Environmental Engineering
- Institute of Laser Industrial Technology
- Institute of Chemical Engineering
- Institute of Economy
- Research Center of Labor Relations Research Center of Nanometer-technology
- Shanghai Research Center of Social Security
