= Shanghai University =

Municipal public university in Shanghai, China

Coordinates: 31°19′6″N 121°23′14″E

- 上海大学
- Type: Municipal public university
- Established: 1994; 32 years ago
- Affiliations: NAHLU
- President: Liu Changsheng
- Students: 56,753
- Location: Shanghai, 200444, China
- Campus: Urban
- Colors: Shangda Blue
- Nickname: Shangda (上大)
- Website: shu.edu.cn en.shu.edu.cn

Shanghai University
- Simplified Chinese: 上海大学
- Traditional Chinese: 上海大學
Transcriptions
Standard Mandarin
- Hanyu Pinyin: Shànghǎi Dàxué
- Wade–Giles: Shang-hai ta-hsüeh

Shanghai University (SHU) is a municipal public university in Shanghai, China. It is owned by the Shanghai Municipal People's Government. The university is part of Project 211 and the Double First-Class Construction.

== History ==
Shanghai University traces its historical origins to a university of the same name founded in Shanghai on 23 October 1922.

The present-day institution was established in 1994 through the merger of Shanghai University of Technology, Shanghai University of Science and Technology, the former Shanghai University, and Shanghai Institute of Science and Technology.

== Campuses ==
The university's three principal campuses are located in Baoshan District, Yanchang in Jing'an District, and Jiading District. The main university library is on the Baoshan campus. The university library system holds more than four million volumes.

== Academics and research ==
Shanghai University is a comprehensive, research-intensive university whose teaching and research cover the humanities, social sciences, natural sciences, engineering, business, law and the arts. It offers undergraduate and postgraduate education and operates a number of research institutes.

== International cooperation ==
Shanghai University jointly operates the SILC Business School with the University of Technology Sydney. The school was founded in 1994 and was among the earlier Sino-foreign joint business schools established in China.

University rankings
BCUR National	Domestic	48
Wu Shulian National	Domestic	37
QS National	General	28
THE National	General	30–33
USNWR National	General	39
QS Asia (Asia version)	General	=84
USNWR Asia	General	64
ARWU World	Research	201–300
QS World	General	=465
THE World	General	401–500
USNWR World	General	=296

== See also ==
- Category:Shanghai University alumni
- List of universities in China
- High School Affiliated to Shanghai University
- Japan Campus of Foreign Universities
- Shanghai University Law School
