= Shanghai University of International Business and Economics =

Municipal public university in Shanghai, China

- 上海对外经贸大学
- Former names: Shanghai Foreign Trade College (上海对外贸易学院)
- Motto: 诚信 宽容 博学 务实
- Motto in English: Integrity, leniency, erudition, pragmatism
- Type: Public university
- Established: 1960; 66 years ago
- President: Wang Rongming
- Academic staff: 1,500
- Students: 14,000
- Location: Songjiang, Shanghai, China
- Website: www.suibe.edu.cn

Chinese name
- Simplified Chinese: 上海对外经贸大学
- Traditional Chinese: 上海對外經貿大學
Transcriptions
Standard Mandarin
- Hanyu Pinyin: Shànghǎi Duìwài Jīngmào Dàxué

The Shanghai University of International Business and Economics (SUIBE; 上海对外经贸大学) is a municipal public university in Shanghai, China. It is affiliated with the City of Shanghai and funded by the Shanghai Municipal People's Government.

The school was originally founded in 1960. The school was granted university status in 2013 and was known as Shanghai Foreign Trade College (上海对外贸易学院) before that.

== See also ==
- List of universities and colleges in Shanghai
