= Donghua University =

Public university in Shanghai, China

Coordinates: 31.2035°N 121.4143°E

- 东华大学
- Former names: East China Institute of Textile Technology (1951–1985); China Textile University (1985–1999)
- Motto: 崇德博学，励志尚实
- Motto in English: Virtue & Learning, Inspiration & Factuality
- Type: Public research university
- Established: 1951; 75 years ago
- President: Yu Jianyong
- Faculty: 1,336
- Administrative staff: 2,209
- Students: 28,497
- Undergraduates: 14,204
- Postgraduates: 6,822 (including 1,045 doctoral students)
- Other students: 4,827 international students
- Location: Shanghai, China
- Campus: Changning District and Songjiang District, Shanghai
- Website: dhu.edu.cn

Donghua University
- Simplified Chinese: 东华大学
- Traditional Chinese: 東華大學
Transcriptions
Standard Mandarin
- Hanyu Pinyin: Dōnghuá Dàxué

University rankings
BCUR National	Domestic	74
Wu Shulian National	Domestic	91
THE National	General	32–37
QS Asia (Asia version)	General	251–260
THE Asia (Asia version)	General	109
ARWU World	Research	401–500
THE World	General	501–600
USNWR World	General	464

Donghua University (DHU, 东华大学) is a public university in Shanghai, China. It is affiliated with the Ministry of Education. The university is part of the Double First-Class Construction and Project 211.

Formerly known as China Textile University, the institution emphasizes not only the original materials science program but also engineering, management, and design disciplines.

== History ==
Founded in June 1951, Donghua University was originally named the East China Institute of Textile Technology (华东纺织工学院). In September 1985, the institute changed its name to China Textile University (中国纺织大学) and changed it once again to Donghua University in August 1999. The word "Donghua" literally means East China.

It has been a national key university since 1960 and was one of the educational institutions in China authorized to confer all three levels of degree: bachelor's, master's, and doctorate degrees.

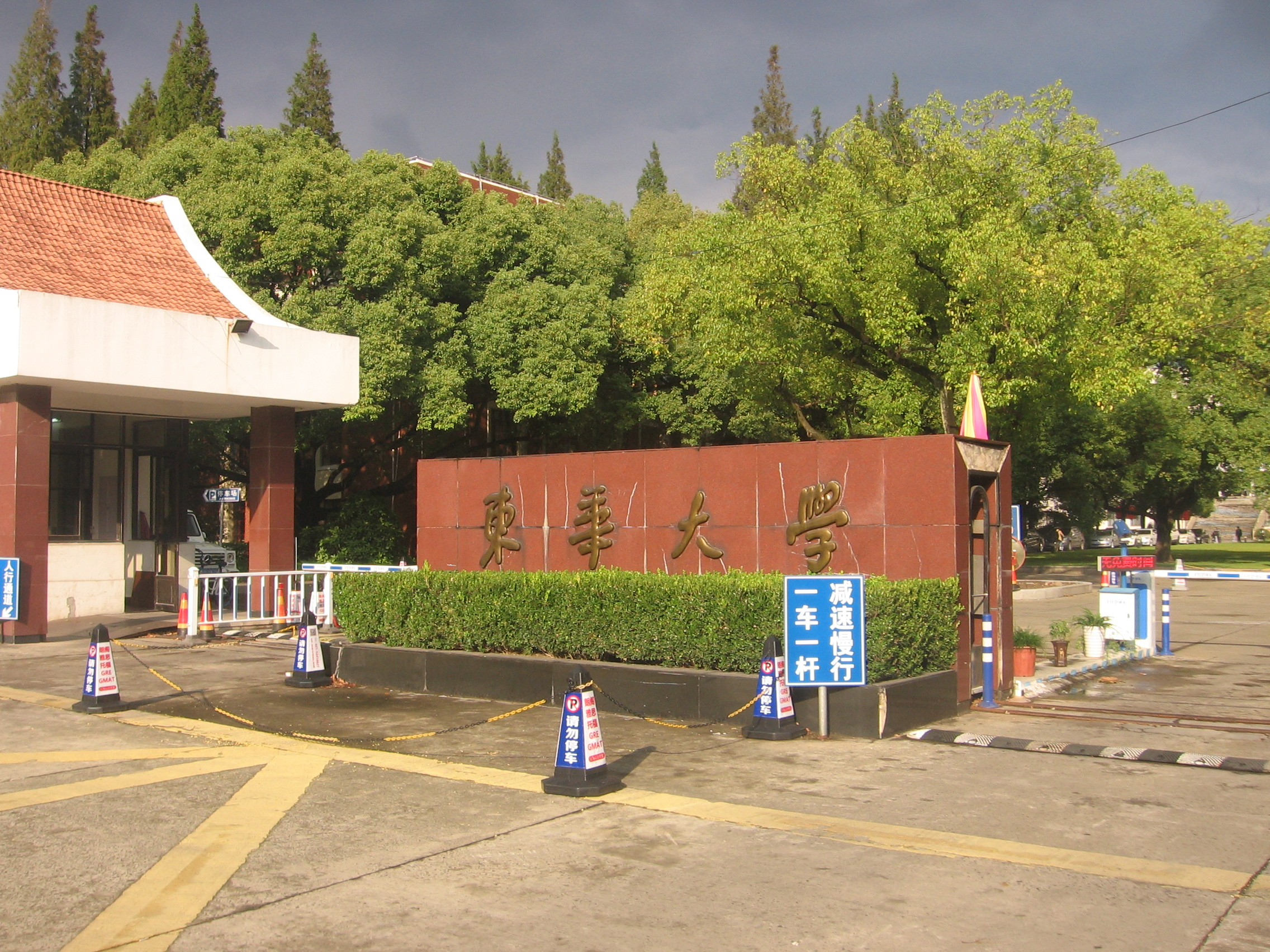
Main Entrance of West Yan'an Road Campus

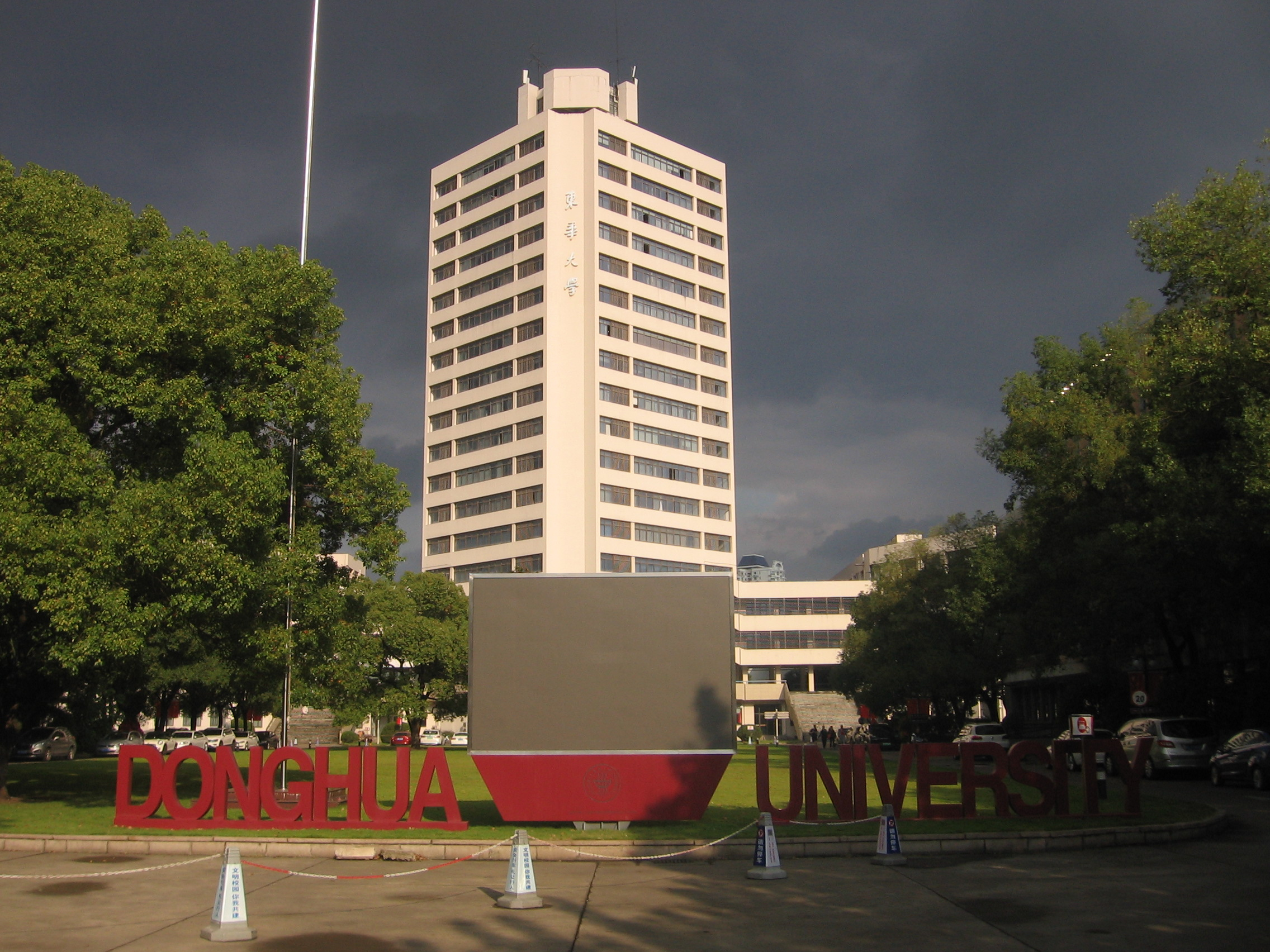
West Yan'an Road Campus

== Campuses ==
Donghua University has two campuses: one in Changning District and the other in Songjiang District in Shanghai. Most bachelor courses are taken in the Songjiang district.

The Changning Campus is the older one, and it has a tunnel under it going along Xinhua Road.

== Rankings and reputation ==
As of 2025, Donghua University is ranked among the world's top 500th universities according to some of the most-widely read university rankings in the world, such as the Academic Ranking of World Universities and the U.S. News & World Report Best Global University Ranking. It is ranked as the top 1 school for Textile Engineering, Fiber Materials Science, and Fashion Design in China in the recognized Best Chinese Universities Ranking.

== International engagement ==
Donghua is considered as an international university; ranking top 5 in the list of most international-friendly universities in China. Being amongst the first Chinese universities to accept international students, Donghua University is no stranger to the needs of international students like Shanghai Summer School participants. To date, Donghua University has hosted international students from almost 140 countries.

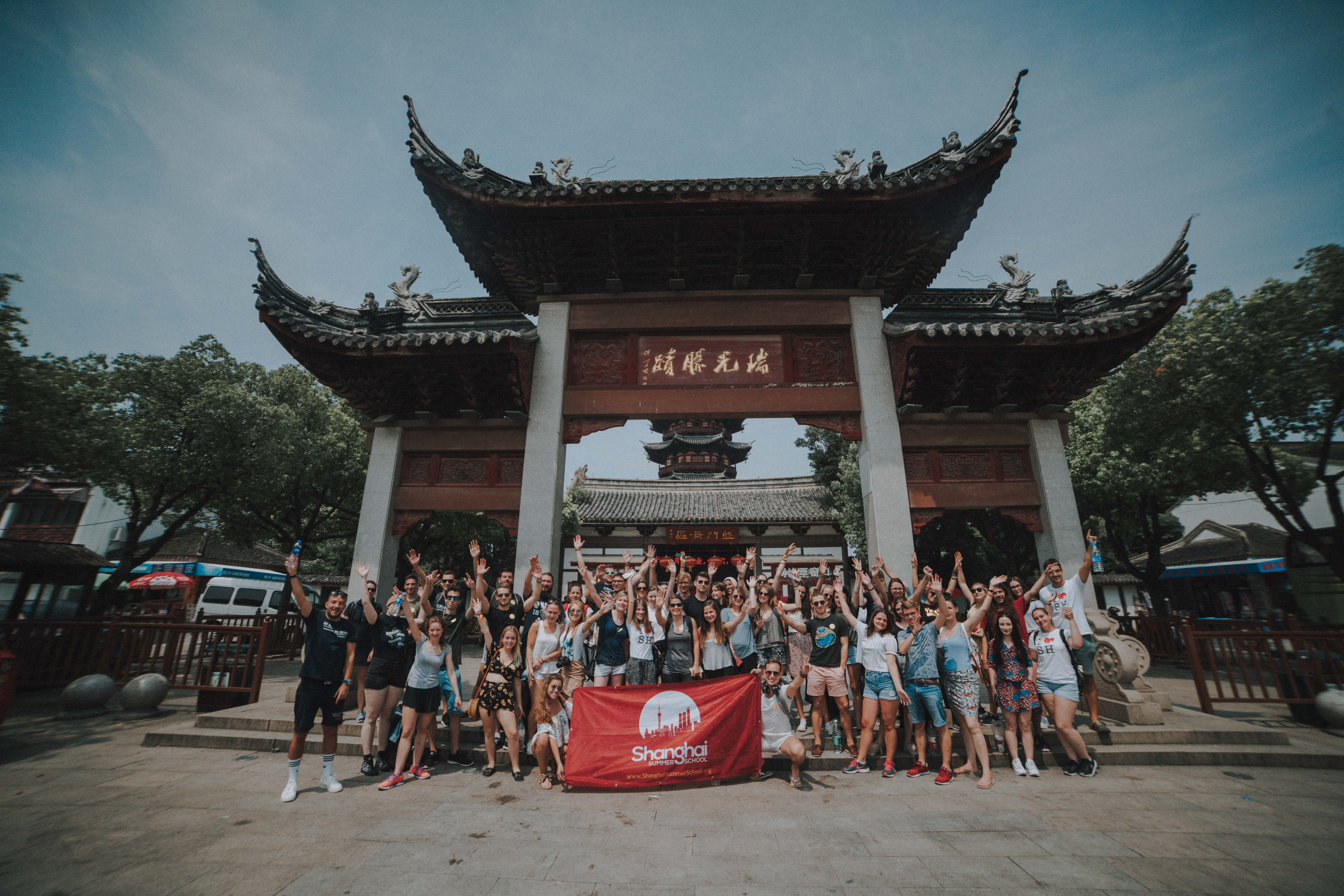
Donghua University Summer School
