= Jiufen Shengming Temple =

Temple in Ruifang, New Taipei, Taiwan

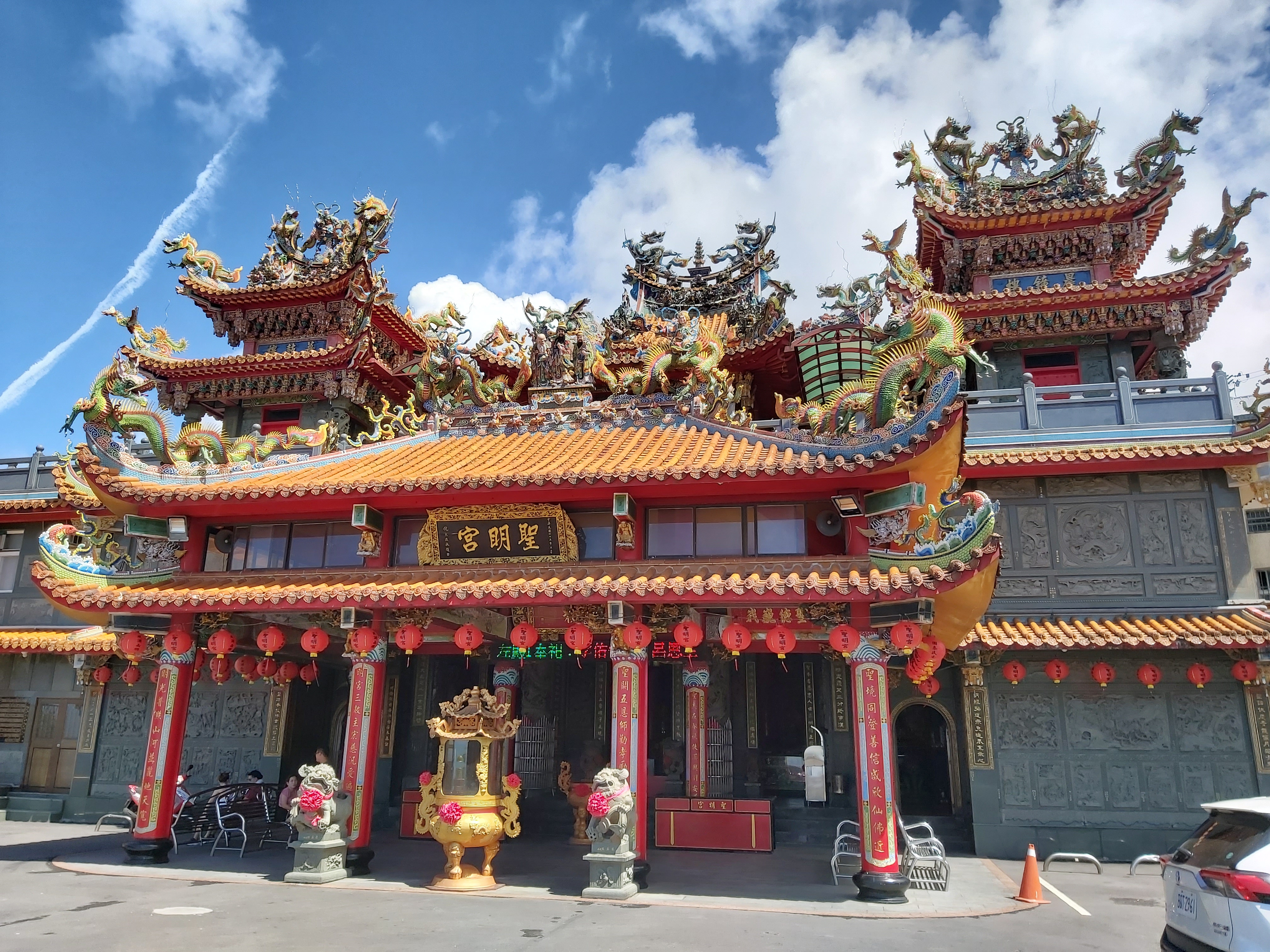
- The temple's exterior, 2024

Location
- Interactive map of Jiufen Shengming Temple
- Coordinates: 25°06′28″N 121°50′39″E

Jiufen Shengming Temple is a temple in Jiufen, Taiwan.

== See also ==
- List of temples in Taiwan
