= Taipei National University of the Arts =

University in Taipei, Taiwan

- 國立臺北藝術大學
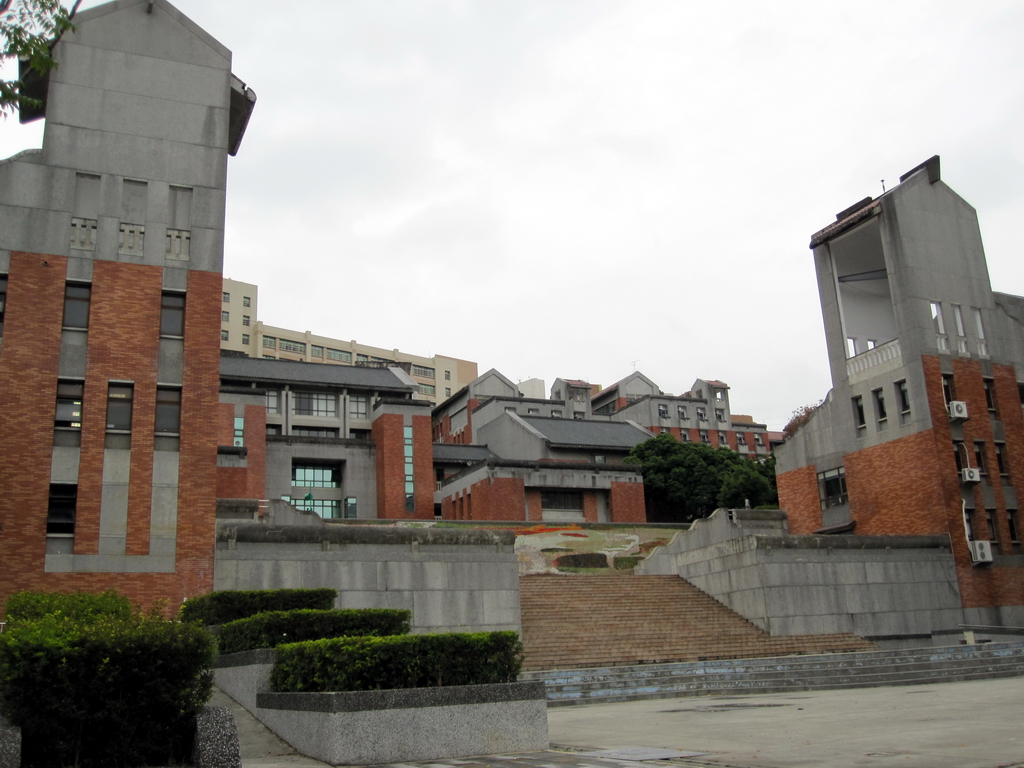
- Former names: National Institute of the Arts
- Type: Public university
- Established: 1 July 1982 (as National Institute of the Arts); 1 August 2001 (as TNUA)
- President: Chen Kai-huang
- Vice-president: Lee Chia-yi
- Location: 25°08′01.6″N 121°28′17.6″E
- Website: tnua.edu.tw

Chinese name
- Traditional Chinese: 國立臺北藝術大學
Transcriptions
Standard Mandarin
- Hanyu Pinyin: Guólì Táiběi Yìshù Dàxué

The Taipei National University of the Arts (TNUA; Chinese: 國立臺北藝術大學) is a national university in Guandu, Beitou District, Taipei, Taiwan.

== History ==
The preparatory committees to establish the school was formed on 22 October 1980. The National Institute of the Arts (Chinese: 國立藝術學院) was then founded on 1 July 1982 as an institute of higher learning for the arts. The institute was housed in Luzhou, Taipei County (now New Taipei City), from 1985 until its relocation in 1991 to its permanent campus in Kuandu, Taipei. The institute was renamed Taipei National University of the Arts in 2001.

== Faculties ==
- School of Music
- School of Fine Arts
- School of Theatre Arts
- School of Dance
- School of Film and New Media
- School of Cultural Resources
- School of Humanities
- Music and Image Trans-disciplinary Program

== Research Centers ==
- Center for Traditional Arts
- Center for Art and Technology
- Performing Arts Center
- Center for Arts Resources & Educational Outreach

== Presidents ==
- Pao You-yu (July 1982 – July 1991)
- Ma Shui-long (August 1991 – August 1994)
- Liu S. Lian (September 1994 – August 1997)
- Chiu Kun-liang (October 1997 – January 2006)
- Ju Tzong-ching (August 2006 – July 2013)
- Yang Chyi-wen (August 2013 – July 2017)
- Chen Kai-huang (since August 2017)

== Campus ==
The campus buildings are designed in a neo-Chinese classical style. Aside from the colleges and departments, the university houses a Music Hall, the Performing Arts Center, including a theater hall and a dance recital hall, the Kuandu Museum of Fine Arts, a library, an Olympic-size swimming pool, the Center for the Study of Traditional Arts, a computer center and the Center for the Study of Art and Technology.

== Events ==
Festivals organized by TNUA or using its campus:

- Guandu Arts Festival
- Guandu Flower Festival (Guandu Flower Art Festival)
- Kuandu Film Festival
- Kuandu International Animation Festival
- Kuandu Lights Festival

== International and local cooperation ==
Asia
Taiwan

- National Tsing Hua University
- National Taiwan University of Science and Technology

Mainland China

- Central Academy of Drama
- Beijing Film Academy
- Shanghai Institute of Visual Art
- Shanghai Conservatory of Music
- Shanghai Theatre Academy
- Guangzhou Academy of Fine Arts
- Hangzhou Normal University
- Central Conservatory of Music
- Nanjing University of the Arts

Hong Kong

- The Hong Kong Academy for Performing Arts

Japan

- Tokyo University of Arts
- Ochanomizu University
- Kyoto University of the Arts
- Kyoto Seika University
- Okinawa Prefectural University of Arts
- National Museum of Ethnology (Japan)
- Tama University

Republic of Korea

- Korea National University of Arts
- Chonnam National University
- Sungshin Women's University
- Hongik University

Singapore

- Lasalle College of the Arts

Thailand

- Chulalongkorn University
- Burapha University

Israel

- Tel Aviv University

Philippines

- Mindanao State University – Iligan Institute of Technology

Oceania
Australia

- Griffith University
- Royal Melbourne Institute of Technology
- Edith Cowan University
- Queensland University of Technology

Europe
Austria

- University of Music and Performing Arts, Vienna
- Konservatorium Wien
- Universität Mozarteum Salzburg

Czech Republic

- Academy of Fine Arts in Prague

Finland

- Sibelius Academy
- Academy of Fine Arts, Helsinki

France

- École nationale supérieure des Beaux-Arts de Paris
- École Nationale Superieure d’Art de Bourges
- French National Museum of Natural History
- Oriental Cultural Heritage Sites Protection Alliance

Germany

- Hochschule für Musik Detmold
- Universität Kassel

Poland

- Akademia Sztuk Pięknych w Warszawiei
- Państwowa Wyższa Szkoła Filmowa, Telewizyjna i Teatralna im. Leona Schillera w Łodzi (PWSFTviT)
- The Aleksander Zelwerowicz State Theatre Academy

Russia

- The Moscow Tchaikovsky Conservatory

United Kingdom

- Northumbria University
- The Arts University College at Bournemouth
- University of the Arts London

America
United States

- Rutgers, the State University of New Jersey
- State University of New York
- University of Michigan
- University of Illinois Urbana-Champaign
- Ohio State University
- Goucher College
- Chapman University

Canada

- University of British Columbia

== Name censorship ==
In 2016, the Hong Kong Government's Leisure and Cultural Services Department was criticized as in breach of freedom of expression for blocking use of the university name in any form that included the word 'National'/'國立'. The department, responsible for most of the territory's arts venues, told TNUA graduate Law Shuk-yin, an art administrator and executive producer for drama company The Nonsensemakers, that she could not use the name in her biography in promotional material for her production at a theatre it managed.

== Honorary doctors of art ==
Notable Honorary Doctors of Art from TNUA include cellist and conductor Mstislav Rostropovich, composer Ma Shui-long, choreographer Lin Hwai-min, and theatrical set designer Ming Cho Lee.

== Notable alumni ==
- Hsiao Ya-chuan, film director
- Hsieh Ying-hsuan, actress
- Jacklyn Wu, actress
- Huang Kuo-shu, member of Legislative Yuan
- Jag Huang, actor
- Jian Man-shu, actress, screenwriter and director
- Kaiser Chuang, actor
- Lin Jeng-yi, Director of National Palace Museum (2016–2018)
- Wu Kuo-chu, Taiwanese choreographer
- Chen Shu-ming, artist

== See also ==
- List of universities in Taiwan
