= Jiufen Mingsheng Temple =

Temple in Jiufen, Ruifang, New Taipei, Taiwan

Coordinates: 25.11116°N 121.84447°E

- 九份明聖宮
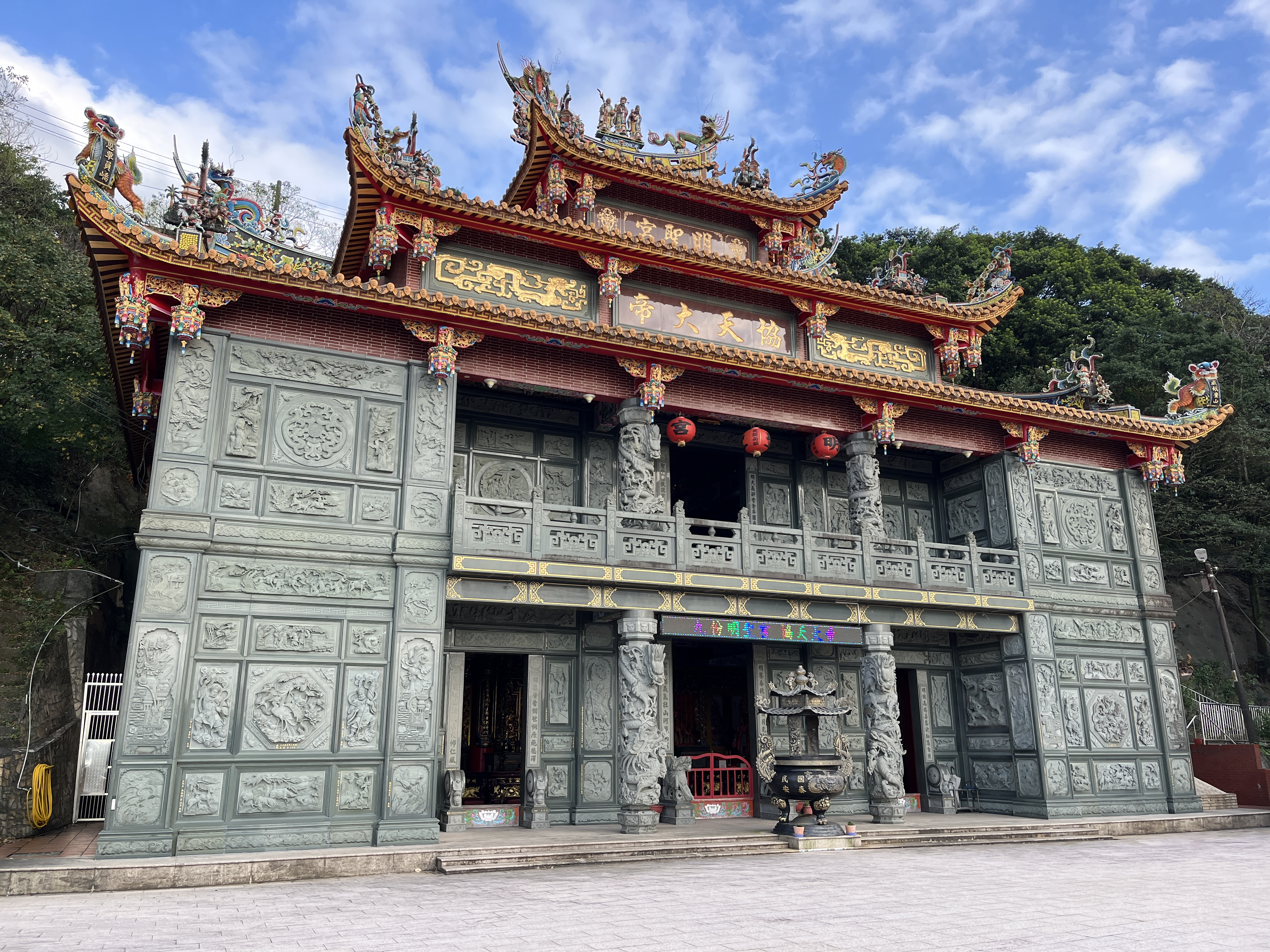
- The temple's exterior in 2024

Location
- Country: Taiwan
- Interactive map of Jiufen Mingsheng Temple

Jiufen Mingsheng Temple (Chinese: 九份明聖宮), also known as the Mingsheng Temple (Chinese: 九份明聖宮), is a temple in Jiufen, Taiwan. Attendees worship Guan Yu, and there is a statue of him in the temple. Originally called the Quanzhong Hall (Chinese: 勸忠堂), the temple was built in 1948, moved in 1950, and given its current name in 1976.

== See also ==
- List of temples in Taiwan
