= Jiufen Jinshanyan =

Temple in New Taipei, Taiwan

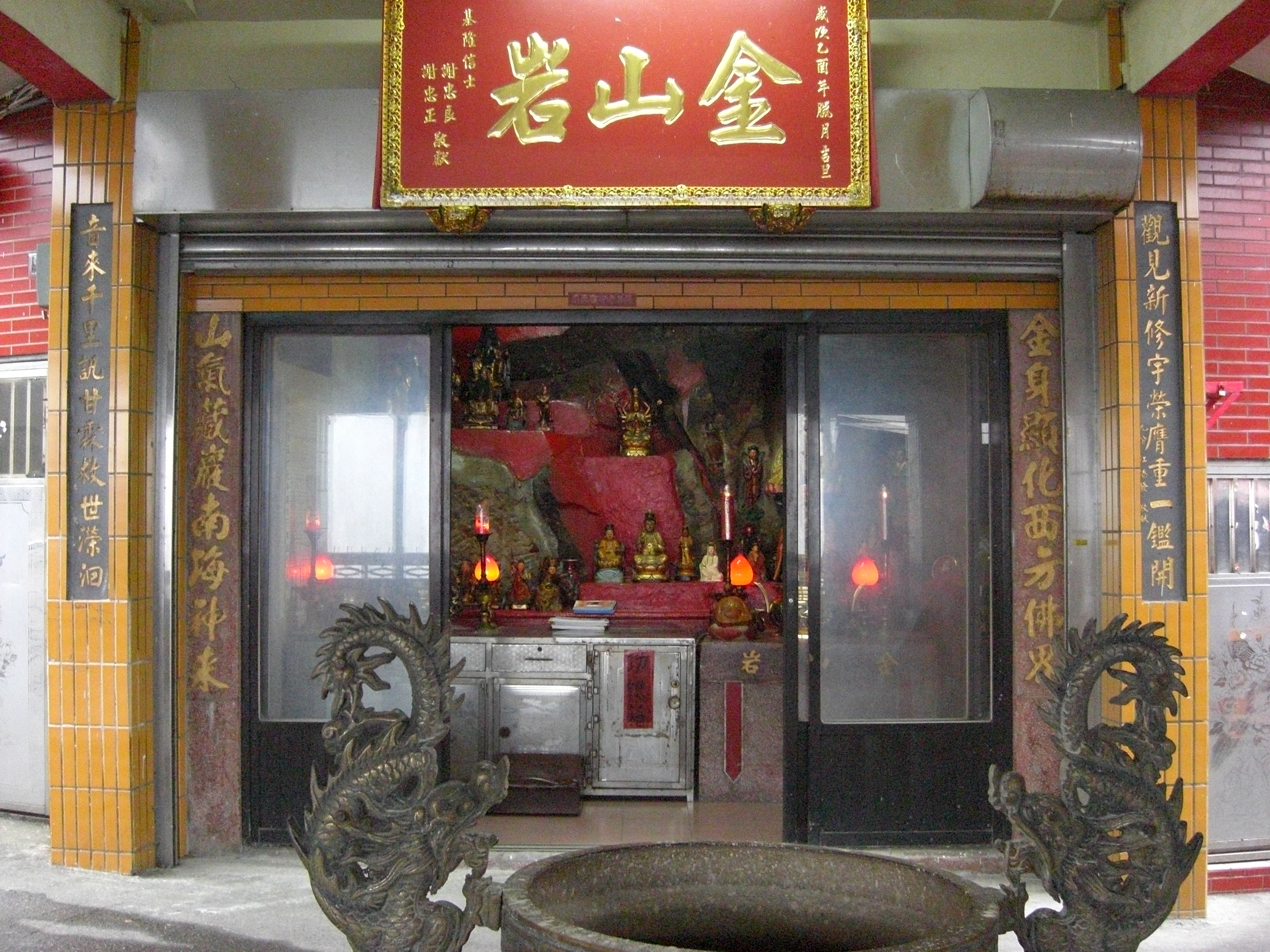
- 2007

Location
- Country: Taiwan
- Interactive map of Jiufen Jinshanyan

Jiufen Jinshanyan is a temple along Jiufen Old Street, in New Taipei, Taiwan.

== See also ==
- List of temples in Taiwan
