= Yang Chyi-wen =

Taiwanese politician

Yang Chyi-wen (Chinese: 楊其文) is a Taiwanese academic administrator and politician. He was the founding chairman of the Taiwan Action Party Alliance, a political party active from August 2019 to January 2020. Between 2013 and 2017, Yang was president of the Taipei National University of the Arts.

== Academic career ==
Yang Chyi-wen earned a master's degree in architecture from Ball State University in 1982, followed by a master of arts from the school's Department of Theatre the next year. He then completed a master of fine arts from Indiana University in 1985. Yang began teaching at Taipei National University of the Arts when it was still known as the National Institute of the Arts and has served the school in multiple administrative capacities, including as director of various university centers, as dean, and as president. While on the TNUA faculty, Yang was the artistic director of the Kuandu Arts Festival, an event led by the school. He served as president of TNUA between 2013 and 2017. During his tenure, Yang raised concerns with the description of TNUA in a brochure, as alumnae Luo Shu-yan was due to perform in Hong Kong, and the Leisure and Cultural Services Department had asked that her alma mater be listed simply as Taipei University of the Arts. In July 2016, Yang signed a memorandum of understanding regarding cooperation with Mongolian State University of Arts and Culture.

== Political activity ==
Yang is a member of the Northern Taiwan Society, a cultural organization supportive of the Taiwan independence movement. As president of the Taipei National University of the Arts, he often wrote editorials on art, culture, and politics, several of which were translated and appeared in the Taipei Times. After Yu Shyi-kun declined the chairmanship of the Taiwan Action Party Alliance, members of the newly formed political party elected Yang party chairman on the date of its founding assembly, 18 August 2019. TAPA was dissolved on 19 January 2020.

== Personal life ==
Yang is married to Patricia Che.
