= Wu Kuo-chu =

Taiwanese choreographer (1970–2006)

- 伍國柱
- Born: August 18, 1970; Kaohsiung, Taiwan
- Died: 6 January 2006 (aged 35); Taipei, Taiwan
- Education: Taipei National University of the Arts; Folkwang Hochschule
- Occupation: Choreographer

Wu Kuo-chu (Chinese: 伍國柱; pinyin: Wǔ Gúozhù; 18 August 1970 – 6 January 2006) was a Taiwanese choreographer.

== Life ==
Wu was born in Kaohsiung in 1970. After studying and working at the Taipei National University of the Arts, He attended the dance academy Folkwang Hochschule in Essen, Germany, which influenced most of his future work. During this period he gained fame in Germany for his choreographies and in 2002 he received the dance prize from the foundation Josef und Else Classen Stiftung.

In June 2004 his first work Fuge was performed on the occasion of the Folkwang Tanzabend. He created many choreographies with the Taiwanese company Cloud Gate Dance Theater, which he went with on a tour to Hong Kong and Taiwan. He also choreographed for the Wuppertaler Opernhaus and for the Folkwang Hochschule.

In 2004, Wu became dance director at the Staatstheater Kassel, with his own company, composed by dancers of Folkwang.

== Death ==
Wu died of leukemia in Taipei on 6 January 2006.

In June 2006 Malou Airaudo, a former dancer in Pina Bausch's company, premiered Windschatten, a work she choreographed as homage to Wu Kuo-chu.

== Works ==
- Tantalus
- Fuge
- Oculus
