= Jiufen Zhaoling Temple =

Taoist temple in Jiufen, Ruifang, New Taipei, Taiwan

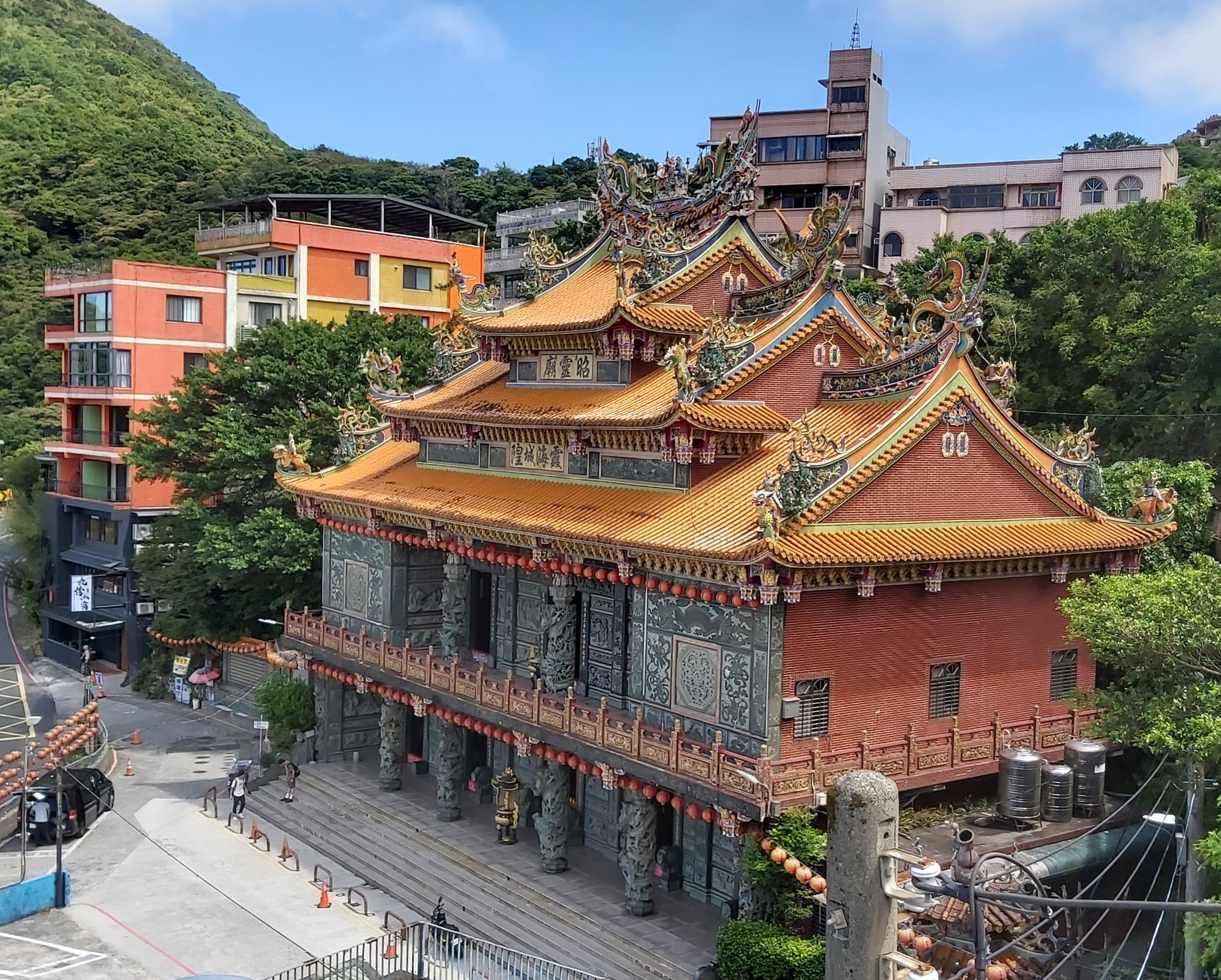
- The temple's exterior, 2024

Location
- Country: Taiwan
- Interactive map of Jiufen Zhaoling Temple
- Coordinates: 25°06′38″N 121°50′45″E

Jiufen Zhaoling Temple is a Taoist temple in Jiufen, Taiwan.

== See also ==
- List of temples in Taiwan
