= Ma Shui-long =

Taiwanese composer (1939–2015)

Ma Shui-long (Chinese: 馬水龍; pinyin: Mǎ Shuǐlóng; 17 July 1939 – 2 May 2015) was a Taiwanese composer, whose work is known for blending Western instrumentation with Asian pentatonic melodies.

He was born in Keelung. As a child, Ma was raised in Keelung and Jiufen. He attended a vocational high school in Keelung until his father fell ill. Ma then found work at a factory, where a colleague, Lee Che-yang, convinced Ma to pursue music. Until the age of 17, and his enrollment at the National Taiwan Junior College of the Arts in 1959, Ma was largely self-taught in music. After graduating in 1964 from what became the National Taiwan University of Arts, Ma became a music teacher and joined the Sunflower Group. He then attended the Regensburg Music Academy in Germany on scholarship. Upon his return to Taiwan in 1971, Ma joined the Soochow University faculty. Ma began teaching at his alma mater in 1981. In 1986, Ma received the Fulbright scholarship and went to the United States. He was awarded a National Award for Arts in 1999 and a National Cultural Award in 2007.

Bernard Holland once praised Ma for "letting his instruments speak in a European voice but with an Asian mind." Much of Ma's work was inspired by beiguan, nanguan, and Taiwanese opera. Among his best-known works are Rainy Harbor Sketch and Bamboo-Flute Concerto. He is the first Taiwanese composer to have had his work performed at the Lincoln Center for the Performing Arts. Ma died at the age of 75 on 2 May 2015. His remains were cremated four days later.
