= Taiwan Action Party Alliance =

Political party in Taiwan, 2019–2020

Taiwan Action Party Alliance 一邊一國行動黨
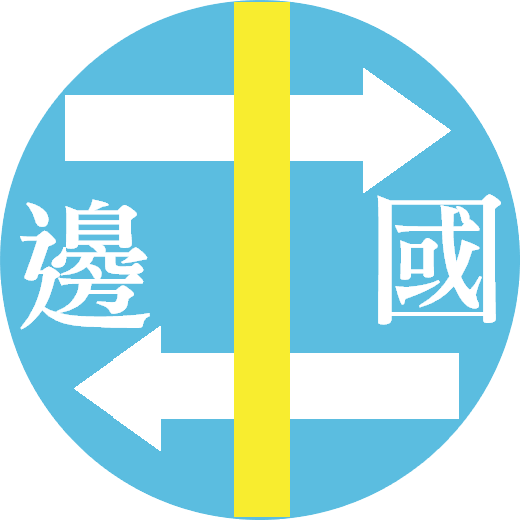
- Abbreviation: TAPA
- Secretary-General: Hsu Lung-chun
- Spokesperson: Janice Chen
- Spiritual leader: Chen Shui-bian
- Chairman: Yang Chyi-wen
- Convener: You Si-kun
- Founders: Kuo Chang-feng; Janice Chen; Kuo Cheng-deng; Yang Chyi-wen (1st leader)
- Founded: 22 August 2019
- Dissolved: 19 January 2020
- Preceded by: Justice Alliance
- Headquarters: No. 142, Section 4, Zhongxiao East Road, Da'an District, Taipei City, Taiwan
- Ideology: Taiwan independence One Country on Each Side
- Political position: Big tent
- Colours: Turquoise; Yellow
- Slogan: "Promote Taiwan to become a modern country with independent sovereignty and apply to join the United Nations as a member state." (Note: In local languages: Traditional Chinese script: 促使台灣成為主權獨立的現代化國家，並申請加入聯合國成為會員國。; Mandarin Pinyin: Cùshǐ táiwān chéngwéi zhǔquán dúlì de xiàndàihuà guójiā, bìng shēnqǐng jiārù liánhéguó chéngwéi huìyuán guó.)

Website
- tapa.tw

The Taiwan Action Party Alliance (TAPA) (Note: In local languages: Traditional Chinese script: 一邊一國行動黨; Mandarin Pinyin: Yī Biān Yī Guó Xíngdòng Dǎng) was a political party in Taiwan established on 18 August 2019 and dissolved on 19 January 2020.

== Founding ==
In July 2019, Chen Shui-bian stated on Facebook that he was "pleased to see the birth of a new political party, the ‘One Country on One Side Action Party." This was a literal translation of the party's Chinese name, which derives from the One Country on Each Side concept developed by Chen when he served as President of the Republic of China. The party chairmanship was reportedly offered to Yu Shyi-kun, who declined the position. The Taiwan Action Party Alliance's founding assembly was held at National Taiwan University Alumni Hall on 18 August 2019. At the founding assembly, Yang Chyi-wen was elected the inaugural party chairman, and took office alongside a 15-member executive council.

== Membership ==
Among TAPA's 152 founding members were a number of medical professionals. Several members in attendance at the party's founding assembly expressed disappointment in the Tsai Ing-wen presidential administration as reason for them to join TAPA. The party charter emphasized Taiwan independence, in contrast to Tsai's status quo Cross-Strait relations policy.

== 2020 elections ==
Taiwan Action Party Alliance officials stated that the party would not nominate a candidate for the 2020 Taiwan presidential election, but would contest the 2020 Taiwan legislative election. TAPA did not win any legislative seats in the 2020 elections.

The party was dissolved on 19 January 2020.
