= Chen Shu-ming =

Taiwanese artist

Chen Shu-ming (Chinese: 陳世明)(1948–) is a Taiwanese artist who makes creations in various media, including sketches, ink wash paintings, oil paintings, mixed media and photography. He was active in the art world in the 1980s in Taiwan, has abundant exhibition experience, and has served as a professor in the Department of Fine Arts at the Taipei National University of the Arts.

== Art studying history ==
Chen Shu-ming was born in Xizhou Township, Changhua County in 1948. He developed an interest in painting at a young age, and learned sketching and watercolor painting from Chen Cheng, a teacher in Siluo Junior High School. From 1967 to 1970, he studied in the Department of Fine Arts, National Taiwan Academy of Arts (now National Taiwan University of Arts), where he learned from senior Taiwanese artists such as Lee Tze-fan, Yang Sanlang, Li Mei-shu, Hong Rui-lin, and Chen Ching-jung.

After graduating from the National Taiwan Academy of Arts, Chen Shu-ming went to Spain to study at the Real Academia de Bellas Artes de San Fernando (Spanish: Real Academia de Bellas Artes de San Fernando) from 1973 to 1976. He was influenced by the legacy of Spanish art, including Lopez (Spanish: Antonio Lopez-Garcia), Tàpies (Catalan: Antoni Tàpies) and Miró (Catalan: Joan Miró i Ferrà).

After graduating, he went on to study at the School of Visual Arts in New York in 1977, and returned to Taiwan in the same year when he devoted himself to Taiwanese art world with continuous creations and art education. From 1984 to 2013, he taught at the Department of Fine Arts, National Institute of the Arts (now Taipei National University of the Arts).

== Art style ==
Chen Shu-ming's early works from 1983 to 2003 can be divided into two main styles. One is pencil sketching, which is characterized by "exquisite sketching", using pencil to depict plants, water and rocks in a precise and delicate style, while the layout presents a sense of silence and elegance, and is ethereal and clean. The other is the abstract geometric series of paintings, in which geometric color blocks are arranged and combined on the canvas with simple and bright hues, and supplemented by collage creation, emphasizing the reconfiguration of space.

Since 2004, he has dedicated himself to the creation of photography, focusing on the transformation and convergence of time and space. Each work is a combination of several photographs superimposed and reconstructed to create a colorful image.

== Selected works ==
Chen Shu-ming 's works are currently in the collections of the National Taiwan Museum of Fine Arts, Taipei Fine Arts Museum and Kaohsiung Museum of Fine Arts respectively, as follows:

National Taiwan Museum of Fine Arts Collection

- "81-02" 1981
- "85-02" 1985
- "Exploration" 1991
- "95-21" 1995

Taipei Fine Arts Museum Collection

- "Walls" 1975
- "Water Stone" 1982
- "Illusions" 1991
- "Karma" 1991
- "Transcending" 1991
- "Between Black and White" 1992

Kaohsiung Museum of Fine Arts Collection

- "94—06" 1994

== Exhibitions ==
=== Solo exhibitions ===
- 1980 Solo exhibition, Apollo Art Gallery, Taipei
- 1984 Solo exhibition, Spring Gallery, Taipei
- 1986 Solo exhibition, Studio Marconi, Milano, Italy
- 1992 Solo exhibition, Eslite Gallery, Taipei
- 1992 Solo exhibition, Up Gallery, Kaohsiung
- 1996 Solo exhibition, Eslite Gallery, Taipei
- 1999 “Free of Thought, Wielding White”, Galerie Pierre, Taichung
- 2000 “The Truth Revealed”, Solo Exhibition at Eslite Gallery, Taipei
- 2003 “Qi in Motion”, New Taipei City Art Center, Taipei
- 2012 “Exploring Visual Language”, Taipei Fine Arts Museum, Taipei

=== Joint exhibitions ===
- 1982-1983 Nominated respectively in XXII Joan Miró International Drawing Prize Competition
- 1985 “Hsiung-Shih Art Biennial Exhibition”, Hsiung-Shih Gallery, Taipei
- 1989 “Series Exhibition of Contemporary Artists”, Eslite Gallery, Taipei
- 1990 “Chinese Contemporary Art – Art Action Worldwide Touring”, Macau City Hall Exhibition Gallery, China
- 1993 “New Look of Art in Taiwan”, Taipei Fine Art Museum, Taipei
- 1993 “Messages from Taiwan: The Contemporary Art of the Republic of China”, Museum of Art (Now National Taiwan Museum of Fine Arts), Taichung
- 1994 “Taipei Modern Art”, Bangkok National Gallery, Thailand
- 1996 “Power of Line: The 2nd Domestic and International Modern Drawing Exhibition”, Duchamp Art, Kaohsiung
- 1996 “New Drawing Exhibition”, New Taipei Art Association, Taipei
- 1998 “The Multi-dimensional Generation - Modern Art in Taiwan”, Paris Cultural Center, France, Taipei Fine Arts Museum, Taipei
- 1998 “Power of Line: The Contemporary International Drawing Exhibition”, Taipei Gallery, New York, U.S.A.
- 1999 “Masterpiece of Ideas - Joint Exhibition of Seven”, Lung Men Art Gallery, Taipei
- 1999 “Works on Paper Invitational Exhibition”, Taipei National University of the Arts, Taipei
- 1999 “Taiwan Contemporary Art Exhibition”, Zaragoza City Hall, Spain
- 1999 Joint Exhibition at Musée du quai Branly, France
- 1999 “Visions of Pluralism: Contemporary Art in Taiwan”, National Art Museum of China, Beijing
- 1999 “The Inextinguishable Vigor of Life”, Fubon Art Foundation, Taipei
- 1999 “The Unpredictable Changes in the Subtropical Zone”, New Confucian Art Gallery, Taichung
- 1999 “Point and Line to Plane Art Exhibition”, Chiayi City Cultural Center, Chiayi
- 1999 “Yongkang Street Arts Festival”, Top Scene, Taipei
- 1999 “Magnetic Writing - Within One Thought”, ITPARK, Taipei
- 2000 “Capturing Phenomena and Imagination: Exhibition of Contemporary Drawing”, Eslite Gallery, Taipei
- 2004 “The Lyricism of Form Geometric Abstraction”, Taipei Fine Arts Museum, Taipei
- 2005 “Figurative Painting in Taiwan Exhibition”, Taipei Fine Arts Museum, Taipei
- 2005 “Kuandu Extravaganza - Exhibition of Modern Art in Taiwan”, Taipei
- National University of the Arts, Kuandu Museum of Fine Arts 2022“Rustic Truth-Exhibition of Lai Chi Man & Chen Shu-ming”, Remarkable
- Cultivation Art Museum, Tainan
