= Jiufen Old Street =

Tourist attraction in New Taipei, Taiwan

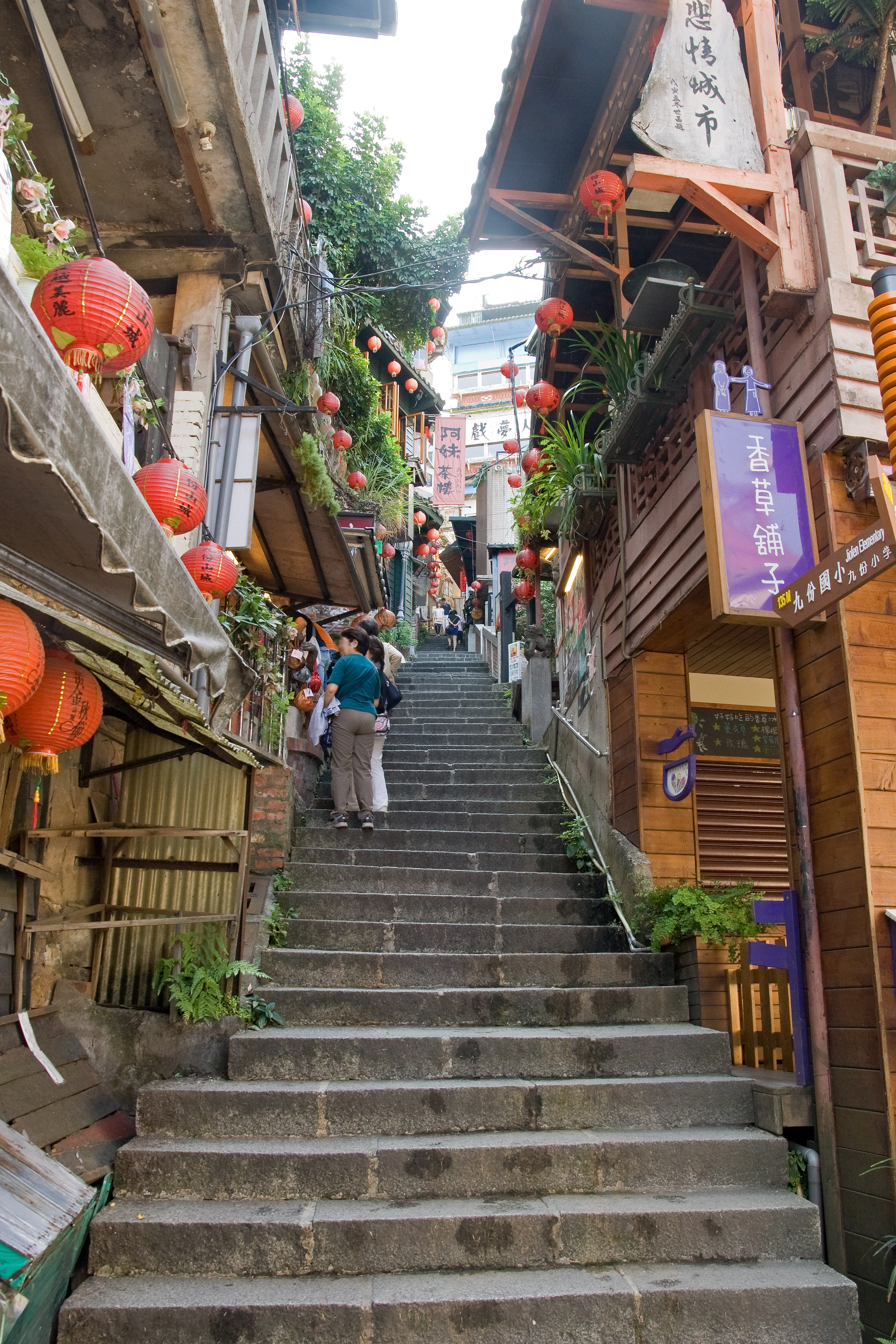
- Staircase in 2011

- Location within Taiwan
- Interactive map of Jiufen Old Street
- Native name: 九份老街 (Min Nan Chinese)
- Type: Alley
- Length: 970 m (3,180 ft)
- Coordinates: 25.1088°N 121.8435°E

Other
- Known for: Night market

Jiufen Old Street is a series of alleyways and a night market in Jiufen, Ruifang District, New Taipei, Taiwan. National Geographic has called Old Street "one of the country's most iconic night markets".

Fried fish, noodle soups, peanut ice cream rolls, pork dumplings, sweet potato and taro balls, and Taiwanese sausages are among the many food options available to visitors at Jiufen Old Street. Stores that line the street also sell crafts and souvenirs. There is also a Ghost Mask Museum.

Jiufen Old Street is sometimes said to be an inspiration for Spirited Away, although this was denied by Hayao Miyazaki.

== See also ==
- List of night markets in Taiwan
- List of tourist attractions in Taiwan
- Night markets in Taiwan
