= Britons in China =

There are estimates of around 20,000 to 40,000 British Nationals/expats living in Mainland China(PRC, Excluding Hong Kong). A submission from the UK parliament citing China's Ministry of Public Security put the figure at about 20,000 British nationals in mainland China.

They are primarily expatriates in business, education, or other professional roles in major cities; due to COVID policies, economic factors, and geopolitics, the numbers had fluctuated.

== History ==
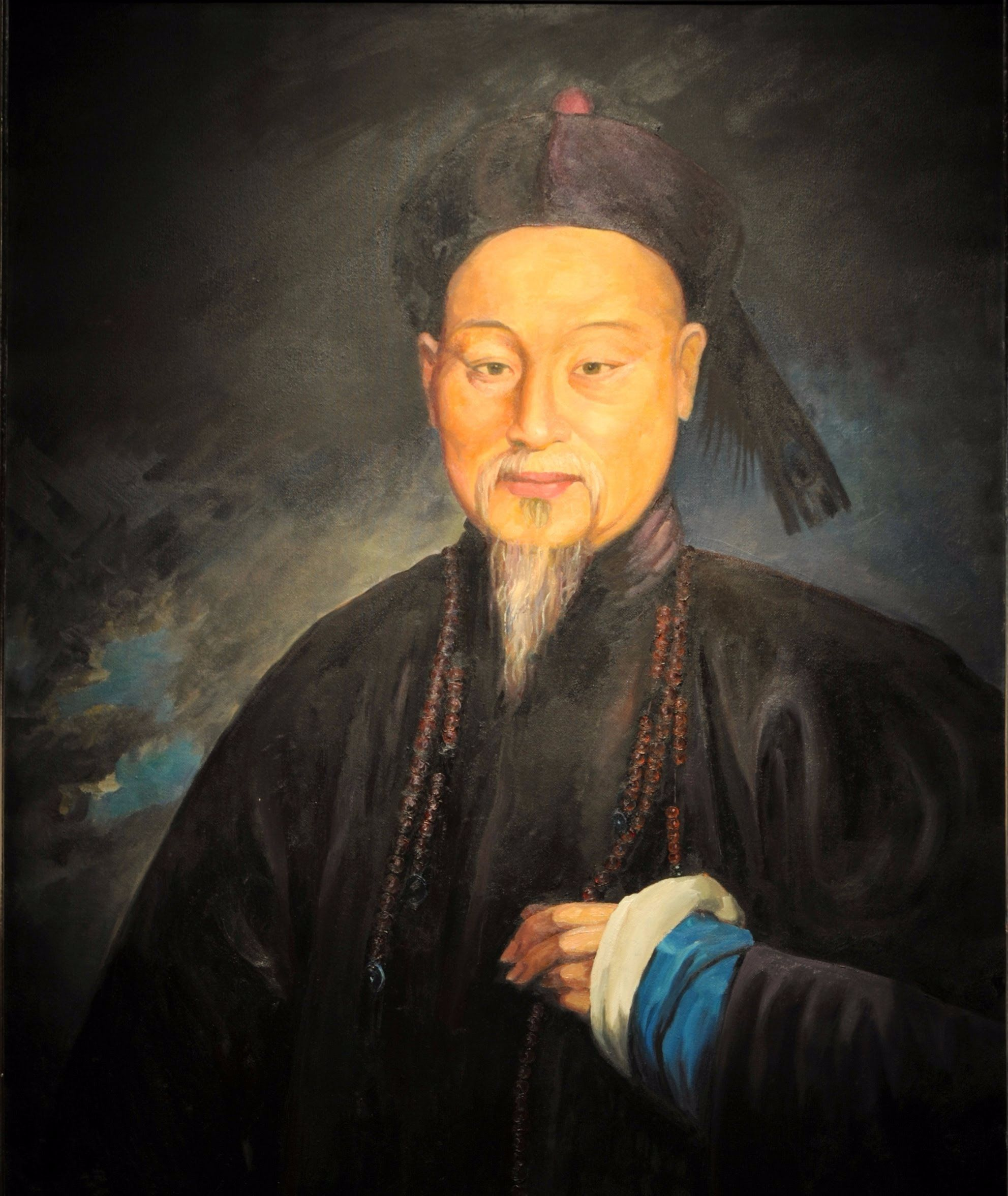
Portrait of Commissioner Lin Zexu

British involvement in China began in the 18th century primarily through the British East India Company (EIC), which sought Chinese goods like tea, silk, porcelain, and other luxurious items. British demand for tea made a massive trade imbalance, as China showed little interest in British manufactured goods. To offset this, British merchants (often via the EIC) increasingly turned to smuggling opium from India into China, which became highly profitable but became increasingly socially destructive in China.

Tensions escalated when Chinese officials, notably Commissioner Lin Zexu, confiscated and destroyed British opium stocks in 1839 (Destruction of opium at Humen). This triggered the First Opium War (1839–1842).

=== Treaty Port Era (Mid-19th to Early 20th Century) ===
Britain's victory led to the Treaty of Nanking (1842), one of the first "unequal treaties." The outcomes included:

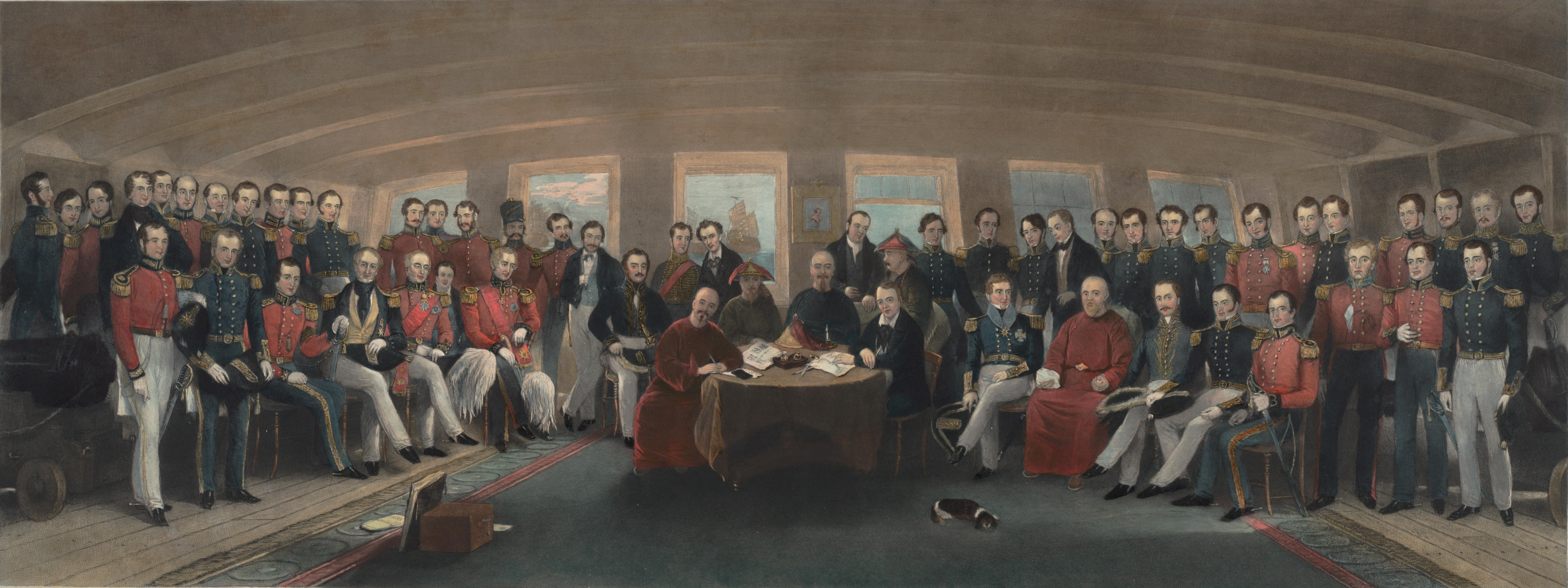
The Signing of Treaty Of Nanking 1842

- Cession of Hong Kong Island to Britain in perpetuity as a Crown Colony.
- Opening of five treaty ports to British trade and residence: Guangzhou (Canton), Xiamen (Amoy), Fuzhou, Ningbo, and Shanghai.
- Extraterritorial rights for British subjects (they were subject to British law, not Chinese law).
- Payment of indemnities to Britain.

=== The Second Opium War (1856–1860) ===
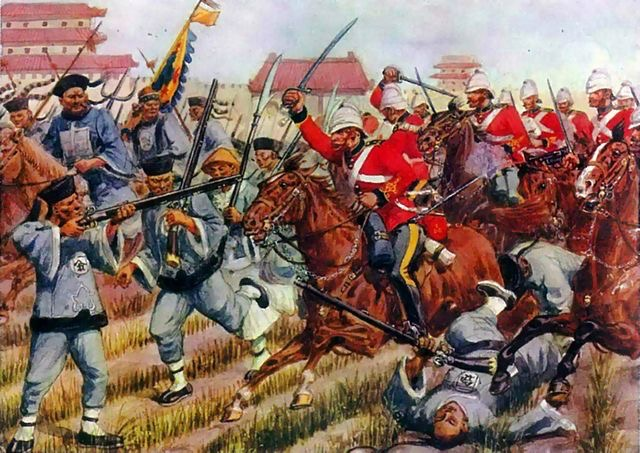

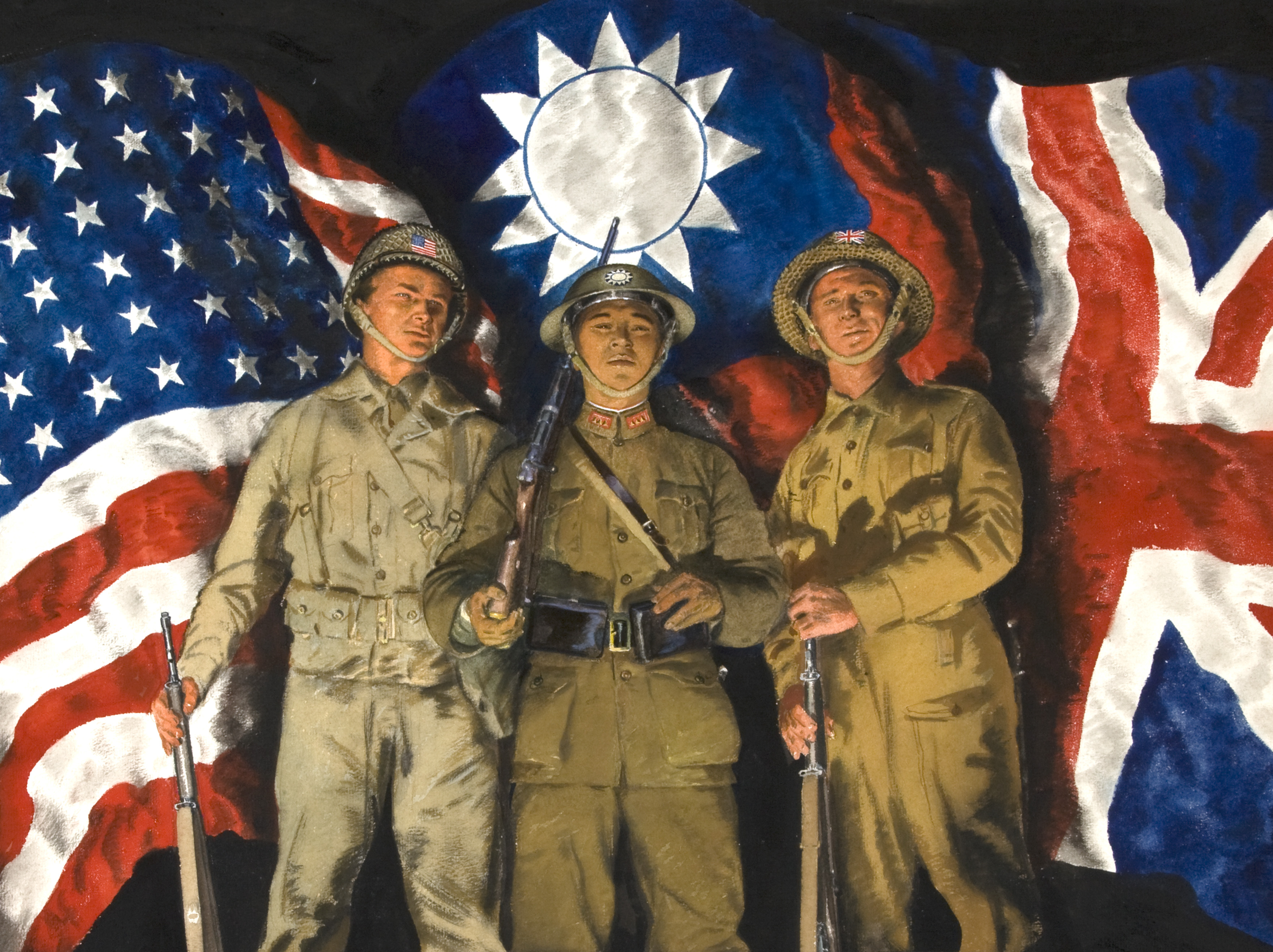

Involving Britain and France, resulted in more treaties (for example, Treaty of Tianjin) that opened additional ports, legalized the opium trade, and foreign privileges, Over time, more than 80 treaty ports and foreign concessions emerged across China, with a lot of British presence in places like Shanghai (where the International Settlement merged British and American areas in 1863).

In the settlements, Britons (and many other foreigners) enjoyed self governing enclaves with their own police, courts, and amenities, Shanghai became the largest foreign community hub. At its peak in the 1920s–1930s, an estimated 15,000 to 20,000 Britons lived and worked in mainland China (excluding Hong Kong), with roughly half in Shanghai.

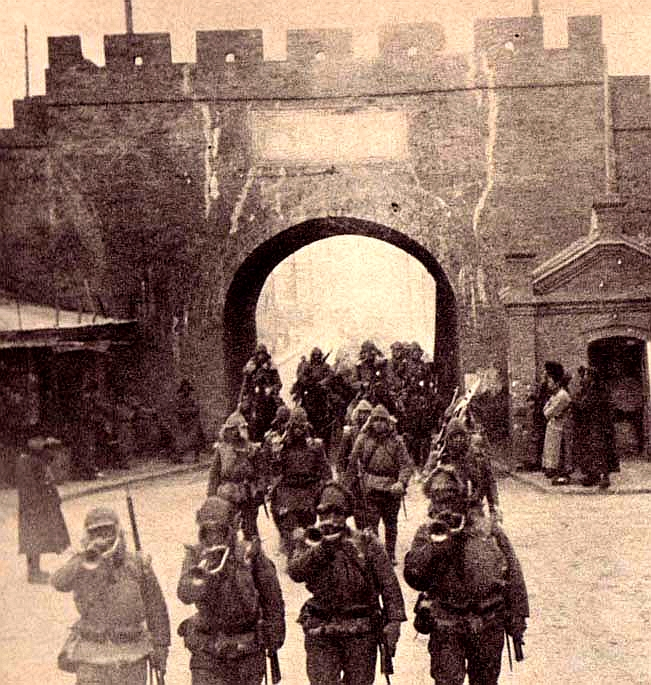
Japanese troops entering Qiqihar

=== DECLINE: WWII, Japanese Invasion, and the Chinese Civil War (1927–1949) ===
The British presence peaked in the late 19th to early 20th century but had a sharp decline starting with the Japanese invasion of China in 1937 (Second Sino-Japanese War). Many foreigners including Britons evacuated or faced restrictions. Following the attack on Pearl Harbor (1941), Japanese forces occupied the International Settlement in Shanghai and other areas, interning many British and Allied civilians.

After Japan's defeat in 1945, the Chinese Civil War resumed. The 1949 Communist victory and founding of the People's Republic of China led to the end of most foreign concessions. The extraterritorial rights were formally removed earlier (Example: 1943 treaties), but the new government largely expelled or caused the departure of remaining Westerners through nationalization and political changes.

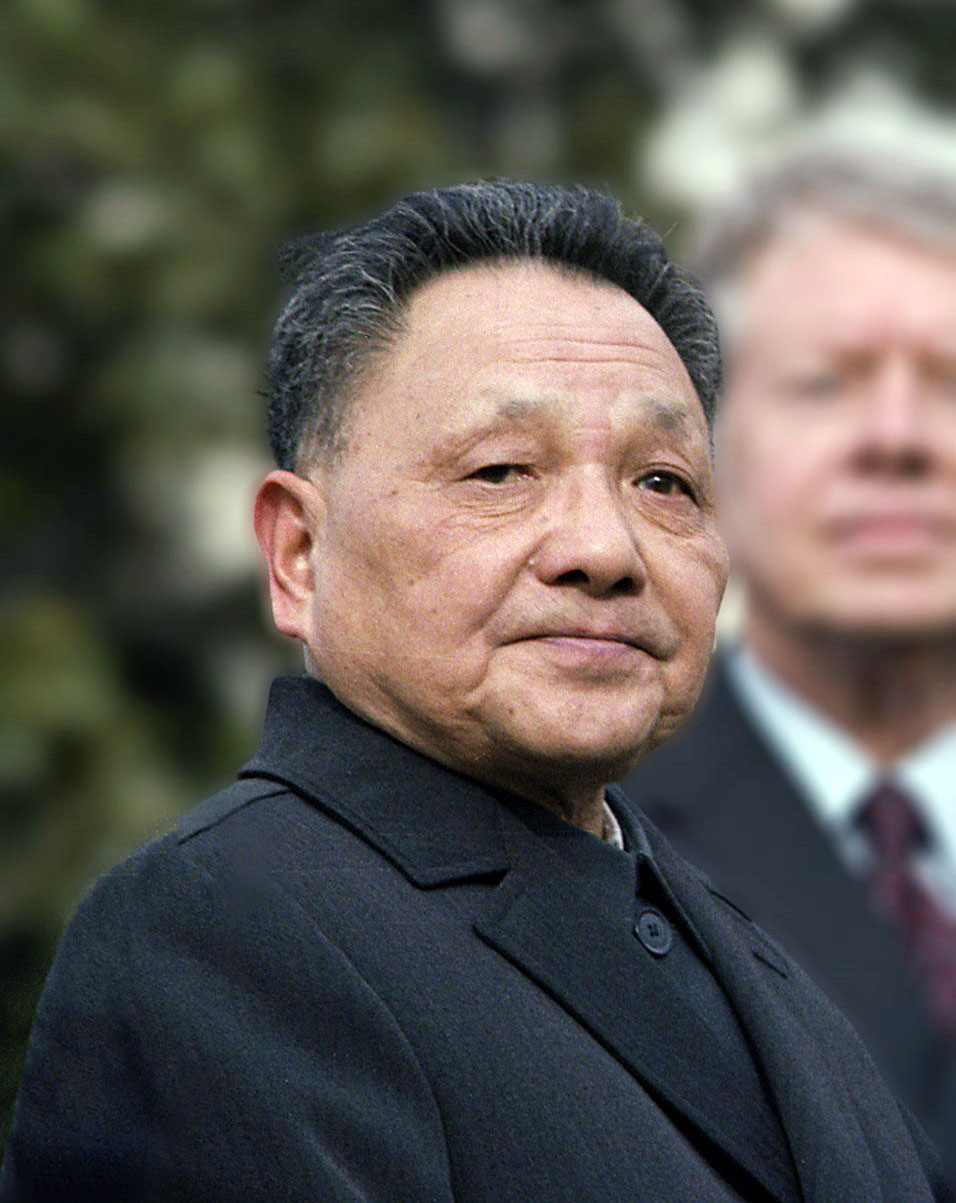
Deng Xiaoping

=== Post-1978 Reform and Opening-Up Era ===
Deng Xiaoping's economic reforms begins in 1978. China gradually reopened to foreign investment and expertise. A new wave of British (and other Western) professionals, teachers, businesspeople, and diplomats arrived, concentrating in cities like Shanghai, Beijing, Guangzhou, and later Shenzhen.

The British community was relatively small and largely transient (on work or residence visas) compared to historical peaks in the treaty port era, growth accelerated in the 1990s and 2000s as UK-China trade and investment expanded, supported by British diplomatic presence and business networks. By the mid-2000s, estimates placed the number of Britons in mainland China (excluding Hong Kong) in the low tens of thousands.

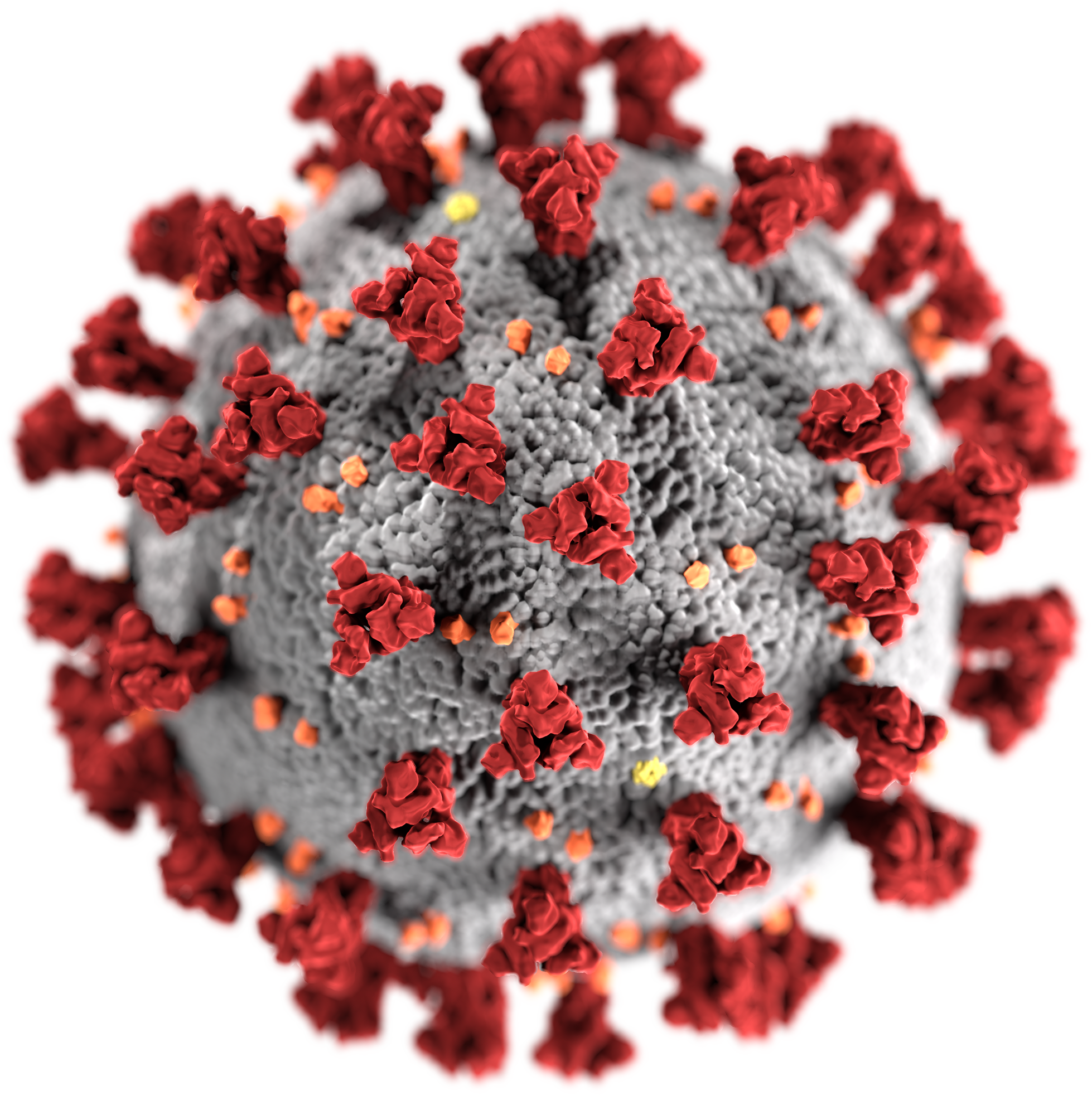

Recent official figures, citing China's Ministry of Public Security, indicate around 20,000 British nationals living in mainland China, The numbers however fluctuated due to economic shifts, strict visa and residency policies, the impact of COVID-19 restrictions (2020–2022, which made many departures), and evolving UK-China geopolitical relations.

== Education ==
British international schools in Mainland China include:

Beijing:

- British School of Beijing, Sanlitun
- British School of Beijing, Shunyi
- Dulwich College Beijing
- Harrow International School Beijing
- Pennon Foreign Language School, Beijing
- International School of Beijing (Formed by a merger of the British Embassy School)
- Beijing Rego British School (closed)

Guangdong:

- British School of Guangzhou
- Bromsgrove School Mission Hills (Shenzhen)
- Dulwich International High School Zhuhai

Jiangsu:

- Wycombe Abbey International School of Changzhou (former Oxford International College of Changzhou)
- British School of Nanjing
- Dulwich College Suzhou
- Dulwich International High School Suzhou

Shandong:

- Malvern College Qingdao

Shanghai:

- Nord Anglia International School Shanghai Pudong
- The British International School Shanghai, Puxi Campus
- Dulwich College Shanghai
- Harrow International School Shanghai
- Wellington College International Shanghai
- Shanghai Rego International School (Closed)

Sichuan:

- Malvern College Chengdu
- Oxford International College of Chengdu

Tianjin:

- Wellington College International Tianjin

British schools in Hong Kong include:

- Harrow International School Hong Kong
- Kellett School
- Malvern College Hong Kong
- South Island School

== Notable personalities ==
- Charles Gordon
- Rutherford Alcock
- Sir Robert Hart
- Lord Elgin
- Sir Henry Pottinger
- James Matheson
- William Jardine
- Sir Edmund Backhouse, 2nd Baronet
- Lee and Oli Barrett - social media personalities
- John Otway Percy Bland

== See also ==
- British diaspora
- British Chinese
- China-United Kingdom relations
- British Hong Kong – British colony in the Far East from 1841 to 1997
