= Lee Barrett =

Lee Barrett may refer to:

- Lee Barrett, founder of Candlelight Records
- Lee Barrett, character in The Satan Bug
- Lee and Oli Barrett, YouTubers in China
- Lee Barratt, drummer of English hardcore punk band Gallows (band)
