= Afu Thomas =

German entrepreneur

"Afu" Thomas
- 阿福
- Born: Thomas Derksen; 26 October 1988 (age 37); Gummersbach, West Germany
- Other name: De Fulong
- Citizenship: Germany
- Education: Engelbert-von-Berg-Gymnasium Wipperfürth; Ruhr University Bochum
- Years active: 2016–present
- Spouse: Zhu Liping (朱莉萍) (m. 2013; div. 2024)

Bilibili information
- Channel: 阿福Thomas
- Years active: 2016–present
- Followers: 1,835,447

Chinese name: De Fulong
- Simplified Chinese: 德福龙
- Traditional Chinese: 德福龍
Transcriptions
Standard Mandarin
- Hanyu Pinyin: Dé Fúlóng

Nickname: Afu
- Chinese: 阿福
Transcriptions
Standard Mandarin
- Hanyu Pinyin: Āfú
- Last updated: 2 March 2026

Thomas Derksen (born 26 October 1988), known as "Afu" Thomas (Chinese: 阿福Thomas), is a German internet celebrity active in China.

== Biography ==
Afu was born as Thomas Derksen, on 26 October 1988, into a Aussiedler family in Gummersbach, West Germany, which later moved to Marienheide where Afu was raised. He is the youngest of six children of Maria, a chef, and Peter Derksen, an engineer, preceded by three brothers and two sisters. He is of Volga German descent, his ancestors emigrated to Russia with Catherine the Great and established "Petersdorf", which literally means "Peter Town". His family returned to Germany from the Soviet Union in 1987, and Afu is the only child of his parents who was born in Germany.

As a student at Engelbert-von-Berg-Gymnasium Wipperfürth, he took Chinese for two years there and did a student exchange trip to China in 2007, his first time in the country. After briefly working in banking at Kreissparkasse Köln he studied at Ruhr University Bochum, taking courses about business and Chinese. From 2013 to 2014, he attended Fudan University, and has lived in Shanghai since 2016. He is fluent in Mandarin and has been learning the Shanghainese dialect.

His videos depict his experiences in Shanghai. His wife and two employees help Derksen manage his social media profiles, including Bilibili, Meipai, Tencent QQ, and Sina Weibo. He has expressed an interest in the Chinese e-commerce model, writing a letter in 2017 to German Chancellor Angela Merkel on how Germany could follow China in its cashless payment system. In June 2019, he was reported to have 15 million fans in the country.

In February 2020, he uploaded a video interview with German virologist Rolf Hilgenfeld who was in China at the time to assist with the COVID-19 situation; the video garnered more than 3.2 million views on Bilibili. He later followed with a video (where he spoke English instead of Chinese or German) titled "Fight the Virus not China".

=== Legal dispute with Christoph Rehage ===
In February 2023 Derksen took fellow German China-YouTuber Christoph Rehage (The Longest Way) to court after Rehage had published a reaction video covering the satirical Golden Toady of the CCP Award (Chinese: 奶共金奶奖) presented by Chinese human rights activist Yutong Su to Derksen for his alleged propaganda work in favor of the Chinese Communist Party, Derksen claiming in his complaint to court that his right to privacy had thus been violated, demanding from Rehage a payment of 10,000 euros in compensation and the permanent deletion of related publications from the internet. On February 13, 2023, the Frankfurt am Main District Court ruled in favor of Rehage and dismissed the case, declaring in its opinion that it was well within Rehage's freedom of speech to publicly express his views on the matter and ordered Derksen to cover all costs related to the trial.

== Books ==
- Und täglich grüßt der Tigervater: Als deutscher Schwiegersohn in China, 2018, ISBN 978-3-641-23907-7
- Kartoffelbrei mit Stäbchen: drei Chinesen, fünf Länder, sieben Tage – mit meiner chinesischen Familie auf Hochzeitsreise in Europa, 2021, ISBN 978-3-453-60573-2

== See also ==
- Lee and Oli Barrett – British social media figures in China
- Dashan – Canadian television personality in China
- Raz Gal-Or – Israeli social media figure in China
- David Gulasi – Australian internet celebrity active in China
- Amy Lyons – Australian internet celebrity active in China
- Winston Sterzel – South African social media figure in China
- Propaganda in China
