= Chinatown, Sydney =

Coordinates: 33°52′43.61″S 151°12′14.69″E

Chinatown 唐人街 (Chinese)
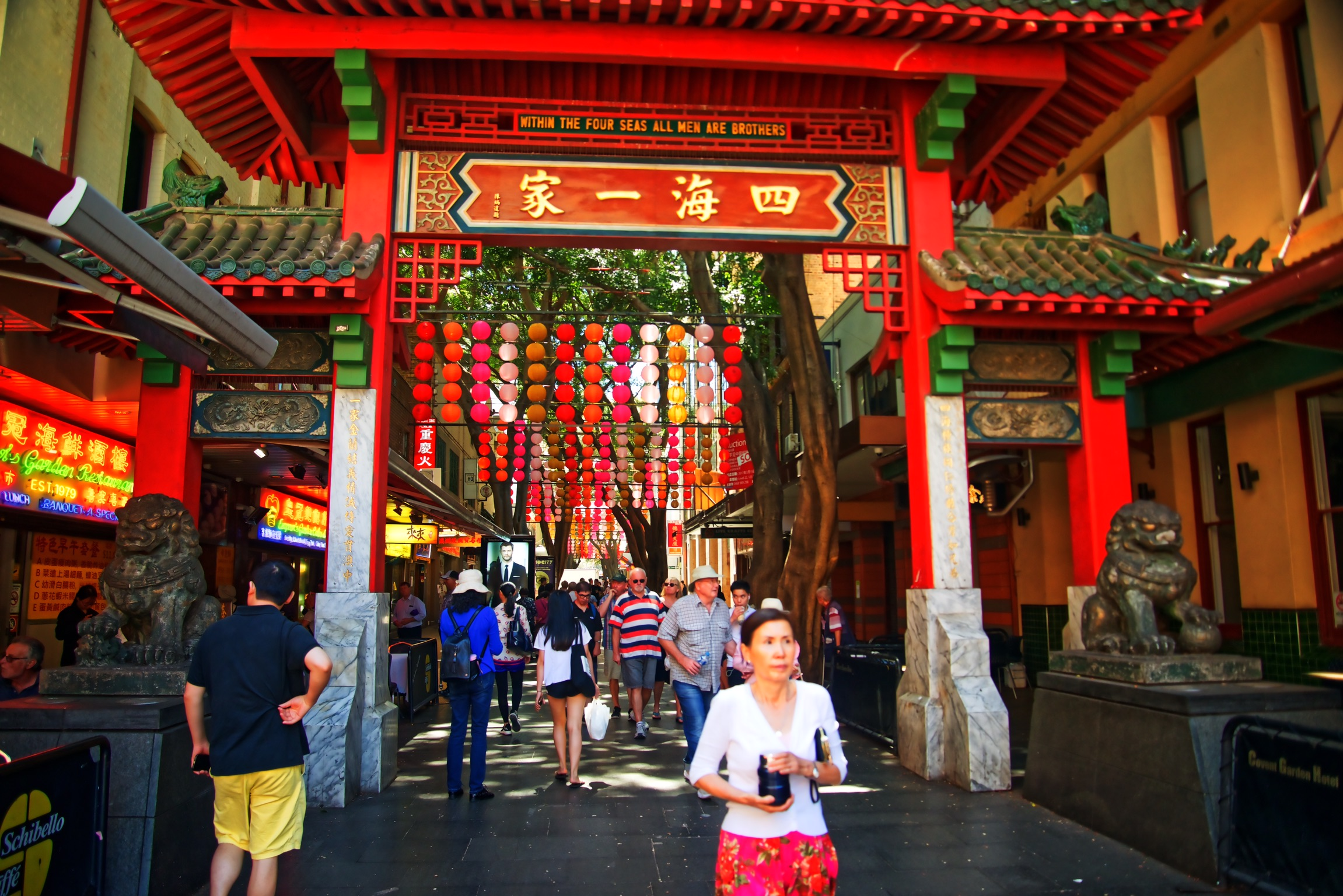
- A Chinese paifang at the intersection of Factory Street and Dixon Street
- Interactive map of Chinatown
- Country: Australia
- State: New South Wales
- City: Sydney
- LGA: City of Sydney

Government
  - State electorate: Sydney
  - Federal division: Sydney

Area
  - Total: 0.5 km^{2} (0.19 sq mi)

Population
  - Total: 22,218 (2018)
  - Density: 44,000/km^{2} (115,000/sq mi)
- Postcode: 2000
Localities around Chinatown
Ultimo	Sydney CBD	Sydney CBD
Ultimo	Chinatown	Sydney CBD
Haymarket	Haymarket	Haymarket

Sydney Chinatown
- Chinese: 悉尼唐人街
Transcriptions
Standard Mandarin
- Hanyu Pinyin: Xīní Tángrénjiē
Yue: Cantonese
- Yale Romanization: Sīknèih Tòhngyàhn'gāai
- Jyutping: Sik1nei4 Tong4jan4gaai1

Alternative Chinese name
- Traditional Chinese: 雪梨華埠
- Simplified Chinese: 雪梨华埠
Transcriptions
Standard Mandarin
- Hanyu Pinyin: Xuělí Huábù
Yue: Cantonese
- Yale Romanization: Syutlèih Wàhbouh
- Jyutping: Syut3lei4 Waa4bou6

Chinatown (Chinese: 悉尼唐人街; Cantonese Yale: Sīknèih Tòhngyàhn'gāai; pinyin: Xīní Tángrénjiē) is an urban enclave situated in the southern part of the Sydney central business district, in New South Wales, Australia. It comprises the majority of the Haymarket suburb, between Central station and Darling Harbour. It is part of the local government area of the City of Sydney, and is Australia's largest Chinatown.

Sydney, and the colony of New South Wales, experienced Chinese migration as early as 1828. The first group of Chinese labourers from Amoy (modern day Xiamen) embarked for New South Wales in 1848. With the discovery of gold in 1851 Chinese immigration increased, and by 1855 the number of Chinese immigrants reached around 17,000. The Chinese population had traditionally been represented by those who came from Southern China (i.e. provinces such as Guangdong and Fujian), due to the majority of colonial ports being located in the southern coast of China.

== History ==
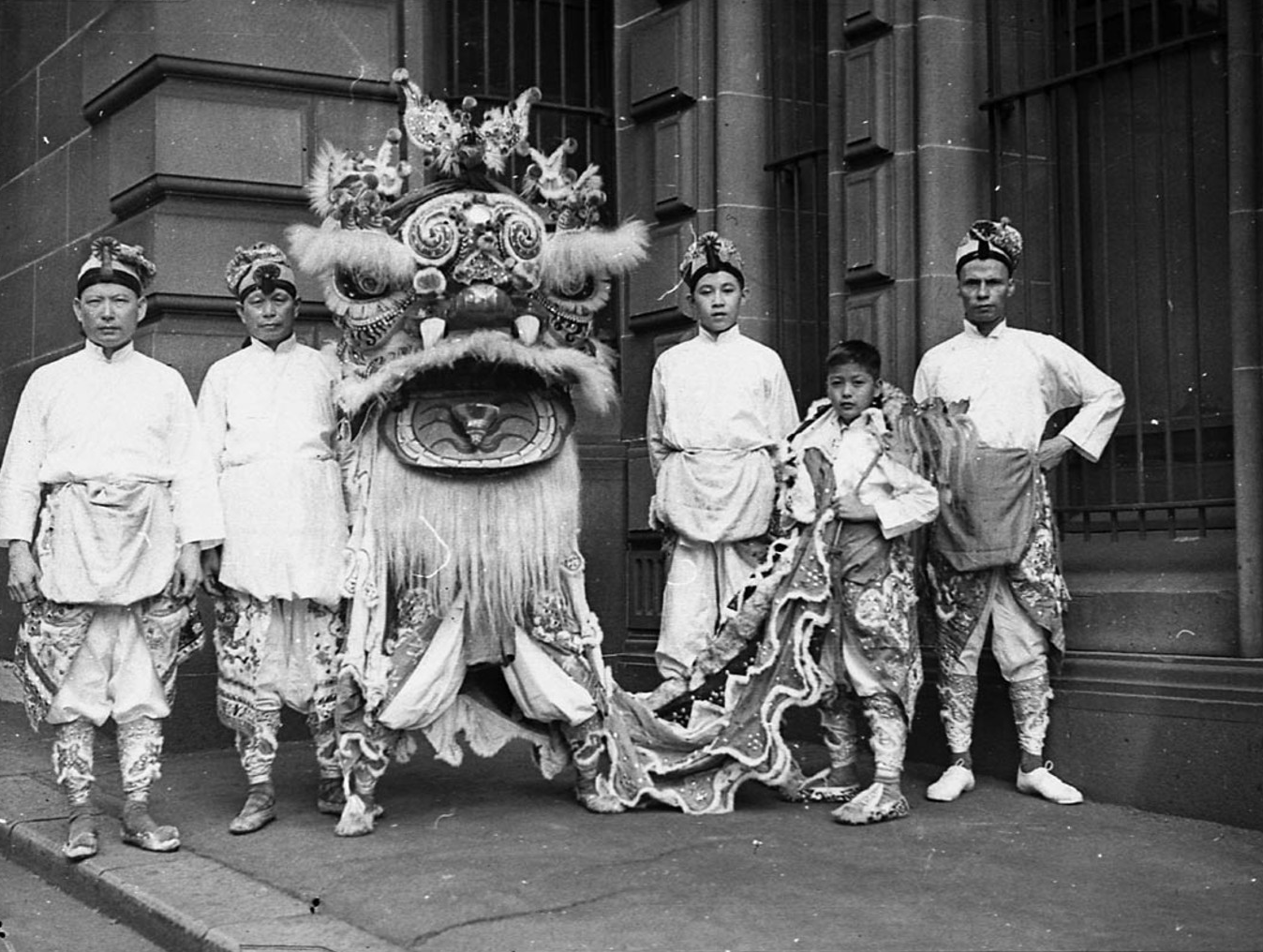
Chinese immigrants in Sydney at the Pageant of Nations, Sydney Town Hall, 1938.

One of the many nationalities to arrive in Australia during the Gold Rush years of the 1850s were the Chinese, and large groups stayed on after the Gold Rush itself ended. They settled largely in their own communities, working in locations across Sydney, with many of these Chinese immigrants becoming market gardeners on the city's fringe. By 1861 there were some 13,000 Chinese living in New South Wales, and during this time the Chinatown was in The Rocks district, also known as the 'Chinese Quarter'. Anti-immigration sentiment was rife during the 1880s, and a Royal Commission into "Alleged Chinese Gambling and Immorality" began in 1892, due to the number of opium dens and brothels that were found in the area, similar to Melbourne's Chinatown. This attitude of negativity towards the Chinese had settled down by the time of Federation in 1901. By the 1920s, Sydney's Chinatown migrated over to Campbell Street, in the vicinity of the popular Capitol Theatre.

Since 2019, Dixon Street and other intersecting streets are completely vehicle-free every Friday from 4pm, in order to host the Friday night markets. Different stalls selling Asian street food, desserts, and confectionery line the streets and alleyways, and the markets can become extremely busy.

== Location ==
=== Traditional boundaries ===
Officially, Chinatown does not have clearly defined borders, due to its continuous growth. The traditional core of the Haymarket Chinatown has been centred around Dixon Street, a pedestrian street mall with many Chinese restaurants, and with a paifang (a traditional Chinese gateway) at each end. At the eastern side, running parallel with Dixon Street, are Sussex Street and George Street, Sydney city's main thoroughfare. Other streets and lanes within Sydney's Chinatown include Factory Street, Goulburn Street, Little Hay Street, Kimber Lane and Thomas Street.

At the eastern end of Chinatown, at the corner of George Street and Hay Street, there is a sculpture made from a dead tree trunk; created by artist Lin Li in 1999 and named Golden Water Mouth. Its designer believed that it would bring good fortune to the Chinese community.

=== Recent expansion ===
The current location of modern day Chinatown is actually the third known area to have been considered a Chinatown. When Sydney's produce market moved from what became the site of the Queen Victoria Building to the Belmore Markets, the Haymarket and Surry Hills areas became the focus for Sydney's Chinese citizens. By the 1920s Chinatown began to consolidate at its current location.

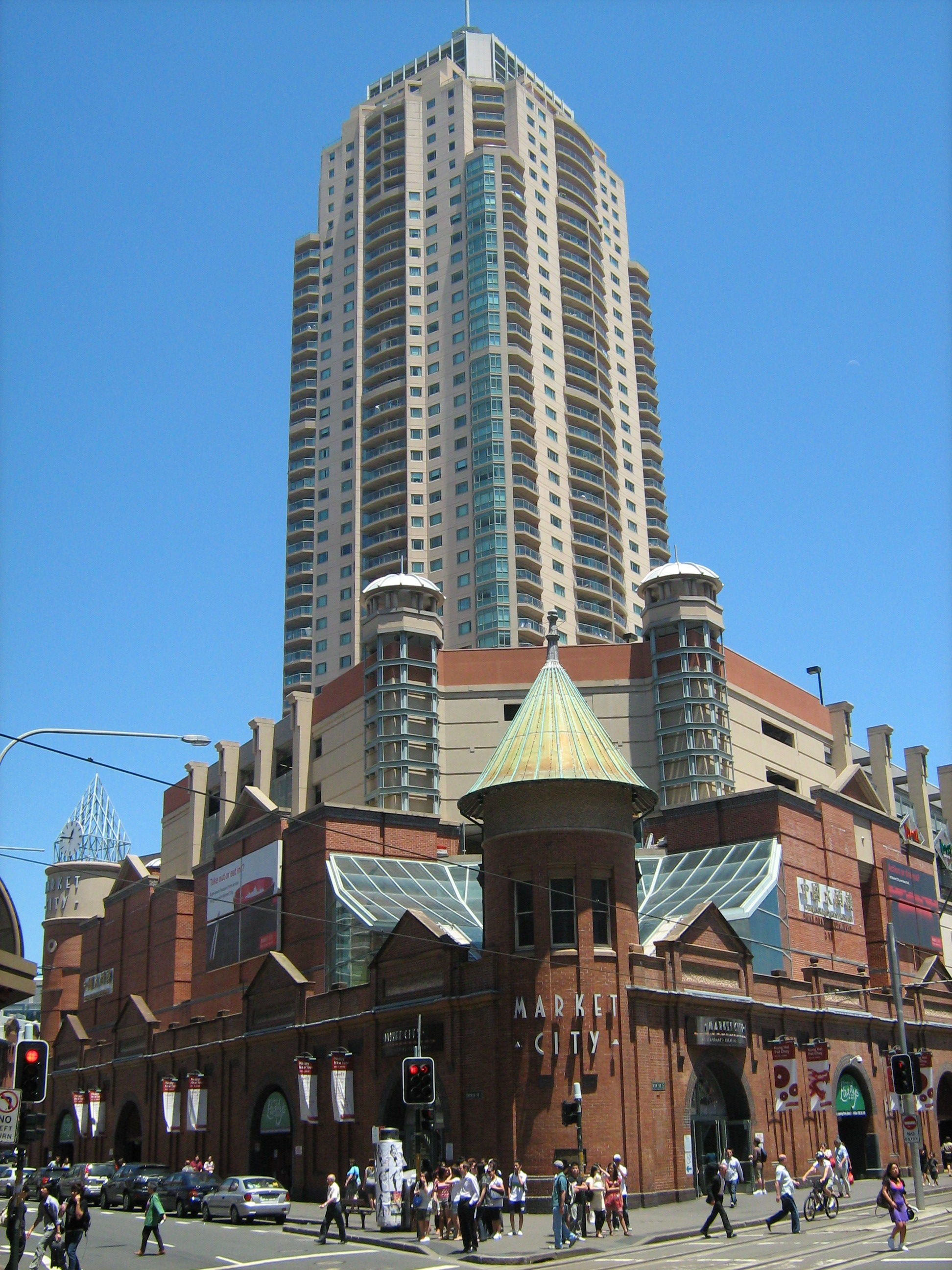
The Peak Apartments building on top of the Market City shopping centre, 2009

On Hay Street, the construction of The Peak Apartments, a residential skyscraper, in 1996 and the newly renovated Market City shopping complex built over the Paddy's Market further consolidated Chinatown. Market City contains food courts with chain restaurants (such as Haidilao), an 800+ seat Dim Sum Restaurant (The Eight Modern Chinese Restaurant), boutique shops, City Amusements (a large indoor entertainment complex), and the Haymarket Paddy's Markets, a Wednesday-to-Sunday produce and flea market. Likewise, the completion of Darling Square in late 2017 adjacent to Market City added multiple new apartment complexes and a plethora of new facilities and restaurants that fully integrated Chinatown into the urban core of Sydney.

Unlike the Chinatowns in some other countries, Sydney's Chinatown has been relatively free of crime and hygiene issues. However, since there are many skyscrapers in Sydney, there are some concerns within the Chinese community about the building height restrictions imposed by the image-conscious local government authorities.

=== Suburbification ===
There are also satellite Chinatowns that have emerged in the past two decades in several Sydney suburbs such as Ashfield, Hurstville, Eastwood, Campsie, Parramatta, Chatswood, Burwood, Flemington and Kingsford. Each of these suburbs are increasingly diverse in that people from specific regions in China settle together in one suburb, traditionally known as an ethnic enclave. For example, Ashfield is known as 'little Shanghai' whilst Hurstville has a high concentration of people from Hong Kong. However, Sydney's Chinatown still remains both a social and cultural centre for the Chinese Australian community in Sydney as it continues to expand.

== Demographics ==
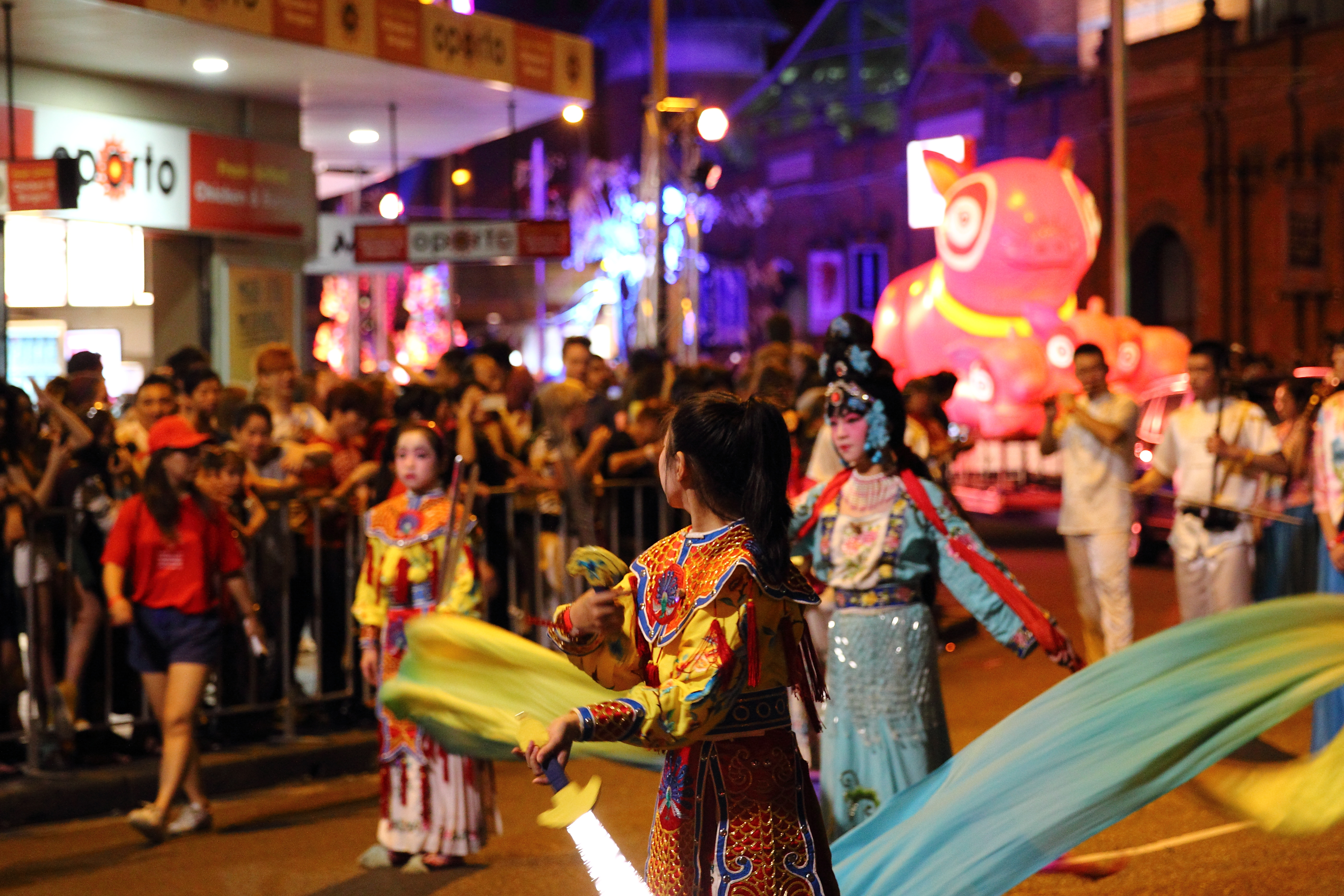
Chinese New Year parade, 2014

According to the Australian Bureau of Statistics, in 2016 the Chinatown and Haymarket area included a significant population of Chinese (31.9%), Thai (18.3%), Indonesian (5.6%), English (5.1%) and Korean (4.8%) population. The most spoken languages at home apart from English were Thai (20.4%), Mandarin (20.3%), Indonesian (10.2%), Cantonese (5.1%), and Korean (4.8%). Furthermore, there is a significant student population from Asia, due to the close proximity of educational institutions such as the University of Technology Sydney, Technical and Further Education (TAFE NSW), and the University of Sydney. As of 2016, 25.9% of the residents in Chinatown were studying at university or TAFE and 33.4% of individuals in the Haymarket area had a attained a bachelor's degree or above.

As a centrally located Chinatown (that is adjacent to, and being gradually absorbed by the growing central business district), there are many white collar workers. Out of the 65,950 workers in the surrounding area in 2017, 18% worked in finance & financial services, 17% in the government, and 13.6% in professional & business services. The median weekly household income in 2016 was $1,696, slightly above the national average of $1,659 in 2019.

== Chinese Garden of Friendship ==
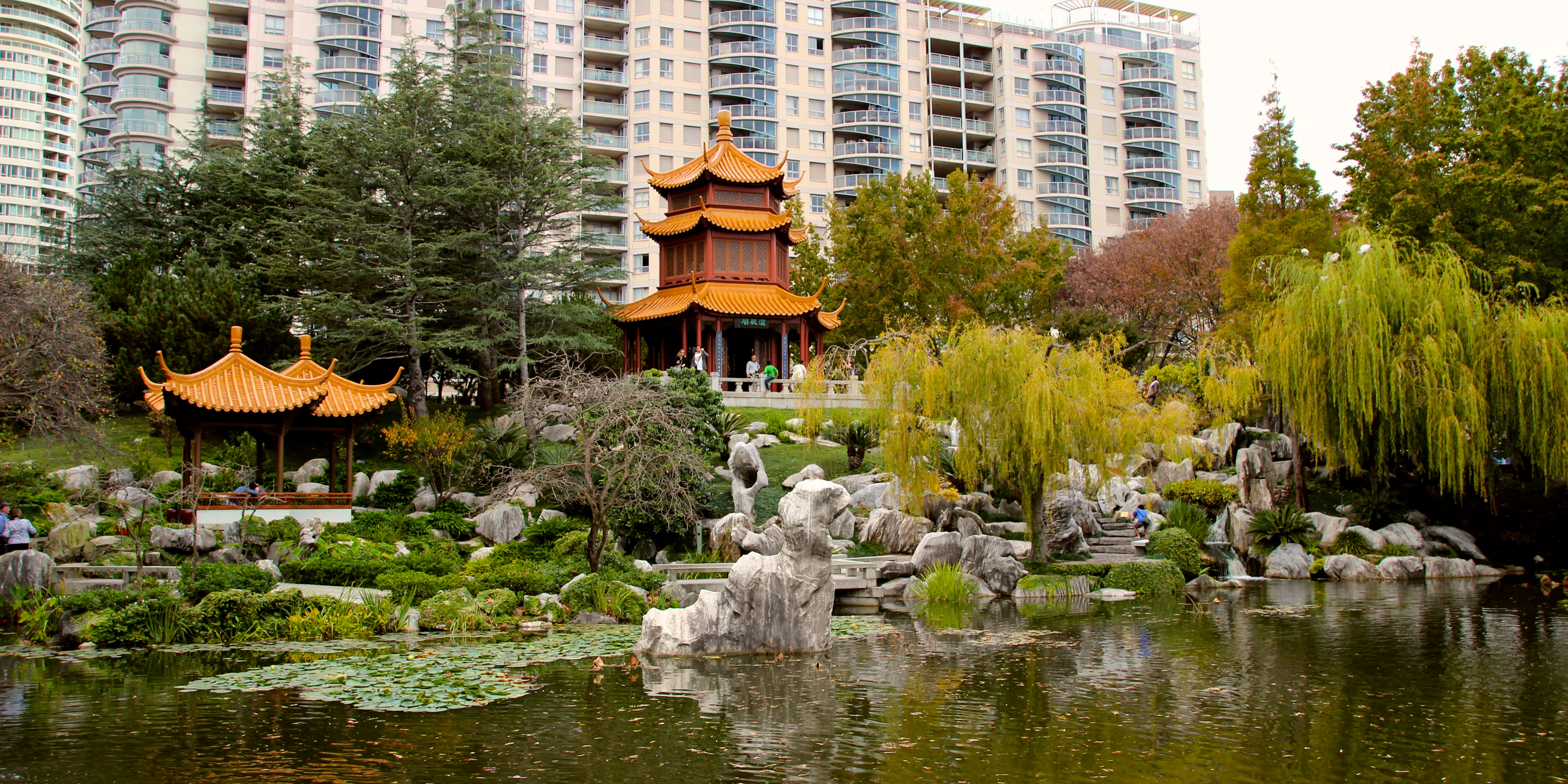
Chinese Garden of Friendship, 2014

Sydney is the sister city of Guangzhou in China, and as a gift to Sydney during the Australian Bicentenary in 1988, the Chinese Garden of Friendship (traditional Chinese: 誼園; simplified Chinese: 谊园; pinyin: yìyuán; Cantonese Yale: yihyùhn) was constructed west of Chinatown in the Darling Harbour precinct. The relationship between Sydney and Guangzhou (previously romanized as Canton), the capital of Guangdong province, is particularly strong because of trade and migration since the earliest days of colonisation. The agreement stipulated Guangdong would provide the design of the garden and key building materials, furniture and artworks that are intrinsic to the classic garden typology, while New South Wales would manage and fund its construction through the Darling Harbour Authority. It is one of the few public traditional Chinese gardens outside of China and is a horticultural expression of a private garden and can also be classified as a scholar's or classical garden. The gardens were added to the New South Wales State Heritage Register on 5 October 2018. The garden hosts activities such as lessons on its history and design philosophy, landscape tours, school visits, wedding functions, koi fish feeding, among others.

== Bilingual street signs ==
There are many bilingual street signs across Chinatown, denoting the name of streets, lanes, and roads in both English and Chinese. Some of the names are based on their Cantonese pronunciation (e.g. Hay Street; 禧街 which is pronounced "Hēi Gāai" in Cantonese, but "Xǐ Jiē" in Mandarin") whilst others are based on their Mandarin pronunciation (e.g. Liverpool Street; 利物浦街 which is pronounced "Lìwùpǔ Jiē" in Mandarin, but "Léihmáhtpóu Gāai" in Cantonese).

Some of these signs are accompanied by their official City of Sydney street signs. On the bottom of each of these signs, it reads, "Welcome to Chinatown" and "歡迎光臨華埠".

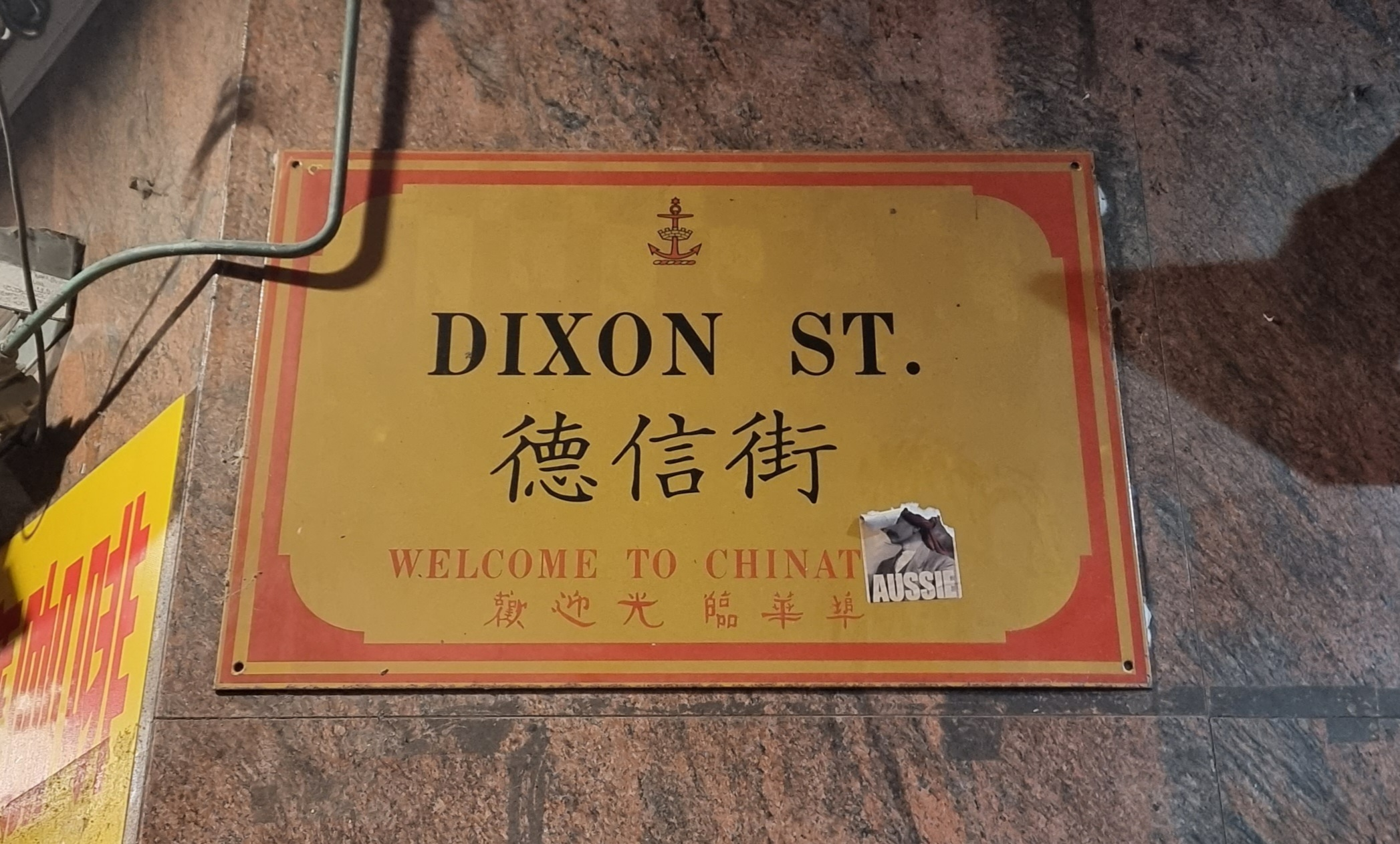
Dixon Street; 德信街 (Cantonese: Dakseun Gāai; Mandarin: Déxìn Jiē)

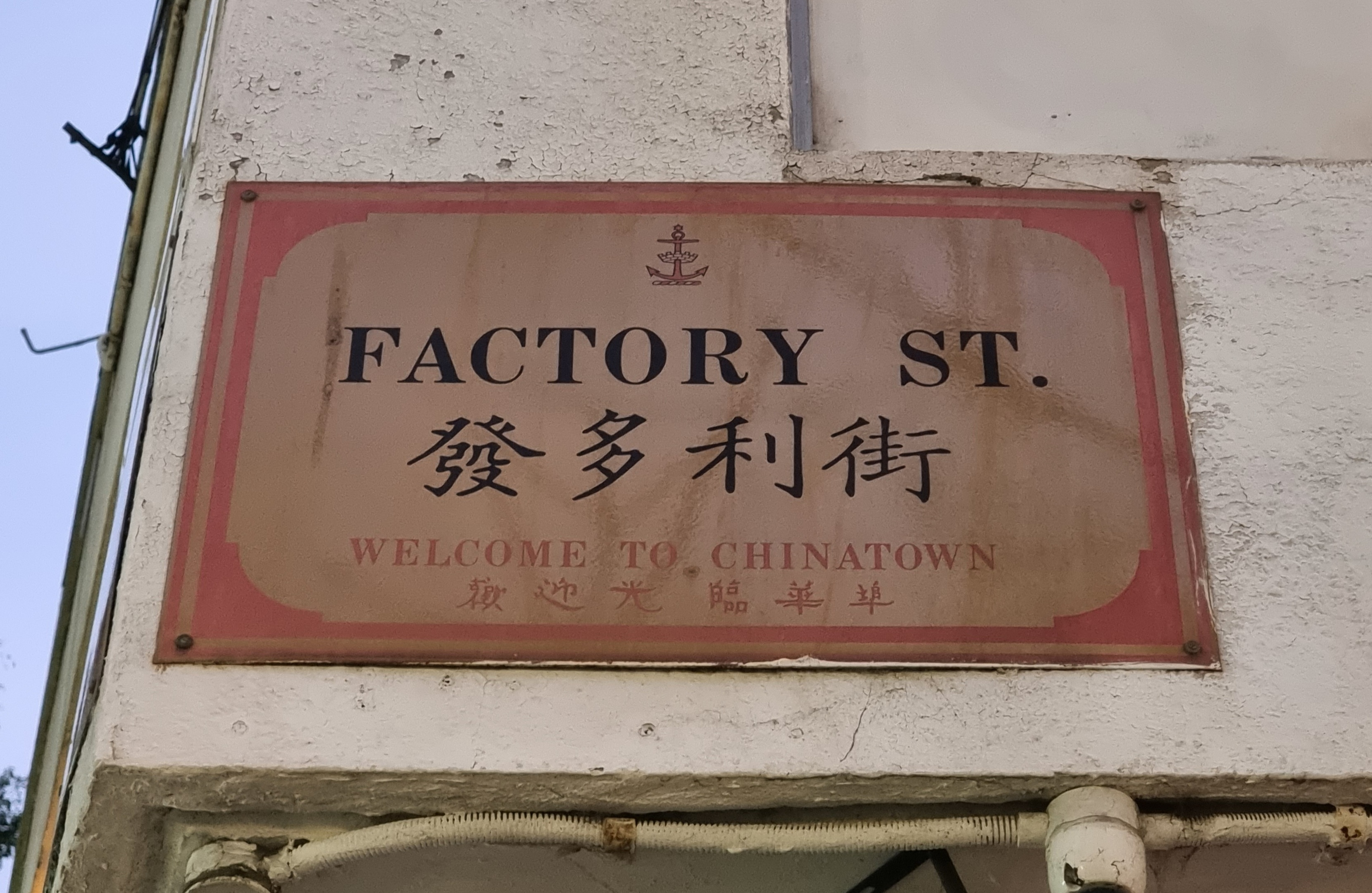
Factory Street; 發多利街 (Cantonese: Faatdōleih Gāai; Mandarin: Faduōlì Jiē)

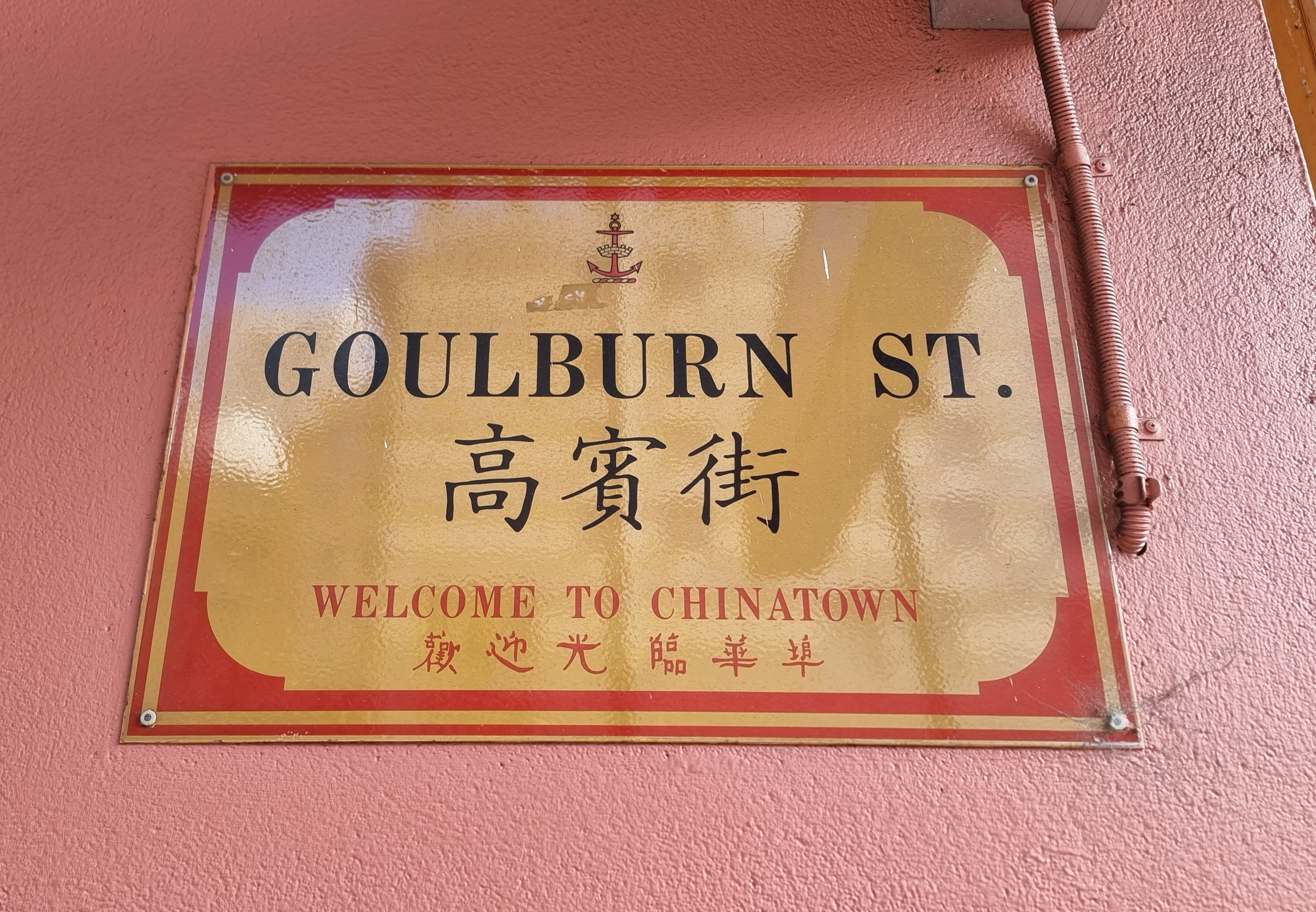
Goulburn Street; 高賓街 (Cantonese: Gōubān Gāai; Mandarin: Gāobīn Jiē)

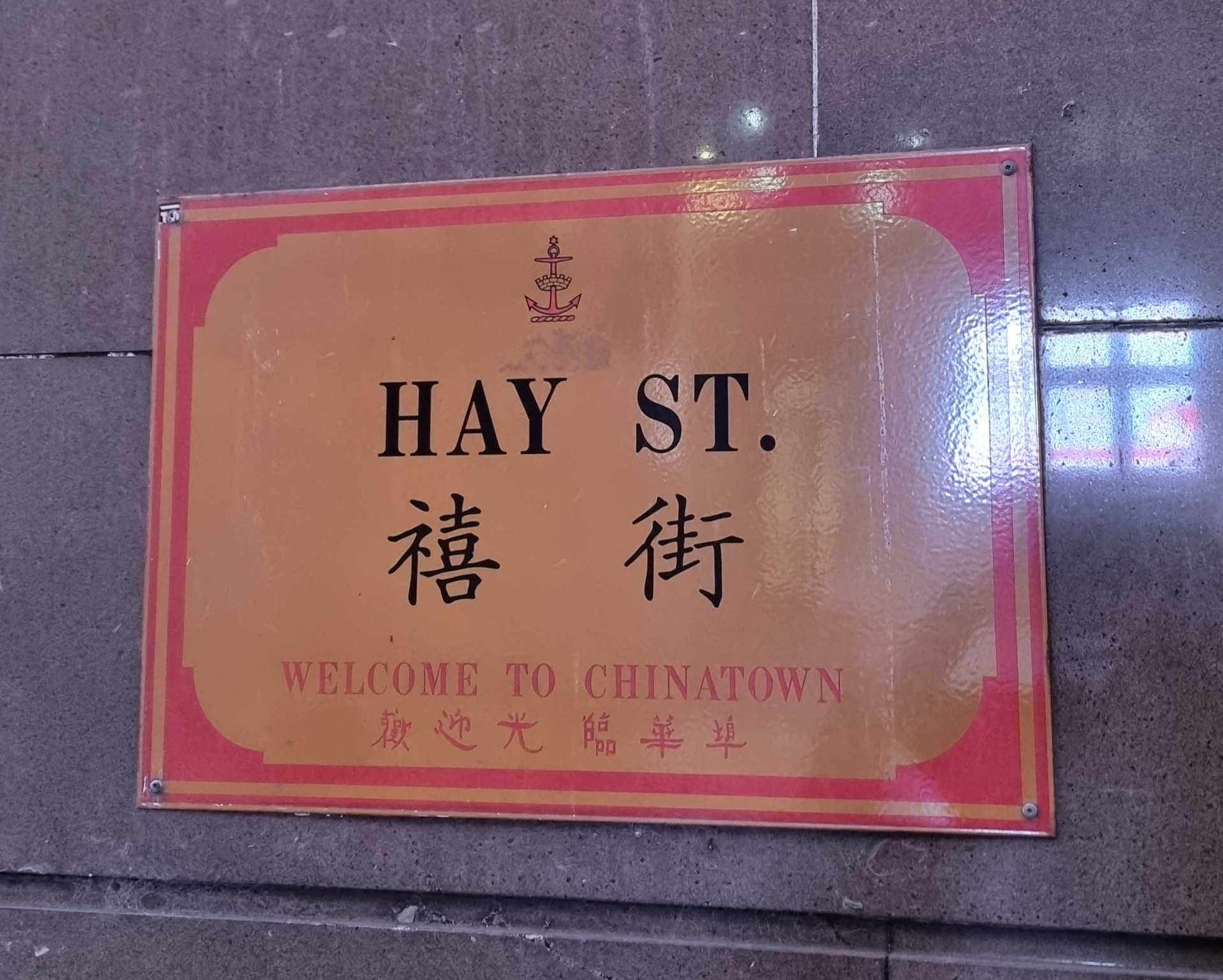
Hay Street; 禧街 (Cantonese: Hēi Gāai; Mandarin: Xǐ Jiē)

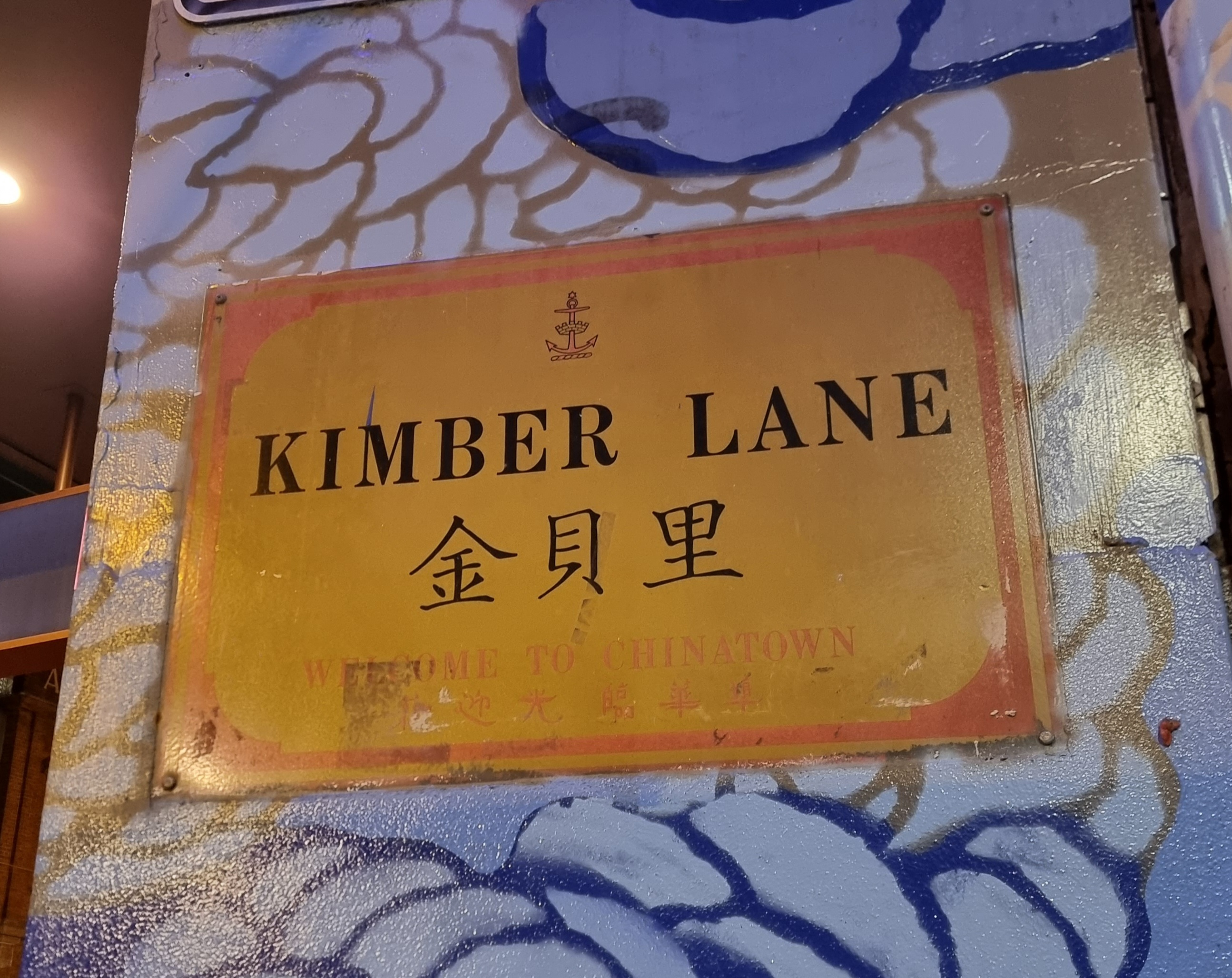
Kimber Lane; 金貝里 (Cantonese: Gāmbui Léih; Mandarin: Jīnbèi Lǐ)

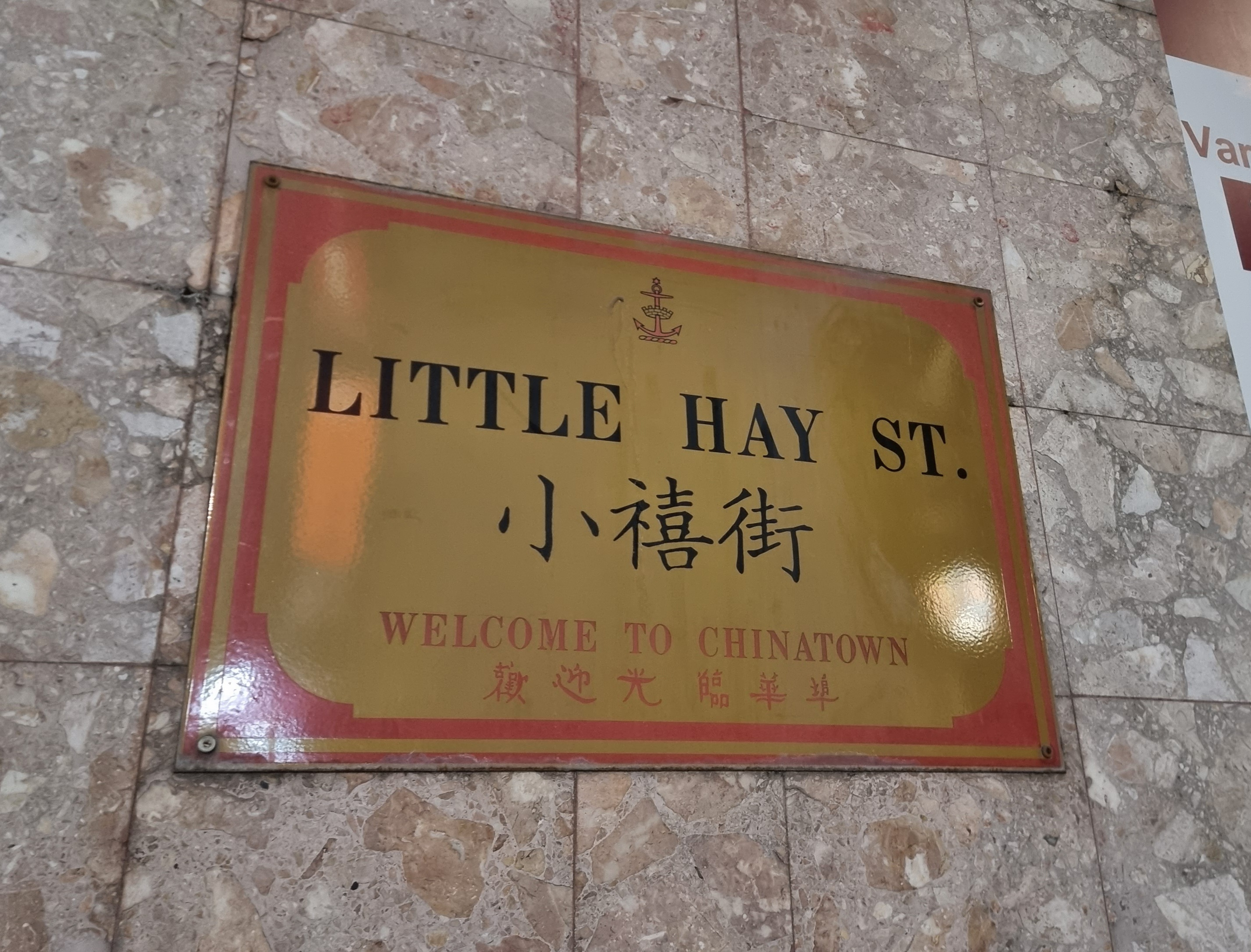
Little Hay Street; 小禧街 (Cantonese: Síuhēi Gāai; Mandarin: Xiǎoxǐ Jiē)

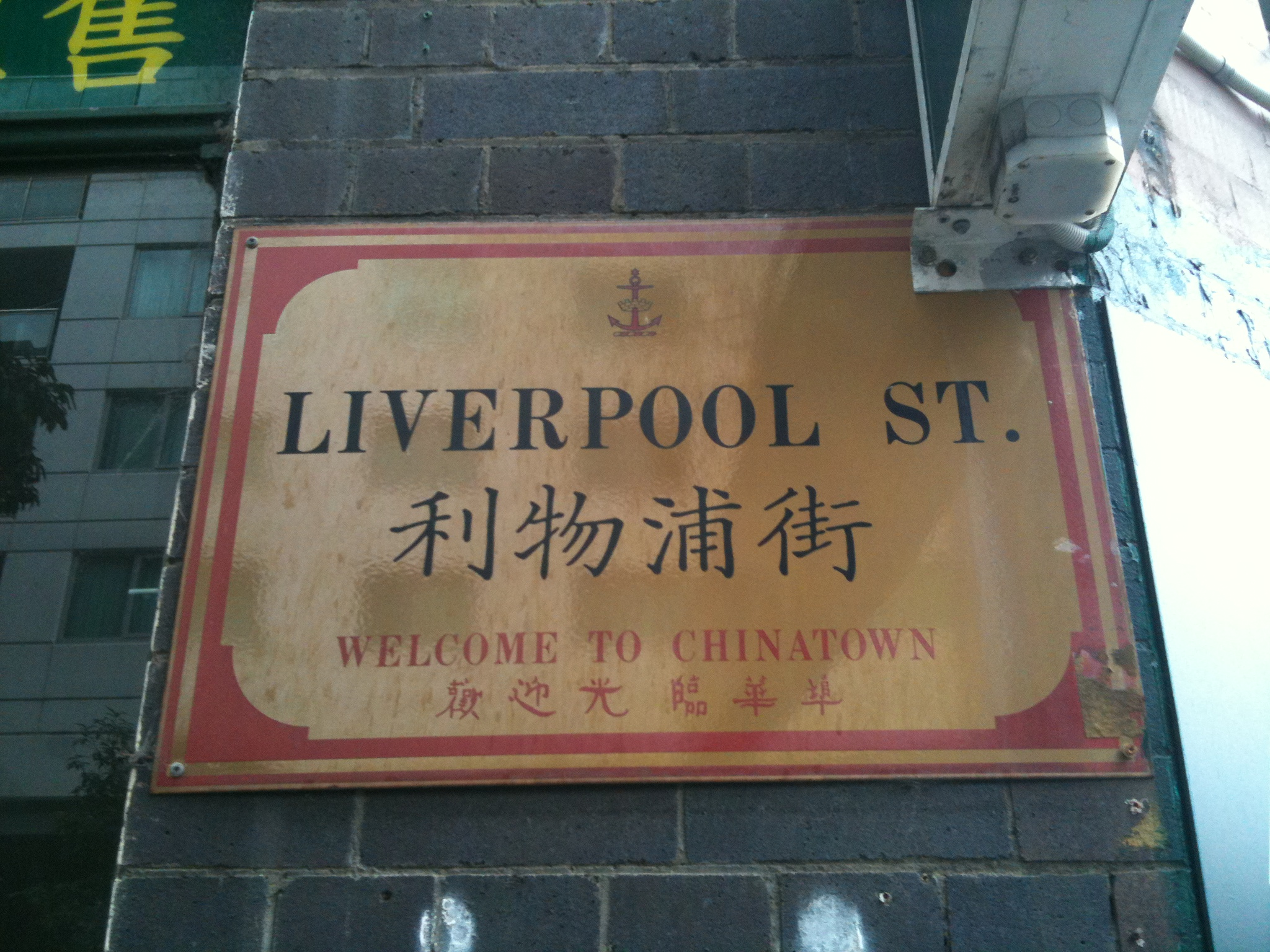
Liverpool Street; 利物浦街 (Cantonese: Léihmáhtpóu Gāai; Mandarin: Lìwùpǔ Jiē)

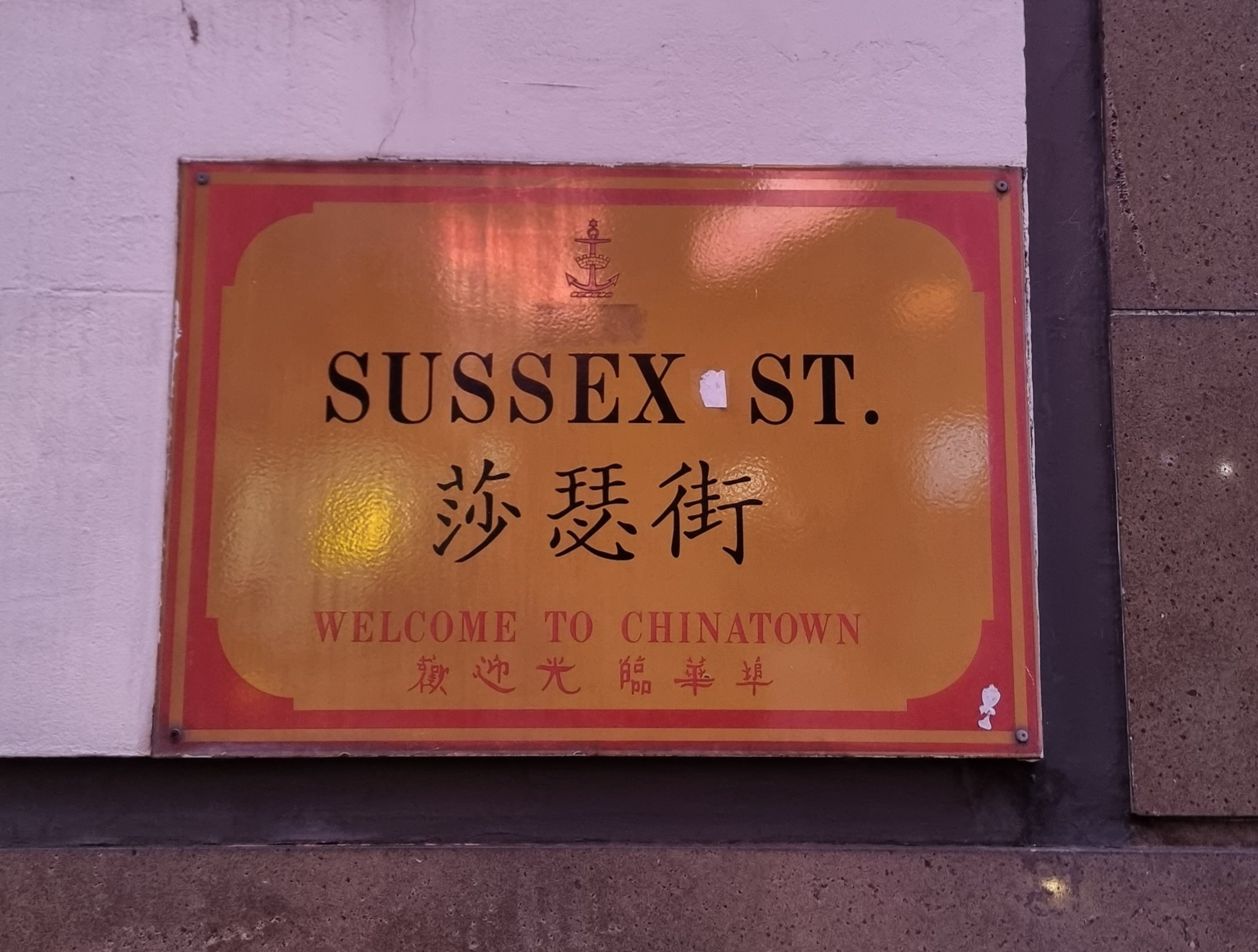
Sussex Street; 莎瑟街 (Cantonese: Sāsāt Gāai; Mandarin: Shāsè Jiē)

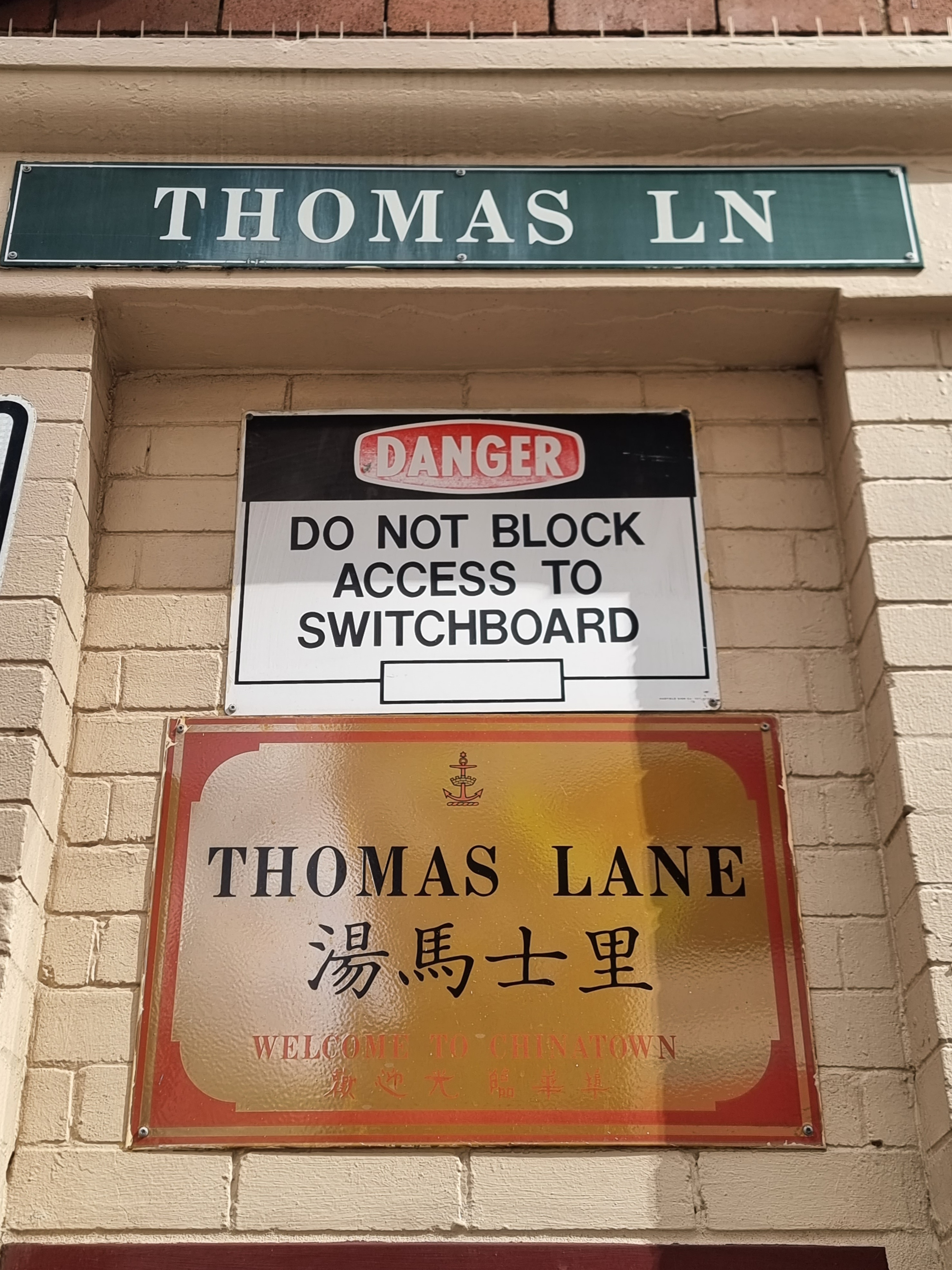
Thomas Lane; 湯馬士里 (Cantonese: Tōngmáhsih Léih; Mandarin: Tāngmǎshì Lǐ)

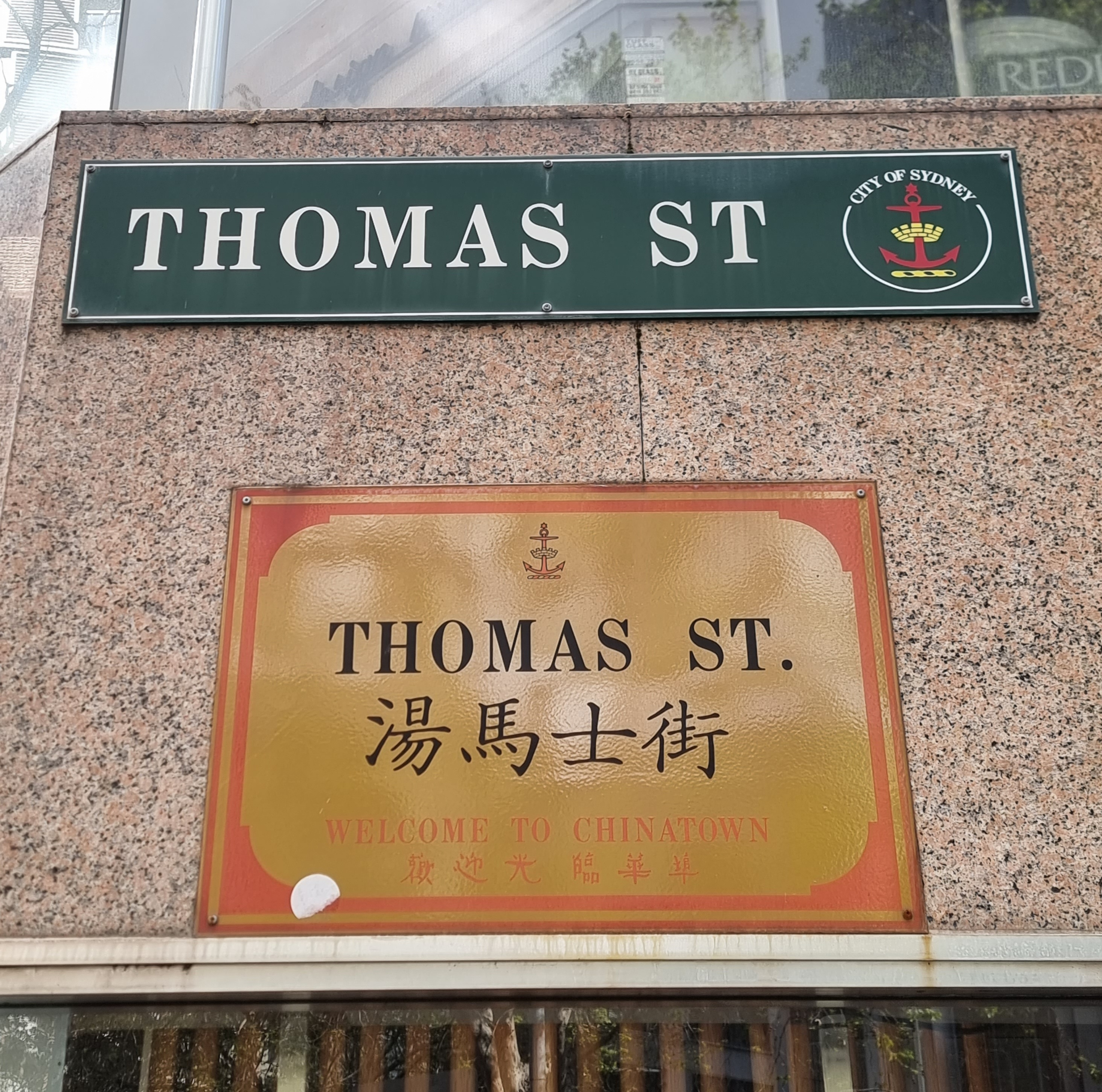
Thomas Street; 湯馬士街 (Cantonese: Tōngmáhsih Gāai; Mandarin: Tāngmǎshì Jiē)

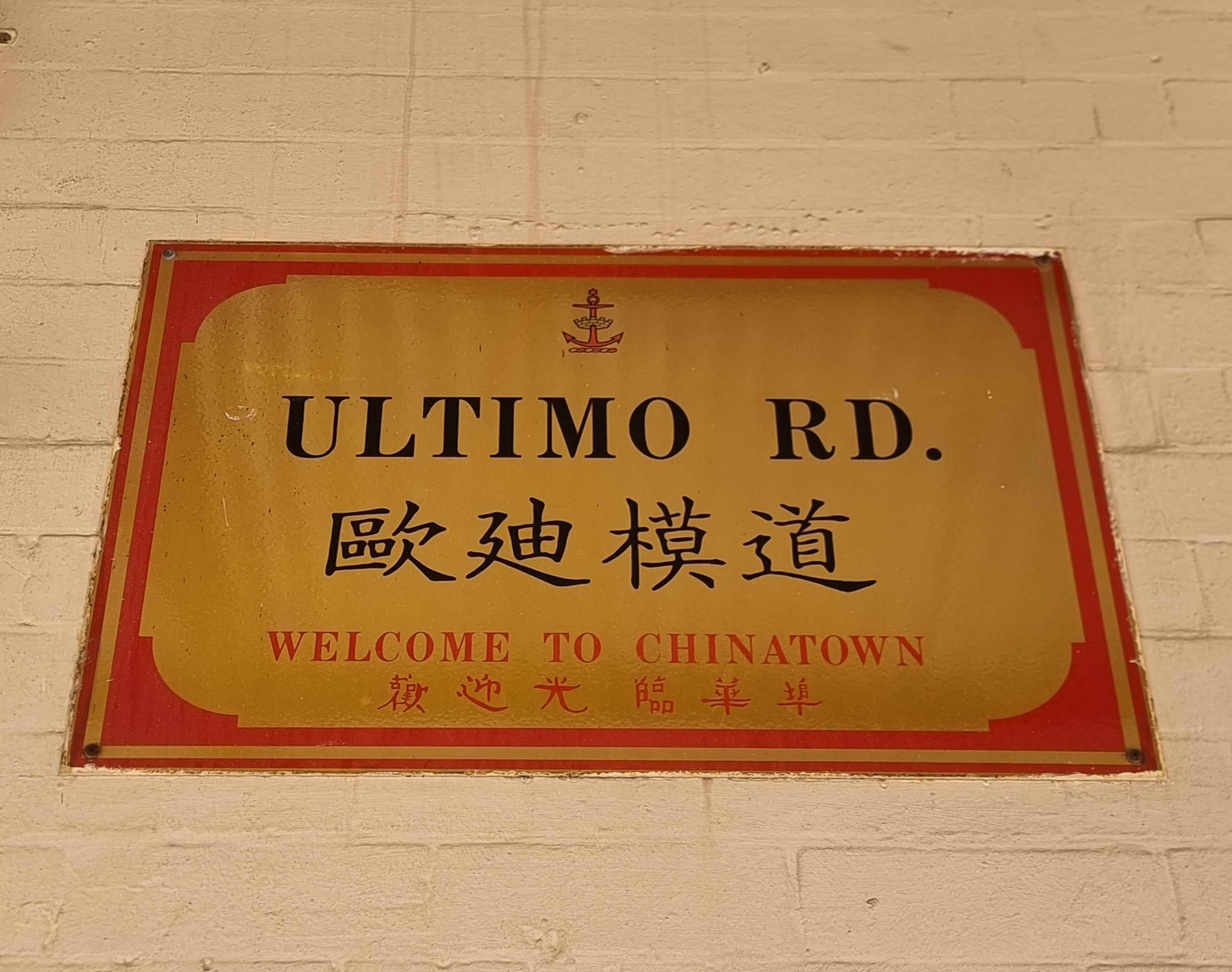
Ultimo Road; 歐廸模道 (Cantonese: Āudihkmòuh Douh; Mandarin: Ōudímó Dào)

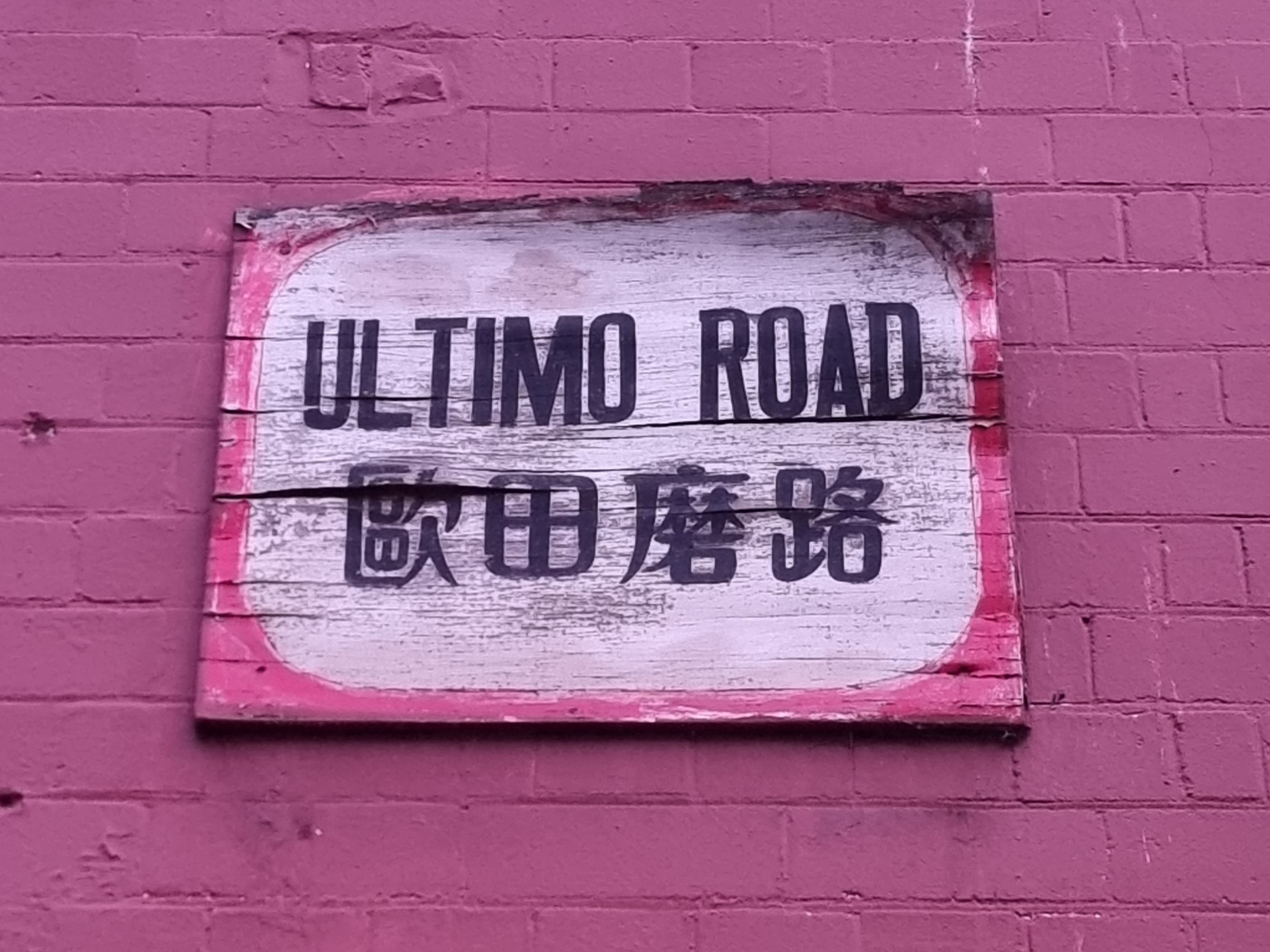
Older sign for Ultimo Road; 歐田磨路 (Cantonese: Āutìhnmòh Louh; Mandarin: Ōutiánmó Lù)

== Gallery ==
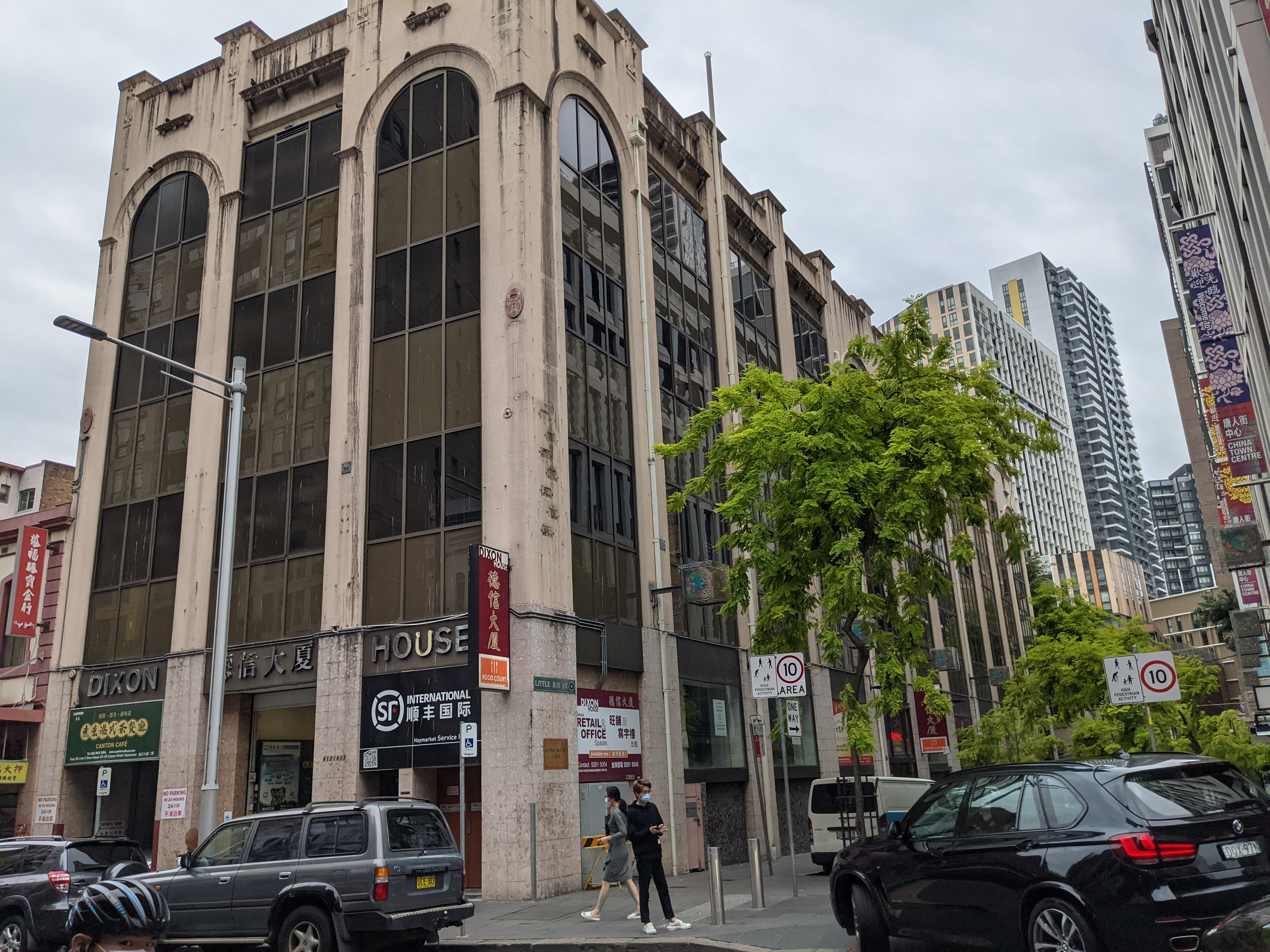
Dixon House, 80 Dixon Street, 2021

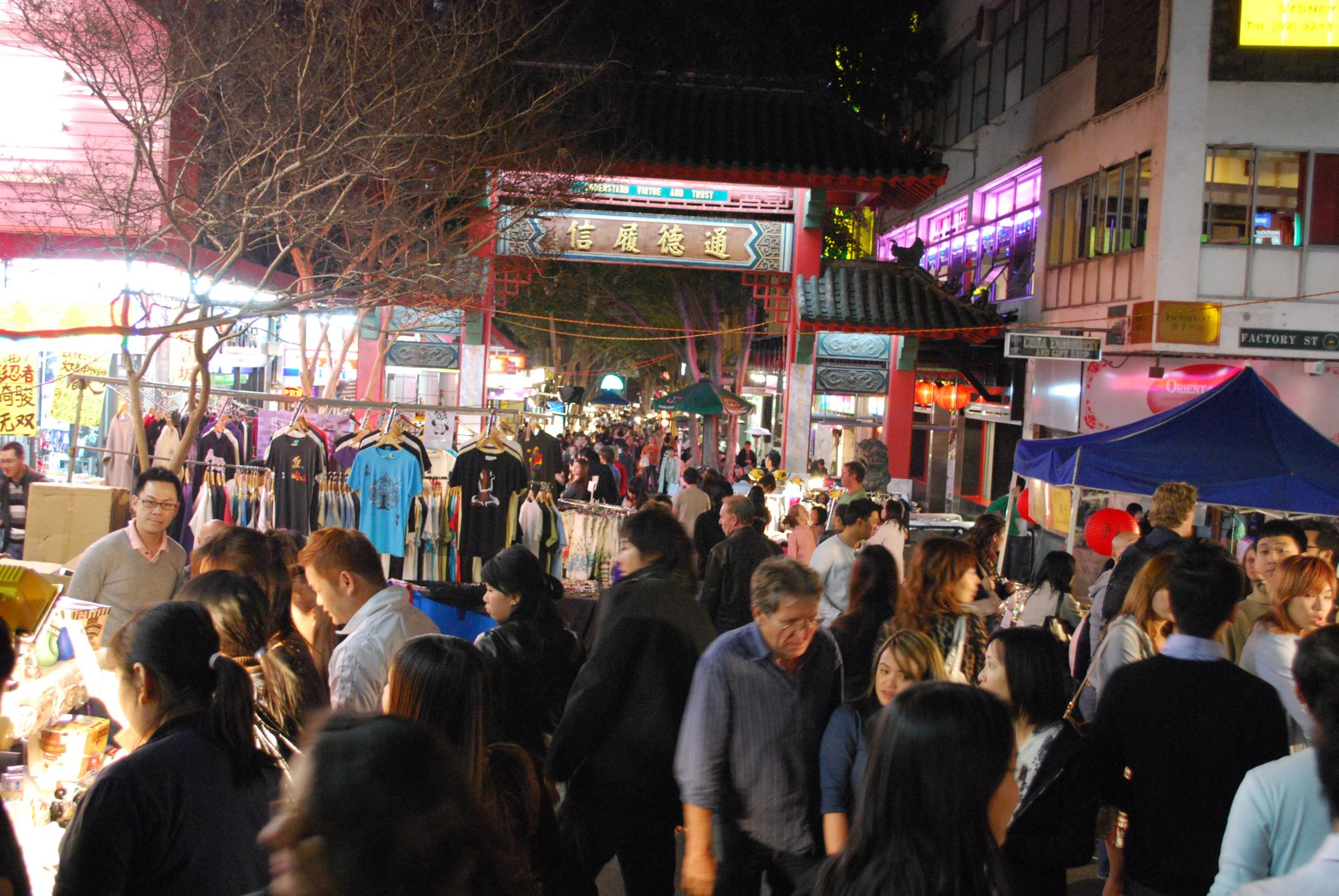
Friday Night Markets, 2009

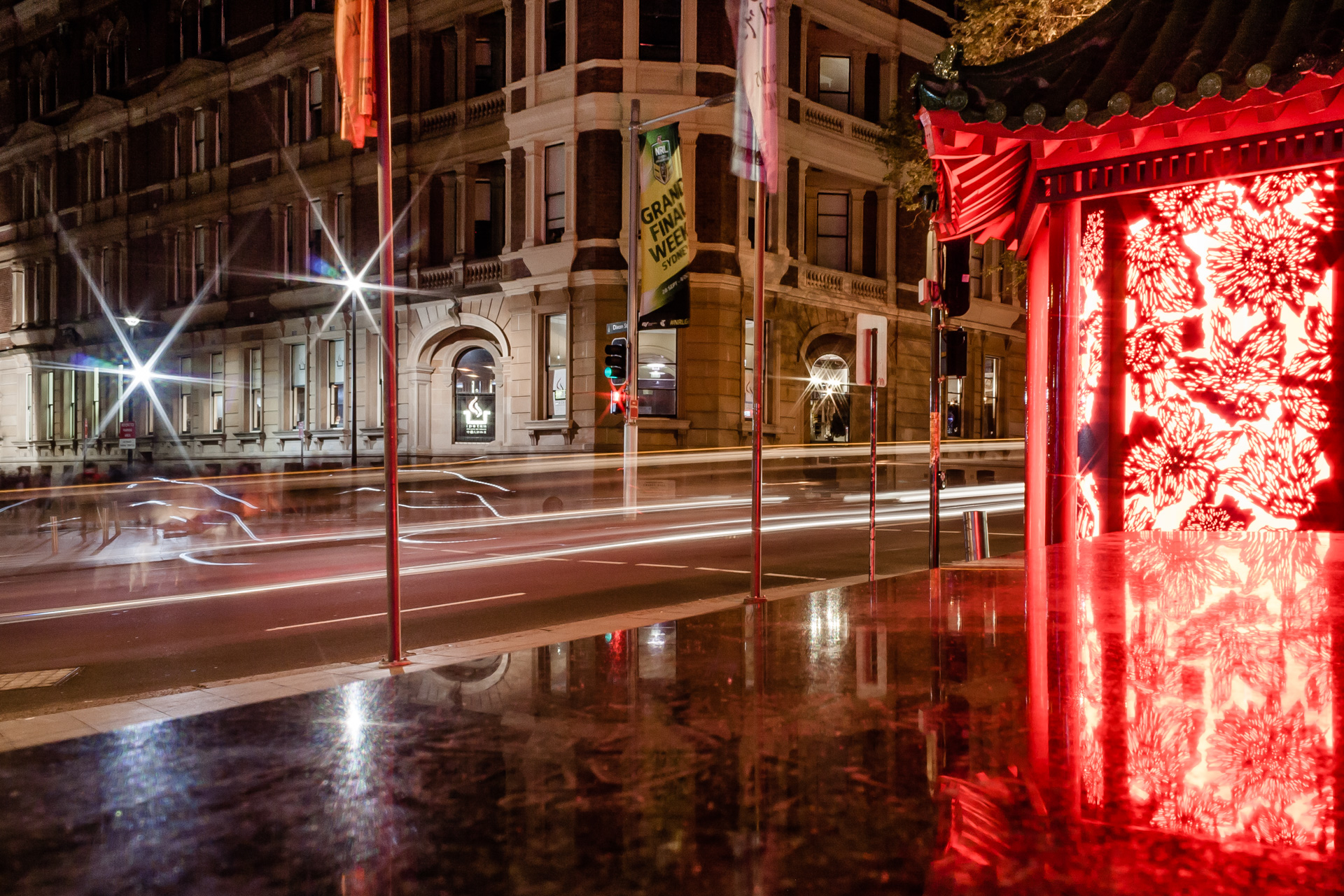
Entrance to Chinatown via Haymarket, at night, 2015

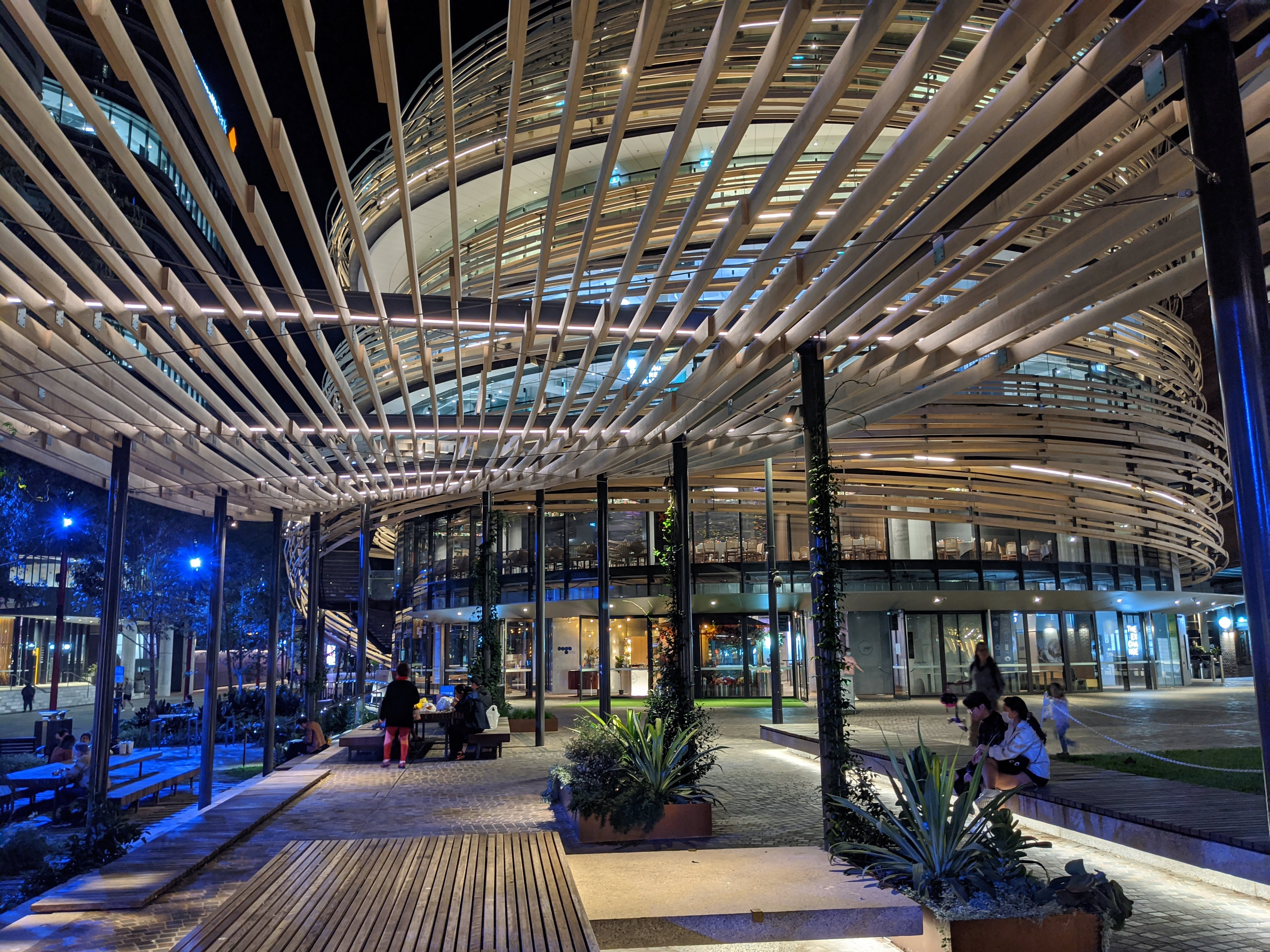
Darling Square has extended Chinatown towards Darling Harbour, 2020

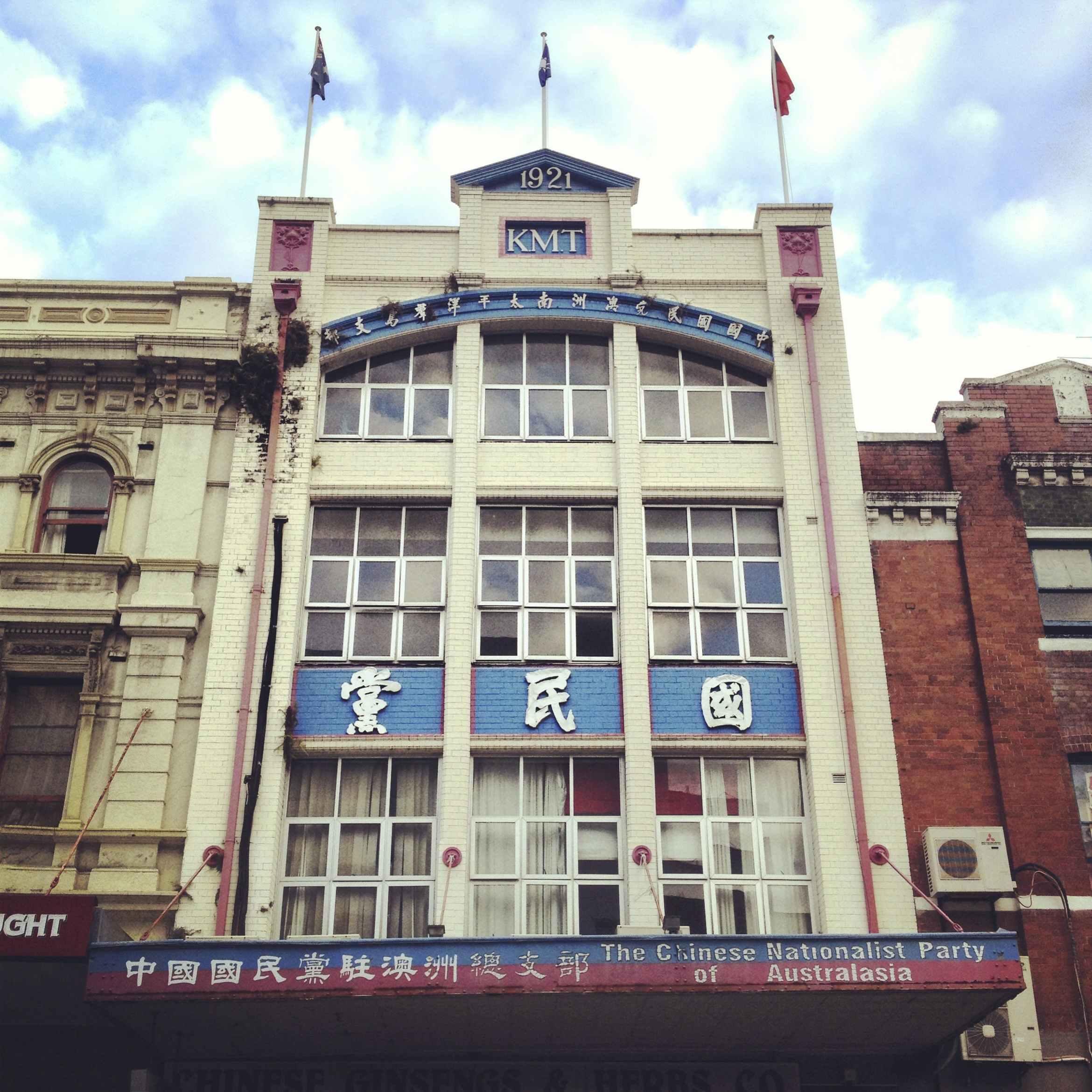
The Sydney office of the Kuomintang, 2013

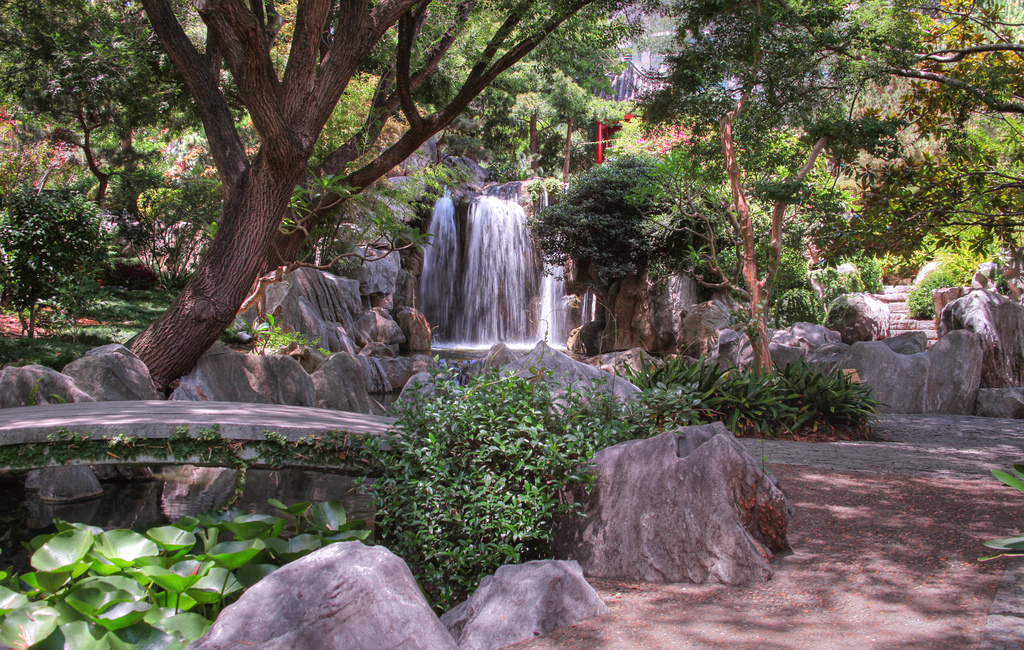
The Chinese Garden of Friendship, 2013

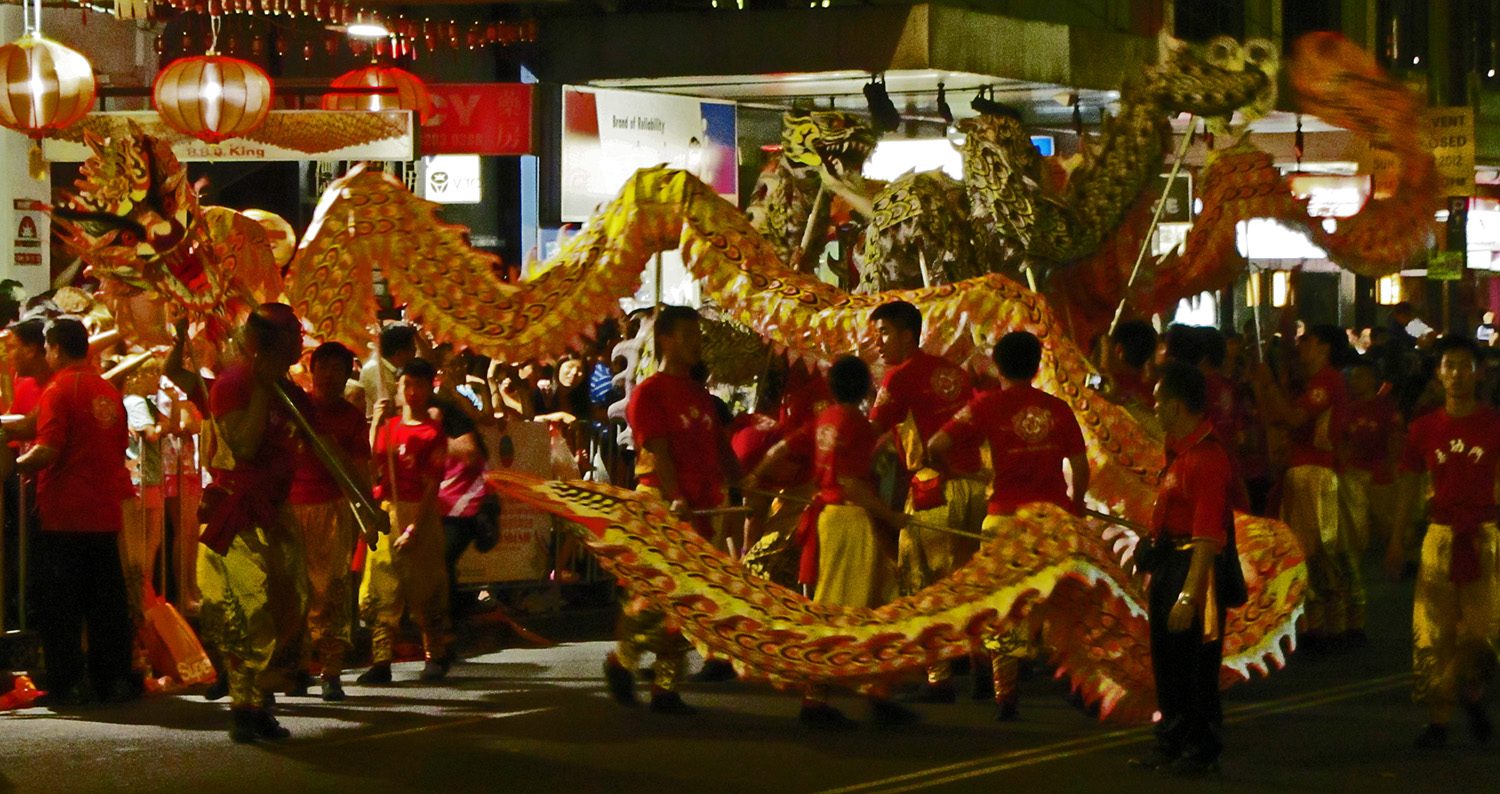
Lunar New Year celebrations, 2012

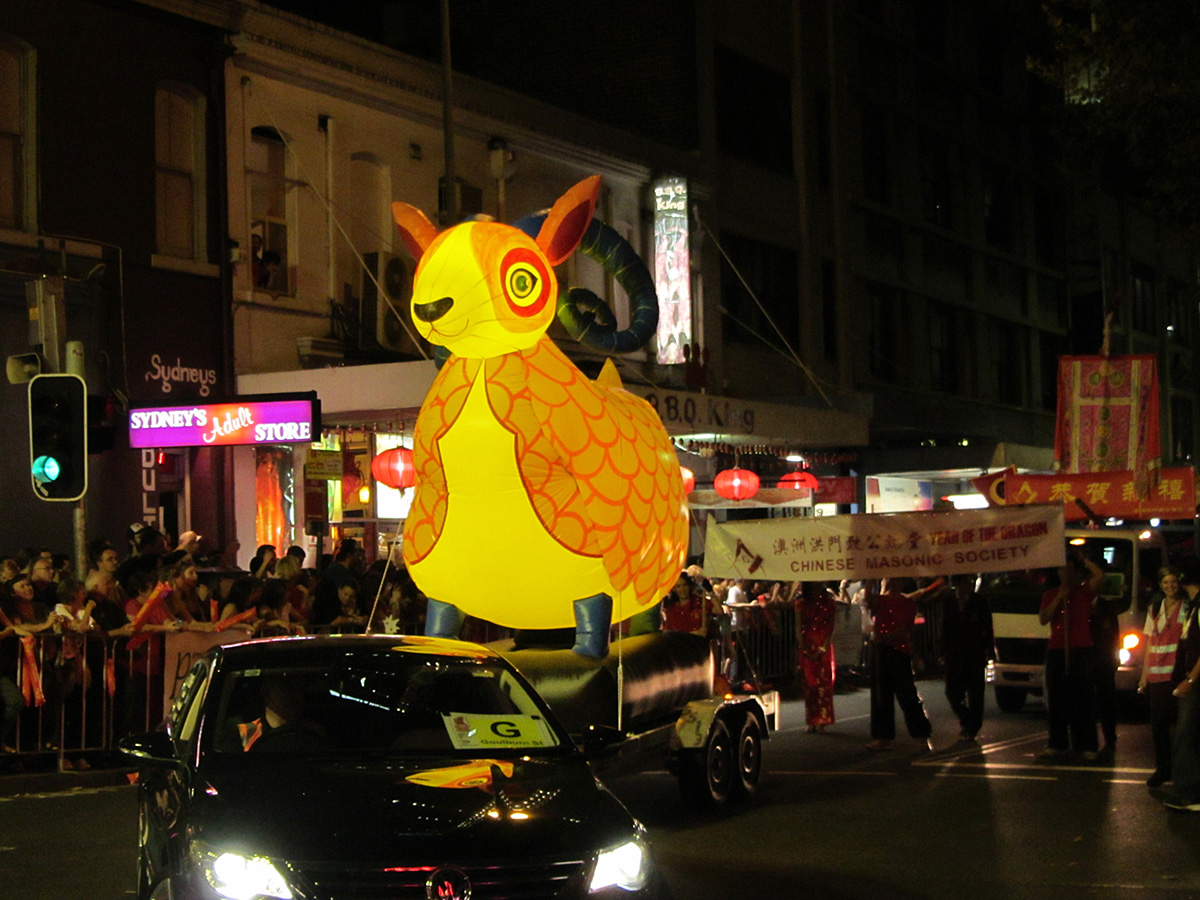
Lunar New Year celebrations, 2012

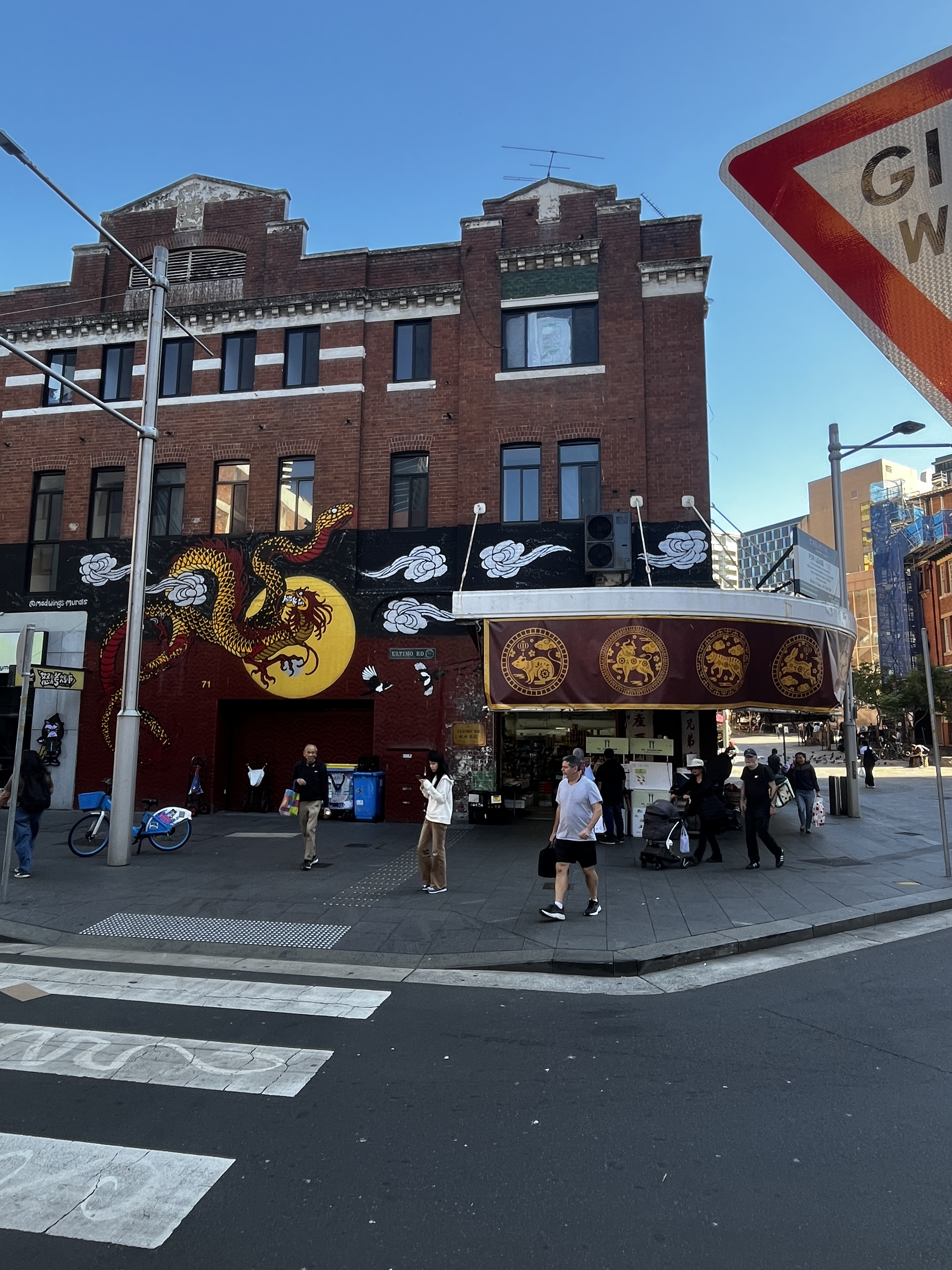
Mural celebrating the Year of the Snake, 2025

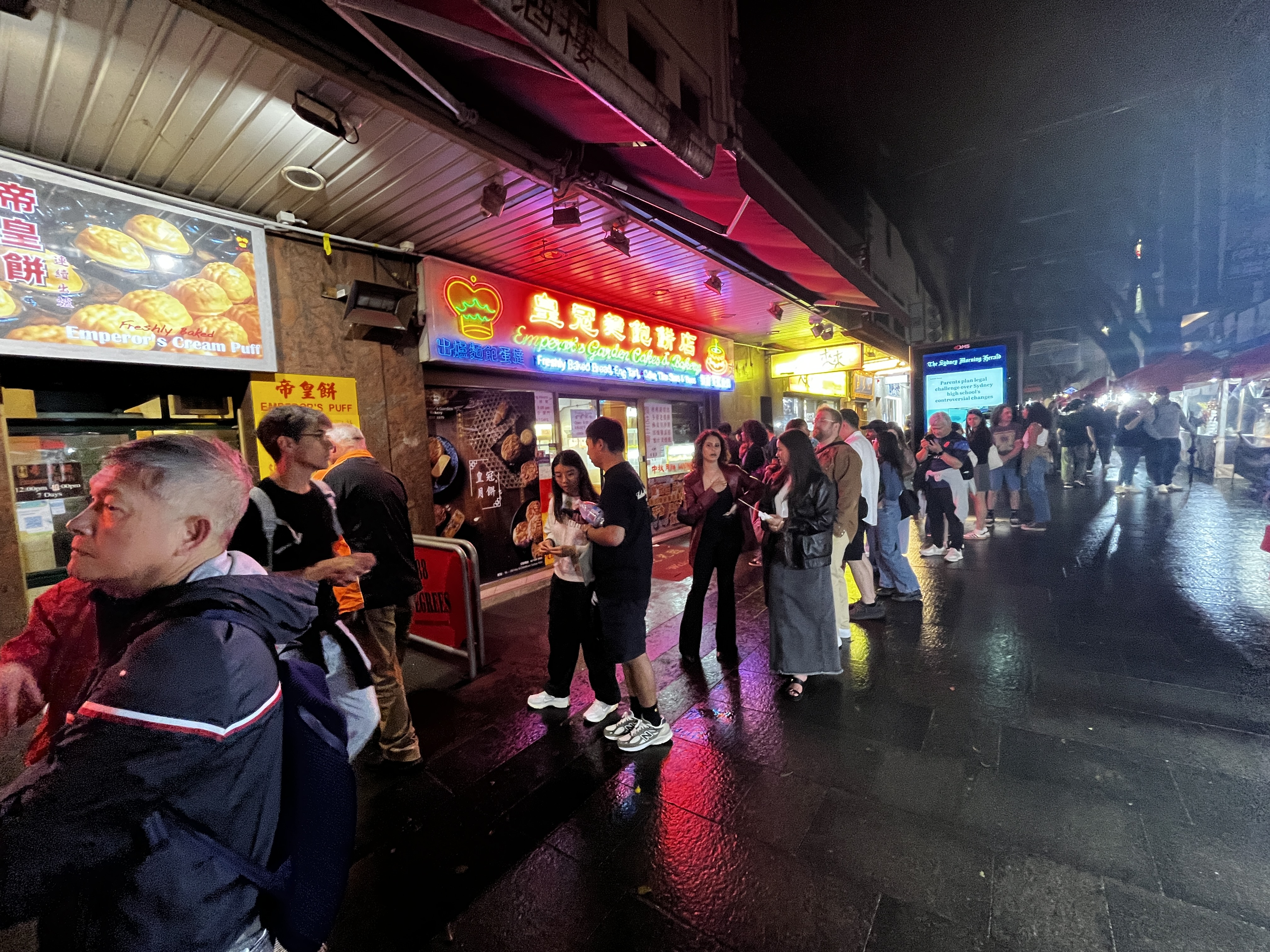
Lines at the Emperor's Cream Puff, 2025

== Cultural depictions ==
- Sydney's Chinatown is the setting and film location of the music video for David Bowie's 1983 single China Girl.
- Parts of Sydney Chinatown appear in the 1999 film Two Hands
- A scene for Dulcea's compound in 20th Century Fox's 1995 superhero film Mighty Morphin Power Rangers: The Movie
- Appeared in The Wolverine in October 2012

== See also ==
- Chinatowns in Australia
- Museum of Chinese in Australia
- Chinese Australians
- History of Chinese Australians
- Yiu Ming Temple, heritage-listed Chinese temple at 16–22 Retreat Street, Alexandria, City of Sydney
- Sze Yup Temple, heritage-listed Chinese temple at Victoria Road in the inner western Sydney suburb of Glebe, City of Sydney
- Australia-China relations
- Asian Australians
- Australians in China
