= Australians in China =

Ethnic group in China

Total population
- 55,000

Regions with significant populations
- Beijing; Guangzhou; Hong Kong; Shanghai

Languages
- Australian English; Chinese

Religion
- Protestantism; Catholicism; Buddhism; Other

Related ethnic groups
- Australian diaspora

Australians in China include Australian expatriates in China, international students, Chinese Australians as well as Chinese people of Australian descent. In 2001, there were over 55,000 Australians present in China. Of them, over 2,000 lived in the capital Beijing, an estimated 3,900 in Guangzhou and about 2,500 in Shanghai. Notwithstanding mainland China, the remaining overwhelming 46,000 Australians resided in Hong Kong. By 2010, the number of Australians living in mainland China had grown to 13,286, according to the Sixth National Population Census of the People's Republic of China.

== Notable people ==
- David Gulasi - Social media personality in China
- Amy Lyons - Social media personality in China

== See also ==
- Australia–China relations
- Australians in Hong Kong
- Australian diaspora
- Chinese Australians
