= Amy Lyons =

Australian media personality and influencer active in China

Amy Lyons (Chinese: 李慧琳; pinyin: Lǐ Huìlín) (born 1993) is an Australian media personality and influencer active in China, where she is known as a "wǎng hóng" (网红), which in China means people who are famous on social media. She is best known for her Bilibili channel "艾米饭" and YouTube channel "Blondie in China", which explores different cuisines and delicacies in China.

== Life ==
Amy Lyons was born in the city of Sydney, and is an alumna of the secondary school Pymble Ladies' College. She stated that her interest in China began with a history class she took in her final year there in 2011, as the teacher was highly interested in the country. As an international commerce student at the University of New South Wales, she began taking Mandarin Chinese courses in 2012, and in 2014 she took a 7-month student exchange at Fudan University, Shanghai. Around 2014 she began working at a bank in Australia, but disliked it, and she also served as a rugby league cheerleader in the Manly Seabirds, the cheerleading team of the Manly Warringah Sea Eagles.

In 2015, she entered into the "Chinese Bridge" Chinese language competition and qualified to be the Australian representative. She received about 1,000 followers on Sina Weibo after the Chinese Bridge producers suggested she do so. A Chinese friend gave her a Chinese name, which Lyons said was chosen to reflect her personality.

In February 2017, she moved to Beijing to take Chinese courses at Tsinghua University, and she began learning shaolin kung fu. She stated that she decided to extend her social media activities after arriving in Beijing. In 2017, on her Chinese social media platforms she had a total of 65,000 followers. As of 2017, her most prominent social media platform was Miaopai. That year she had 1,100 followers on Instagram. She received increased social media coverage in a video called "Chopstick Legs", as she stated that Chinese people are attracted to having long, thin legs. As of 2017 it had over three million views, making it her video with the most views.

== See also ==
- Wanghong economy
- Australians in China
- Afu Thomas (Thomas Derksen) - German internet celebrity active in China
- Dashan - Canadian television personality in China
- Lee and Oli Barrett - British social media personalities in China
- David Gulasi - Australian internet celebrity active in China
- Raz Galor - Israeli social media figure in China
- Winston Sterzel - South African social media figure in China
