= Raz Gal-Or =

Israeli businessman

- רז גלאור
- Born: 1994 (age 31–32); Israel
- Occupation: Businessman
- Known for: founding Ychina (Foreigner Research Institute China), making videos
- Father: Amir Gal-Or

YouTube information
- Channel: 歪果仁研究协会 Ychina
- Subscribers: 280 thousand
- Views: 46 million
- Last updated: 9 February 2025

Chinese name
- Chinese: 高佑思
Transcriptions
Standard Mandarin
- Hanyu Pinyin: Gāo Yòusī

Raz Gal-Or (Hebrew: רַז גַלאוֹר; Chinese: 高佑思; pinyin: Gāo Yòusī; born 1994) is an Israeli internet businessman based in China. He attended the Canadian International School of Hong Kong, and is an alumnus of Peking University, where he studied international relations. He first gained media exposure in China when he got a single appearance on television. In July 2021, BBC News reported that Gal-Or was working as a stringer for China Global Television Network.

== Early and personal life ==
Raz Gal-Or, the son of Amir Gal-Or, originated from a community near Tel Aviv, and moved to Hong Kong at age 13; at the time, he lacked fluency in English and in any variety of Chinese. Frank Tang of the South China Morning Post wrote that "his China journey was driven by the ambitions of his father". Tang stated that by 2017 Gal-Or was embedded in a Chinese lifestyle and that his Mandarin was "fluent".

== Foreigner Research Institute China ==
Gal-Or operates the Foreigner Research Institute China (FRI; Chinese: 歪果仁研究协会; pinyin: Wāiguǒrén Yánjiū Xiéhuì; lit. 'The Crooked Nuts Research Institute'), also known as Y-Platform, a social media group which documents lives of foreigners in China. It is headquartered in Zhongguancun, Haidian District, Beijing. The name is a pun as "crooked nut" (歪果仁; wāiguǒrén) sounds similar to that to the word "foreigner" (外国人; wàiguórén).

The organization had been established in 2016 by Gal-Or and his Chinese co-founder Fang Yedun (方晔顿), who Gal-Or met in university and originated from Zhejiang. The series, which as of October 2017 had fifty episodes, has accounts on Bilibili, Sina Weibo, and Youku. Several of Gal-Or's social media profiles are under the name Ychina (meaning "why China?"). Infinity Group, owned by Amir Gal-Or, and Will Hunting Capital (唯猎资本; Wéiliè Zīběn) had given Gal-Or's production company a 10 million yuan ($1.51 million U.S.) investment. By October 2017 the series, which began in December 2016, had over five million subscribers in its social media platforms. About 70% of the viewers, as of 2017, were female. The initial video, by that month, had over four million views. Tang stated in 2017 that multiple advertisers began using the series.

Coco Liu of the South China Morning Post wrote that FRI "helped to grow the online profiles of many expatriates." Tang wrote that the series "propelled [Gal-Or] to nationwide fame". Charles Liu, a senior blogger of The Beijinger, characterized some of the videos produced by the FRI as "predictable responses expected of foreignness, which in turn is predictably well-received by the Chinese public."

== See also ==
- Afu Thomas (Thomas Derksen) – German social media figure in China
- Lee and Oli Barrett – British social media figures in China
- Dashan – Canadian television personality in China
- David Gulasi – Australian internet celebrity active in China
- Amy Lyons – Australian social media figure in China
- Winston Sterzel – South African social media figure in China
