= Pennon Foreign Language School, Beijing =

- 培诺外国语学校（北京）
- No.5 building, CUG, 29 Xue Yuan Road, Haidian District (Note: 北京市海淀区学院路29号教五楼); Beijing; China

Information
- Founded: 2008
- School code: 93869
- Chairman: Hong Guo
- Age range: 13-18
- Average class size: 12
- Colours: Blue, Yellow
- Website: beijing.pennon.com.cn

Pennon Foreign Language School, Beijing, founded in 2008, is a full-time Edexcel high school in Beijing Edexcel is the UK's largest A-level examination organization.

The school offers IGCSE, A-Level and GAC courses. Pennon is currently the largest Edexcel British school in China. Average scores of GCE-A Level ranks first among Edexcel's peers in China.
