= David Gulasi =

Australian Entrepreneur and social media figure active in China

David Gulasi is an Australian social media figure active in China.

In 2017 Rowan Callick of the Weekend Australian described him as "by far the best-known Australian in the country".

== Early biography ==
He grew up in the western suburbs of Sydney. His family was Turkish Australian. He attended the University of Sydney with a study programme in computers.

He initially worked in sales, and had a career in Mediterranean cuisine. He also previously did standup comedy.

== Career ==
Circa 2011 he moved to Hohhot, and began working at Hohhot No 35 Middle School. The agency he used assigned him to Hohhot even though he was at first to go to Shenyang. Gulasi later established his own training school for adult education, New World Language Training School.

Gulasi had started a social media account with some videos, and before his first major video, his follower count was 50. He gained significant social media attention when he posted a video of people making the mistake of using the word "play" to mean socialising with someone when the word is not natively used in English. Gulasi's follower count was at 5,000 followers at one point, and then to 120,000 24 hours after that. The video with the misuse of "play" was ultimately reblogged 71,100 times and received 29,880 likes and 27,400 comments.

He uses QQ and Sina Weibo, with the latter being his primary point of activity. Millennials are his main audience. He had 5 million followers on the latter by 2017. Later that year his follower count was eight million. By 2019 Gulasi had over 1.7 billion followers. Prices for advertising on Gulasi's page reached up to $60,000 U.S. dollars. By 2017 the advertising price was up to $75,000 Australian dollars.

In 2019 Gulasi posted in favor of the swimmer Sun Yang.

In 2020 David worked with Beef ledger to donate 20,000 pieces of Australian beef to those in Wuhan.

David was a former standup comedian in Sydney Australia before he decided to go to China.

In 2020 Gulasi became the CMO of NEXTYPE.FINANCE.com a Gamefi project that has over 300,000 active members within its community. Gulasi has taken part in many of their international blockchain events representing NEXTYPE as CMO.

== Personal life ==
He married a woman who he met on QQ; they have a daughter.

== See also ==
- Afu Thomas - German social media figure in China
- Amy Lyons - Australian social media figure in China
- Dashan - Canadian television personality in China
- Lee and Oli Barrett - British social media figures in China
- Raz Gal-Or - Israeli social media figure in China
- Winston Sterzel - South African social media figure in China
