= Oxford International College of Chengdu =

British international school in China

- Simplified Chinese: 牛津国际公学成都学校
- Traditional Chinese: 牛津國際公學成都學校
Transcriptions
Standard Mandarin
- Hanyu Pinyin: Niújīn Guójì Gōngxué Chéngdū Xuéxiào

Oxford International College of Chengdu (CDOIC; 牛津国际公学成都学校) is a private for-profit international school in Chenghua, Chengdu, Sichuan, China. It serves ages 14–18.

The school offers boarding facilities but does not require all students to board. CDOIC offers the A Levels.
