= The Longest Way =

2009 viral video uploaded by Christoph Rehage

YouTube thumbnail

The Longest Way is a 2009 viral video uploaded by Christoph Rehage. The video features Rehage walking 4646 km (2887 miles) from Beijing to Ürümqi during 2007 and 2008.

Rehage originally set himself a goal to walk from Beijing, China and reach his hometown of Bad Nenndorf, Germany. The walk featured in the video started in November 2007 but he stopped and withdrew from the walk in October 2008. On deciding to stop, Rehage stated "I wanted to gain back my life. I had to regain control over myself." He later walked on his longest way trail in Georgia.

The video used to be titled The Longest Way 1.0 - walk through China and grow a beard! - a photo every day timelapse, but is now titled THE LONGEST WAY 1.0 - 350 days of hiking through China - TIMELAPSE. It has received over 50 million views, as of August 2022. TIME listed the video as the #8 top viral video of 2009. Christoph Rehage finished the Longest Way on December 12th, 2023, reaching home after having departed from Beijing more than a decade prior.
