= Malvern College Qingdao =

British international school in China

Malvern College Qingdao 青岛墨尔文中学

Information
- Established: 2012
- Age: 12 to 18
- Enrollment: 750
- Capacity: 850
- Language: English
- Website: https://malverncollege.cn/en/

Malvern College Qingdao
- Traditional Chinese: 青島墨爾文中學
- Simplified Chinese: 青岛墨尔文中学
Transcriptions
Standard Mandarin
- Hanyu Pinyin: Qīngdǎo Mòěrwén Zhōngxué

Malvern College Qingdao (MCQ; Chinese: 青岛墨尔文中学) is a British international school in Chengyang District, Qingdao. It is affiliated to Malvern College in the United Kingdom, being its first overseas branch school.

== History ==
Malvern Qingdao opened in September 2012. In 2013 it had 140 students.

As of 2025, the school has approximately 750 pupils enrolled and the capacity for up to 850 pupils.
