= Lee and Oli Barrett =

British YouTuber duo

Lee and Oli Barrett are a British father-son YouTuber duo based in Shenzhen, China.

== Early life ==
Lee is the father and had lived in China for a period since before 2019. Oli, the son, formerly operated a YouTube channel related to Call of Duty and moved to China in 2019.

== Career ==
Their channel was established circa June 2019. By May 2020 the two had 100,000 subscribers. By June 2021, they had 29 million views. By July of the same year, Lee Barrett was working as a stringer for China Global Television Network (CGTN).

The Chinese government has sponsored the Barretts for some of the videos they have produced.

== Views ==
The Barretts make content defending the Chinese government and its surveillance program, stating that the Xinjiang concentration camps do not exist, and that Western media are making unfair accusations against China. Ethan Paul of the South China Morning Post wrote that "Defending China" was "The key to their rapid audience expansion". Ellery and Knowles wrote that as the Barrets took stances firmer in support of the Chinese government, "the number of subscribers increased exponentially". The two argued against the description "pro-democracy" for the anti-Hong Kong government protesters in the 2019–20 Hong Kong protests and that the Xinjiang re-education camps are good.

=== Reception ===
Gray Sergeant, a research fellow at the Henry Jackson Society, said it was difficult to trust anything the Barrett's were saying due to China's internet censorship laws. Sam Armstrong, also from the Henry Jackson Society, said "CGTN’s vloggers are modern Lord Haw-Haws." Conservative MP Tom Tugendhat called vloggers like the Barretts "useful idiots" who dictators have used to "whitewash their crimes" and asserted that "sadly the current rulers in Beijing are following the same playbook.”

== See also ==
- Britons in China
- Afu Thomas - German social media figure in China
- Raz Gal-Or - Israeli social media figure in China
- Dashan - Canadian television personality in China
- David Gulasi - Australian internet celebrity active in China
- Amy Lyons - Australian internet celebrity active in China
- Winston Sterzel - South African social media figure in China
- Propaganda in China
