= List of international schools in China =

The following is a list of international schools in Mainland China. This can include schools for children of foreign personnel, bilingual schools, and other schools which market themselves as international.

== Beijing ==
- Beanstalk International Bilingual School
- Beijing BISS International School
- Beijing City International School
- Beijing Horizon International School
- Beijing International Bilingual Academy
- British School of Beijing
- Beijing Royal School
- Canadian International School of Beijing
- Daystar Academy
- Deutsche Botschaftsschule Peking
- Dulwich College Beijing
- Harrow International School Beijing
- International School of Beijing
- Japanese School of Beijing
- Korean International School in Beijing
- Lycée Français International de Pékin
- Saint Paul American School
- Tsinghua International School
- Western Academy of Beijing
- Yew Chung International School of Beijing

== Changshu ==
- United World College Changshu China

== Changzhou ==
- Changzhou Trina International School
- Oxford International College of Changzhou

== Chengdu ==
- Chengdu International School
- Léman International School - Chengdu
- Oxford International College of Chengdu
- QSI International School of Chengdu

== Chongqing ==
- Yew Chung International School of Chongqing

== Dalian ==
- Japanese School of Dalian
- Dalian American International School

== Guangzhou ==
- Alcanta International College
- American International School of Guangzhou
- The British School of Guangzhou
- Canadian International School of Guangzhou
- Guangzhou Korean School
- Guangzhou Nanhu International School
- Huamei-Bond International College
- Japanese School of Guangzhou
- Utahloy International School of Guangzhou
- Utahloy International School Zengcheng

== Hangzhou ==
- Dingwen Academy Hangzhou
- Hangzhou International School

== Jiujiang ==
- Chefoo School Kuling Campus

== Kunming ==
- Kunming International Academy

== Nanjing ==
- British International School of Nanjing
- Nanjing International School

== Ningbo ==
- Access International Academy Ningbo
- Huamao Multicultural Education Academy
- Ningbo Zhicheng School International

== Qingdao ==
- Qingdao No. 1 International School of Shandong Province
- International School of Qingdao
- Qingdao Amerasia International School
- Yew Chung International School of Qingdao

== Sanya ==
- International School of Sanya

== Shenyang ==
- Shenyang Transformation International School

== Shenzhen ==
- International School of Nanshan Shenzhen
- Japanese School of Shenzhen
- QSI International School of Shekou
- Shekou International School
- Bromsgrove School
- Shen Wai International School
- Shenzhen College of International Education
- Green Oasis School (https://www.greenoasis.org.cn/ https://www.cois.org/about-cis/news/post/~board/reaccredited/post/201905-newly-accredited-green-oasis-school-china)

== Suzhou ==
- Dulwich College Suzhou
- Japanese School of Suzhou
- Suzhou Singapore International School
- Ulink College Suzhou

== Tianjin ==
- International School of Tianjin
- TEDA International School
- Tianjin International School
- Wellington College International Tianjin

== Weihai ==
- Zhongshi International School

== Wuhan ==
- Wuhan Yangtze International School
- Wuhan Ulink College of China Optics Valley
- Wuhan Maple Leaf International School
- Wuhan French International School

== Xiamen ==
- Manila Xiamen International School
- Xiamen International School

== Xi'an ==
- Xi'an Hanova International School
- Xi'an International School

== Xining ==
- Xining International Academy

== See also ==
- List of international schools in Hong Kong
- List of schools in Macau
- List of international schools in Taiwan (in other words, schools under the jurisdiction of the Republic of China government of Taipei)
- List of international schools
