= School for children of foreign personnel =

Type of K–12 school in China

- Simplified Chinese: 外籍人员子女学校
- Traditional Chinese: 外籍人員子女學校
Transcriptions
Standard Mandarin
- Hanyu Pinyin: Wàijí rényuán zǐnǚ xuéxiào

A school for children of foreign personnel (外籍人员子女学校) is a type of non-public K–12 school in mainland China. This type of school can only admit the children of people with foreign nationality and legal Chinese long-term residence visas, and their children are also required to have foreign nationality.

Foreign institutions, foreign-invested enterprises, offices of international organizations legally established or registered in China, and foreign citizens legally residing in China can apply to open schools for the children of foreign personnel. Opening this type of school requires approval from the Ministry of Education of China. This type of school is not allowed to engage in industrial and commercial activities and other profit-making activities in China. This type of school is not allowed to admit students with Chinese nationality.

Foreign-nationality children legally residing in China are eligible to enroll in normal public and private K–12 schools. They may but are not required to enroll in the special-designated schools for children of foreign personnel.

== Full list ==
There were, as of 28 March 2017, in total 116 schools for children of foreign personnel officially approved by the Ministry of Education of China. The school list is ordered in accordance with the official document from the Ministry of Education.

=== Beijing ===
- Korean International School in Beijing - Originally established as Beijing Korean Kindergarten (北京韩国幼儿园), taking its current name on 1 August 1998
- Beijing Korean School (北京大韩学校)
- Beijing Montessori International Kindergarten (北京蒙台梭利国际幼儿园)
- Western Academy of Beijing (北京京西学校; 'Beijing Jingxi School')
- Beijing BISS International School (北京BISS国际学校)
- Beijing Cooperation International School (北京协力国际学校)
- International School of Beijing (北京顺义国际学校; 'Beijing Shunyi International School')
- Yew Chung International School of Beijing (北京耀中国际学校)
- Beijing Longxue International School (北京龙学国际学校)
- Beijing Qiaozhi Boren International Kindergarten (北京巧智博仁国际幼儿园)
- Beijing Zhongguancun International School (北京中关村国际学校)
- British School of Beijing (北京英国学校)
- Beijing Eton International Kindergarten (北京依顿国际幼儿园)
- Dulwich College Beijing (北京德威英国国际学校)
- Australian International School of Beijing (北京澳大利亚国际学校)
- Harrow British School, Beijing (北京哈罗英国学校)
- Beijing Rego British School (北京瑞金英国学校; 'Beijing Ruijin British School')
- Beijing Sanyi International Kindergarten (北京三弈国际幼儿园)
- Canadian International School of Beijing (北京加拿大国际学校)
- French International School of Beijing (北京法国国际学校)

=== Shanghai ===
- Shanghai American School (上海美国外籍人员子女学校)
- Shanghai Community International School (上海长宁国际外籍人员子女学校)
- Concordia International School Shanghai (上海协和国际外籍人员子女学校)
- German School Shanghai Hongqiao (上海虹桥德国外籍人员子女学校)
- The British International School, Shanghai (上海英国外籍人员子女学校)
- Dulwich College Shanghai (上海德威外籍人员子女学校; 'Shanghai Dulwich International School')
- Lycée Français de Shanghai (上海法国外籍人员子女学校; 'Shanghai French School')
- Shanghai Japanese School (上海日本人外籍人员子女学校)
- Shanghai Korean School (上海韩国外籍人员子女学校)
- Livingston American School Shanghai (上海李文斯顿美国外籍人员子女学校)
- Shanghai Rainbow Bridge International School (上海虹桥国际外籍人员子女学校)
- Shanghai Singapore International School (上海新加坡外籍人员子女学校)
- Western International School of Shanghai (上海西华外籍人员子女学校)
- Yew Chung International School of Shanghai (上海耀中外籍人员子女学校)
- Britannica International School, Shanghai (上海不列颠英国外籍人员子女学校)
- Wellington College International Shanghai (上海惠灵顿外籍人员子女学校)
- Toshin International Kindergarten (上海东进外籍人员子女幼儿园)
- Shanghai Utsukushigaoka Montessori Kindergarten (上海美丘外籍人员子女幼儿园)
- Shanghai OISCA Japanese Kindergarten (上海奥伊斯嘉外籍人员子女幼儿园)
- Shanghai Angel Kindergarten (上海恩吉尔外籍人员子女幼儿园)
- Tiny Tots International Pre-School and Kindergarten (上海泰宁外籍人员子女幼儿园)

=== Tianjin ===
- Tianjin Japanese School (天津日本人学校)
- Tianjin MTI International School (天津MTI国际学校)
- Tianjin Aihua Kindergarten (天津爱华幼儿园)
- Kinder world International Kindergarten (Tianjin) (幼儿天地国际幼儿园; 'Toddler World International Kindergarten')
- Tianjin Rego International School (天津瑞金国际学校; 'Tianjin Ruijin International School')
- Korean International School in Tianjin (天津韩国国际学校; 'Tianjin Korean International School')
- Tianjin Shiyuan Kindergarten (天津世源幼儿园)
- Tianjin Korean Star Country Kindergarten (天津韩国星国幼儿园; 'Tianjin Korea Xingguo Kindergarten')
- Wellington College International Tianjin (天津惠灵顿国际学校; 'Wellington International School Tianjin')
- Tianjin TEMS World Academy (天津杰美司国际学校; 'Tianjin James International School')

=== Chongqing ===
- Yew Chung International School of Chongqing (重庆耀中国际学校)

=== Hebei ===
- Cangzhou Zhenhua Korean International School (沧州振华韩国国际学校)

=== Guangdong ===
- Guangzhou Oisijia Japanese Kindergarten (广州奥伊斯嘉日本语幼儿园)
- Guangzhou Enhui School (广州恩慧学校)
- American International School of Guangzhou (广州美国人国际学校; 'Guangzhou American International School')
- Japanese School of Guangzhou (广州日本人学校; 'Guangzhou Japanese School')
- Utahloy International School Guangzhou (广州誉德莱国际学校; 'Guangzhou Yudelai International School')
- Shekou International School (广东蛇口国际学校; 'Guangdong Shekou International School')
- QSI International School of Zhuhai (珠海科爱赛国际学校; 'Zhuhai Ke Ai Sai International School')
- QSI International School of Shenzhen (蛇口科爱赛国际学校; 'Shekou Ke Ai Sai International School')
- CNOOC and Shell Petrochemical Co., Ltd. International School (中海壳牌石油化工有限公司国际学校)
- Guangzhou Nanhu International School (广州南湖国际学校)
- Korean International School in Shenzhen (深圳韩国国际学校; 'Shenzhen Korean International School')
- Shenzhen American International School (深圳深美国际学校; 'Shenzhen Shenmei International School')
- Utahloy International School Zengcheng (增城誉德莱国际学校; 'Zengcheng Yudelai International School')
- British School of Guangzhou (广州英国学校; 'Guangzhou British School')
- Shenzhen Japanese School (深圳日本人学校)
- International School of Nanshan Shenzhen (深圳南山国际学校; 'Shenzhen Nanshan International School')
- Zhuhai International School (珠海国际学校)
- Dongguan Wensheng International School (东莞文盛国际学校)

=== Jiangsu ===
- Nanjing International School (南京国际学校)
- Suzhou Singapore International School (苏州新加坡国际学校)
- Wuxi New District International School (无锡新区国际学校)
- Taihu International School (太湖国际学校)
- Eton House International School Suzhou (苏州依顿国际学校; 'Suzhou Eton (Yidun) International School')
- Suzhou Japanese School (苏州日本人学校)
- Wuxi Korean School (无锡韩国人学校)
- Dulwich College Suzhou (苏州德威英国国际学校)
- Nanjing British School (南京英国学校)
- EtonHouse International School Wuxi (无锡伊顿国际学校; 'Wuxi Eton (Yidun) International School')

=== Shandong ===
- Qingdao MTI International School (青岛MTI国际学校)
- Qingdao International School (青岛国际学校)
- Jinan International School (济南国际学校)
- Yantai Korean School (烟台韩国学校)
- Qingdao Korean International School (青岛韩国国际学校)
- Qingdao Yuehua Korean School (青岛悦华韩国学校)
- Qingdao Japanese School (青岛日本人学校)
- Weihai Zhongshi Korean International School (威海中世韩国国际学校)
- Qingdao Future Korean International Kindergarten (青岛未来韩国国际幼儿园)
- Qingdao Qingyun International School (青岛青云国际学校)
- Yew Chung International School Qingdao (青岛耀中国际学校)
- Qingdao Meiya International School (青岛美亚国际学校)

=== Fujian ===
- Xiamen International School (厦门国际学校)
- Minxia International School (岷厦国际学校)
- Fuzhou International School (福州国际学校)

=== Jilin ===
- Yanbian International Academy (延边外籍人员子女学校; 'Yanbian Foreign Personnel Children’s School')
- Changchun American International School (长春美国国际学校)

=== Shaanxi ===
- Xi'an International School (西安国际学校)
- Xi An Jia-Hoo International School (西安嘉惠国际学校; 'Xi’an Jiahui International School')

=== Liaoning ===
- Japanese School of Dalian (大连日本人学校; 'Dalian Japanese School')
- Dalian Korean International School (大连韩国国际学校)
- Dalian American International School (大连美国国际学校)
- Dalian Maple Leaf School for Children of Foreign Personnel (大连枫叶外籍人员子女学校)
- Shenyang Korean International School (沈阳韩国国际学校)
- Shenyang Yuanyuan International School (沈阳远见国际学校)

=== Yunnan ===
- Kunming International School (昆明国际学校)

=== Zhejiang ===
- Hangzhou International School (杭州国际学校)
- Hangzhou Japanese School (杭州日本人学校)

=== Hubei ===
- Wuhan International Wenfa School (武汉国际文法学校)
- Wuhan Yangtze International School (武汉长江国际学校)

=== Hunan ===
- Changsha WES Academy (长沙玮希国际学校; 'Changsha Weixi International School')

=== Qinghai ===
- Xining International Academy (西宁外籍人员子女学校; 'Xining School for Children of Foreign Personnel')

=== Sichuan ===
- Chengdu International School (成都爱思瑟国际学校; 'Chengdu Ai Si Se International School')
- Léman International School - Chengdu (四川乐盟国际学校; 'Sichuan Lemeng International School')

=== Jiangxi ===
- Nanchang International School (南昌国际学校)

== Former ==
- Shanghai Rego International School (上海瑞金国际学校; 'Shanghai Ruijin International School')

== See also ==
- List of international schools in China
