= International schools in Guangzhou =

This is a list of international schools in Guangzhou, China:

- American International School of Guangzhou
- Canadian International School of Guangzhou
- Guangzhou Nanfang International School
- Clifford International School
- The British School of Guangzhou
- Japanese School of Guangzhou
- Guangzhou Korean School
- Utahloy International School of Guangzhou
- Huamei-Bond International College
- Ulink College Guangzhou
- Nansha College Preparatory Academy
- Fettes College Guangzhou
