= CDIS =

CDIS may refer to:

- The CDIS (computer-based system) air-traffic control system by Praxis.
- The abbreviated name of Chengdu International School, an international school for expatriate children in Chengdu, China.
