= XIS =

XIS may refer to:

- Xi'an International School, Xi'an, Shaanxi, China; a private international school
- Xiamen International School, Xiamen, Fujian, China; a private secondary school for foreigners
- Kisan dialect (ISO 639 language code xis) of the Kurukh language, a North Dravidian language of East India
- Xis, a Brazilian rapper featured on the 2001 album Acústico MTV: Cássia Eller
- X-ray imaging spectrometer (XIS), an astronomical instrument aboard the Japanese X-ray space telescope Suzaku (satellite)

== See also ==
- XI (disambiguation), for the singular of XIs
- Xi (disambiguation), for the singular of Xis
