= American International School of Cape Town =

American International School of Cape Town (AISCT)

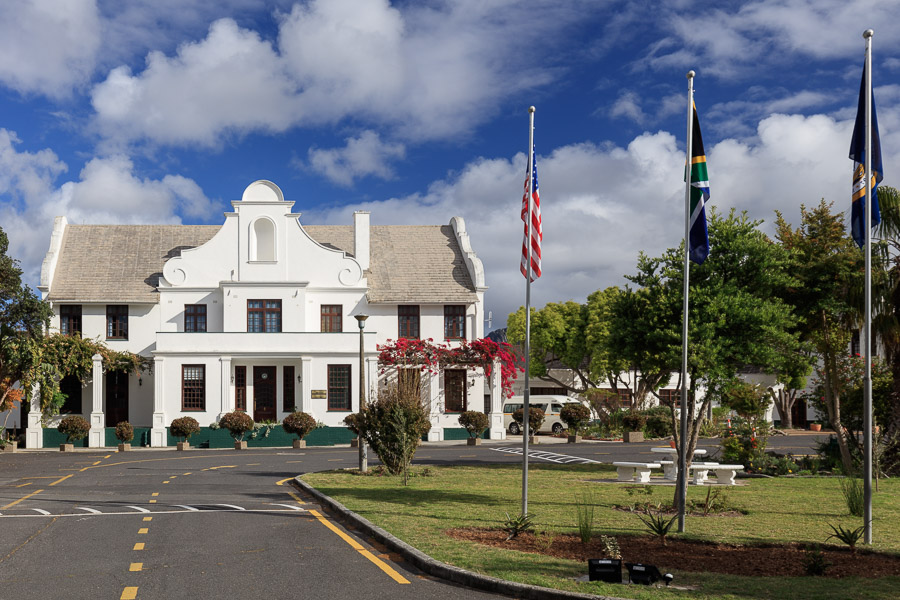
- Main entrance

Location
- 42 Soetvlei Avenue; Cape Town, Western Cape, 7806; South Africa; 34°02′53″S 18°26′19″E

Information
- Type: Private international school
- Motto: Communitas (Latin for "Community")
- Established: 1997
- CEEB code: 640182
- Headmaster: Daniel Jubert
- Exam board: Advanced Placement (AP); SAT
- Faculty: 50+
- Grades: Nursery–12
- Gender: Co-educational
- Enrollment: 500+
- Average class size: 16
- Campus size: 12 acres
- Campus type: Suburb
- Athletics: 10+
- Mascot: Grizzly Bear
- Accreditation: Accrediting Commission for Schools, Western Association of Schools and Colleges (ACS WASC)
- Website: www.aisct.org

The American International School of Cape Town (AISCT) is a private, non-profit, co-educational institution founded in 1997. The school educates 500 students from 50 countries, ranging in age between 2 and 18 years and instructed by teachers from around the world. The school has an average class size of 16 students with a student-teacher ratio of 10:1. AISCT is accredited by the Western Association of Schools and Colleges (WASC) and endorsed as an independent school by the Western Cape Education Department.

AISCT is located on 12 acres in Constantia Hills. The AISCT campus earned a Silver Status as an Eco School. The school’s water supply is collected from rainwater and groundwater. The school has been retrofitted with LED lights and solar panels contribute to 50% of its electricity needs.

== Administration ==
School Board

AISCT is overseen by a Board of Governors. The Board members have been appointed according to the bylaws of the school's Deed of Foundation. The Board is responsible for the school's fiscal solvency and overall success.

School Council

AISCT convenes a School Council throughout the course of the year. The Council consists of seven members, three of whom are community members elected by the school constituents, three of whom are appointed by the International School Foundation (ISF) Board, and one faculty representative. The foundation helped to establish the North Jakarta International School (1990), the Shanghai Community International School (1996), the American International School of Cape Town (1997), the International School of Perth (1999) and Hangzhou International School (2002). The Council serves to advise and help guide the direction of the school. The AISCT Head of school has a standing invitation to attend all meetings.

== Curriculum ==
AISCT follows the USA curriculum to include the Common Core Standards for English and math. Foreign language instruction in French and Spanish begins in Grade 1. AISCT offers College Board Advanced Placement (AP) courses in the high school, including the AP Capstone Program. Graduates receive a U.S. High School Diploma. They follow the northern hemisphere calendar, the school year begins in August and ends in June.

== Early Childhood Development Center ==
The Early Childhood Development (ECD) Center of AISCT consists of Grizzly Cubs and Kindergarten 1.

== Elementary school ==
Elementary School students take five core classes: English, math, science, social studies (history and geography), and foreign language and three electives classes, one of which is PE. Elective offerings include art, Hi-Tech, Innovation, Design, and Technology (IDT), music, vocals, drama, and production.[4]

== Upper School ==
Students have individualized schedules and take eight classes a year.

Middle School

Middle School students take five core classes: English, math, science, social studies (history and geography), and foreign language and three electives classes, one of which is PE. Elective offerings include art, Hi-Tech, Innovation, Design, and Technology (IDT), music, vocals, drama, and production.

High school

Each year students take courses in the five core areas: English, math, science, social studies, and foreign language. In addition, they take three electives which include a balance of variety and focus areas.

Graduation requirements

AISCT runs on a USA credit-based system with an ACS WASC-accredited USA high school diploma as its exit qualification.

Graduation requirements also include a certain number of community service hours, participation in Innovation Term, and the successful completion of our Senior Project (an independent research project).

Scholarship Program

AISCT started a High School Scholarship Program in 2021. It is open to South African students from previously disenfranchised population groups, providing a 100% tuition scholarship.
