= SCFP =

SCFP may refer to:

- Canadian Union of Public Employees, a trade union headquartered in Ottawa, Ontario, Canada
- School for Children of Foreign Personnel, a type of non-public K–12 school in China
