= Japanese people in China =

Japanese people in China 在中日本人
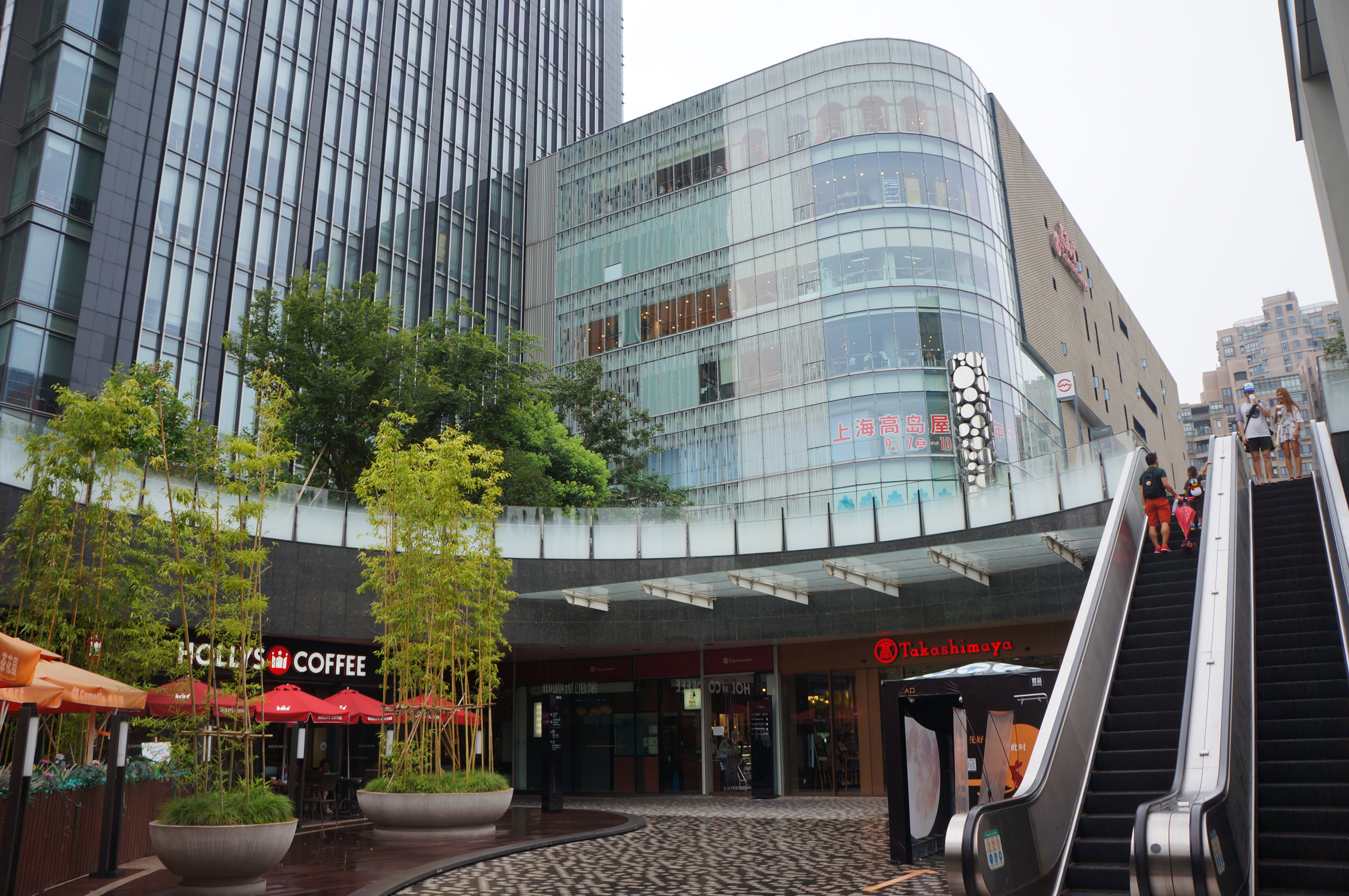
- Gubei, Shanghai is a Japanese enclave with roughly 20,000 Japanese people living in this region

Total population
- China: 171,763 (2018); Hong Kong: 27,429 (2018)^{note} Macau: 4,200 (2018); Taiwan: 24,280 (2018)

Regions with significant populations
- Beijing · Wuhan · Suzhou · Shanghai · Guangzhou · Shenzhen · Hong Kong · Macau · Taipei · Kaohsiung

Languages
- Japanese · Mandarin · Cantonese · Hokkien · English

Religion
- Buddhism · Shinto

Related ethnic groups
- Japanese people in Hong Kong

Japanese people in China

Chinese name
- Traditional Chinese: 日裔中國人
- Simplified Chinese: 日裔中国人
Transcriptions
Standard Mandarin
- Hanyu Pinyin: Rì Yì Zhōngguórén
- Wade–Giles: Jih^{4} I^{4} Chung^{1}-kuo^{2}-jên^{3}

Japanese name
- Kanji: 在中日本人
Transcriptions
- Romanization: Zaichū Nihonjin

Japanese people in China (Japanese: 在中日本人, Chinese: 日裔中國人, also known as Japanese-Chinese or Sino-Japanese) are Japanese expatriates and emigrants and their descendants residing in Greater China. In October 2018, there were 171,763 Japanese nationals living in the People's Republic of China (including the special administrative regions of Hong Kong and Macau), and 24,280 Japanese nationals living in the Republic of China (Taiwan).

== History ==
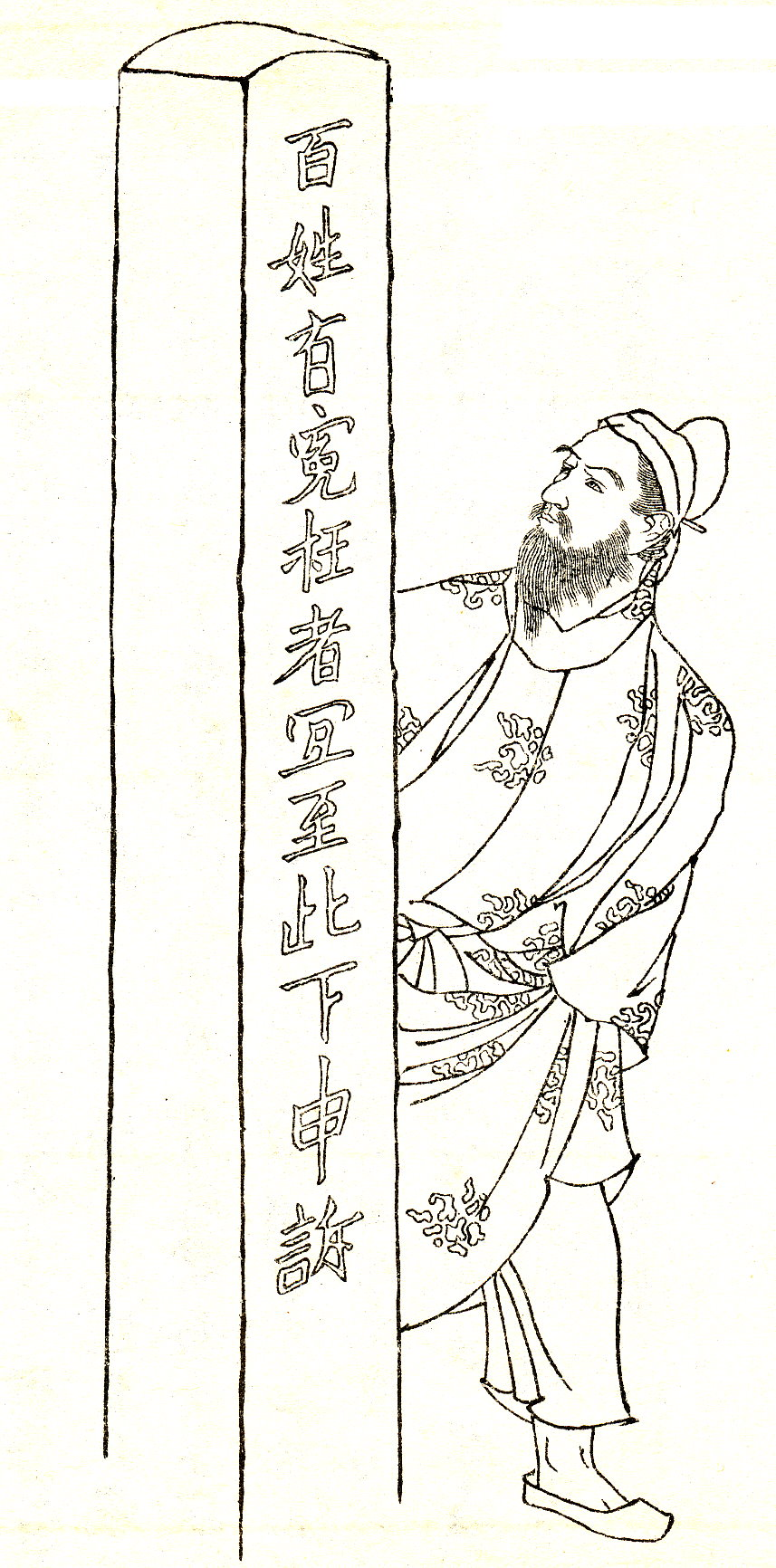
Kibi no Makibi, Japanese diplomat who lived 17 years in China.

Japanese Queen Iyo of Yamatai sent 30 Japanese female and male slaves to the Chinese dynasty Cao Wei in China as tribute, along with five thousand white pearls, two large green hooked beads, and twenty pieces of varied brocade with unique patterns, which was presented by the Japanese steward Isako, who escorted Chinese envoy Zhang Zheng back to China from Japan in the year 248.

From 630 to 894 AD, Japan sent nineteen diplomatic missions to China started by Emperor Jomei. During this time, many Japanese doctors studied Traditional Chinese Medicine, as well as many artists learning Chinese art techniques that would be brought to Japan. It is known that a third of the Japanese sent to China during missions did not return home. Tang dynasty

Tang dynasty China received 11 Japanese girl dancers as tribute from Balhae in the year 777.

=== Second Sino-Japanese War ===
During the Second Sino-Japanese War, the Japanese government introduced a plan to settle 5 million Japanese in Manchukuo. However, following the end of the war, approximately 2,800 Japanese orphans in China were left behind by families repatriating to Japan.

The majority of Japanese left behind in China were women, and these Japanese women mostly married Chinese men and became known as "stranded war wives" (残留婦人, zanryū fujin). Because they had children fathered by Chinese men, the Japanese women were not allowed to bring their children back with them to Japan so most of them stayed, as the Japanese law only allowed children fathered by Japanese men to become Japanese citizens.

=== 21st century ===
In 2000s, more Japanese were coming to China due to its opening up and economic reforms, and Japanese nationals living in China increased roughly three times from 46,000 to 140,134 in proportion to the growth in trade volume between the two countries.

The 2010 Census of the People's Republic of China recorded 66,159 foreign nationals from Japan residing in Mainland China (figure excluding Hong Kong and Macau), representing nearly half of the Japanese Foreign Affairs Ministry figure. The number of Japanese emigrants to China and their descendants are unknown. However, the peak was 2012 and recently decreasing. In 2018, the permanent resident ratio is only 2.7%.

As of October 2018, the number of Japanese nationals living in China is 140,134 (excluding 25,705 in Hong Kong and 4,200 in Macau) according to a report by the Japanese Ministry of Foreign Affairs, the third largest group of Japanese people outside Japan after the United States and Brazil.

The number of Japanese nationals living in China. This includes Hong Kong.

Shanghai has the largest concentration of Japanese nationals in Greater China. As of October 2018, 40,747 Japanese nationals are living in Shanghai. The second-largest concentrated city is Hong Kong and the third is Taipei.

Chinese men in general including students and merchants in Japan freely formed relationships with Japanese females, including schoolgirls during the late 19th and early 20th century, and Chinese male peddlers originating from Fuqing in Fuzhou, Fujian province in particular married Japanese women en masse, fathered children with them and took some of them back to Fuqing. Japanese media in the 1920s falsely depicted these relationships in a lurid manner, depicting Japanese girls as getting suckered into relations with Chinese men and demanding they be repatriated back to Japan in the lead up to the Mukden incident.

== Education ==
Locations of nihonjin gakkō in Mainland China and Hong Kong

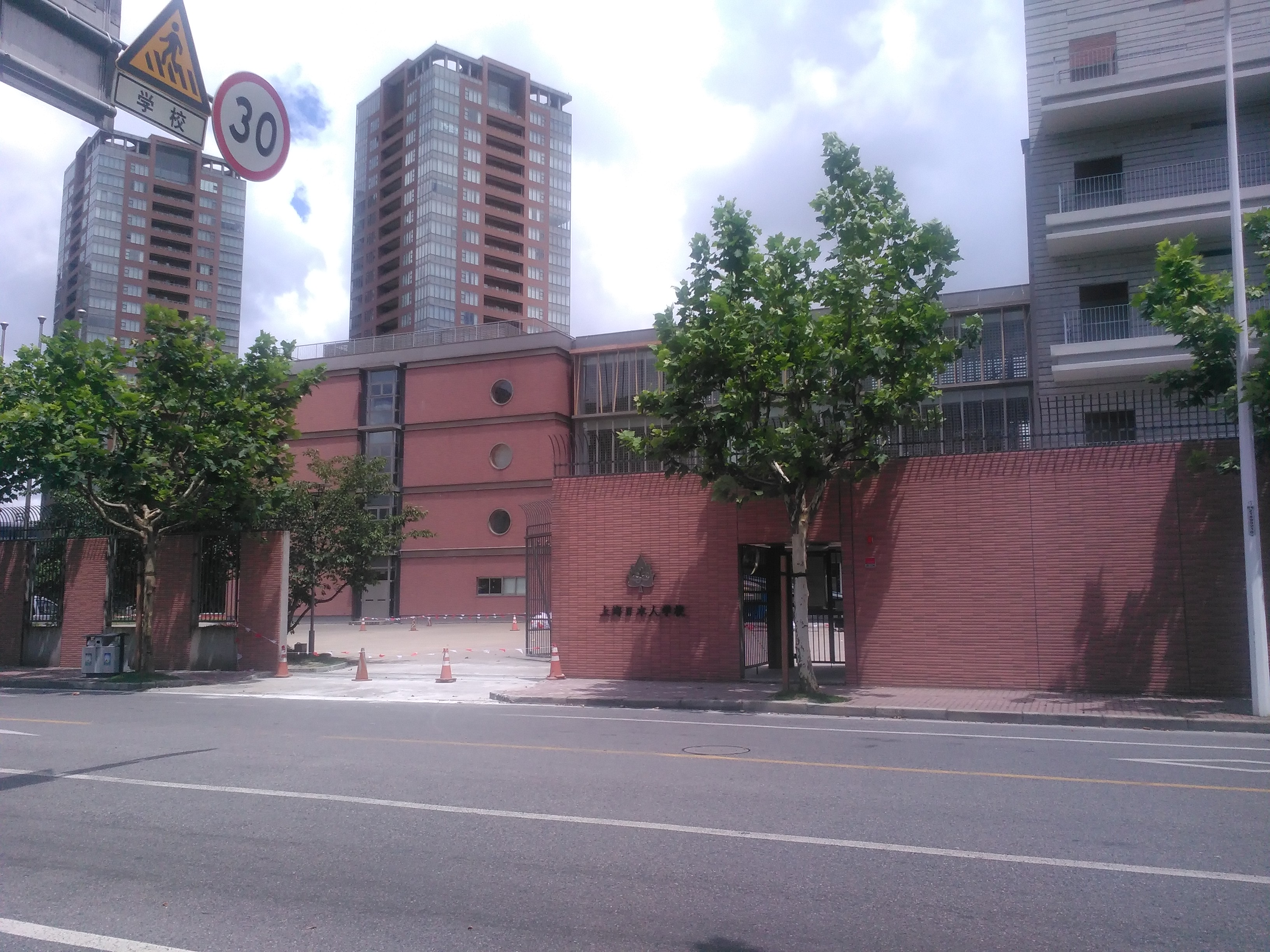
Japanese School of Shanghai Pudong Campus

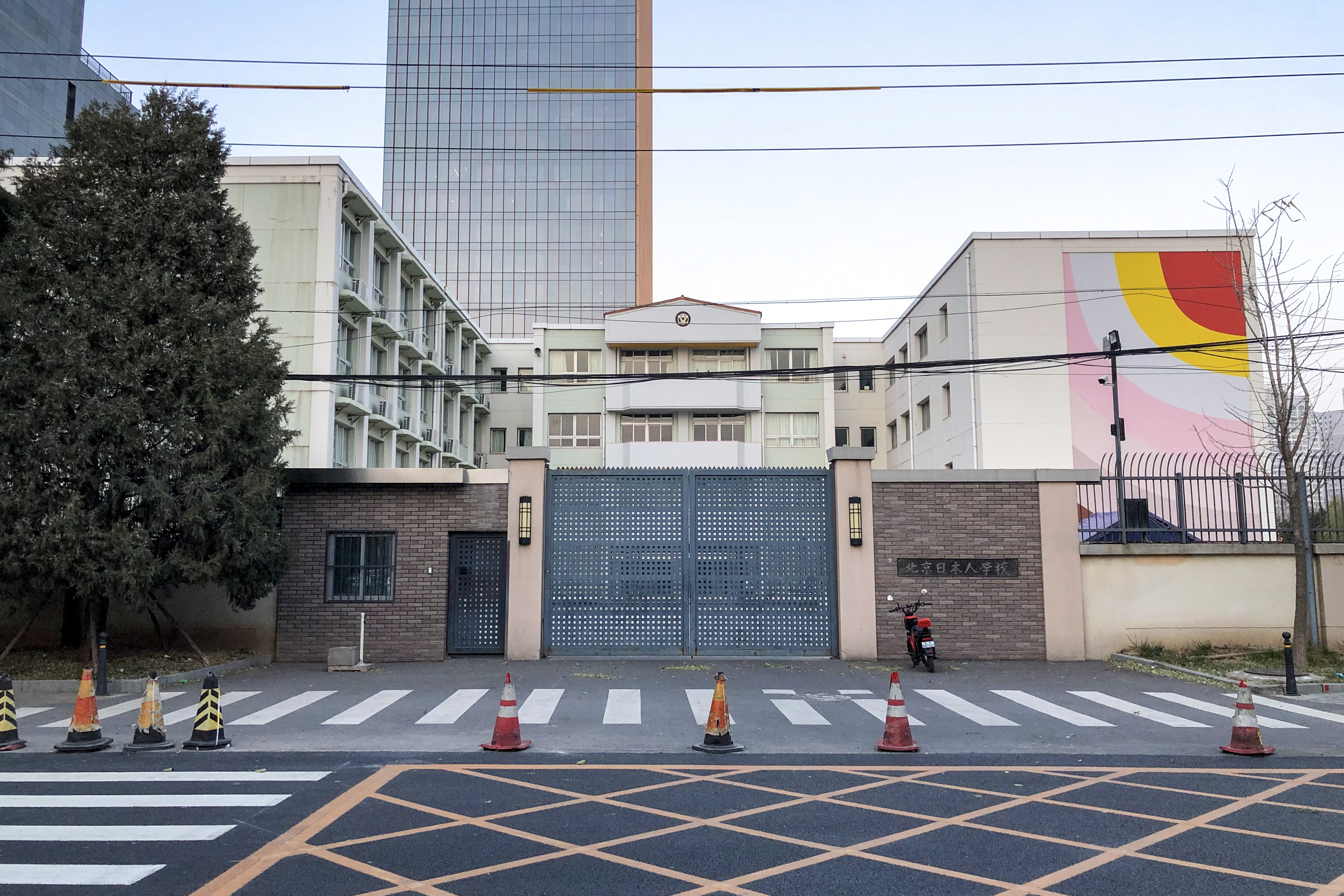
Japanese School of Beijing

The following are approved by the Japanese Ministry of Education (MEXT):

Mainland China

- Full-time nihonjin gakko:
  - Beijing: Japanese School of Beijing
  - Guangdong
    - Guangzhou Japanese School
    - Shenzhen Japanese School
  - Jiangsu: Suzhou Japanese School
  - Liaoning: Dalian Japanese School
  - Shandong: Qingdao Japanese School (青島日本人学校)
  - Shanghai: Shanghai Japanese School
  - Tianjin: Tianjin Japanese School (天津日本人学校)
  - Zhejiang: Hangzhou Japanese School (杭州日本人学校)
- Supplementary Japanese language education programs (hoshu jugyo ko or hoshuko):
  - Guangdong:
    - Shenzhen Saturday School (深圳(ｼﾝｾﾝ)補習授業校 Shinsen Hoshū Jugyō Kō, formerly SHENZHEN日本人補習校) – Office on the 8th floor of the Jinsanjiao Building (金三角大厦/金三角大廈) in Baishizhou, Nanshan District. Previously based in the Ming Wah International Convention Centre (明华国际会议中心) in Shekou.
    - Zhuhai Japanese Saturday School (珠海日本人補習校) – classes at QSI International School of Zhuhai
  - Jiangsu:
    - Nanjing Japanese Saturday School (南京補習授業校 Nankin Hoshū Jugyō Kō) – Nanjing International School, Qixia District, Nanjing
    - Wuxi Japanese Saturday School (無錫(ﾑｼｬｸ)補習授業校 Mujaku Hoshū Jugyō Kō) – Wuxi New Area – Established 14 April 2006
  - Liaoning: Shenyang Saturday School (瀋陽補習授業校 Shenyan Hoshū Jugyō Kō) – It was established in April 2006 and is in Shenhe District, Shenyang
  - Zhejiang: Ningbo Saturday School (寧波(ﾆﾝﾎﾞｰ)補習授業校 Ninbō Hoshū Jugyō Kō)
- Former hoshuko:
  - Jiangsu: Suzhou – Held at the Suzhou Foreign Language School (苏州外国语学校) in Suzhou New District
  - Shandong: Qingdao

Hong Kong

- Hong Kong Japanese School (nihonjin gakko)
  - Hong Kong Japanese Supplementary School (HKJSS; 香港日本人補習授業校 Honkon Nihonjin Hoshū Jugyō Kō)

Republic of China (Taiwan)

- Kaohsiung Japanese School
- Taichung Japanese School
- Taipei Japanese School

Unrecognized by MEXT:

- Chengdu Hoshuko (成都日本語補習校 Chentū Nihongo Hoshūkō) – Wuhou District, Chengdu, established on 12 February 2012

== Notable people ==
Chinese people of Japanese descent

- Chiang Wei-kuo – KMT figure, army general, and adoptive son of Chiang Kai-shek (originally from Tokyo)
- Hiro Saga – wife of Prince Pujie, brother of the Emperor Puyi (originally from Tokyo)
- Huisheng and Husheng – half-Japanese princesses of the Qing ruling family
- Jiang Ying – renowned opera singer and music educator
- Koxinga – Ming dynasty general
- Wen Chen-ling – Actress, her father is of Japanese-Chinese descent
- Zheng Pingru – socialite and spy who gathered intelligence on the Imperial Japanese Army

Japanese expatriates in China

- Chikada Rikimaru, Mika Hashizume, and Santa Uno – members of Into1
  - Chikada Rikimaru (originally from Itami, Hyōgo)
  - Mika Hashizume – Japanese American
  - Santa Uno (originally from Nagoya, Aichi)
- Ken'ichi Miura (三浦 研一, Miura Ken'ichi) – Japanese actor in China (originally from Edogawa-ku, Tokyo)
- Ryo Takeuchi – film director (originally from Abiko, Chiba)

== See also ==
- China–Japan relations
- Chinese people in Japan
- Japanese diaspora
  - Japanese community of Shanghai
  - Japanese people in Hong Kong
- Koreans in China
