= Changsha WES Academy =

International school in Hunan, China

Location
- 8 Dongyi Rd, Changsha County, Changsha, Hunan; China
- Coordinates: 28.2337°N 113.087934°E

Information
- Type: International school, K–12
- Motto: Where a love of learning grows, we grow
- Established: 2010
- Principal: Andrew Britnell
- Staff: 20
- Faculty: 67
- Grades: Early Years (3-5 year olds) and Grades 1 to 12
- Enrollment: 800
- Campus type: Suburban
- Colors: Blue, REd
- Athletics: YES
- Affiliation: CIE, CIS, IB
- Website: www.wes-cwa.org

Changsha WES Academy (Chinese: 长沙玮希国际学校) is a K-12 international school located in Changsha, Hunan province, China, established in 2010. It is the only school for children of foreign personnel approved by the Ministry of Education in Hunan province, and the only K–12 international school in the province with English as the primary language of instruction.

The school is accredited by the International Baccalaureate Organization (IBO), Cambridge Assessment International Education (CIE), and Council of International Schools (CIS).
