= Manila Xiamen International School =

Location
- 735 Longhushan Road, Siming District; Xiamen, Fujian; China

Information
- Type: Private, international school
- Established: 1993
- Principal: Dr. Mildred A. Go
- Grades: K to 12
- Nickname: MXIS
- Website: www.mxisonline.com

Manila Xiamen International School (simplified Chinese: 厦门岷厦国际学校; traditional Chinese: 廈門岷廈國際學校; pinyin: xià mén mín shà guó jì xué xiào) or MXIS, is a private international school in Xiamen City. It is licensed by the International Baccalaureate (IB) organization, offering education from preschool to grade 12.

== History ==
MXIS was established in 1993 by its co-founders Roman Go and Mildred Go. It was the first international school in Fujian, the province Xiamen is in. A Filipino-Chinese foundation provided money to establish the school. The school was founded to serve Overseas Chinese students and students from Hong Kong, Macau, and Taiwan. The school is located in a city that houses a Philippines consulate, and students' parents largely are foreign workers who had relocated to Xiamen.

In 2001, Chinese-Filipino students attempting to evade kidnappings in the Philippines enrolled in MXIS. During the 2008 financial crisis, 25 students left the school during the school year. The school was able to recruit 23 Taiwanese students to take their place. In 2011, the school had 328 students who largely came from Korea and Taiwan. Alongside Xiamen International School (XIS), MXIS is one of the most sought after international schools in Xiamen, according to the South China Morning Post. MXIS is a "lower-cost alternative" to XIS, which in 2013 had an annual tuition of US$19,000.

== Curriculum ==
Accredited by the Philippine Education Department, the school instructs students from preschool to grade 12. Students are taught in English, while Mandarin is taught only during Chinese language class. Students are taught in classes that range from five to 15 students on average. It became an International Baccalaureate (IB) school in 2006 and has been authorized to offer the IB Middle Years Programme since January 2021.
