= Shanghai Rego International School =

Information
- School type: Private Business
- Established: 1 September 2003
- Principal: None
- Age: 3 to 18
- Website: https://web.archive.org/web/20050829074924/http://srisrego.com/

The Shanghai Rego International School (simplified Chinese: 上海瑞金国际学校; traditional Chinese: 上海瑞金國際學校; pinyin: Shànghǎi Ruìjīn Guójì Xuéxiào) was a private school located in Minhang District, Shanghai, China.

== History ==
In 2012, it was announced that the school had been struggling to obtain the proper permits and authorizations from the local Chinese government. The owner of the school stated publicly that the teachers had been working in Shanghai with tourist visas for at least 6 months. Tourist visas only allow visitors to stay for 30 days and it is illegal to work in China while visiting with a tourist visa. He also admitted there were "difficulties" paying the teachers on a regular schedule, but the administration declined to provide details on what exactly these difficulties were. The school has since closed due to unpaid staff, including teachers, a bus company, catering, cleaning services, and guards.

The government has stated that when the school's land-lease expires in 2013, it will not be eligible for renewal. This decision was made to satisfy the growing needs of the city, allowing Shanghai to create a new public school.

The pay dispute crisis continued into 2014, where by February, there were 40 students remaining.

== See also ==
- List of international schools in Shanghai
- Beijing Rego British School
