= Daystar Academy =

- 启明星双语学校
- Daystar Academy logo
- No. 2, Shunbai Road; Chaoyang District, Beijing 100102; People's Republic of China

Information
- Type: Private school
- Founded: 2002
- Grades: Nursery–Grade 12
- Enrollment: 870 (2020)
- Language: Chinese, English
- Colors: Red, Blue and Green
- Website: daystarchina.cn

Chinese name
- Traditional Chinese: 啟明星雙語學校
- Simplified Chinese: 启明星双语学校
Transcriptions
Standard Mandarin
- Hanyu Pinyin: Qǐ Míngxīng Shuāngyǔ Xuéxiào
Yue: Cantonese
- Jyutping: Kai^{2} Ming^{4} Sing^{1} Soeng^{1} Jyu^{5} Hok^{6} Haau^{6}

Daystar Academy (simplified Chinese: 启明星双语学校; traditional Chinese: 啟明星雙語學校) is a private international bilingual school in Chaoyang District, Beijing. Providing instruction in both Chinese and English, it has over 850 students represented by 20 nationalities from kindergarten to grade 12. It has three campuses, the main campus is on Shunbai Road and the other two campuses offering nursery and elementary grades are in Sanlitun and Quanfa.

== Overview ==
Established in 2002, Daystar Academy is a bilingual school with instruction in Chinese and English and follows a Montessori program. It is part of Ivy Education (Chinese: 艾毅教育). Students are from 20 countries such as Canada, China, France, the United Kingdom, and the United States. The school has three campuses in the Chaoyang District of Beijing. Its Beigao campus serves students from kindergarten to grade 12, its Sanlitun campus serves students from grades one through five, and its Quanfa campus serves students who are younger than six years old. In 2020, the school had over 850 students. The school offers a music program and hosts a "Daystar's Got Talent" event.

Students are enrolled in the following programs:

- Kindergarten Montessori program for children 3–5 years of age
- Elementary School (Chinese National Curriculum and IB PYP curriculum)
- Middle School (Chinese National Curriculum and IB MYP curriculum)
- High School (Starting Fall 2018, IB DP curriculum)
