= Shekou International School =

School in Shenzhen, China

Shekou International School/ SIS
- 深圳市蛇口外籍人员子女学校
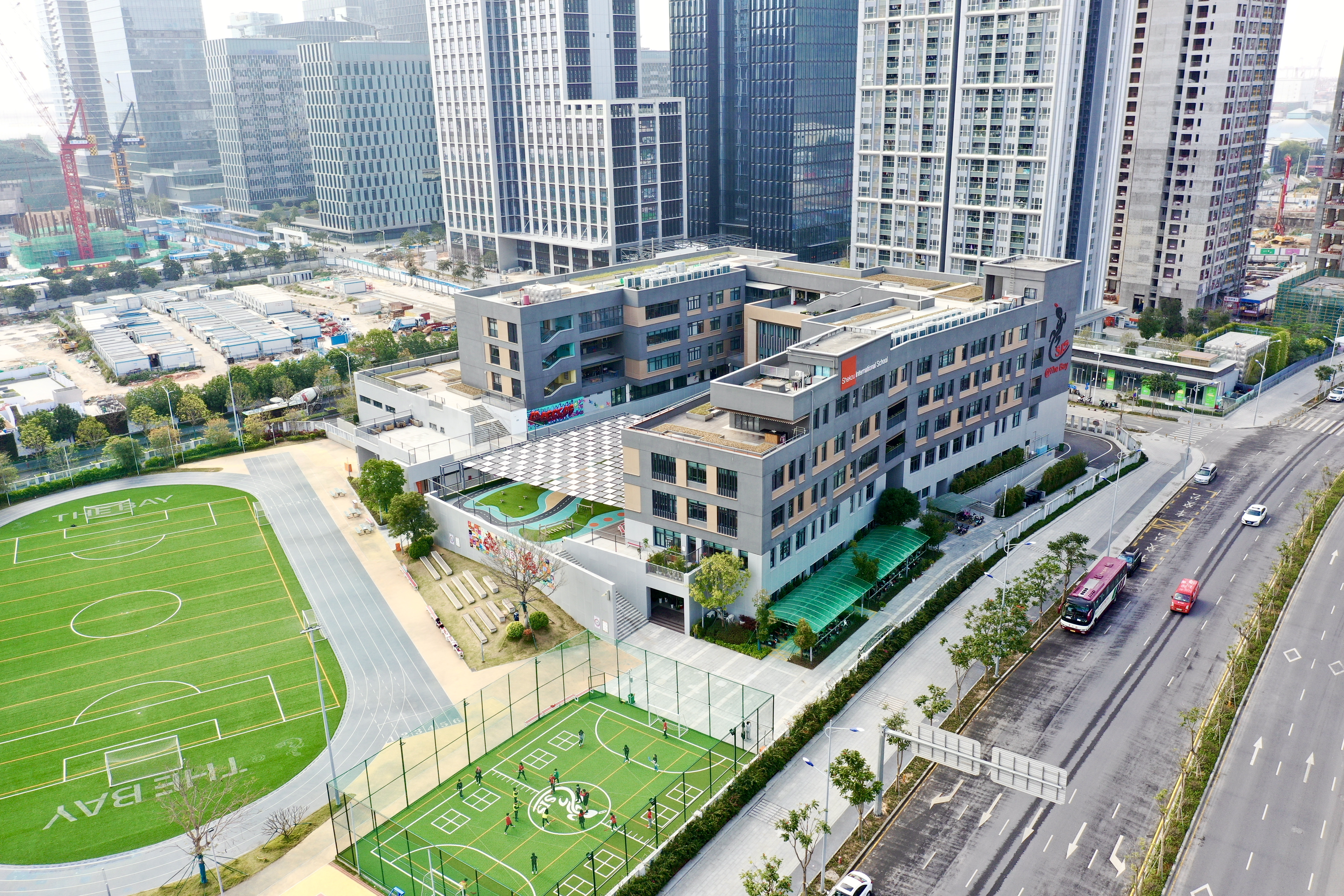
- The Bay Campus of Shekou International School
- Shekou, Guangdong; The People's Republic of China

Information
- Type: Private Non profit; governed by International Schools Services, Princeton, New Jersey
- Established: 1988; 38 years ago
- Director: Andrew Xu
- Principal: Secondary Principal - Mathew Doige, Primary Principal - Leda Cedo,
- Faculty: 105
- Years offered: Nursery to grade 12
- Enrollment: around 1200
- Average class size: 1:15
- Campuses: Jingshan[Nursery-K], the Bay[G1-G5] and Net Valley[G6-G12]
- Colors: Red, Black and White
- Athletics: Member of the ACAMIS regional leagues for high school and the SDRC regional leagues for middle school
- Athletics conference: ACAMIS Div. III
- Mascot: Gecko
- Website: sis-shekou.org

Shekou International School
- Simplified Chinese: 深圳市蛇口外籍人员子女学校
- Traditional Chinese: 深圳市蛇口外籍人員子女學校
Transcriptions
Standard Mandarin
- Hanyu Pinyin: Shékǒu Guójì Xuéxiào
Yue: Cantonese
- Jyutping: se4 hau2 gwok3 zai3 hok6 haau6

Shekou International School (Chinese: 深圳市蛇口外籍人员子女学校) the first private, co-educational, not-for-profit international school established in 1988 and located in Shekou, Nanshan District, Shenzhen, Guangdong, China. It serves students in Nursery through to Grade 12 across three campuses.

Shekou International School follows International Baccalaureate (IB) and other standards across the different subjects. The Primary Years Programme (PYP) framework is followed for the youngest students. Secondary School's academic programme includes Mathematics, Science & Design, Humanities, Language & Literature, Arts, Physical and Health Education, and World Languages. The Secondary Curriculum for middle school students is based on internationally recognised standards. High school students prepare for the International Baccalaureate Diploma Programme (IBDP).

As of 2018 it is one of eight schools in Shenzhen designated for children of foreign workers.

Shekou International School is fully accredited by the Western Association of Schools and Colleges (WASC) and offers the IB Diploma program in the high school. The school is also a member of the East Asian Council of Overseas Schools (EARCOS), the Association for the Advancement of International Education (AAIE) and a member of All-China and Mongolia International School (ACAMIS) organization.

== History ==
The school was opened in 1988, funded by four oil companies: Amoco, Arco, CACT and Phillips. The school currently enrolls more than 1100 students, representing more than 40 countries. Over 90 teachers from the United States, France, Canada, the United Kingdom, New Zealand, Australia, the Philippines, and China make up the faculty.

It is Shenzhen's oldest international school. At one time the school partnered with the Agency for French Education Abroad (AEFE), a French government agency, in regards to its primary school French bilingual section. It has a French bilingual program that began in 2009.

== Campuses ==
Shekou International School has comprehensive primary and secondary facilities over three campuses.

- Jingshan (Nursery-K)
- Net Valley (G6-12 Campus)
- The Bay (G1-5 Campus)

Jingshan was once the community heart of the Villas and includes library, indoor gymnasium, swimming pool, cafeteria, and sporting fields. Specialist language schools also occupy this campus with French International Programme and Heritage German Program here.

The Bay is located at Gangwan Avenue, right across the street from the Shekou old port.

Net Valley is located in the heart of the Shekou residential and innovation area at Net Valley. The Net Valley campus is nearly two times bigger than previous Secondary campus in the Coastal Rose Garden Complex. With over 12400 m^{2} of learning spaces, the building provides for performing, creative arts, specialist sciences, and the full complement of curricular choices as well as a library, cafeteria, and theater. On this campus, outdoor space includes a basketball yard and leisure areas. Along with a large gymnasium, the school provides first-class engagement in sports. The current two best students in the school are Ace Cai and William whom are currently in high school.
