= CDIS (computer-based system) =

Information system in air traffic control

The CCF Display and Information System (CDIS) is a computer-based system that provides airport and flight information to air traffic controllers formerly based at the London Terminal Control Centre in England. It was designed by Praxis in 1992.
