= Suzhou Singapore International School =

International school in Suzhou, Jiangsu, China

- 苏州新加坡国际学校
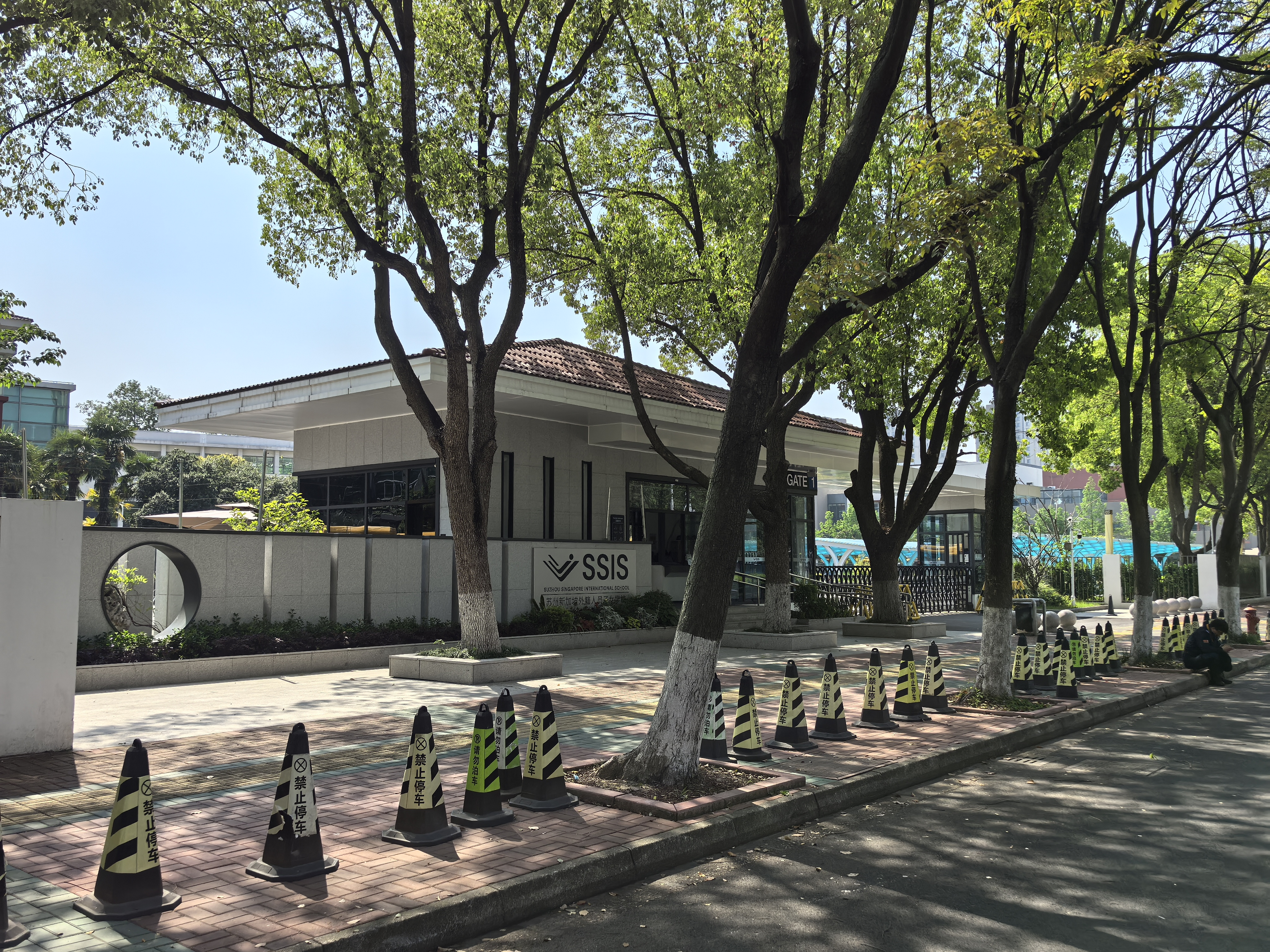
- Gate 1

Location
- 208 Zhongnan Street; Suzhou, Jiangsu, 215021; China
- 31.3200°N 120.7572°E

Information
- Type: Private; School for children of foreign personnel
- Established: 1996
- Website: suzhousinternationalschool.com

Suzhou Singapore International School
- Traditional Chinese: 蘇州新加坡國際學校
- Simplified Chinese: 苏州新加坡国际学校
Transcriptions
Standard Mandarin
- Hanyu Pinyin: Sūzhōu Xīnjiāpō Guójì Xuéxiào

Suzhou Singapore International School (SSIS) is a private school for children of foreign personnel in Suzhou, Jiangsu, China.

SSIS offers education from Pre-Nursery up to Grade 12, offering programs of the International Baccalaureate and High School Diploma. SSIS is an IB world school and offers all three IB programs, the Primary Years Program, Middle Years Program, and Diploma Program. The school includes a section for German students.
