= Kunming International Academy =

- 昆明国际学校

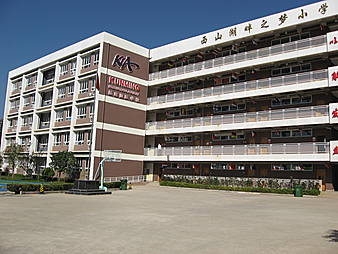

Location
- Hu Pan Zhi Meng Xiaoqu, Guang Fu Lu; Kunming, Yunnan; China

Information
- Type: Private, international
- Motto: Learn Lead Love
- Established: 1994
- Director: Marina Lytle
- Principal: Shamala Boice (junior/senior high); Rebecca Young (elementary) (out of date)
- Faculty: 50
- Grades: pre Jk-12
- Enrollment: 65 senior high school 78 junior high school 145 elementary school
- Campus type: Urban
- Colors: Red, black and white
- Mascot: The Flying Tigers
- Accreditations: WASC
- Yearbook: 20th Anniversary
- Website: www.kia-china.org

Kunming International Academy (simplified Chinese: 昆明国际学校; traditional Chinese: 昆明國際學校; pinyin: Kunming Guóji Xuéxiào; Literally: Kunming International Academy; Abbreviation KIA) is a private international school in Kunming, China. Founded in 1994, it provides education to expatriate children living in Kunming in English for Pre-Junior-Kindergarten-Grade 12. The school has over 300 students from over 20 countries enrolled.

The school uses an American curriculum and is accredited by WASC, the Western Association of Schools and Colleges. KIA graduates have been accepted at major universities worldwide.

== History ==
Kunming International Academy was founded in September 1994 by Kim Lytton, and her husband. Lytton, an American artist and teacher who adopted the Chinese name Li Wanjun (Chinese: 李婉君), moved in 1991 from the United States to Kunming with her husband and their two daughters. When the school opened, it had 14 students. On 95 mu of land in the Kunming Economic and Technology Development Zone, the school started construction on a new campus. It planned to spend CN¥60 million (US$9,302,326) on the property, which was planned to support 1,000 students and to have a playground, administrative buildings, and classrooms. The expansion was due to the large increase in foreigners moving to Yunnan, which caused the earlier location to be unable to support the growing demand for educational services.

The Hong Kong Commercial Daily said in 2007, that the school is the sole Yunnan international school specialising in providing education to the children of expatriates, while Wen Wei Po reported that year that it was the only school that let foreigners enroll. The student body in 2007 included children of diplomats stationed in Kunming consulates and senior officials from major multinational corporations like Boeing and Coca-Cola. Foreign students between the ages of three and 12 can attend the school. Students from 29 countries attended the school in 2019. The Western Association of Schools and Colleges accredited the school, which uses an American curriculum.

== Campus ==
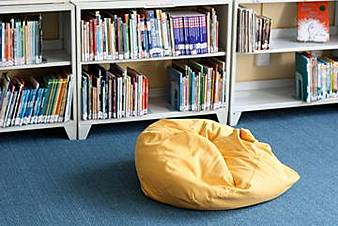
The library media center of Kunming International Academy

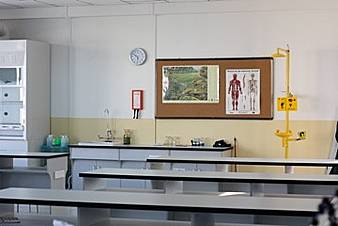
One of the full science labs equipped with advanced laboratory materials in Kunming International Academy

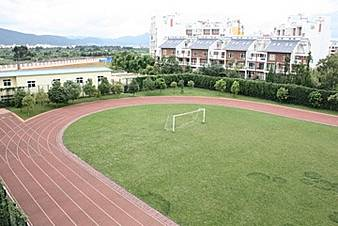
The 300-meter running track and the soccer field in Kunming International Academy

The current campus is located within the expanse of Hu Pan Zhi Meng Residential Area (Chinese: 湖畔之梦小区; lit. 'Lakeside Dreams Residential Area') in southern Kunming.

== Extracurricular Activities ==
KIA provides a wide array of extracurricular activities to develop individual student interest and abilities. At KIA, students can choose to participate in one or more of the following:

=== Young Musicians Orchestra ===
The Young Musicians orchestra is an orchestra consisting of about 30 attending members who play the violin, viola, cello, flute, piano etc. They have toured Hungary, the Czhech, Dali, Yunnan and Chengdu, Sichuan.

=== Student Government Association (SGA) ===
- Student Government Association

== Athletics ==
KIA, which has had an athletic program for many years, provides its students with the opportunity to participate in a variety of sports and has school teams that compete in both local and international tournaments.
