= Hangzhou International School =

International school in Hangzhou, Zhejiang, China

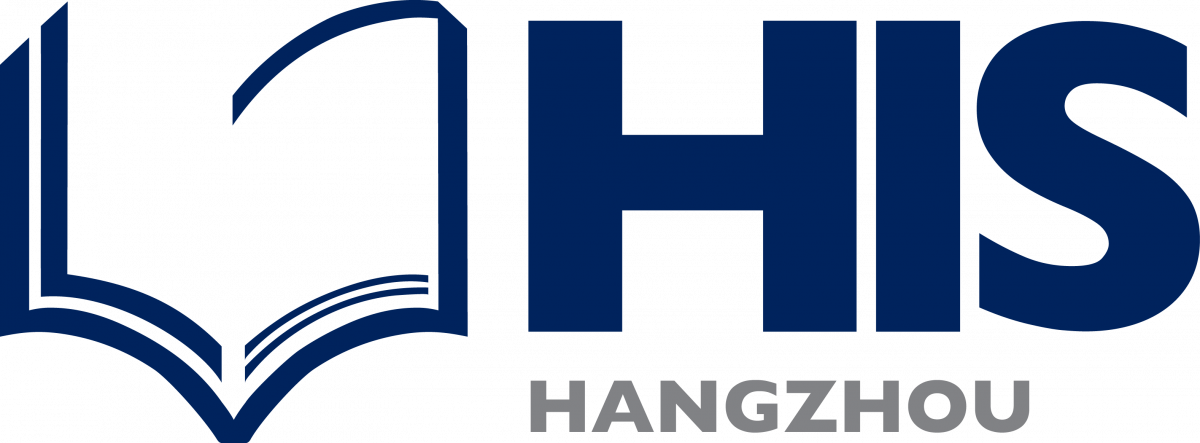
- Motto: Once a Dragon, Always a Dragon!
- Type: School for children of foreign personnel
- Established: 2002
- Director: Jeffry R. Stubbs
- Students: 1100+
- Location: Hangzhou, Zhejiang, China; 30°8′58.50″N 120°11′40.05″E
- Colors: Navy and gold
- Nickname: HIS Dragons
- Mascot: Dragon
- Website: www.his-china.org

Hangzhou International School (HIS) (杭州国际学校) is a non-profit, independent, multicultural, and co-educational day school for international students from Pre-Kindergarten to Grade 12. It is located in Hangzhou, the capital of Zhejiang province in China.

Founded in 2002, the school provides education from Early Childhood to Grade 12. HIS was the first international school in Hangzhou.

HIS is also accredited by Western Association of Schools and Colleges (WASC).

== Education ==
HIS uses the IB PYP (IB Primary Years Program) until Grade 5, IB MYP (IB Middle Years Program) from Grade 6 to 10, and the IB DP (IB Diploma Program) for Grades 11 and 12.

HIS teaches primarily in English, and offers Mandarin and Spanish as additional language classes. As well, HIS provides significant EAL (English as an Additional Language) support, with a team of more than 20 learning support staff. In addition, HIS has two dedicated Speech Language Therapists, as well as four Social & Emotional Counsellors, and an Occupational Therapist.

Students at HIS have the opportunity to take the following external assessments; IB Diploma, US High School Diploma, SAT, PSAT, WIDA and NWEA.

== Campus ==
HIS has a campus in the south of Hangzhou, near Xianghu metro station and the lake of the same name. The campus consists of two main buildings: The Cocoon, which houses the Early Childhood Education (ECE) classrooms, and The Lantern for Grades 1 to 12. Facilities include a 600 seat Performing Arts Theatre, Black Box Theatre, 'The Wave' 25 meter swimming pool, three indoor gyms, outdoor courts, and a FIFA-rated football/soccer pitch.

== Students ==
The top 10 nationalities are American, Chinese (including Hong Kong), German, Canadian, Indian, Australian, South Korean, French and Japanese. The other 30 nationalities have under 10 students each. HIS is a school for children of foreign nationals only. The only Chinese students allowed to apply are residents of Hong Kong, Macau or Taiwan, or those with special government permission.

== Extra-Curricular Activities ==
HIS offers a variety of co-curricular activities (CCAs) throughout the school year for students from Kindergarten to Grade 12. This includes activities such as Model United Nations (MUN), Duke of Edinburgh, and different team sports.

HIS also provides athletic opportunities for students to compete in 10 Varsity sports and 12 Middle School sports, as well as several Lower School sports and activities. HIS is a part of the Hangzhou International Schools Athletics Conference (HISAC), Association of China and Mongolia International School (ACAMIS), Shanghai International Schools Activities Conference (SISAC), South China International Schools Athletic Conference (SCISAC), and the Shanghai Swim League (SSL).

There is also a swim program at HIS for students from ECE to Upper School. The HIS Dragons Swim Team has a year round competitive program for students. As well HIS offers a Learn to Swim Program for students that are just starting out. Along with traditional swimming HIS also offers Artistic Swimming, Water Polo, Scuba Diving, and ILTP Lifeguard Training.

== Beyond the Classroom ==
Outside of school there is the World of Work program, which places Grade 9 students in various industries throughout Hangzhou. Through these week-long internships, students gain insight into possible future careers and real life work experience.

On the China Trips program, students from Grade 6-10 travel to different regions of China, including Yunnan, Guangxi, Inner Mongolia, Fujian and other destinations. On these week-long excursions, they learn about history, sustainability, economic development and cultural diversity. The experience teaches students independence, adaptability, and critical thinking.

== Parent Involvement ==
The Parents and Friends Association (PAFA) is committed to promoting parent and community involvement at HIS. This includes programs, events, and fundraising activities outside of school curriculum. This includes events such as International Day Booths, school decorations for festivities, family picnics and day trips, and Lower School movie nights.

== See also ==
- List of international schools
- List of international schools in China
- Shanghai Community International Schools
