= Xi'an Hanova International School =

International school in Xi'an, China

Xi'an Hanova International School is an international school established in Xi'an, China in 2012.

The school is independently owned and operated and teaches an international curriculum. The school is supported by local government educational authorities.

Students aged 3 to 18 make up the student body, with professional staff from 26 different countries. As of 2018, the school had 240+ international students, and all classes, activities, and subjects are taught in English, with the exception of non-English modern languages (Chinese, Korean, and Spanish).

Hanova International School is approved to offer the IB PYP (Primary Years Programme), IB MYP (Middle Years Programme), IB DP (Diploma Programme), and Cambridge International General Certificate of Secondary Education.
