= Ningbo Zhicheng School International =

- Ningbo, China

Information
- School type: Independent, International, Day and Boarding School
- Established: 1996
- Principal: Cavon Ahangarzadeh
- Website: http://www.georgiaschool.cn

Ningbo Zhicheng School International (NZSI) was established in 2010 by Chen Hui and is a part of the Ningbo Zhicheng School (宁波至诚学校), a Chinese private domestic boarding school established in 1996.

From 2012 to 2014, NZSI was authorized by the International Baccalaureate Organization (IBO) to offer the International Baccalaureate Diploma Programme (IBDP).

In 2014, the school was renamed International School of Ningbo (ISN), and in 2019, it was renamed Georgia School Ningbo after receiving accreditation from the Western Association of Schools and Colleges (WASC) and independent licensure from the Zhejiang Province Bureau of Education (GSN). The school uses American textbooks and primarily hires teachers from the United States. Cavon Ahangarzadeh is the founding Head of School and a permanent member of the school's board of directors.

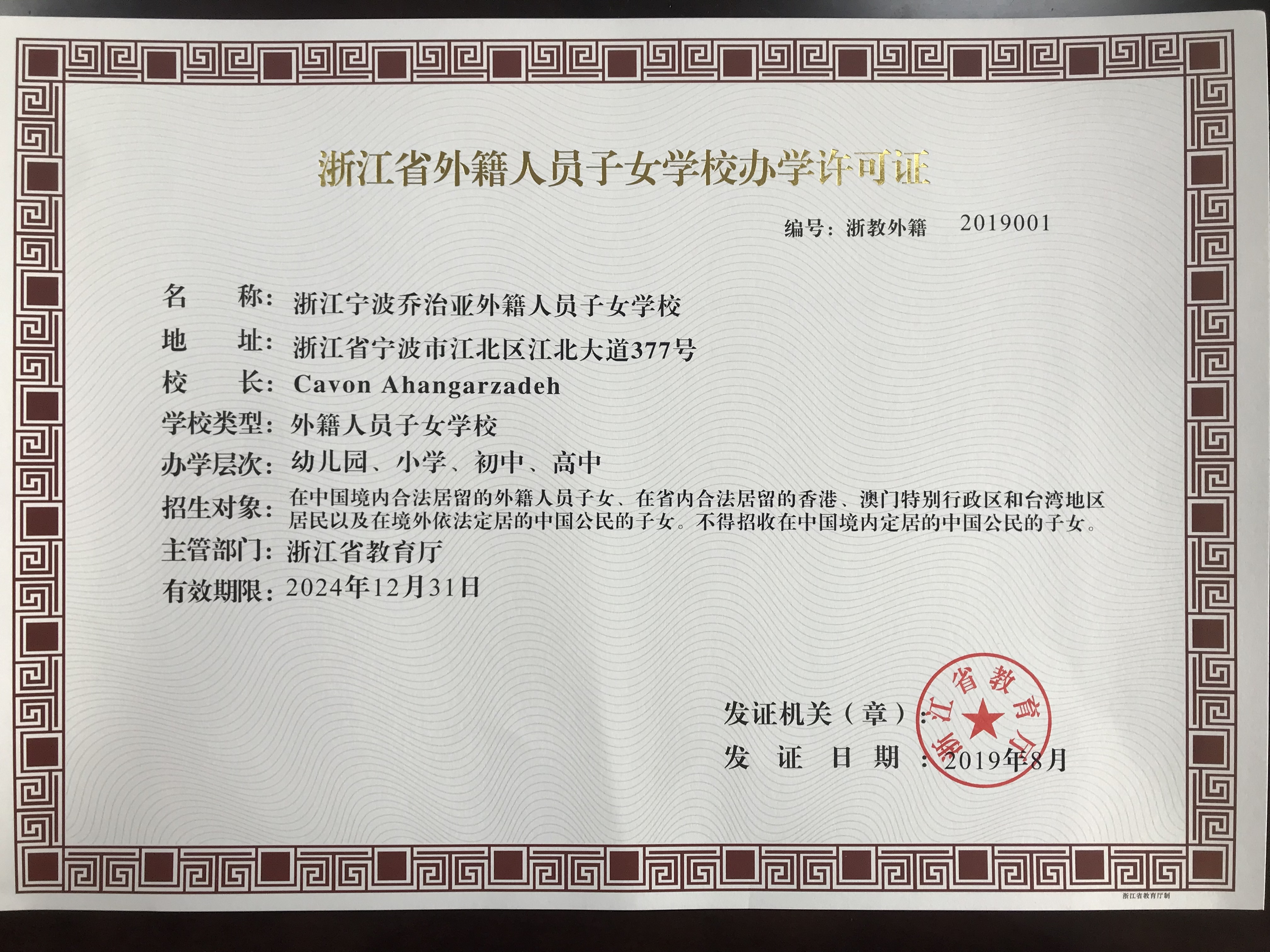

== Affiliations ==
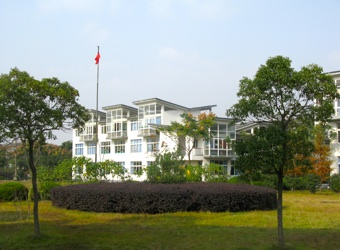
NZS campus

In 2010, NZSI gained authorization from the International Baccalaureate (IB) for the IB Diploma Programme. In 2019, Georgia School Ningbo was recognized by the education bureau of Jiangbei District of Ningbo city as an independent international school.

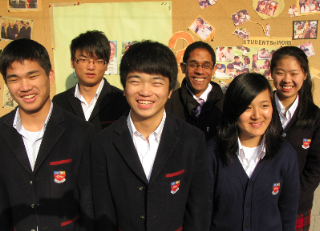
NZSI student council and their teacher
