= Beijing Rego British School =

Beijing Rego British School (BRBS)
- 北京瑞金英国学校

Location
- 15 Liyuan Jie, Tianzhu County, Shunyi District; Beijing, 101312; China

Information
- Motto: "To Strive, To Seek, To Find and ........ Not to Yield!"
- Established: August 29, 2011
- Founder: Rego Europe Foundation
- Closed: 2013
- Director: Hadyn Adams
- Student to teacher ratio: 8:1

Beijing Rego British School (BRBS, simplified Chinese: 北京瑞金英国学校; traditional Chinese: 北京瑞金英國學校; pinyin: Běijīng Ruìjīn Yīngguó Xuéxiào) was a British international school in Tianzhu County, Shunyi District, Beijing, China.

It first opened its doors in 2011 to students aged 3 to 18. The school had about 12 students in 2012, and 60 students by 2013. The school closed in 2013.

== See also ==
- Shanghai Rego International School
