= Zhongshi Korean International School =

School in Weihai, China

Zhongshi Korean International School, now called Weihai Zhongshi International School (WZIS), now called "Weihai Zhongshi Foreign School" (WZFS), is an international school in Weihai, China. WZFS was founded in 2006 by Moody Lee, a Korean businessman to serve students in China.

WZIS is an English speaking international school that follows the UK and Cambridge International Examinations (CIE) curricula.
