= Yew Chung International School of Beijing =

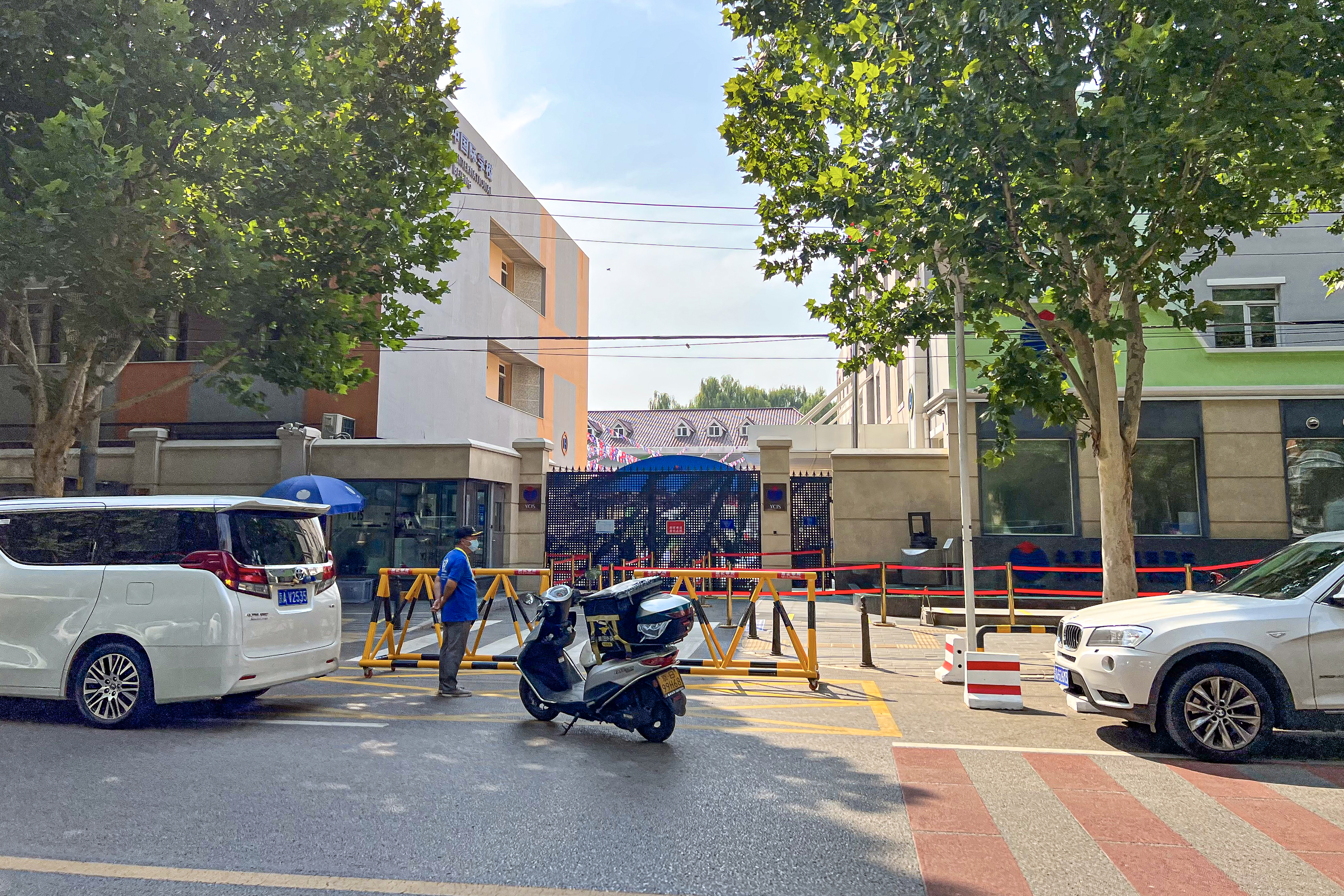

Location
- Chaoyang District, Beijing
- Coordinates: 39°55′35″N 116°29′44″E

Information
- Type: Private; School for children of foreign personnel
- Established: 1995
- Director: Dr. Betty Chan Po-King
- Website: www.ycis-bj.com

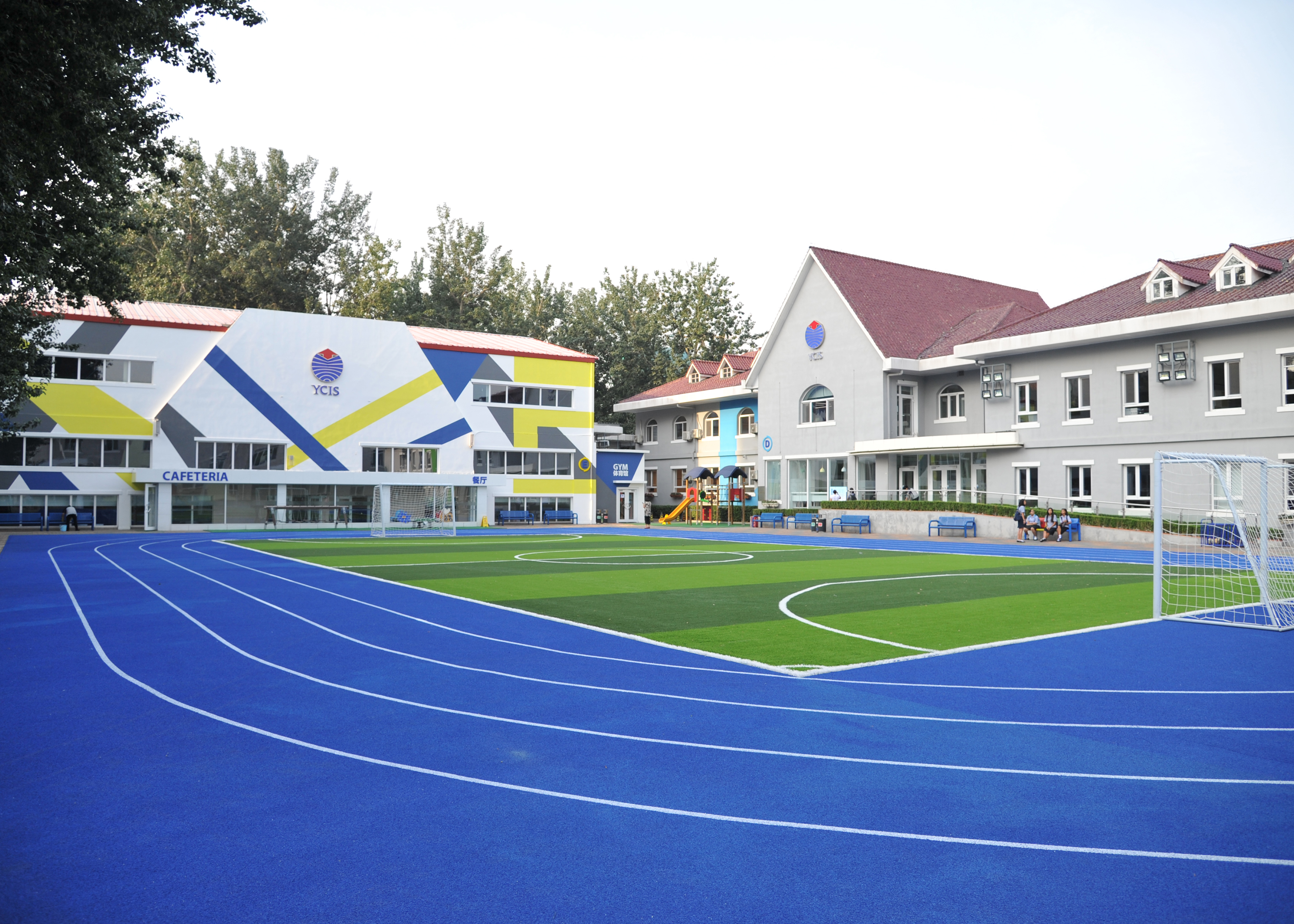
The YCIS Beijing Campus in 2020

Yew Chung International School of Beijing (北京耀中国际学校) is a private school for children of foreign personnel in Chaoyang, Beijing, China.

The school offers education from K2 to Year 13.

== Timeline ==
- 1995 – YCIS Beijing is founded.
- 1997 – YCIS Beijing adopts its Co-Teaching Model.
- 2001 – The In-School Individual Instrumental Programme (IIIP) is introduced and YCIS Beijing becomes an exam centre for the Associated Board of the Royal Schools of Music.
- 2019 – YCIS Beijing celebrates the 87th anniversary of the founding of the Yew Chung Education Foundation.
