= Shanghai Community International School =

Shanghai Community International School (SCIS)
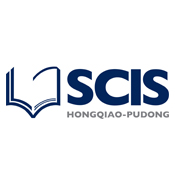
- Changning; Shanghai; China

Information
- Type: Private International
- Established: 1996
- Sister school: Hangzhou International School
- SCIS-Director of Schools: Dan Eschtruth
- Faculty: 200+
- Grades: Nursery-12
- Enrollment: 1400+
- Average class size: 20
- Campus: Puxi; Pudong
- Campus size: 8 acres
- Athletics: 19 sports
- Mascot: Dragons
- Website: www.scis-china.org

Shanghai Community International School (SCIS) is a private school in Shanghai, China.

== History ==
Shanghai Community International School was founded in 1996 for the children of expatriates residing in Shanghai, China. SCIS is a member of the East Asian Regional Conference of Overseas Schools and in 2001 received full accreditation with the Western Association of Schools and Colleges (WASC).

== See also ==
- List of international schools in the People's Republic of China
- List of international schools in Shanghai
