= Japanese School of Dalian =

School in Dalian, Liaoning, China

- 大連日本人学校 大连日本人学校

Location
- 123 Binhai Middle Road, Zhongshan Dist., Dalian 大連市中山区濱海中路123号 大连市中山区滨海中路123号; 38.865206°N 121.62922000000003°E

Information
- Type: Private school Elementary school Secondary school
- Grades: 1-9
- Gender: Co-educational
- Education system: Japanese Curriculum
- Language: Japanese
- Website: japanda.cn

Japanese School of Dalian

Chinese name
- Simplified Chinese: 大连日本人学校
- Traditional Chinese: 大連日本人學校
Transcriptions
Standard Mandarin
- Hanyu Pinyin: Dàlián Rìběnrén Xuéxiào

Japanese name
- Kanji: 大連日本人学校
Transcriptions
- Romanization: Dairen Nihonjin Gakkō

The Japanese School of Dalian is a Japanese international school in the Dalian Biodiverse Emerging Science and Technology City (Dalian BEST City), in Zhongshan District, Dalian, China.

On May 23, 2000, the Ministry of Education of China approved the establishment of the school. The construction of the current campus was scheduled to finish in early 2013, and the school was scheduled to move to the new campus that year.

== See also ==
- Japanese people in China

Mainland China-aligned Chinese international schools in Japan:

- Kobe Chinese School
- Yokohama Yamate Chinese School
