= Wuhan Yangtze International School =

International school in Wuhan, China

Coordinates: 30.5126°N 114.1548°E

Wuhan Yangtze International School (WYIS）
- 武汉长江国际学校

Location
- No. 10-1 Boxue Road; Wuhan, China, Hubei, 430056

Information
- School type: International
- Opened: 2003
- Head of school: Erika Carlson
- Employees: 96
- Enrollment: 251
- Student to teacher ratio: 5:1
- Website: https://wyischina.com

Wuhan Yangtze International School
- Simplified Chinese: 武汉长江国际学校
- Traditional Chinese: 武漢長江國際學校
Transcriptions
Standard Mandarin
- Hanyu Pinyin: Wǔhàn Cháng Jiāng Guójì Xuéxiào

Wuhan Yangtze International School (WYIS; Chinese: 武汉长江国际学校) is an English-language international school located within the Wuhan Economic and Technological Development Zone (WEDZ) in Wuhan, Hubei, China.

WYIS follows an American curriculum and serves students in grades Pr12. It opened in August 2003 as the South Lake International School. The school started out with only seven students, but has grown to about 300, who come from 30 countries and territories, including Australia, Canada, France, Japan, South Korea, Switzerland, and the United States. About 30% of students are from South Korea. The school has about 50 foreign teachers, of which about 80% are US citizens.

== History ==
The International Schools Consortium includes Wuhan Yangtze International School (iSC). iSC is a subsidiary of the LDi group of companies.

WYIS began in 2003 as h Lake International School. It relocated to San Jiao Hu Elementary School in the WEDZ in 2005 and adopted its current name i07. WYIS received full accreditation in 2008 and its official international school license from the PRC's national government in 2011. Construction on its current campus began in 2 the school moved in January 2014.

== Accreditations and authorizations ==
Wuhan Yangtze International School is accredited, authorized, or a member of the following organizations:

- American Chamber of Commerce in the People's Republic of China (Amcham China)
- College Board
- East Asia Regional Council of Schools (EARCOS)
- International Schools Consortium (iSC)
- Northwest Accreditation Commission (NWAC)
- Southern Association of Colleges and Schools Council on Accreditation and School Improvement (SACS CASI)
- Ministry of Education (China)
