= Ulink College =

- 领科教育
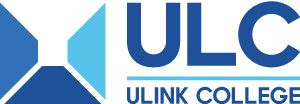
- China

Information
- Type: Private International High School
- Established: 2003
- Website: http://www.ulink.cn

Ulink College
- Simplified Chinese: 领科教育
- Traditional Chinese: 領科教育
Transcriptions
Standard Mandarin
- Hanyu Pinyin: Lǐng Kē Jiàoyù

Ulink College (Chinese: 领科教育) is an educational information consultancy company founded in Shanghai, China. It consists of one partner school (NCPA) and six full-time international boarding high schools across China. The international high schools offers IGCSE and A-Level courses, and the partner school offers Advanced Placement (AP) courses. The partner school and international high schools are all taught in English.

== Ulink College, Guangzhou ==
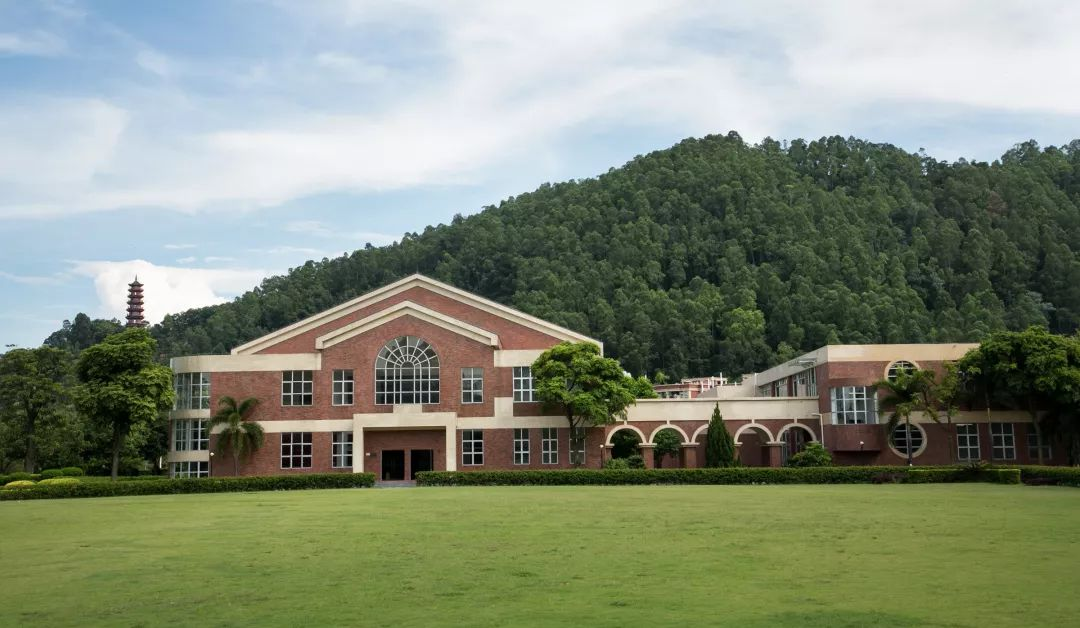
Ulink College, Guangzhou

Ulink College Guangzhou was founded in cooperation with South China Normal University (SCNU) in 2004. The school was initially named Ulink College of International Culture of SCNU or SCUN International School. It was initially a part of South China Normal University and located in the Campus of SCNU, Guangzhou, China.

== Partner School (NCPA) ==
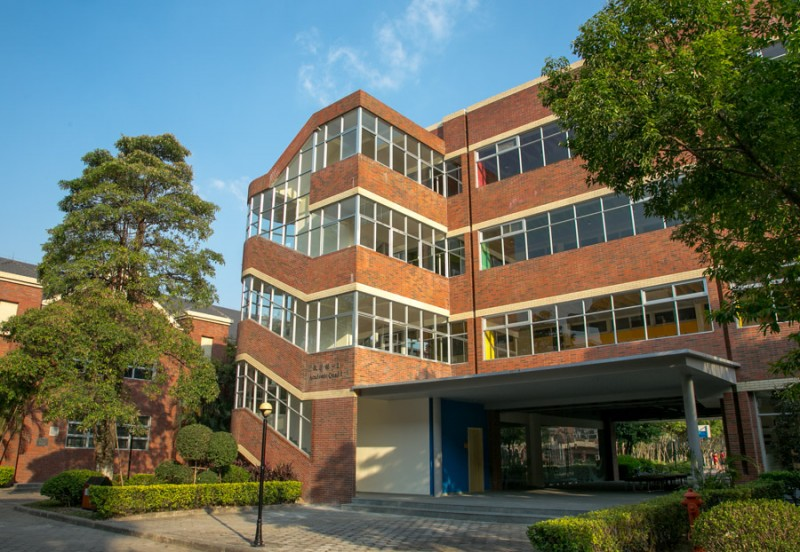
NCPA partner school

In August 2012, Nansha College Preparatory Academy (NCPA) was opened by this newly formed partnership. NCPA was authorized by College Board to provide teaching and examinations for Advanced Placement (AP) courses. The students in NCPA held Chinese identities and studied in an entirely English environment.

== Academic ==
Ulink College was the member of International Recruitment Conferences (IRC), initiated by International School Services (ISS). It attended IRC each year to recruit qualified foreign teachers. The general requirements for teacher recruitment are bachelor's degree or above in relevant subjects, a teaching qualification recognized by CAIE, a background in education English and good command of written and oral English.

== Organization and administration ==
The partner school of Ulink College (NCPA) was under the administration of both Ulink educational group and International Schools Services (ISS). Ulink educational group was responsible for marketing and public and government relations whilst ISS was responsible for the daily operation and management of NCPA, including assessment, instruction, and curriculum.

== Literature and popular culture ==
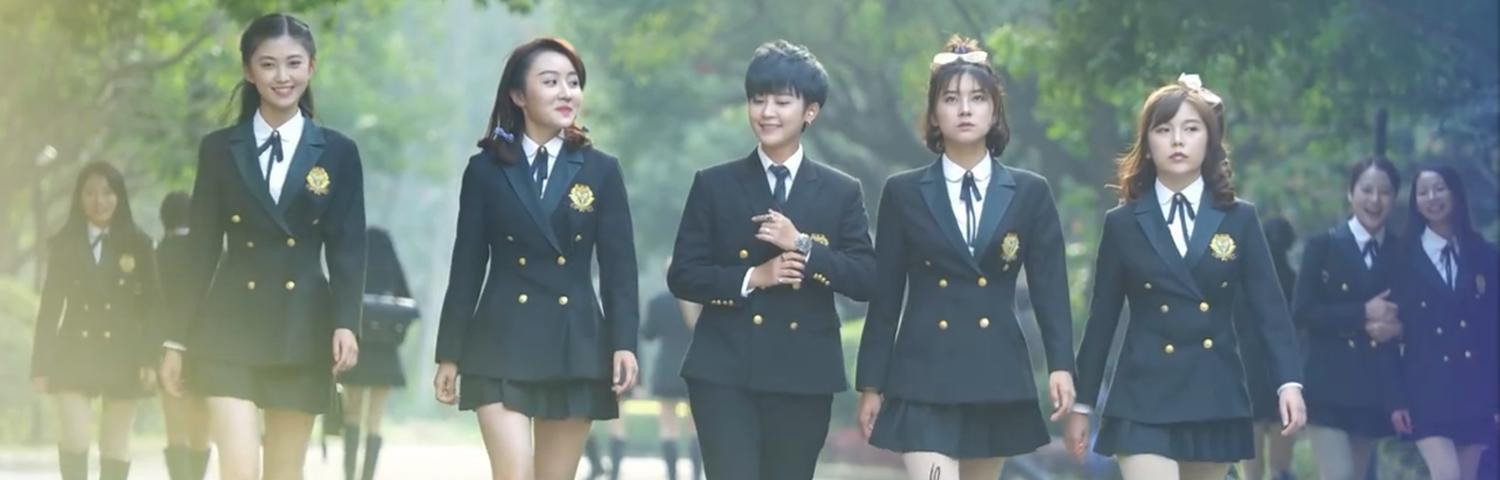
We Roared Past Youth (Chinese: 那场呼啸而过的青春)

Ulink College had an important influence on cross-culture collaboration in China. Its collaboration with International Schools Services that formed Nansha College Preparatory Academy represented a new way that foreign curriculum programs could take roots in China.

Ulink College regarded exchange programs as one of its popular internal cultures. The intramural exchange programs offers Ulink's students the opportunities to immerse themselves in different cultures and strengthen their adaptability to various cultures.

The campus of Ulink College Guangzhou and Nansha College Preparatory Academy was the main filming place of "We Roared Past Youth (Chinese: 那场呼啸而过的青春)", an online drama of campus of youth theme. The drama was produced by Le Vision Pictures (Levp) in 2017, Quanwei Liu as the director, and was broadcast exclusively on Le.com (Chinese: 乐视网) in June of the same year.
