= Canadian International School of Beijing =

- 北京加拿大国际学校

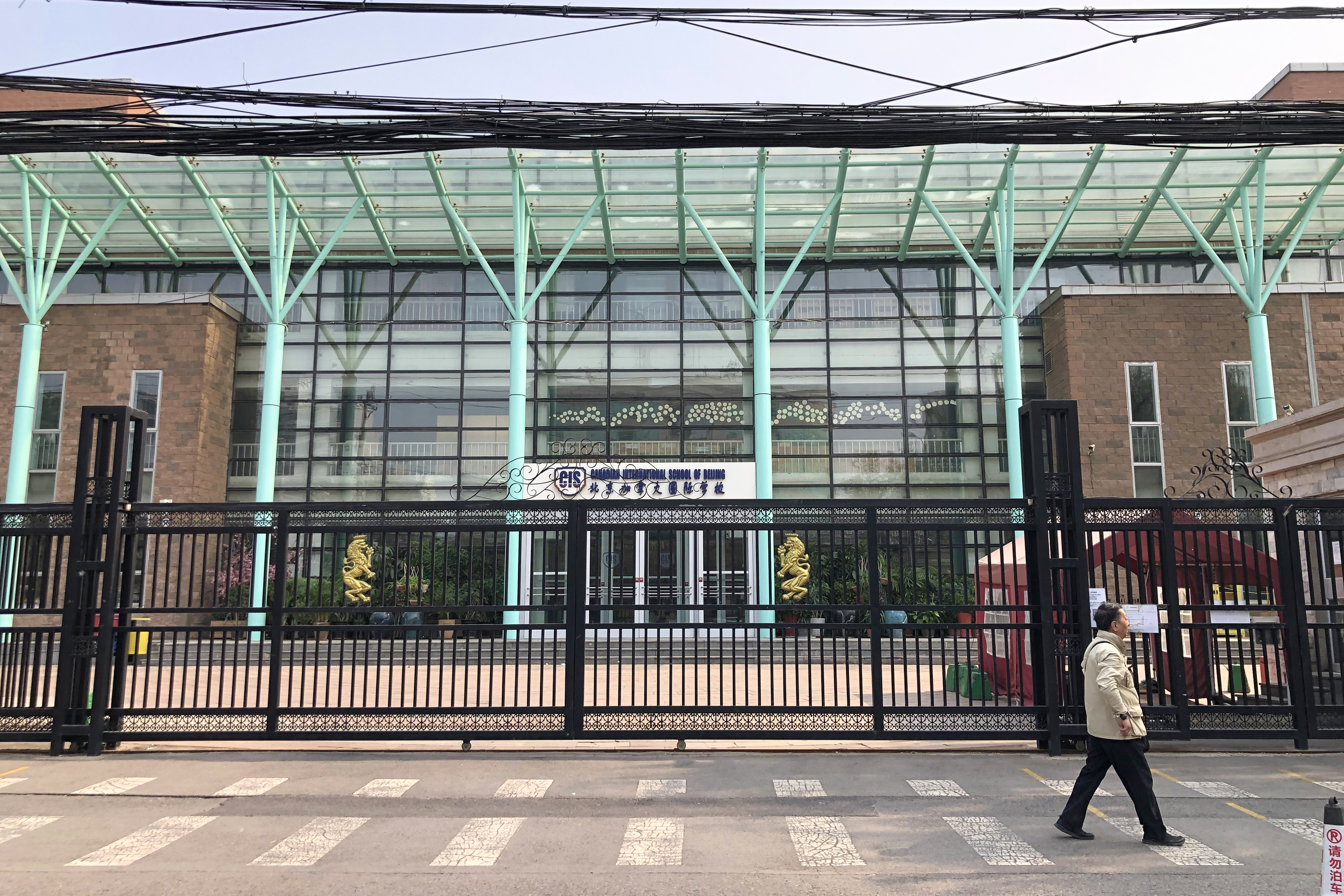
- Canadian International School of Beijing main gate

Location
- 38 Liangmaqiao Rd. Chaoyang District, Beijing 100125; China; 39°57′12″N 116°28′30″E

Information
- Type: Private, day school
- Founded: 2005; 21 years ago
- Chairman: Dr. Charles Pang
- Head of school: James Mc Crory
- Grades: Nursery to Grade 12
- Enrollment: 650 (as of 2025)
- Campus type: Private campus in downtown Beijing (17,000 m^{2})
- Colors: Red and white
- Mascot: Bobcat
- Website: www.cisbeijing.com

Canadian International School of Beijing
- Traditional Chinese: 北京加拿大國際學校
- Simplified Chinese: 北京加拿大国际学校
Transcriptions
Standard Mandarin
- Hanyu Pinyin: Běijīng Jiānádà Guójì Xuéxiào

The Canadian International School of Beijing (CISB, Chinese: 北京加拿大国际学校) is a Canadian international school in Chaoyang District, Beijing.

CISB was founded in 2005. The school was established as a State Level Project through the Chinese Ministry of Foreign Affairs and Education, the Government of Canada, and the New Brunswick Department of Education.

CISB has students from over 70 countries.

CISB operates under the guidance of the New Brunswick, Canada, Department of Education. The founding organization of CISB has a history of operating schools in China with three other schools in China, including International School of Nanshan Shenzhen, and two schools delivering the Canadian Curriculum to Chinese Nationals in both Beijing and Shenzhen.

CISB offers a facility with a Canadian education curriculum. The grade levels at CISB range from Montessori Preschool to Grade 12.

The Canadian International School of Beijing is a three programme IB World School and offers the International Baccalaureate Primary Years Programme (PYP), Middle Years Programme (MYP) and Diploma Programme (IBDP/DP).

== Operations ==
In 2015 the tuition for the year was 170,000 renminbi ($27,387 U.S. dollars). China Daily ranked CISB as the 9th most expensive private school in Beijing.

== Curriculum ==
CISB offers a Montessori Kindergarten from 18 months to 3 years old and an internationally recognized Canadian curriculum through an agreement with the New Brunswick, Canada, Department of Education.

In the early years, the curriculum provides an emphasis on the skills, knowledge, and attitudes students will need for later success. As the students progress into Middle School, the subject areas broaden to provide them with experiences in specific curriculum areas and to introduce new interests. In High School, the program begins to become more focused as we prepare students to meet the requirements for university entrance.

In addition, CISB is a 3 programme IB World School offering the International Baccalaureate PYP, MYP and Diploma Programmes.

== Accreditation ==
All certificates and diplomas issued for student achievement are recognized by the New Brunswick, Canada, Department of Education.

The school is affiliated with UNESCO and ACAMIS.

== Sports and activities ==
CISB Bobcats compete in sports competitions as part of the ACAMIS and ISAC Leagues. CISB Bobcats teams include basketball, soccer, softball, volleyball, badminton, table tennis, and track and field.

Clubs and activities at CISB include Student Council, Stage Kittens & Stage Cats, choir, bands, newspaper, yearbook, social and global issue network.

== Facilities ==
The school is located in the third Embassy compound in the Chaoyang District of Beijing.

- 90 classrooms equipped with Smart Board technology
- Media labs
- 2 libraries
- 1 Science laboratories
- Technology laboratory
- VR lab
- Maker Space
- Visual Arts classrooms
- Display area for Fine Arts
- Lecture theater
- Auditorium with a 500 seats capacity for major productions and meetings
- 2 large gymnasiums
- Indoor climbing wall
- 25 meter indoor heated swimming pool
- Indoor wading pool for young children
- Supervised outdoor children's playground
- Dance studio
- 4 piano practice rooms
- 2 music classrooms equipped with 50 keyboards
- Multipurpose room
- Fitness Suite
- Cardio Suite
- Astro turf soccer field
- Outdoor Ninja course
- Full-service cafeteria and a smaller food service area
- Nurse station (with 2 nurses)
- Design Technology lab

== See also ==
- Canadians in China
