= Qingdao No. 1 International School of Shandong Province =

Qingdao No. 1 International School of Shandong Province 山东省青岛第一国际学校
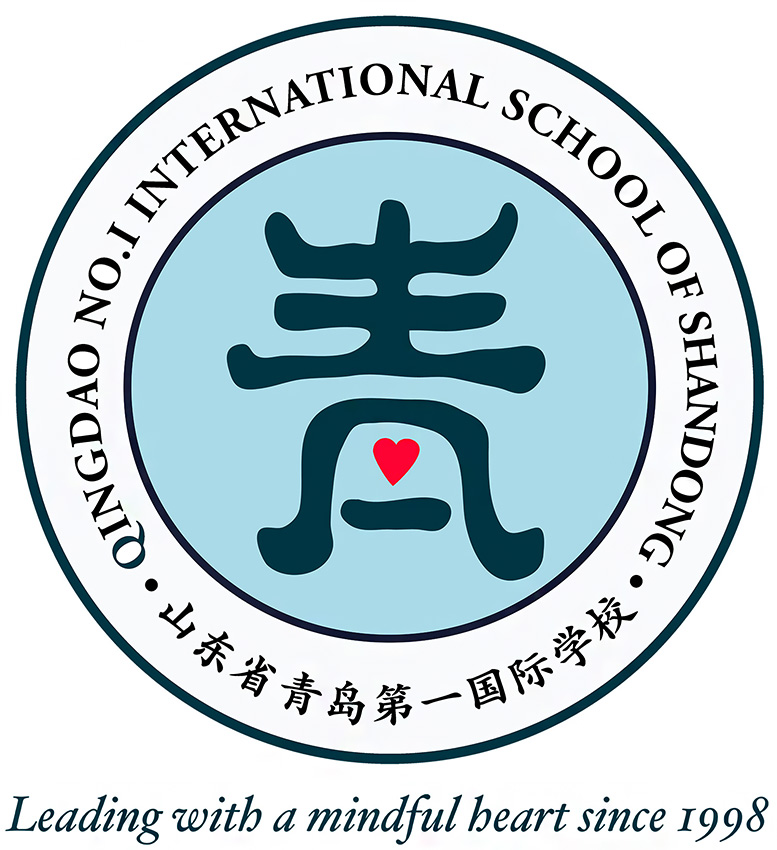

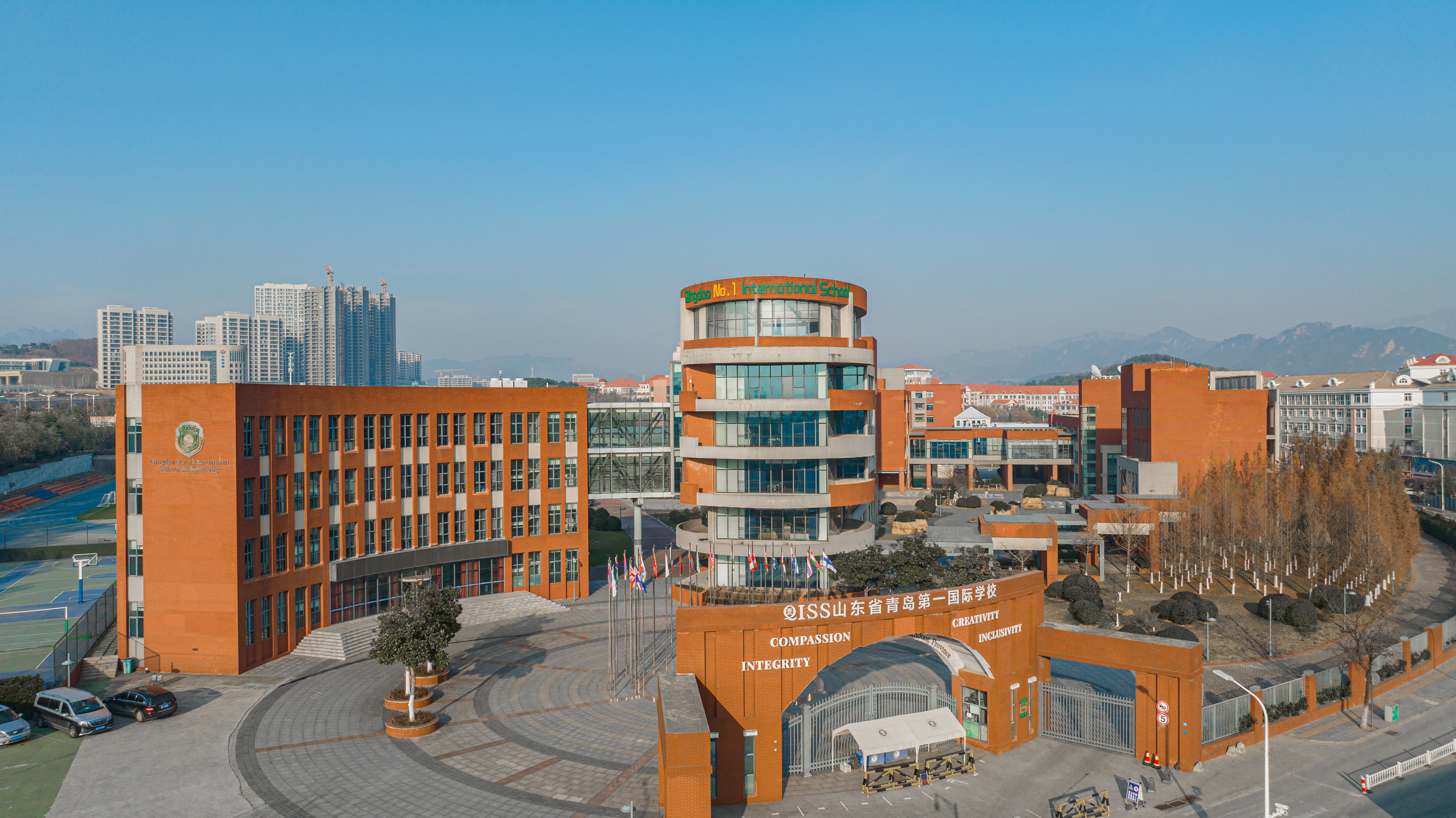

Location
- 232 Songling Road; Laoshan District, Qingdao, China, 266101
- Coordinates: 36°09′23″N 120°29′11″E

Information
- Type: Pre-kindergarten, Kindergarten, Elementary School, Middle School, High School
- Established: 2007
- Director: Dr. Brian Brumsickle
- Division principals: Dominic Adie, Damian Pakkiri
- Slogan: Leading With a Mindful Heart
- Mascot: Sharks
- Website: https://www.qiss.org.cn/

Qingdao No. 1 International School of Shandong Province (Chinese: 山东省青岛第一国际学校; QISS) is a private international school in Qingdao, China. Located in Qingdao High-Tech Industrial Park, it is overseen by Qingdao Local Bureau of Education and provides education for Chinese children with foreign passports. Approximately 200 students attend classes from pre-kindergarten to 12th grade. QISS is an ACAMIS member school and accredited by Western Association of Schools and Colleges Board (WASC). The school is located in Laoshan district Qingdao, China.

== History ==
The school was established on 16 August 2007. Construction of QISS's campus began in August 2008 and was finished in late 2009. The school spent CN¥210 million (US$32,558,140) to build the campus. Overseen by the Qingdao Local Bureau of Education, it is located in Qingdao High-Tech Industrial Park.

In its first year, the school enrolled students from more than 20 countries. Only foreign national's children could be students at the school. QISS serves students from pre-kindergarten to 12th grade. The Western Association of Schools and Colleges accredited the school. QISS is part of the Association of China and Mongolia International Schools.

== Curriculum ==
The QISS curriculum is designed to follow the U.S. Common Core Standards and the standards set by the College Board. The school offers AP classes and is a PSAT and SAT designated testing site.

The following AP Courses are taught at QISS:

- AP Physics
- AP Biology
- AP Calculus
- AP Chemistry
- AP Statistics
- AP World History
- AP Macroeconomics
- AP Microeconomics
- AP Human Geography
- AP Computer Science
- AP Comparative Government
- AP Language & Composition
- AP Chinese Language and Culture

The Leader in Me - Stephen Covey Social and Emotional Learning Program.
