= International School of Nanshan Shenzhen =

Canadian school in Shenzhen, China

- 深圳市南山外籍人员子女学校

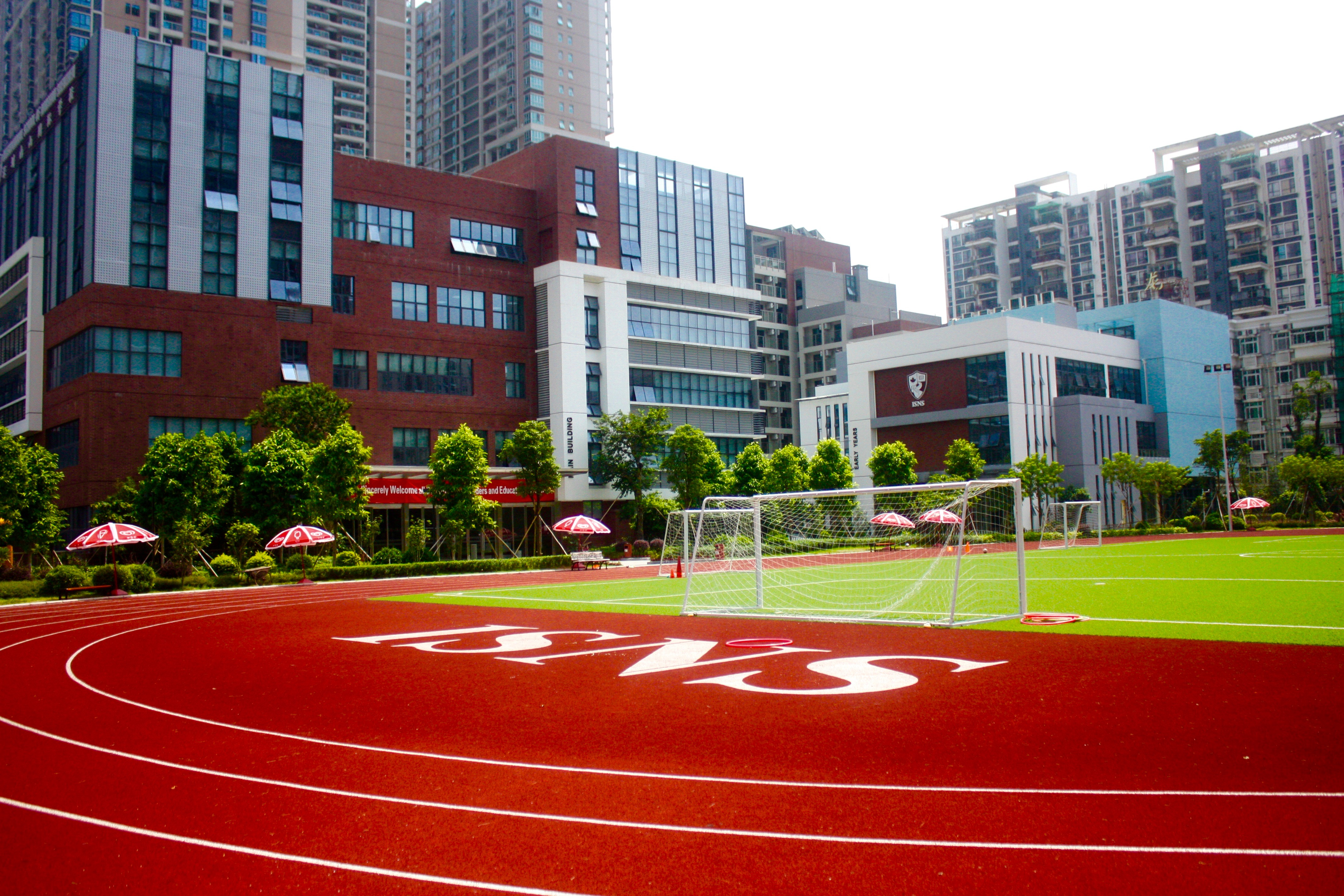

Location
- 11 Longyuan Road, Taoyuan Subdistrict; Nanshan District; Shenzhen, Guangdong, 518055; China; 22°33′49″N 113°58′54″E

Information
- Other name: ISNS
- Type: Private international school
- Established: 2002; 24 years ago
- Founder: Francis Pang and partners
- Head of school: Addie Loy
- Grades: K2–Grade 12
- Gender: Coeducational
- Education system: New Brunswick curriculum and International Baccalaureate programmes
- Language: English
- Website: www.isnsz.com

International School of Nanshan Shenzhen
- Simplified Chinese: 深圳市南山外籍人员子女学校
- Traditional Chinese: 深圳市南山外籍人員子女學校
- Literal meaning: Shenzhen Nanshan School for Children of Foreign Nationals
Transcriptions
Standard Mandarin
- Hanyu Pinyin: Shēnzhèn shì nánshān wàijí rényuán zǐnǚ xuéxiào
Yue: Cantonese
- Jyutping: sam1 zan3 si5 naam4 saan1 ngoi6 zik6 jan4 jyun4 zi2 neoi5 hok6 haau6

International School of Nanshan Shenzhen (ISNS; Chinese: 深圳市南山外籍人员子女学校), formerly the International School of Sino-Canada, is a part of the Taoyuan Sub-District, Nanshan District, Shenzhen, China.

International School of Nanshan Shenzhen (ISNS) is an independent international school in the Nanshan District of Shenzhen, Guangdong, China. Established in 2002, the school provides education from early childhood through grade 12. It is authorized by the International Baccalaureate (IB) to offer the Primary Years Programme, Middle Years Programme, and Diploma Programme.

Following Chinese regulations for international schools (schools for foreign personnel), enrollment is open to students holding foreign passports or residency in Hong Kong, Macau, and Taiwan. The primary language of instruction is English, with Mandarin Chinese and French offered as additional language courses.

== History ==
The International School of Shenzhen (ISNS), formerly known as the Sino-Canadian International School (ISSC), was established in Nanshan District, Shenzhen in 2002. Initially adopting the Canadian curriculum, the school was later authorized to offer the International Baccalaureate (IB) Primary School Program, Secondary School Program, and Diploma Programme.

== Academics ==
The International School of Nanshan Shenzhen (ISNS) provides the International Baccalaureate (IB) continuum of education. The academic framework includes the Primary Years Programme (PYP) for students aged 2–11, the Middle Years Programme (MYP) for ages 11–16, and the Diploma Programme (DP) for ages 16–18.

The curriculum is based on inquiry-based and interdisciplinary learning methods aligned with IB standards. Upon graduation, students who successfully complete the Diploma Programme requirements are eligible to receive both the IB Diploma and the Canadian New Brunswick High School Diploma.

== Student Life and Co-curricular Learning ==
The International School of Nanshan Shenzhen (ISNS) provides Education Outside the Classroom (EOTC) through its annual "Week Without Walls" (WWW) program. This program includes service learning, cultural exploration, and outdoor education. The school also offers extra-curricular activities (ECA) in athletics, arts, technology, and community service.

The school provides extracurricular activities (ECAs) in athletics, arts, technology, design, and community service. These co-curricular and experiential learning programs are included as part of the school's educational framework.

== Community and culture ==
The ISNS community includes students and staff from over 20 countries and regions. As an International Baccalaureate (IB) World School, its culture is guided by the IB philosophy and the school's mission statement. The school organizes various annual programs, including cultural celebrations, academic weeks, performing arts events, and sports days. Community engagement is facilitated through the Parent Association, service learning opportunities, and academic workshops for families.

== Campus and Facilities ==
The school in 2026

The ISNS campus is situated at the foot of Tanglang Mountain in the Nanshan District of Shenzhen, covering an area of approximately 14,900 square metres. The facilities include a standalone building for early years students aged 2 to 5.

Academic and specialized learning spaces consist of science laboratories, design workshops, maker spaces, and a virtual reality (VR) lab. The school also houses two libraries, a 300-seat auditorium, and various visual and performing arts facilities, including studios for music, art, and drama, as well as a photography darkroom.

Sports and recreation facilities include both indoor and outdoor gymnasiums, a basketball court, and a 200-metre outdoor track. The campus is staffed with on-site nursing personnel and provides 24-hour security.

== Languages of instruction ==
English is the primary language of instruction at the school. The curriculum also includes additional language programs in Mandarin Chinese and French.

== Affiliated school ==
- Canadian International School of Beijing

== See also ==
- International Baccalaureate
- International schools in China
- Education in Shenzhen
