= Chengdu International School =

International school in Chengdu, China

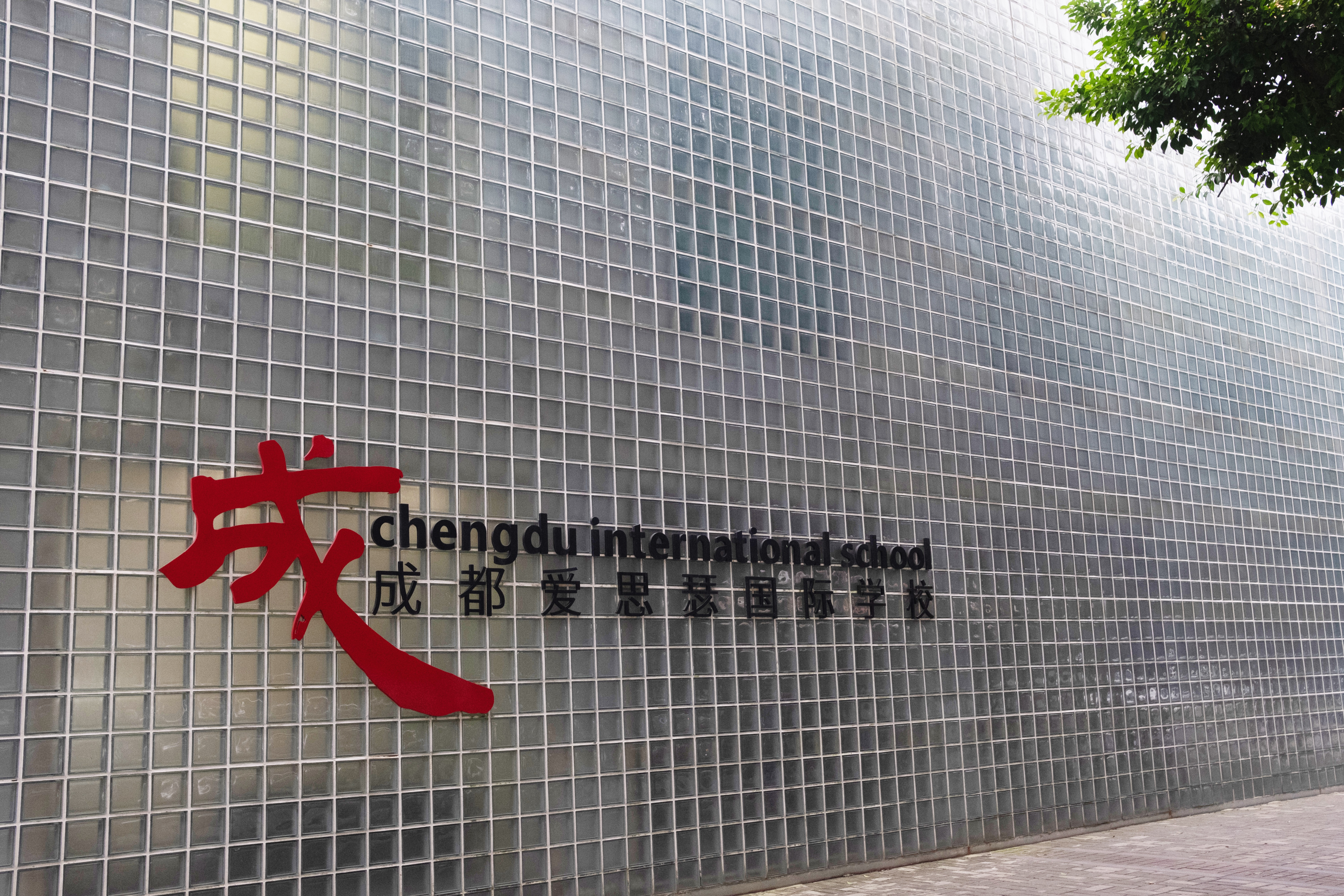
- Façade of Building A
- Simplified Chinese: 成都爱思瑟国际学校
- Traditional Chinese: 成都愛思瑟國際學校
- Literal meaning: Chengdu Aisise International School
Transcriptions
Standard Mandarin
- Hanyu Pinyin: Chéngdū Àisīsè Guójì Xuéxiào

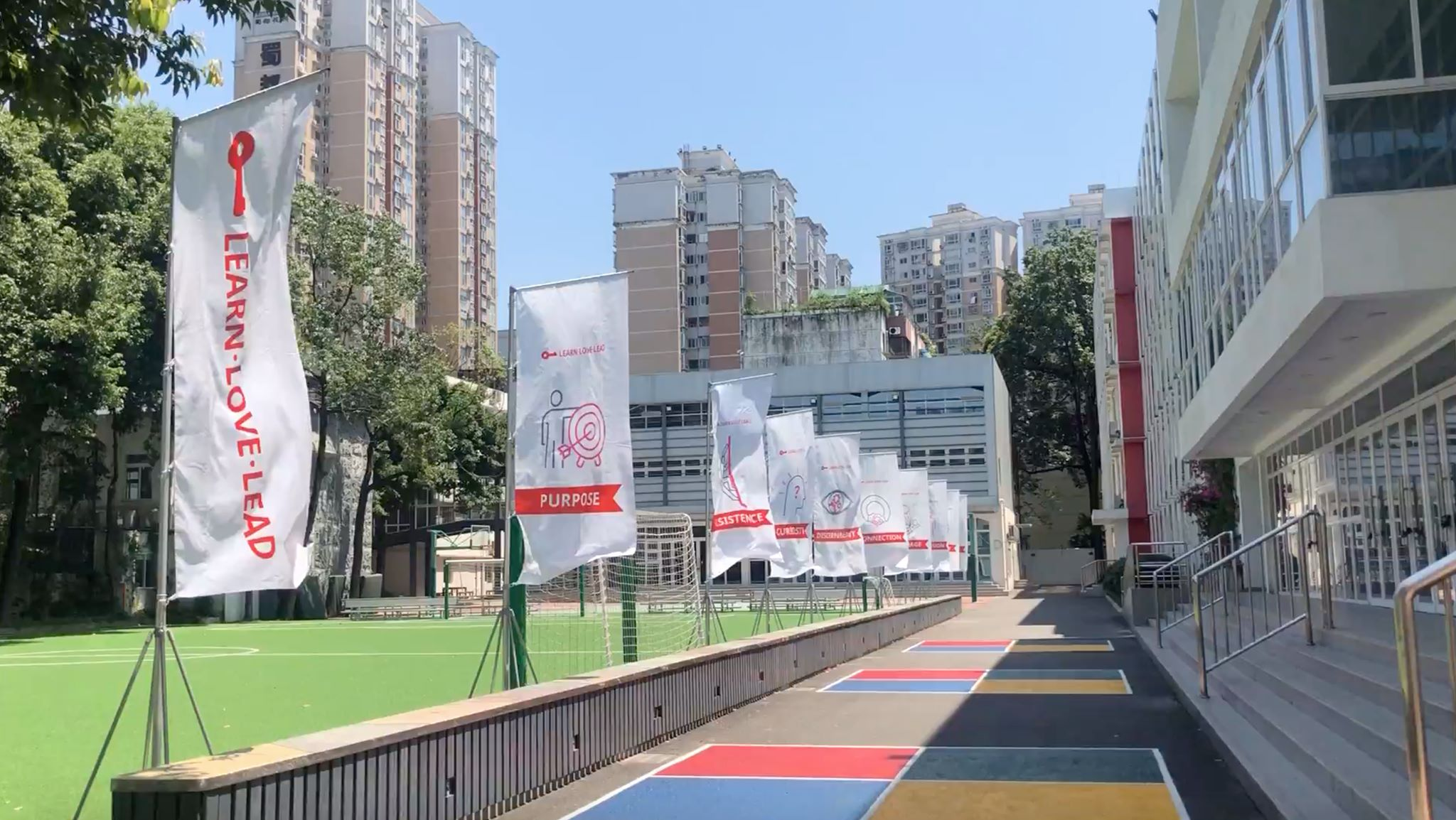

Chengdu International School (CDIS; Chinese: 成都爱思瑟国际学校; lit. 'Chengdu Aisise International School') is a private for-profit secondary school and a school for children of foreign personnel in Jinjiang, Chengdu, Sichuan, China.
