= Xining International Academy =

School in Xining, Qinghai, China

- Simplified Chinese: 西宁外籍人员子女学校
- Traditional Chinese: 西寧外籍人員子女學校
- Literal meaning: Xining School for Children of Foreign Employees
Transcriptions
Standard Mandarin
- Hanyu Pinyin: Xīníng Wàijí Rényuán Zǐnǚ Xuéxiào

Xining International Academy (XIA; Chinese: 西宁外籍人员子女学校) is an international school in Xining, Qinghai, China established in 1997. It serves grades PreK through 12 and is located on the third floor of Xining No. 4 Secondary School (西宁第四高级中学). As of 2018 the school had about 80 students from 22 countries.

== History ==
Since 1997, Xining International Academy (XIA) has graduated six classes. It is the only accredited international school in the entire province of Qinghai, and thus the only location in Qinghai where a student can take AP (Advanced Placement) tests.

== School Culture ==
XIA has developed its own culture, and students who attend can benefit greatly from the international setting. Students from various countries attend, the curriculum is mostly American, and it is located in a predominantly Chinese-speaking region.

It teaches Chinese to help students understand Chinese religions and cultures. XIA encourages students to be proactive, kind, helpful, and culturally appropriate, as well as to remember their heritage.

XIA is an active member of its community, frequently organizing things like: help for the poor, Christmas fun for orphanages and hospitals, sports days, swaps, performances in multiple locations, and many other things that benefit both the community and the student body.
