= Nanjing International School =

International school in Nanjing, Jiangsu, China

- 南京国际外籍人员子女学校
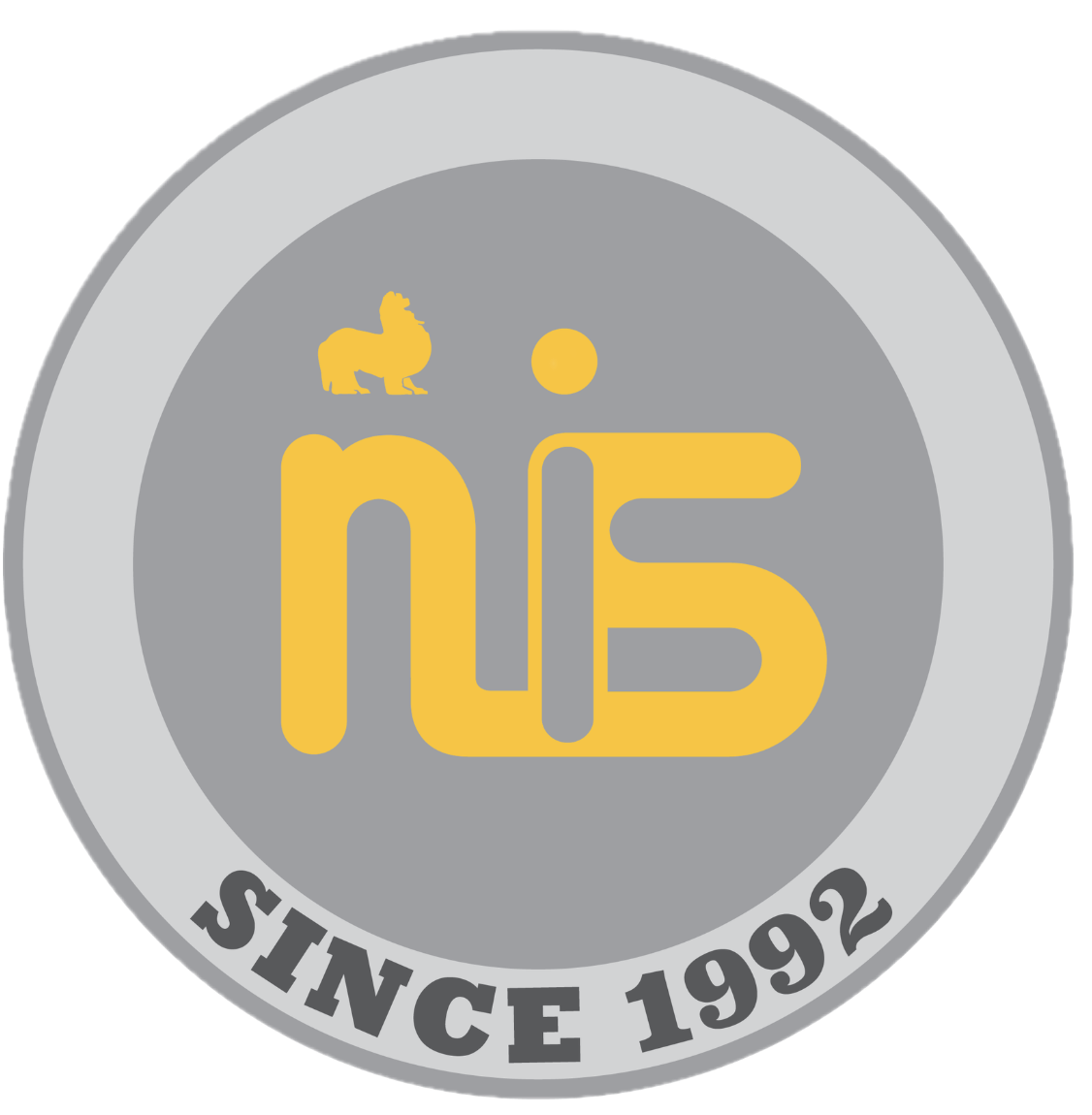

Location
- Xue Heng Lu 8, Xian Lin College and University Town, Qi Xia District, Nanjing PRC 210023 中国南京市栖霞区仙林大学城学衡路8号 邮编:210023; Nanjing Qixia District, Jiangsu; China
- Coordinates: 32.0938789°N 118.9170077°E

Information
- Type: International School (non-profit)
- Established: 1992
- Director: Laurie McLellan
- Principal: Jaqui Patrick (Primary) and Sara Morrow (Secondary)
- Faculty: 98
- Grades: Pre School - Grade 12
- Enrollment: 600
- Colours: Yellow, Grey, Navy Blue, Orange
- Mascot: Pixiu
- Website: www.nischina.org

Nanjing International School
- Traditional Chinese: 南京國際外籍人員子女學校
- Simplified Chinese: 南京国际外籍人员子女学校
Transcriptions
Standard Mandarin
- Hanyu Pinyin: Nánjīng Guójì Wàijí Rényuán Zǐnǚ Xuéxiào

Nanjing International School is a non-profit International school in Xian Lin College and University Town (仙林大学城), Qixia District, Nanjing, enrolling children age 3 to 18 from Pre-Kindergarten to Grade 12. It has around 620 students from over 30 countries.

== History ==
The school was founded on October 14, 1992, by a small group of expatriate parents who wanted to provide English language education for their children. Initially, the school was named Nanjing American School and had five students ranging from Grades 1 to 5. In 1996, the school was officially registered by the Nanjing authorities and changed its name to Nanjing International School.

After three years of operating in rented rooms at the Nanjing Foreign Language School (NFLS), the enrollment at Nanjing International School grew, requiring more space than the two classrooms at NFLS. As a result, NIS board members approved the renovation of two buildings belonging to the Nanjing Dingshan hotel, which were converted into classrooms to accommodate primary/nursery, elementary, and middle school students.

In 1997, NIS hired Mr. Gez Hayden as the first School Director. Between 1998 and 2000, NIS was accredited by the International Baccalaureate to teach the Middle Years Programme (1998), Diploma Programme (1999), and Primary Years Programme (2000), making NIS the first IB Continuum School in China.

== Curriculum ==
It was the first school in China fully authoried by the International Baccalaureate Organisation to offer the Primary Years (PYP), Middle Years (MYP) and Diploma Programmes (DP).

== Facilities ==
The school's purpose-built campus spans over an area of 60,000 square meters.

=== Weekend programmes ===
The Japanese Weekend School of Nanjing (南京日本語補習授業校 Nankin Nihongo Hoshū Jugyō Kō), a Japanese weekend program, holds its classes at NIS. Parent run Korean School on Saturdays.
