= Japanese School of Guangzhou =

International school in Guangzhou, China

- 広州日本人学校 广州日本人学校

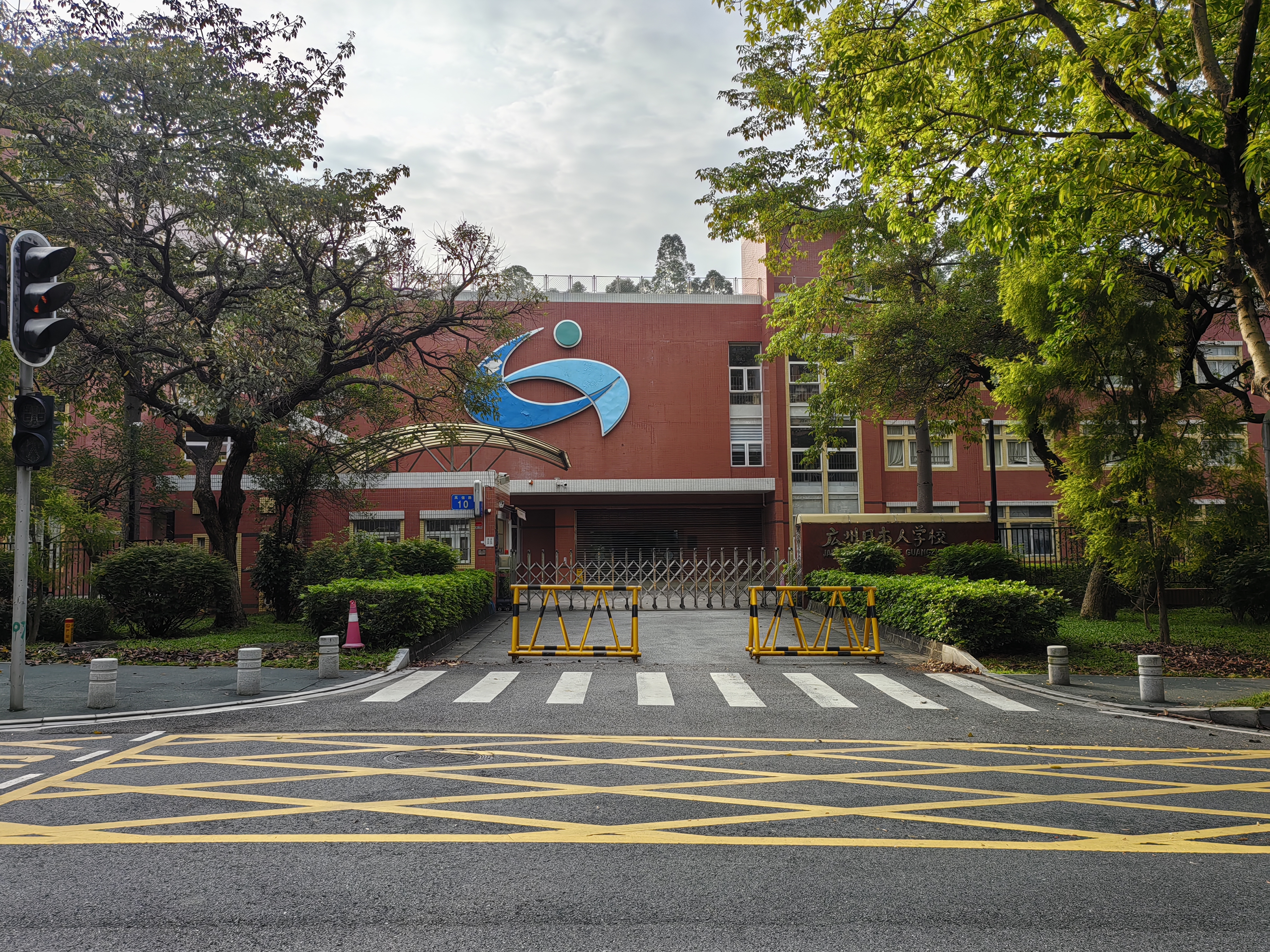

Location
- 10 Fengxin Road, Guangzhou Hi-tech Industrial Development Zone, Guangzhou, Guangdong 広東省広州市高新技術産業開発区風信路10号 广东省广州市高新技术产业开发区风信路10号; 23.168957°N 113.42451400000004°E

Information
- Established: 1995; 31 years ago
- Website: jsgcn.com

Japanese School of Guangzhou

Chinese name
- Simplified Chinese: 广州日本人学校
- Traditional Chinese: 廣州日本人學校
Transcriptions
Standard Mandarin
- Hanyu Pinyin: Guǎngzhōu Rìběnrén Xuéxiào
Yue: Cantonese
- Jyutping: gwong2 zau1 jat6 bun2 jan4 hok6 haau6

Japanese name
- Kanji: 広州日本人学校
Transcriptions
- Romanization: Kōshū Nihonjin Gakkō

The Japanese School of Guangzhou is a Japanese international school in Tianhe District, Guangzhou, Guangdong, China. It was established in April 1995 (Heisei year 7). On June 13, 1995, the Ministry of Education of China approved the establishment of the school.

As of May 2021, there were 267 students enrolled at the Japanese School of Guangzhou.

== See also ==
- Japanese people in China

Mainland China-aligned Chinese international schools in Japan:

- Kobe Chinese School
- Yokohama Yamate Chinese School
