= Xiamen International School =

- 厦门国际学校

Location
- 262 Xingbei San Lu, Xinglin, Jimei District; Xiamen, Fujian; China
- Coordinates: 24.58538°N 118.04147°E

Information
- Type: Private; School for children of foreign personnel
- Established: August 1, 1997
- Colours: Blue, Gold
- Mascot: Dolphin
- Website: xischina.com

Xiamen International School (厦门国际学校) is a private secondary school for children of foreign personnel that is located in Xiamen, Fujian, China.
