= Utahloy International School Guangzhou =

School in Baiyun, Guangzhou, China

Coordinates: 23.2028°N 113.3410°E

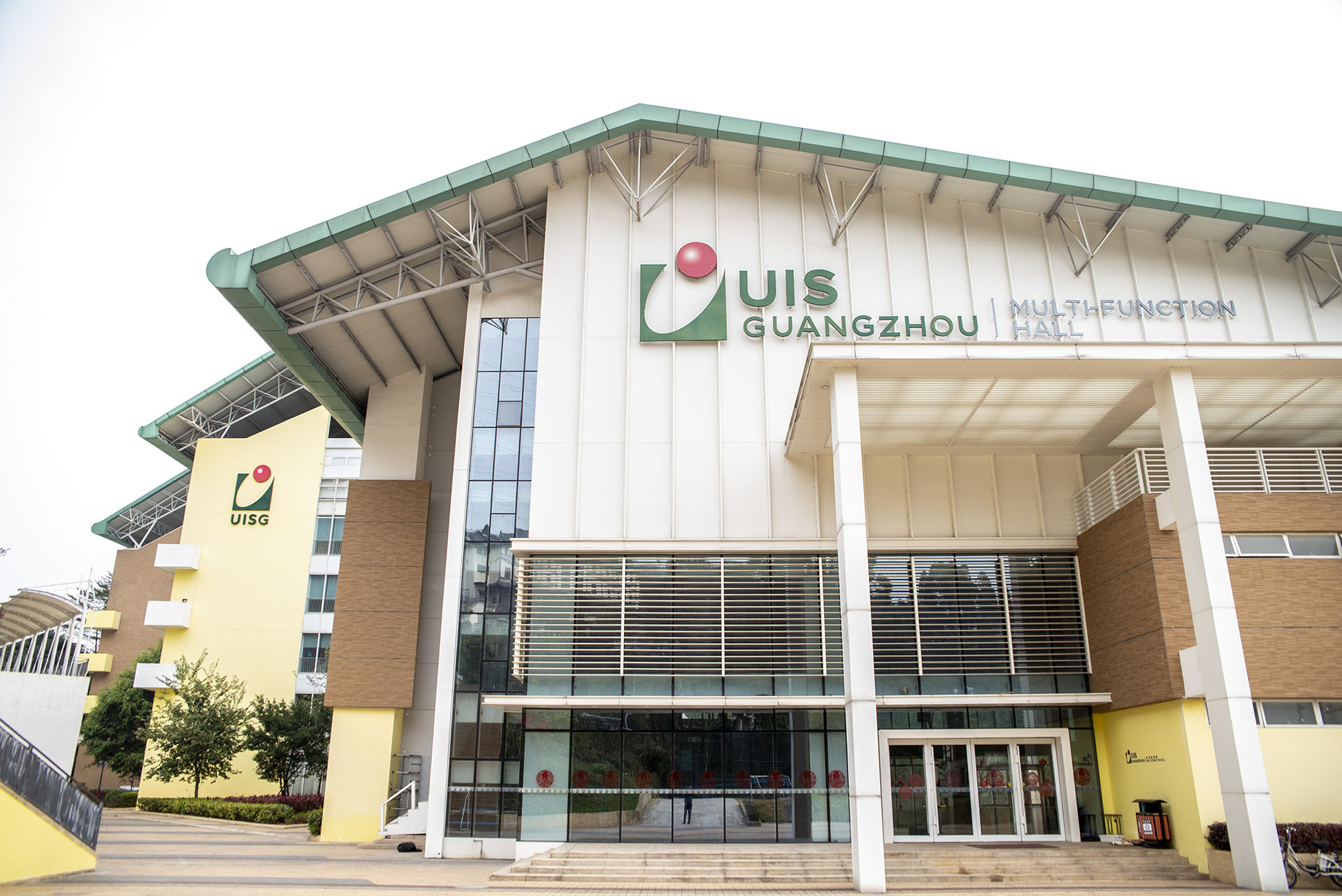
- Multi-Function Hall

Location
- 800, Sha Tai North Road, Bai Yun District, 510515 Guangzhou, Guangdong, P.R. China

Information
- Type: Private International School
- Established: 1998
- Enrollment: 900+
- Color: Green
- Athletics conference: ACAMIS; SDRC; PRC; NUX
- Mascot: Wolves
- Affiliations: Council of International Schools; IB World School; Western Association of Schools and Colleges; Association of China and Mongolia International Schools
- Website: utahloy.cn/gz

Utahloy International School Guangzhou
- Simplified Chinese: 广州誉德莱外籍人员子女学校
- Traditional Chinese: 廣州譽德萊外籍人員子女學校
Transcriptions

Utahloy International School Guangzhou (UISG) is a school with English-language class instruction in Baiyun District, Guangzhou. UISG serves students aged 2 to 19 from over 50 countries. There are seven major native languages, including English, Chinese, Korean, French, Japanese, German, and Spanish. The school offers three types of programs: Primary Year, Middle Year, and Diploma. An average of 18 students per class, with a teacher-to-student ratio of 1 to 8.

== History ==
The Chinese name was originally 广州裕达隆国际学校 when the school was established on 14 July 1998. On 6 June 2012, the Chinese name became 广州誉德莱国际学校. on 2023, the Chinese name became 广州誉德莱外籍人员子女学校.

== Academic accreditation ==
UISG is accredited by the Council of International Schools (CIS) and Western Association of Schools and Colleges (WASC). It is authorized by the International Baccalaureate Organization to provide the IB Primary Years Programme (IBPYP), IB Middle Years Programme (IBMYP) and IB Diploma Programme (IBDP).
