= Xi'an International School =

- Xi'an; China

Information
- Type: International, Co-Educational, Private, Profit
- Motto: Engaging and Empowering Life-long Learners and Tomorrow's Leaders
- Founded: 1997
- Superintendent: Paul Wendler
- Principal: Brittainy Harris
- Grades: PreK–12
- Student to teacher ratio: <8:1
- Campus type: Tiny Private Campus
- Colors: Blue and Gold
- Mascot: Warriors

Xi'an International School (XIS; simplified Chinese: 西安国际学校; traditional Chinese: 西安國際學校; pinyin: Xī'ān Guójì Xuéxiào) is a private, international day school in Xi'an, China. It was the city's first licensed international school, established to provide a schooling option for the children of expatriate businesspeople and diplomats, and NGO workers. It provides kindergarten through 12th-grade classes that follow the American education system.

== History ==
The school was founded in March 1997 with the help of the Shaanxi Provincial Bureau of Education. The first teacher and principal was Esther Kenyon, who taught eleven students spanning eight grades in a one-room schoolhouse.

The State Ministry of Education in Beijing formally granted the school a license to operate in 1999, and it celebrated its grand opening in August of that year. Since then, the school has expanded rapidly and now educates students from over 20 countries. The school follows an American curriculum, and students graduate with an American high school diploma.
