= List of international schools in Beijing =

This is a list of international schools in Beijing

== List of schools ==
- AISB-Hope International (Previously Australian International School Beijing)
- Canadian International School of Beijing
- Lycée Français International Charles de Gaulle de Pékin
- Deutsche Botschaftsschule Peking
- Japanese School of Beijing
- Korean International School in Beijing
- Pakistan Embassy College Beijing
- Russian Embassy School in Beijing
- British School of Beijing, Sanlitun
- British School of Beijing, Shunyi
- Dulwich College Beijing
- Harrow International School Beijing
- Nord Anglia School Beijing, Fangshan
- International School of Beijing
- Beanstalk International Bilingual School
- Beijing Concord College of Sino-Canada
- Beijing City International School
- Beijing Haidian International School
- Beijing Huijia Private School
- Beijing International Bilingual Academy
- Beijing Kinglong International School
- Beijing Royal School
- Beijing Shuren Ribet Private School
- Beijing World Youth Academy
- Beijing Zhongguancun International School
- Pennon Foreign Language School, Beijing
- The International School of Collaborative Learning
- Springboard International Bilingual School
- Beijing Keystone Academy
- Tsinghua International School
- Western Academy of Beijing
- Yang Guang Qing School of Beijing
- Yew Chung International School of Beijing
- Yew Wah International Education School of Beijing
- Beijing Horizon International School
- Beijing Moonshot Academy
- Beijing JPED Academy
- Beijing Etu School
- Aurora Boya Academy Of Beijing

International Departments:

- Beijing National Day School
- Beijing No. 101 School
- Beijing No. 4 School
- Beijing RDFZ International Curriculum Center

Closed:

- Beijing Korean School
- Swedish School Beijing
- Beijing Saint Paul American School
- Beijing BISS International School
- Beijing Rego British School
