= List of schools in Pinggu, Beijing =

This is a list of schools in Pinggu District, Beijing.

== Secondary schools ==
Note: In China the word 中学 zhōngxué, literally translated as "middle school", refers to any secondary school and differs from the American usage of the term "middle school" to mean specifically a lower secondary school or junior high school. 初中 chūzhōng is used to refer to a lower secondary school.

- Beijing Experimental School (北京实验学校)
- Beijing Experimental School Affiliated High School (北京实验学校附属中学)
- High School Affiliated to Beijing Normal University Pinggu No. 1 Branch School (北京师范大学附属中学平谷第一分校)
- Beijing International Studies University Pinggu Affiliated School (北京第二外国语学院平谷附属学校)
- Beijing Lugu Xiaoxiangyu Art School (北京绿谷小香玉艺术学校)
- Beijing City Pinggu High School (北京市平谷中学)
- Beijing City Pinggu District No. 3 High School (北京市平谷区第三中学)
- Beijing City Pinggu District No. 4 High School (北京市平谷区第四中学)
- Beijing City Pinggu District No. 5 High School (北京市平谷区第五中学)
- Beijing City Pinggu District No. 7 High School (北京市平谷区第七中学)
- Beijing City Pinggu District Dahuashan High School (北京市平谷区大华山中学)
- Beijing City Pinggu District Huangsongyu High School (北京市平谷区黄松峪中学)
- Beijing City Pinggu District Liujiahe High School (北京市平谷区刘家河中学)
- Beijing City Pinggu District Machangying High School (北京市平谷区马昌营中学)
- Beijing City Pinggu District Menlouzhuang High School (北京市平谷区门楼庄中学)
- Beijing City Pinggu District Shandongzhuang High School (北京市平谷区山东庄中学)
- Beijing City Pinggu District Xiagezhuang Lianban High School (北京市平谷区夏各庄联办中学)
- Beijing City Pinggu District Yukou High School (北京市平谷区峪口中学)
- Beijing City Pinggu District Special Education Center (北京市平谷区特教中心)
- Beijing City Pinggu District Vocational School (北京市平谷区职业学校)

== International schools ==
There are a lot of international schools in Beijing which they originated from another country. Some of them use their own languages as language of instruction and the education language is English for most of them. Here's a part of this list;

- The British School of Beijing, Shunyi
- Harrow Beijing
- Beijing SMIC Private School - English Track
- Tsinghua University High School International
- Dulwich College Beijing
- Beijing Royal School
- Beijing National Day School International Department
- Haidian Kaiwen Academy
- Chaoyang Kaiwen Academy
- Yew Chung International School of Beijing
- Canadian International School of Beijing
- Beijing Aidi School
- Western Academy of Beijing
- Beijing City International School
- Limai Chinese American (International) School
- Saint Paul American School
- AISB-Hope International
- The International Montessori School of Beijing
- Swiss School Beijing
- Beijing Shuren Ribet Private School
- Beijing BISS International School
- International School of Beijing
- Keystone Academy
- Beijing World Youth Academy
- Beijing Huijia Private School
- 3e International School
- Beijing Enlighten School
- Lycée Français International Charles de Gaulle de Péking
- Springboard International Bilingual School
- Beijing International Bilingual Academy
