= Association of China and Mongolia International Schools =

Non-profit association of international schools

- ACAMIS Logo
- Type: Education and Athletic
- Location: Hong Kong
- Region served: Eastern Asia
- Members: 57
- CEO: Jan Vlcek
- Notable athletes: Andrew Eves (QSI Shekou), Anthony Lei (DCB)
- Website: acamis.org

Association of China and Mongolia International Schools (ACAMIS; traditional Chinese: 中蒙國際學校協會; simplified Chinese: 中蒙国际学校协会; pinyin: Zhōng Měng Guójì Xuéxiào Xiéhuì) is a non-profit association of international schools in eastern Asia and comprises over 50 international schools from China, Taiwan and Mongolia. The association acts as a networking platform with the aims to broaden the education dimensions of participating schools, advance the professional growth of school staff members, promote international friendship within the schools through activities, encourage student interaction through extra curricular activities in sports, the arts, and environmental issues, and finally collaborate on the professional development of participating members.

Members of ACAMIS are all international schools within the region, having commitment to an international program delivered in English. A few of the acceptable curricula are major international, American, Canadian, Australian, or British programs, including the International Baccalaureate, the Council of International Schools, the Western Association of Schools and Colleges, the New England Association of Schools and Colleges, the Middle States Association of Colleges and Schools, Ontario, New Brunswick and Alberta education systems, the Board of Studies, and Ofsted.

ACAMIS holds an annual conference that hosts workshops in regards in learning and the dynamics of interaction with the Chinese culture. The 2012 conference was hosted at the Suzhou Singapore International School in July.

In addition to education and staff development, ACAMIS is also a major sports league in the region, hosting sports tournaments between schools, usually happening after International Schools Association of China (ISAC), and before Asia Pacific Activities Conference (APAC) events.

== Sports ==
The activity and sporting wing of the association is called the Association of China and Mongolia International Schools Sports League (or ACAMIS Sports League), and is one of the largest activities and athletics association in the region. All participating members of ACAMIS are automatically members of the sports league. The ACAMIS Sports League is designed to better meet the aims of ACAMIS through athletic activities by allowing students to experience and participate in cooperative and competitive sport, providing a safe environment, and allowing for students the opportunity to travel and meet new friends.

The three major sporting seasons are volleyball, basketball, and soccer. Other sports include badminton, swimming, table tennis, netball, golf, rugby, and track and field. ACAMIS has eight divisions for 3 major seasons (volleyball, basketball, and soccer). Divisional participants and tournament dates are set at the Athletics Annual General Meeting for the following academic year.

Sports are divided into gender groups and different divisions, with 6 participating schools per division. There are 8 different divisions in ACAMIS: red, yellow, green, orange, gold, blue, silver, and purple. Major sports rules are applied in ACAMIS tournaments; however, there are minor changes to ensure their goal to provide a safe environment for the students to play in. Tournaments are played in round-robin format, followed by elimination games for the most outstanding teams.

== Member schools ==
Mainland China

- Access International Academy Ningbo
- American International School of Guangzhou
- Beijing BISS International School
- Beijing City International School
- Beijing International Bilingual Academy
- British School of Beijing
- Canadian International School of Beijing
- Canadian International School of Hefei
- Concordia International School Shanghai
- Dalian American International School
- Dulwich College Beijing
- Dulwich College Shanghai
- Dulwich College Suzhou
- Harrow International School Beijing
- International Academy of Beijing
- International School of Beijing
- International School of Nanshan Shenzhen
- International School of Qingdao
- International School of Tianjin
- Keystone Academy
- Livingston American School
- Nanjing International School
- Nord Anglia International School Shanghai Pudong
- Qingdao No.1 International School of Shandong Province
- QSI International School of Shekou
- Hangzhou International School
- Shanghai Community International School - Hongqiao Campus
- Shanghai Community International School - Pudong Campus
- Shanghai American School Pudong Campus
- Shanghai American School Puxi Campus
- Shekou International School
- Shenyang Transformation International School
- Suzhou Singapore International School
- TEDA International School
- The British International School Shanghai, Puxi Campus
- The New International School
- Tianjin MTI International School
- Utahloy International School Guangzhou
- Utahloy International School Zengcheng
- Wellington College International Shanghai
- Western Academy of Beijing
- Wuxi Taihu International School
- Xiamen International School
- Yew Chung International School of Beijing
- Yew Chung International School of Shanghai

Hong Kong

- Australian International School Hong Kong
- Canadian International School of Hong Kong
- Chinese International School
- Christian Alliance P.C. Lau Memorial International School
- DSC International School
- Discovery College
- Hong Kong Academy
- Hong Kong International School
- International College Hong Kong
- International College Hong Kong Hong Lok Yuen
- Renaissance College Hong Kong
- Victoria Shanghai Academy
- Yew Chung International School

Macau

- The International School of Macao

Taiwan

- Kaohsiung American School
- Ivy Collegiate Academy
- I-Shou International School

Mongolia

- American School of Ulaanbaatar
- International School of Ulaanbaatar
