= List of schools in Shunyi, Beijing =

This is a list of schools in Shunyi District, Beijing.

== Secondary schools ==
Note: In China the word 中学 zhōngxué, literally translated as "middle school", refers to any secondary school and differs from the American usage of the term "middle school" to mean specifically a lower secondary school or junior high school. 初中 chūzhōng is used to refer to a lower secondary school.

- Beijing No. 4 High School Shunyi Branch School (Beijing City Shunyi District No. 10 High School) (北京市第四中学顺义分校（北京市顺义区第十中学） )
- Beijing City Dingshi School (北京市鼎石学校)
- Beijing City Hai Jia Bilingual School (北京市海嘉双语学校)
- Beijing City Niulanshan No. 1 High School Experimental School (北京市牛栏山一中实验学校)
- Beijing City Xin Fu Xue Foreign Languages School (北京市新府学外国语学校)
- Beijing City Xin Ying Cai School (北京市新英才学校)
- Beijing City Shunyi District No. 4 School (北京市顺义区第四学校)
- Beijing City Shunyi District Gao Li Ying School (北京市顺义区高丽营学校)
- Beijing City Shunyi District Hai De Jing Hua Bilingual School (北京市顺义区海德京华双语学校)
- Beijing City Shunyi District Qingmiao School (北京市顺义区青苗学校)
- Beijing City Shunyi District No. 1 High School (北京市顺义区第一中学)
- Beijing City Shunyi District No. 2 High School (北京市顺义区第二中学)
- Beijing City Shunyi District No. 3 High School (北京市顺义区第三中学)
- Beijing City Shunyi District No. 5 High School (北京市顺义区第五中学)
- Beijing City Shunyi District No. 8 High School (北京市顺义区第八中学)
- Beijing City Shunyi District No. 9 High School (北京市顺义区第九中学)
- Beijing City Shunyi District No. 11 High School (北京市顺义区第十一中学)
- Beijing City Shunyi District No. 12 High School (北京市顺义区第十二中学)
- Beijing City Shunyi District No. 13 High School (北京市顺义区第十三中学)
- Beijing City Shunyi District No. 15 High School (北京市顺义区第十五中学)
- Beijing City Shunyi District Beiwu High School (北京市顺义区北务中学)
- Beijing City Shunyi District Li Qiao High School (北京市顺义区李桥中学)
- Beijing City Shunyi District Li Sui High School (北京市顺义区李遂中学)
- Beijing City Shunyi District Nan Fa Xin High School (北京市顺义区南法信中学)
- Beijing City Shunyi District Niu Lan Shan No. 1 High School (北京市顺义牛栏山第一中学)
- Beijing City Shunyi District Niu Shan No. 2 High School (北京市顺义区牛山第二中学)
- Beijing City Shunyi District Renhe High School (北京市顺义区仁和中学)
- Beijing City Shunyi District Tianzhu High School (北京市顺义区天竺中学)
- Beijing City Shunyi District Yanhe High School (北京市顺义区沿河中学)
- Beijing City Shunyi District Yangzhen No. 1 High School (北京市顺义区杨镇第一中学)
- Beijing City Shunyi District Yangzhen No. 2 High School (北京市顺义区杨镇第二中学)
- Beijing City Shunyi District Zhao Quan Ying High School (北京市顺义区赵全营中学)

== Primary schools ==
- Beijing City Ding Shi School (北京市鼎石学校)
- Beijing City Hai Jia Bilingual School (北京市海嘉双语学校)
- Beijing City Niulanshan No. 1 High School Experimental School (北京市牛栏山一中实验学校)
- Beijing City Xin Fu Xue Foreign Language School (北京市新府学外国语学校)
- Beijing City Xin Ying Cai School (北京市新英才学校)
- Beijing City Shunyi District No. 1 High School Affiliated Primary School (北京市顺义区第一中学附属小学)
- Beijing City Shunyi District Banqiao Central Primary School (北京市顺义区板桥中心小学校)
- Beijing City Shunyi District Beixiaoying Central Primary School (北京市顺义区北小营中心小学校)
- Beijing City Shunyi District Beiwu Central Primary School (北京市顺义区北务中心小学校)
- Beijing City Shunyi District Bohua Foreign Language School (北京市顺义区博华外国语学校)
- Beijing City Shunyi District Cangshang Primary School (北京市顺义区仓上小学)
- Beijing City Shunyi District Choujiadian Central Primary School (北京市顺义区仇家店中心小学校)
- Beijing City Shunyi District Dasungezhuang Central Primary School (北京市顺义区大孙各庄中心小学校)
- Beijing City Shunyi District Dongfeng Primary School (北京市顺义区东风小学)
- Beijing City Shunyi District Gangxin Primary School (北京市顺义区港馨小学)
- Beijing City Shunyi District Gao Li Ying School (北京市顺义区高丽营学校)
- Beijing City Shunyi District Gao Li Ying No. 2 Primary School (北京市顺义区高丽营第二小学)
- Beijing City Shunyi District Guangming Primary School (北京市顺义区光明小学)
- Beijing City Shunyi District Hai De Jing Hua Bilingual School (北京市顺义区海德京华双语学校)
- Beijing City Shunyi District Henancun Central Primary School (北京市顺义区河南村中心小学校)
- Beijing City Shunyi District Houshayu Central Primary School (北京市顺义区后沙峪中心小学校)
- Beijing City Shunyi District Jianxin Primary School (北京市顺义区建新小学)
- Beijing City Shunyi District Konggang Primary School (北京市顺义区空港小学)
- Beijing City Shunyi District Konggang No. 2 Primary School (北京市顺义区空港第二小学)
- Beijing City Shunyi District Ligezhuang School (北京市顺义区李各庄学校)
- Beijing City Shunyi District Liqiao Central Primary School (北京市顺义区李桥中心小学校)
- Beijing City Shunyi District Lisui Central Primary School (北京市顺义区李遂中心小学校)
- Beijing City Shunyi District Longwantun Central Primary School (北京市顺义区龙湾屯中心小学校)
- Beijing City Shunyi District Mapo Central Primary School (北京市顺义区马坡中心小学校)
- Beijing City Shunyi District Mapo No. 2 Primary School (北京市顺义区马坡第二小学)
- Beijing City Shunyi District Mingde Primary School (北京市顺义区明德小学)
- Beijing City Shunyi District Mulin Central Primary School (北京市顺义区木林中心小学校)
- Beijing City Shunyi District Nancai Experimental School (北京市顺义区南彩实验学校)
- Beijing City Shunyi District Nancai No. 1 Primary School (北京市顺义区南彩第一小学)
- Beijing City Shunyi District Nancai No. 2 Primary School (北京市顺义区南彩第二小学)
- Beijing City Shunyi District Nanfaxin Central Primary School (北京市顺义区南法信中心小学校)
- Beijing City Shunyi District Niulanshan No. 1 Primary School (北京市顺义区牛栏山第一小学)
- Beijing City Shunyi District Niulanshan No. 2 Primary School (北京市顺义区牛栏山第二小学)
- Beijing City Shunyi District Niulanshan No. 3 Primary School (北京市顺义区牛栏山第三小学)
- Beijing City Shunyi District Qing Miao School (北京市顺义区青苗学校)
- Beijing City Shunyi District Renhe Central Primary School (北京市顺义区仁和中心小学校)
- Beijing City Shunyi District Shaling School (北京市顺义区沙岭学校)
- Beijing City Shunyi District Shicao Central Primary School (北京市顺义区北石槽中心小学校)
- Beijing City Shunyi District Shiyuan Primary School (北京市顺义区石园小学)
- Beijing City Shunyi District Shuangxing Primary School (北京市顺义区双兴小学)
- Beijing City Shunyi District Tianzhu No. 1 Primary School (北京市顺义区天竺第一小学)
- Beijing City Shunyi District Tianzhu No. 2 Primary School (北京市顺义区天竺第二小学)
- Beijing City Shunyi District Xiaodian Central Primary School (北京市顺义区小店中心小学校)
- Beijing City Shunyi District Xixin Primary School (北京市顺义区西辛小学)
- Beijing City Shunyi District Yanhe Central Primary School (北京市顺义区沿河中心小学校)
- Beijing City Shunyi District Yangzhen Central Primary School (北京市顺义区杨镇中心小学校)
- Beijing City Shunyi District Yudalong Primary School (北京市顺义区裕达隆小学)
- Beijing City Shunyi District Yulong Primary School (北京市顺义区裕龙小学) - New Century Institute School Site (现代学院校址) and Yulong School Site (裕龙校址)
- Beijing City Shunyi District Zhangzhen Central Primary School (北京市顺义区张镇中心小学校)
- Beijing City Shunyi District Zhaoquanying Central Primary School (北京市顺义区赵全营中心小学校)
- Capital Normal University Affiliated Shunyi Experimental School (首都师范大学附属顺义实验小学)

== International schools ==
- International School of Beijing Shunyi Campus
- The British School of Beijing, Shunyi
- Dulwich College Beijing
- International Montessori School of Beijing River Garden Campus and Champagne Cove Campus
- Beijing New Talent Academy
- Beijing International Bilingual Academy
- Springboard International Bilingual School

Closed:

- Swedish School Beijing - Gahood Villa (嘉浩别墅)
- Beijing Rego British School
