= Tsinghua (disambiguation) =

Tsinghua University is a major research university in Beijing, China.

Tsinghua may also refer to:

- National Tsing Hua University, Taiwan
- Tsinghua Garden, Beijing, China
- Tsinghua Holdings
- Tsinghua International School
- Tsinghua Big Five Alliance
