= Access International Academy Ningbo =

- 宁波爱学国际学校
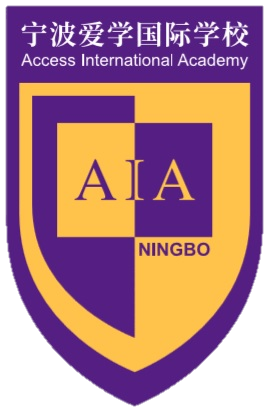

Location
- No. 1 Ai Xue Road; Beilun District; Ningbo, Zhejiang, 315800; China
- 29.89649°N 121.82508°E

Information
- Other name: AIAN
- School type: Accredited, international school
- Established: August 2002
- Head of school: Mr. Ryan Godlewski
- Teaching staff: 29 qualified foreign teachers
- Enrollment: 120 (From Kindergarten to High School)
- Student to teacher ratio: 10:1
- Classes offered: Pre-K to grade 12 American curriculum + Mandarin Chinese as a foreign language
- Language: English, Mandarin
- Hours in school day: 8:30-3:30 M, W, F + 8:30-4:15 T, Th
- Colors: Purple and Gold
- Athletics: ACAMIS Athletics, Academic, Arts & Cultural Events
- Sports: Volleyball, basketball, soccer
- Mascot: Eagles
- Accreditation: Western Association of Schools and Colleges
- Tuition: See website
- Graduates: as of 2007: 13 total
- Website: www.aian.org.cn

Access International Academy Ningbo (AIAN, Chinese: 宁波爱学国际学校) is an international school in the Beilun District of Ningbo, China offering educational programs from Nursery to Grade 12 to students of 28 nationalities. AIAN, HD Ningbo and Georigia School are the only international schools in Ningbo accredited by the Western Association of Schools and Colleges (WASC).

AIAN is a member of the Association of China and Mongolia International Schools (ACAMIS) and the East Asia Regional Council of Overseas Schools (EARCOS).
