= Tianjin International School =

Tianjin International School (TIS) (天津思锐外籍人员子女学校)
- Tianjin; China

Information
- Type: Private, Day School
- Established: 1986
- Head of School: Ryan Witt
- Faculty: 81 full-time
- Employees: 145
- Enrollment: 302 (2026)
- Language: English
- Campus: SiShuiDao Hexi District
- Colors: Blue, light purple, and White
- Sports: Soccer, Basketball, Volleyball
- Mascot: Eagles
- Website: tiseagles.com

The Tianjin International School (TIS) is a private, international school in Hexi District of Tianjin, China. Students attend from the age of three through to high school graduation. Founded in 1986, it was the first of six schools in iSC (International Schools Consortium) established in six Chinese cities: Qingdao, Shenyang, Chengdu, Wuxi, Wuhan, and Yantai.

Students from around the world attend, including Australia, Canada, France, Hong Kong, Japan, Netherlands, Singapore, South Africa, South Korea, Australia, Germany, United Kingdom, India and the United States. The school is Accredited with Distinction by Cognia and is affiliated with organizations such as EARCOS (East Asia Regional Council of Schools), ACAMIS(Association of China and Mongolia International Schools), and AmCham (American Chamber of Commerce).

TIS offers an honors program, as well as providing opportunities to take the PSAT, SAT, ACT, and AP exams. In 2019, TIS was approved for the AP Capstone Diploma Program.

TIS employs 81 faculty members from many countries including the United States, Canada, Australia, Europe, and Asia.

Tianjin Municipal Education Commission list Tianjin International School as one of five approved schools for children of foreign nationals.

Tianjin International School's address is No. 4-1 Sishui Road, Hexi District, Tianjin, China, 300222.
