= American School of Ulaanbaatar =

School in Khan-Uul, Ulaanbaatar, Mongolia

Coordinates: 47.8827°N 106.9198°E

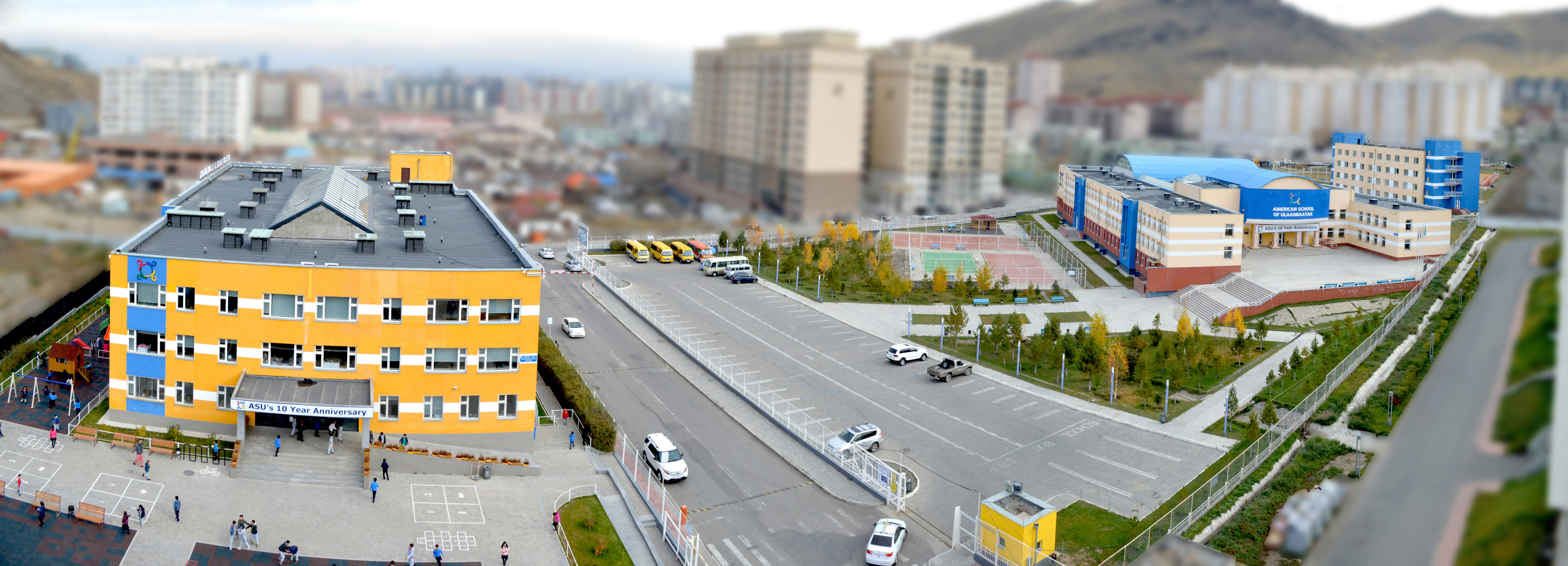

The American School of Ulaanbaatar (ASU) in Khan Uul, Ulaanbaatar, Mongolia is a private international school, which was founded in 2006. It offers an educational program from Pre-kindergarten to Grade 12 for students of all nationalities. As of 2020, enrollment is at 395 in the elementary school and 255 in the secondary school representing over 25 different nationalities. There are currently 117 staff members with 46 foreign teachers.

== Facilities ==
The campus consists of an elementary building and a secondary building on 5 acres of land. The campus has an outdoor soccer field, tennis court and basketball court. Indoor facilities include libraries, computer labs, gymnasiums, dance rooms, art rooms, music rooms, science labs as well as a fitness room, auditorium and atrium.

== Curriculum ==
The American School of Ulaanbaatar offers a curriculum aligned with the Massachusetts Curriculum Framework and is accredited by the Western Association of Schools and Colleges, California. ASU's instruction is provided in English. The class size is limited to 24 students. Due to regulation, Mongolian students take Mongolian history and language courses. Foreign students are offered Introduction to Mongolian courses. For a third language, secondary school students can choose between French and Chinese. ASU offers a variety of Advanced Placement courses to secondary students taught by AP trained teachers. The school is one of the Advanced Placement (AP) exam centers in Ulaanbaatar. The graduation requirement for students is the completion of a minimum of 30 credits: 18 in compulsory courses and 12 in electives. To help students to prepare for standardized testing, ASU provides an optional PSAT testing session each spring. Also, ASU is a registered SAT testing center in Ulaanbaatar and the sessions are open to any student in Mongolia who is registering for SAT tests throughout the year.

The school is a member of ACAMIS (the Association of China and Mongolia International Schools) which provides opportunities for students to be involved in sport competition and for teachers to be involved in professional development. As well, the school has chapters of National Honor Society, National Art Honor Society, Science National Honor Society, and National Junior Honor Society.
