= Christian Alliance P.C. Lau Memorial International School =

- 宣道會劉平齋紀念國際學校
- 2 Fu Ning Street, Kowloon; Hong Kong

Information
- Type: International school
- Motto: Be an example in speech and behaviour, in love, faith and purity.
- Established: 1992
- Head of school: Dr. Cora Hui
- Grades: Preparatory to Grade 6
- Enrollment: 220 as of 2021
- Language: English and Mandarin
- Colors: Pink, green, lime and baby blue
- Mascot: Christ Ambassador
- Affiliation: Kowloon Tong Church of the Chinese Christian and Missionary Alliance (KTAC)
- Website: www.capcl.edu.hk

Christian Alliance P.C. Lau Memorial International School (CAPCL) is an Evangelical Christian primary international school in Hong Kong. The school uses the curriculum of Alberta, Canada. It is affiliated with the Kowloon Tong Church of the Chinese Christian and Missionary Alliance.

== History ==
Christian Alliance P.C. Lau Memorial International School (CAPCL), formerly known as Christian Alliance International School (CAIS) in short, opened as a primary and secondary Christian school owned and operated by Kowloon Tong Church of the Chinese Christian and Missionary Alliance (KTAC). CAIS began operations in September 1992 with approximately 40 secondary school students. In 1995, the school expanded to include elementary education. The school used the former campus of Christian Alliance College in Ma Tau Chung, Kowloon City District, which was also founded by KTAC. Christian Alliance College relocated to Tuen Mun, New Territories, in 1992 in phases. The last class of Christian Alliance College in the Ma Tau Chung campus was held in 1995–1996 academic year.

Christian Alliance P.C. Lau Memorial International School closed for renovations in 2017.

In 2020, the original campus in Ma Tau Chung re-opened as a primary school under the original full name Christian Alliance P.C. Lau Memorial International School.

== Academics ==
The school maintains an evangelical Christian environment and requires all students to speak English. CAPCL uses the curriculum of Alberta Education with a bilingual program at all grade levels. The medium of instruction is "approximately 65% English and 35% Chinese (Mandarin with traditional script)".
