= International School of Ulaanbaatar =

Secondary school in Khan-Uul, Ulaanbaatar, Mongolia

Coordinates: 47°53′55.5″N 106°55′48.3″E

- Khan Uul, Ulaanbaatar; Mongolia

Information
- Established: 1992
- Employees: 92 (2023-2024)
- Enrollment: 224 students (2023-2024)

The International School of Ulaanbaatar (ISU; Mongolian: Улаанбаатар дахь Олон Улсын Дунд Сургууль), in Khan Uul District, Ulaanbaatar, Mongolia, is a private, coeducational day school which serves students from preschool through grade 12. The Mongolian Ministry of Education granted permission to run the school in May 1992.

ISU is the country's first IB World School.

== Organization ==
The school is governed by a multi-national board, including representatives of parents and embassies. As of May 2015, there were 96 staff members, 50 of whom were Mongolian, and 46 of whom were foreign-hires. Most of the school's income derives from tuition, with some additional funding by the US Government.

== History ==
ISU became an International Baccalaureate school in March 2002.

The school's current campus was built in 2007, with a second expansion in 2015.

On Friday, September 14, 2012, ISU celebrated the 20th anniversary of its founding. The ceremony was attended by the Mayor of Ulaanbaatar, the Minister of Foreign Affairs as well as the Ambassadors from the Embassies of Canada, China, United States of America and other dignitaries such as representatives from the US Department of State and foreign and local Mongolian firms.

As of 2024, the school has experienced a gradual decline due to competition from other schools in the area, with a total school cohort standing at around 200 students as of 2024.
