= Beijing National Day School =

Municipal public secondary school in Beijing, China

Coordinates: 39°54′05″N 116°15′20″E

- 北京市十一学校

Location
- 66 Yuquan Rd; Haidian, Beijing, 100039; China

Information
- Motto: 志远意诚 思方行圆
- Established: September 1952
- Grades: 7–12
- Campus size: 39.5 acres
- Website: bnds.cn

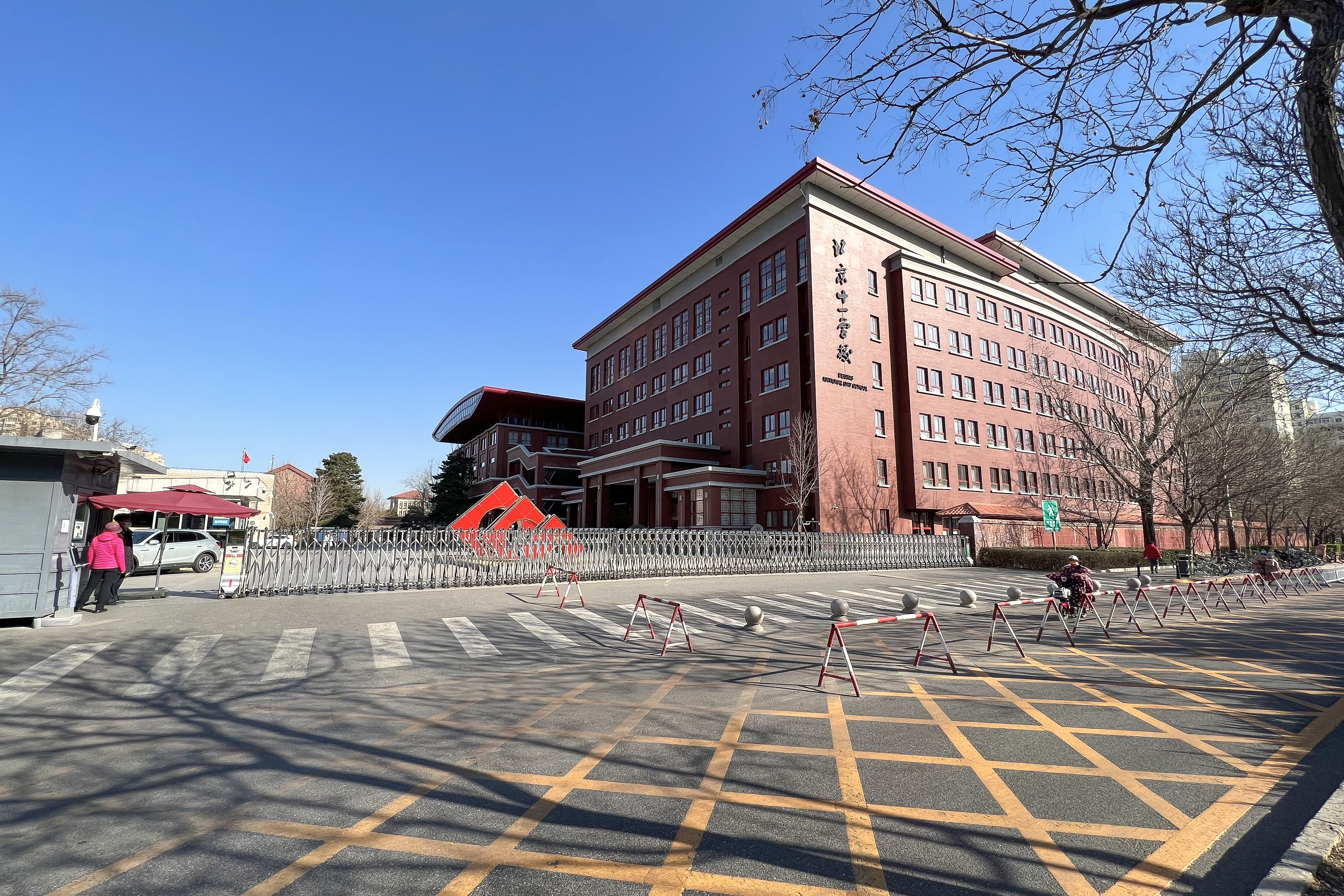
Gate

Beijing National Day School (BNDS; 北京市十一学校; lit. 'Beijing City Ten One School') is a district-level public secondary school in Haidian, Beijing, China. The school is supervised by the Beijing City Haidian District Education Committee. The term "National Day" in the school's English name refers to "October 1," the national public holiday, as mentioned in its Chinese-language name.

The school provides national curriculum and international curriculum (AP, IB DP, A-Level).

== History ==
The school was formerly the New Beijing Ten One Primary School (北京十一小学) established in 1952 and was renamed Beijing City Ten One School in 1962.

The school started to implement the public-owned and private-run model in 1993. In 2009, the school returned to public-run.

In 2013, the school's international program received International Baccalaureate accreditation.

In 2025, Beijing National Day School hosted the second edition of the International Olympiad in Artificial Intelligence from August 2 to 9.
