= Western Academy of Beijing =

International school in Beijing, China

- 北京京西国际学校

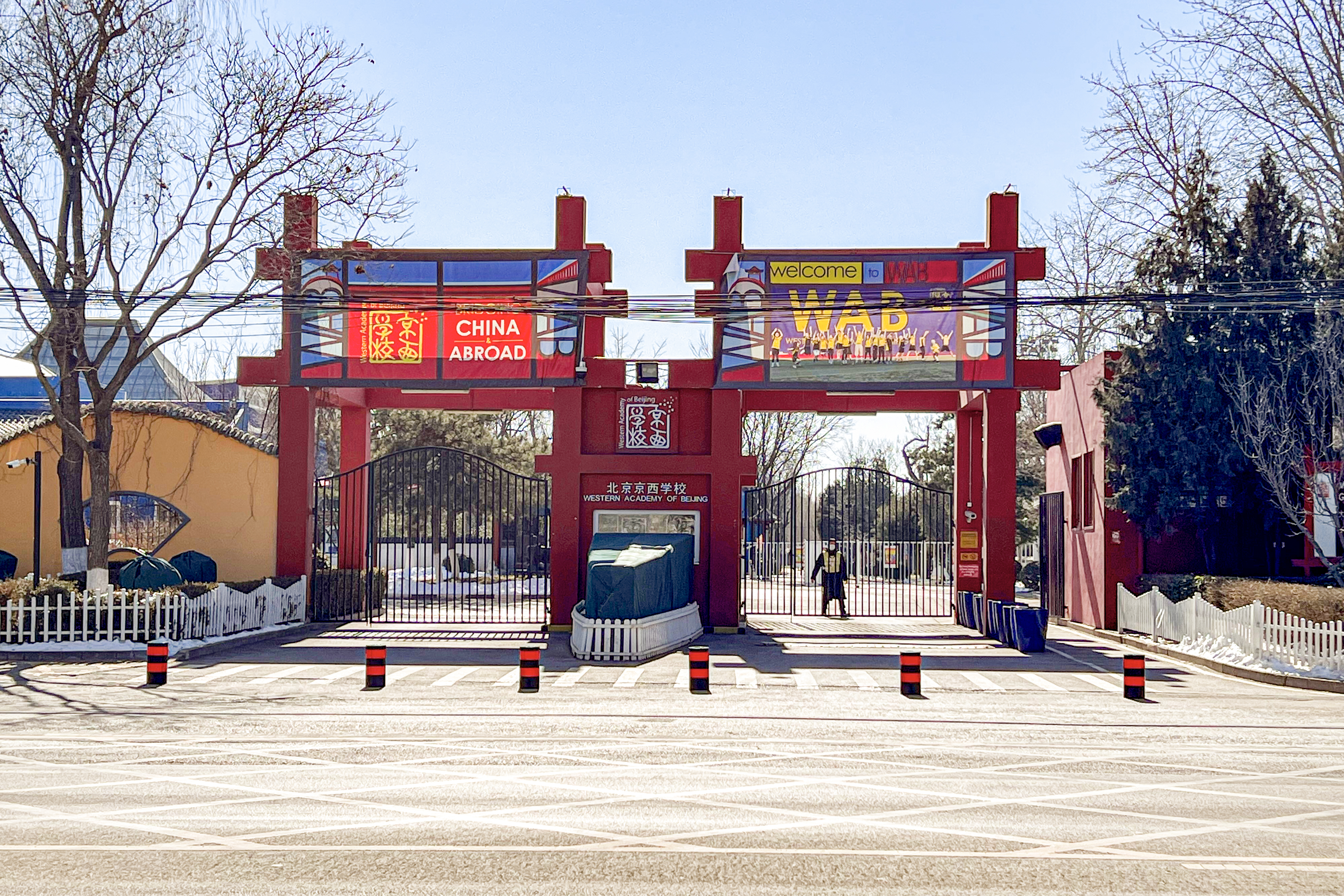
- Main gate

Location
- 10 Laiguangying East Rd. Chaoyang District, Beijing 100102; China; 40°01′18″N 116°30′38″E

Information
- Type: International School, IB World School, Non-profit, Independent, Private School
- Religious affiliation: Nonsectarian
- Founded: 1994
- CEEB code: 694203
- Director: Dr. Marta Medved Krajnovic
- Director of Innovation in Learning and Teaching: Stephen Taylor
- Division Principals: Catherine Pierre-Louis (ES), Marina Frias-Gavidia (MS), Dr. Jaime Pustis (HS)
- Grades: Nursery–12
- Enrollment: 1,400
- Student to teacher ratio: 8:1
- Campus type: Large Private Campus
- Colors: Red, black, yellow
- Athletics conference: ACAMIS, APAC, Tri-Cities, China Cup, ISAC
- Mascot: Tigers
- Annual tuition: $55,000 USD
- Website: www.wab-edu.cn

Western Academy of Beijing
- Simplified Chinese: 北京京西国际学校
- Traditional Chinese: 北京京西國際學校
Transcriptions
Standard Mandarin
- Hanyu Pinyin: Běijīng Jīngxī Guójì Xuéxiào

Western Academy of Beijing (WAB, Chinese: 北京京西国际学校) is an international school located in Beijing. Founded in 1994, the school provides education from early years 3 to grade 12. WAB uses the IB system, including the IB PYP (IB Primary Years Programme) until Grade 5, IB MYP (IB Middle Years Program) up to and including grade 10, and the IB DP (IB Diploma Program) for grades 11 and 12.

== History ==
WAB was established in 1994 by a group of parents and teachers to serve foreign-national families residing in Beijing.

Over time, WAB developed purpose-built facilities and expanded its campus to house Early Years, Elementary, Middle, and High School divisions.

WAB was an Olympic Educational Model School for the Beijing 2008 Olympic Games. Out of the 500 schools across China, which were awarded by Beijing Organising Committee for the Olympic Games as an Olympic Educational Model School, WAB was among the top 120 schools.

== Campus ==
WAB's four school sections, Early Years, Elementary, Middle, and High, are all located on one campus across six buildings. Each school section has its own self-contained environment, and the entire campus is equipped with a indoor air filtration system.

The 99,000 m^{2} campus holds a wide range of facilities, including three libraries, Design Technology Studios, Science labs, film editing and recording studios, as well as music, drama and dance studios. It also includes five dining courts, multiple cafes and lounges, an indoor swimming pool, three full-size gyms, a private-use lake, an outdoor football field, as well as indoor basketball and tennis courts.

== Student body ==
The Western Academy of Beijing currently has a student body of 1,327 students from 58 countries.

== Curriculum ==
WAB offers the IB PYP for Early Years through Grade 5, IB MYP through Grade 10, and the IB DP for Grades 11–12.

English is the primary language of instruction. The school provides support for English language learners through an English as an Additional Language (EAL) program embedded across grade levels. Other languages available as additional language programs are: French, Spanish, and Chinese.

Chinese is supported as a second language through systems like the After-school Language Program, HSK, and a general encouragement to learn.

== Accreditation ==
WAB is accredited by:

- The International Baccalaureate (IBO)
- New England Association of Schools and Colleges (NEASC)
- The Council of International Schools (CIS)

And is a member of:

- International Schools Athletic Conference (ISAC)
- Association of China and Mongolia International Schools (ACAMIS)
- East Asia Regional Council of Schools (EARCOS)
- Tri-Cities Association Beijing, Guangzhou, Shanghai (Tri-Cities 北京，广州，上海)
- Asia Pacific Activities Conference (APAC).
