= Beijing Huijia Private School =

Private school in Beijing, China

Coordinates: 40.19172°N 116.24551°E

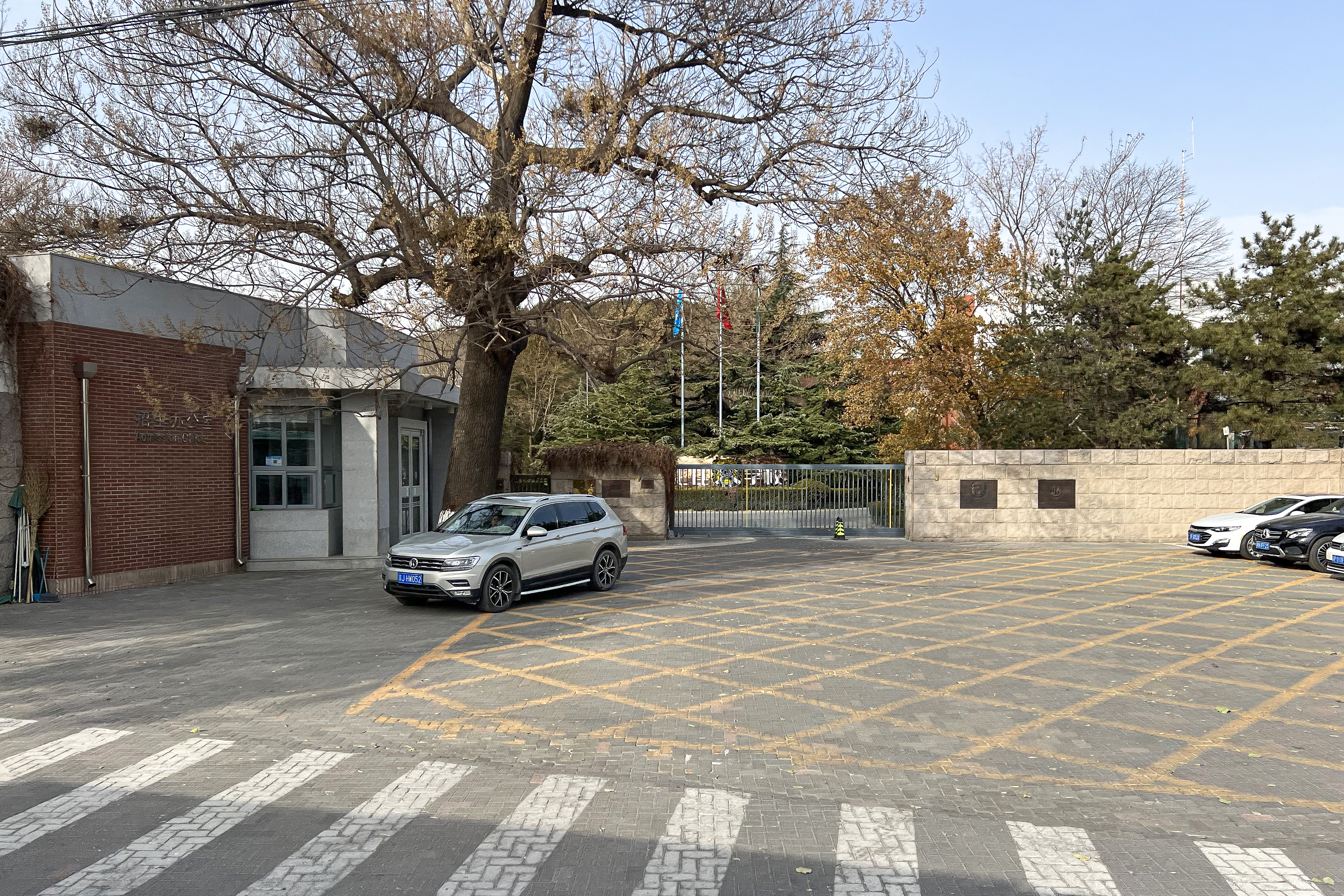
- Simplified Chinese: 北京市私立汇佳学校
- Traditional Chinese: 北京市私立匯佳學校
- Literal meaning: Beijing City Private Huijia School
Transcriptions
Standard Mandarin
- Hanyu Pinyin: Běijīng Shì Sīlì Huìjiā Xuéxiào

Beijing Huijia Private School (Chinese: 北京市私立汇佳学校) is a private school in Changping District, Beijing, China. It serves primary school to senior high school and uses International Baccalaureate. As of 2010 it was the only Beijing private school serving Mainland Chinese students which offered IB. As of that year Zhao Wenxiu was the executive principal. As of 2025, Brian Yang is the executive principal.

It opened in 1993. By 2010 it received permission to accept non-Mainland Chinese students. As of that year 20% of its students were foreigners.

In 2015 the tuition for the year was 220,000 renminbi ($35,442 U.S. dollars). China Daily ranked Huijia Private School as the 5th most expensive private school in Beijing.
