= Beijing Royal School =

Private school in Beijing, China

- Chinese: 北京王府学校
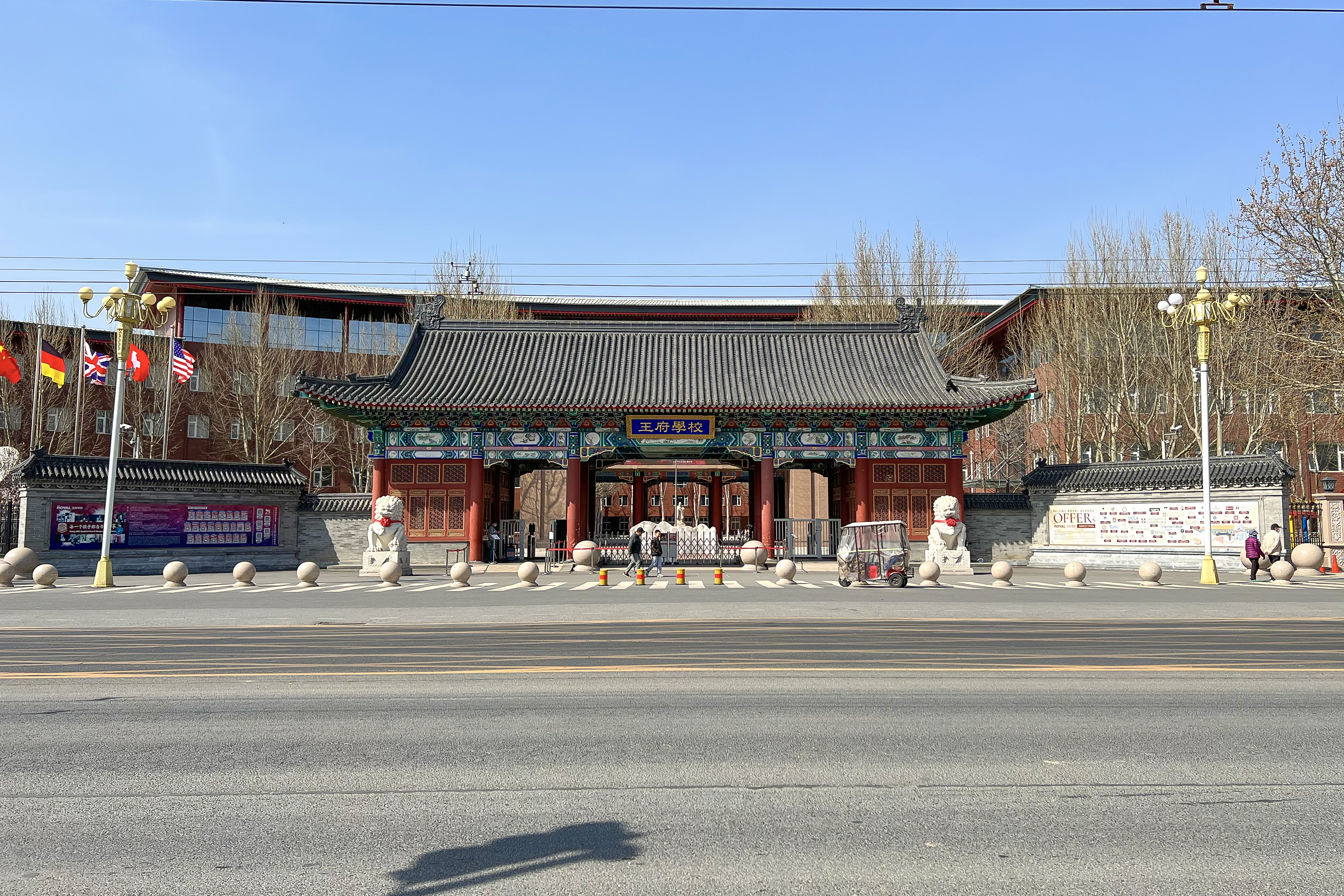

Information
- Established: 2003; 23 years ago
- Founder: Guangfa Wang

Beijing Royal School (BRS; 北京王府学校) is a private high school in Changping, Beijing, China. It was founded in 2003 by Guangfa Wang.

== Programs ==
BRS requires two years of general secondary education, with the requirement to take the Beijing Education Committee's standard certifying test. Two years of higher level foreign education, with AP, IB or A-Level courses available depending on student preferences.

== Rankings ==
In 2016, the school ranked sixth among mainland Chinese high schools for sending students to top American universities.
