= Beijing City International School =

International private school in Beijing, China

- 北京乐成国际学校
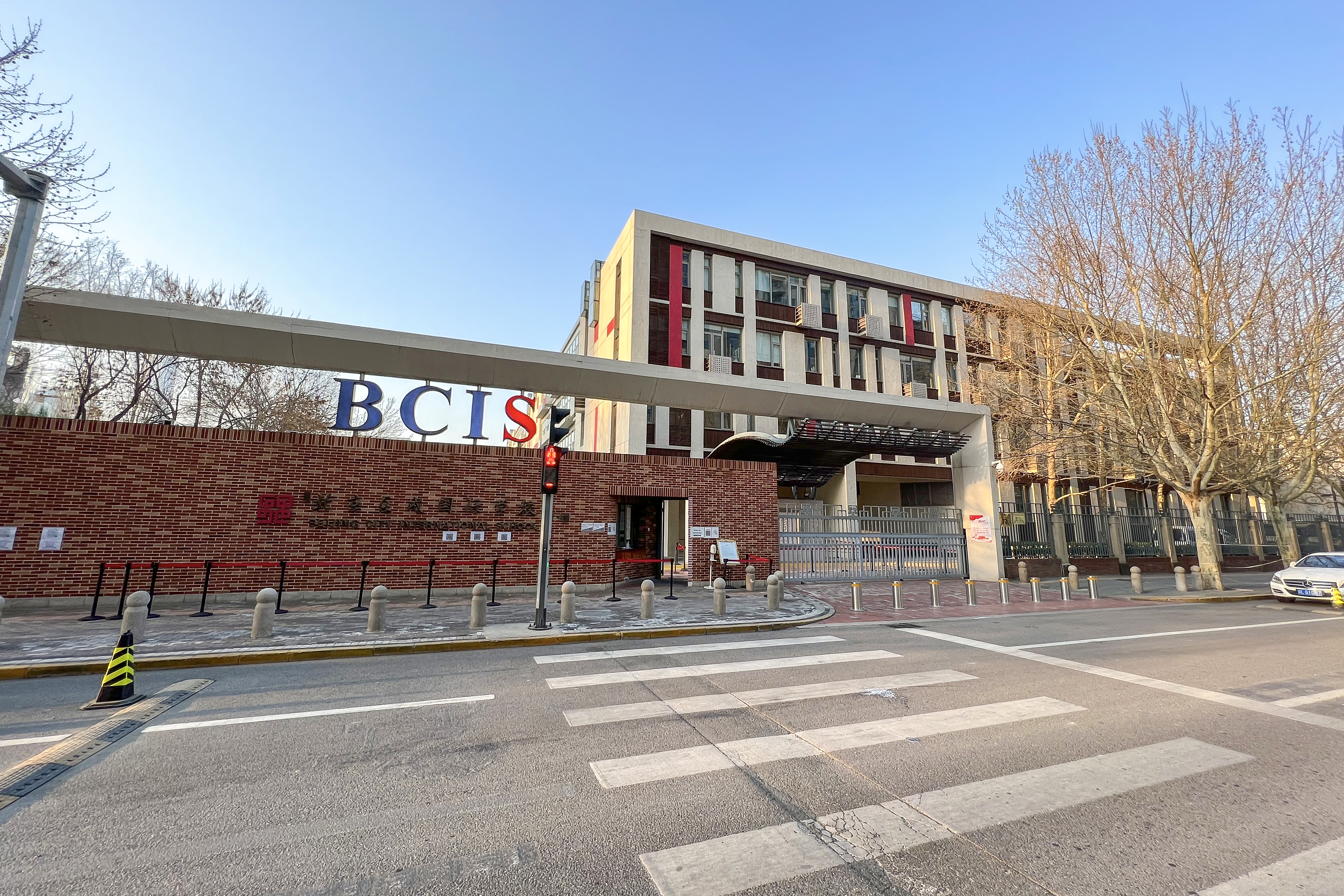
- Entrance of Beijing City International School
- Main Campus: 77 Baiziwan Nan Er Lu; Chaoyang District, Beijing 100022; ECC Campus: 11 Dongbai Street, Chaoyang District, Beijing 100022; CK Campus: No. 6 West Lane, Shuangqiao Street; Chaoyang District, Beijing 100024; People's Republic of China

Information
- Type: IB International school, Private school
- Founded: 2005
- Principal: Jackie Becher (ECC) Suzanne McKemey (CK) Fred Schafer (ES) Lucy Allsopp (MS) Scott Garren (HS)
- Head of school: Tom Egerton
- Grades: Toddler –12
- Gender: Co-educational
- Enrollment: 1,388 (2025-26)
- Campus type: Large Private Campus in CBD
- Colors: Black and Red
- Mascot: LeLe
- Nickname: Warriors
- Website: www.bcis.cn

Beijing City International School (BCIS) (北京乐成学校; Běijīng Yuèchéng Xuéxiào) is an independent co-educational not-for-profit day school offering an international curriculum for toddler to twelfth grade students.

It has gained a spot as a prospective member of the European Council of International Schools (ECIS) and is a regular member of the Council of International Schools (CIS), being accredited by The Western Association of Schools and Colleges (WASC). BCIS is also an IB World school, as well as a member of the Association of China and Mongolia International Schools (ACAMIS). BCIS is fully authorized for the Primary Years Programme (PYP), Middle Years Programme (MYP) and the Diploma Programme (DP) with the International Baccalaureate Organization (IBO).

BCIS has three purpose-built campuses as of January 2026. The first is its 51,000 square meter main campus on Baiziwan Nan Er Rd, which serves as the home base for all students from Grades 1 to 12. Two of the school's three divisions, the Elementary School (Grades 1–5) and the Secondary School, are located on the main campus (Grades 6 to 12). The purpose-built Early Childhood Center (ECC) is located just one kilometer away at No. 11 Dongbai St (adjacent to Shuangjing Bridge) and serves students from Toddler to Kindergarten (age 2 to 6 years). The Courtyard Kindergarten (CK) campus opened in 2019, also serving students from Toddler to Kindergarten (age 2 to 6 years).

BCIS offers enrollment not only to foreign students but also to Chinese national students, as the school is registered with the Education Committee of Chaoyang District.

== History ==
The school opened in 2005 with fewer than 60 students in Kindergarten through Grade 6. The secondary school building opened the following year, with the first graduating class in 2009. BCIS was also an Olympic Model Education School for the 2008 Summer Olympics in Beijing. The school opened a second campus in August 2014, the purpose-built Early Childhood Center (ECC), which is located just 1 km west of the main campus and educates children from Toddler to Kindergarten. In 2016, the ECC was awarded the Gold Standard of Leadership in Energy and Environmental Design (LEED), becoming the first early childhood center to earn an accolade of this kind in Beijing. Originally named YueCheng Courtyard Kindergarten, BCIS Courtyard Kindergarten (CK) was established in 2019, also educating children from Toddler to Kindergarten. The CK campus was designed by MAD Studio and surrounds a centuries-old Beijing quadrangle courtyard.

== Student life ==
=== Student Support Services ===
BCIS provides students with Counseling, Learning Support, and University Guidance services.

=== Library ===
BCIS has four libraries, one in each section of the school, namely the ECC, CK, ES, and SS. Experienced teacher librarians who are also experienced educators staff the libraries. They work with homeroom and subject teachers to incorporate library and information seeking skills into the curriculum, as well as plan and carry out reading and literature appreciation activities. In the ES and ECC libraries, parent zones have been created to provide information and resources about supporting children's personal, social, and emotional development.

=== Athletics & Activities ===
BCIS is a full member of three sports conferences: The International Schools Athletic Conference (ISAC), which operates across Beijing and Tianjin; The Association of China and Mongolia International Schools (ACAMIS), which covers all of China and Mongolia; Junior International Schools Athletics Conference (JISAC), with membership from many international elementary schools in Beijing. Within these conferences, secondary school students have the opportunity to participate in soccer, volleyball, basketball teams over a season of approximately 8 weeks for each sport. There are also one-off tournaments in badminton, table tennis, tennis, cross-country running, golf and track & field athletics. Opportunities also exist for elementary students to enjoy seasons of soccer, European handball, basketball, as well as one-off tournaments for table tennis, badminton, and track & field athletics.

BCIS offers a wide range of extra-curricular activities, some of which are student-initiated and -led. These range from charitable and community clubs, sporting enrichment activities, special interest or cultural groups, as well as arts and music groups.

== Tuition ==
In 2024 the tuition for the year was 290,500 renminbi ($40,137 U.S. dollars).

Tuition Fee Chart - Annual Payment (2024-2025)
Grades	Quoted in RMB	Amount in USD
Toddler	244,000	33,172
Nursery	259,000	35,784
Pre-Kindergarten	279,000	38,548
Kindergarten	279,000	38,548
Grades 1 - 5	290,500	40,137
Grades 6 - 8	310,500	42,900
Grades 9 - 10	322,000	44,489
Grades 11 - 12	332,000	45,870

== Academics ==
BCIS offers all three programs of the International Baccalaureate Organization (IBO) - International Baccalaureate Primary Years Programme (IB PYP), International Baccalaureate Middle Years Programme (IB MYP), IB Diploma Programme (IB DP). Courses at BCIS are taught in English while offering two first language courses: English and Chinese. Second Language includes English, Chinese and Spanish.

Students in their second semester of Grade 10 have the opportunity to decide which diploma they want to pursue in Grade 11 and 12. The choices are the IB Diploma Programme diploma, BCIS' own high school diploma, as well as BCIS's own bespoke pathway known as the IDEATE program.

== Accreditation ==
BCIS is an IB World school that has been approved by the International Baccalaureate to develop and deliver courses under the IB Primary Years Programme, IB Middle Years Programme, and IB Diploma Programme. The Council of International Schools and the Western Association of Schools and Colleges both accredit BCIS (WASC). Because the school is registered with the Education Committee of Chaoyang District, BCIS can accept both foreign and Chinese national students.

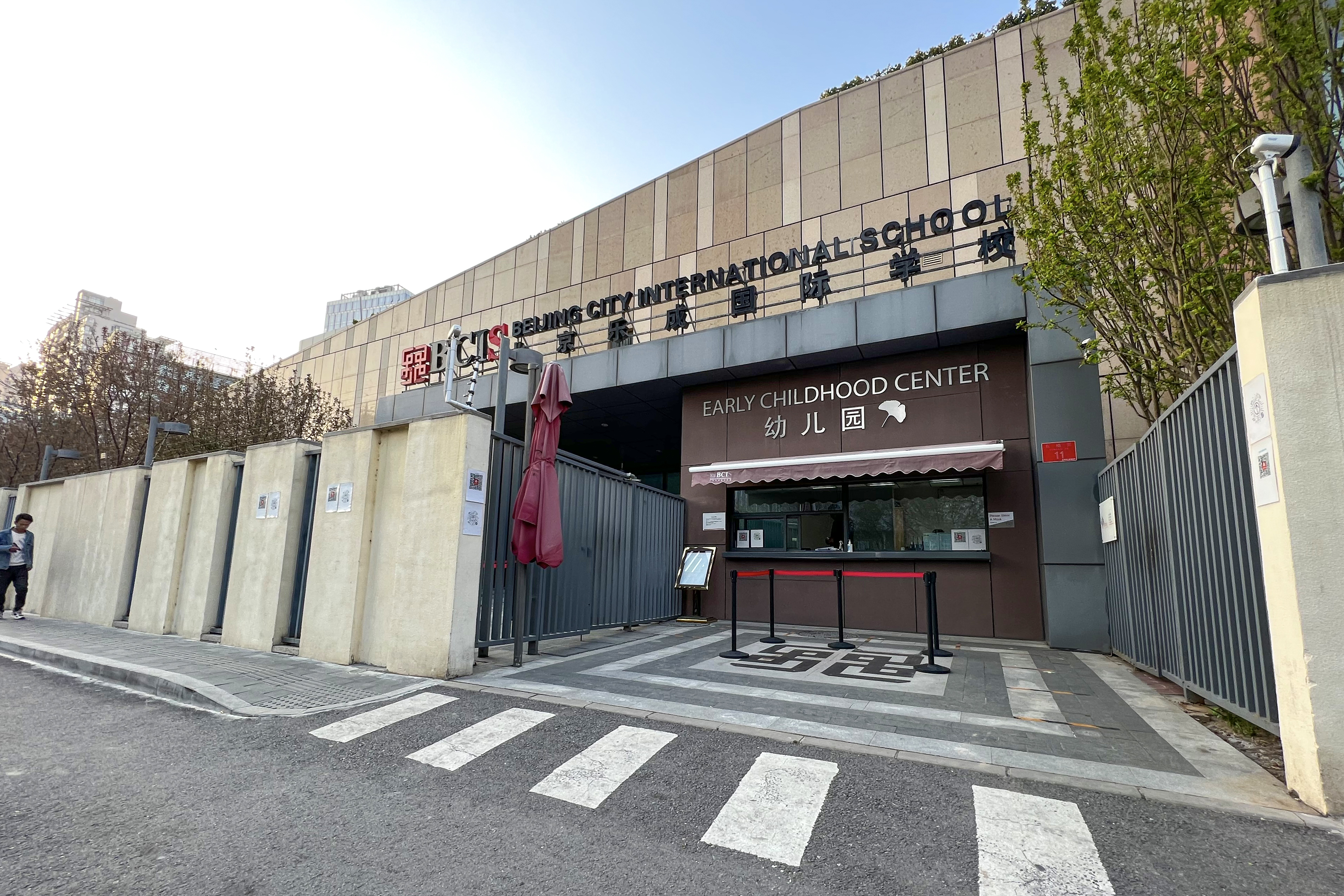
BCIS Early Childhood Center near Shuangjing station
