= Keystone Academy =

Private K-12 school in Shunyi, Beijing, China

- 北京市鼎石学校
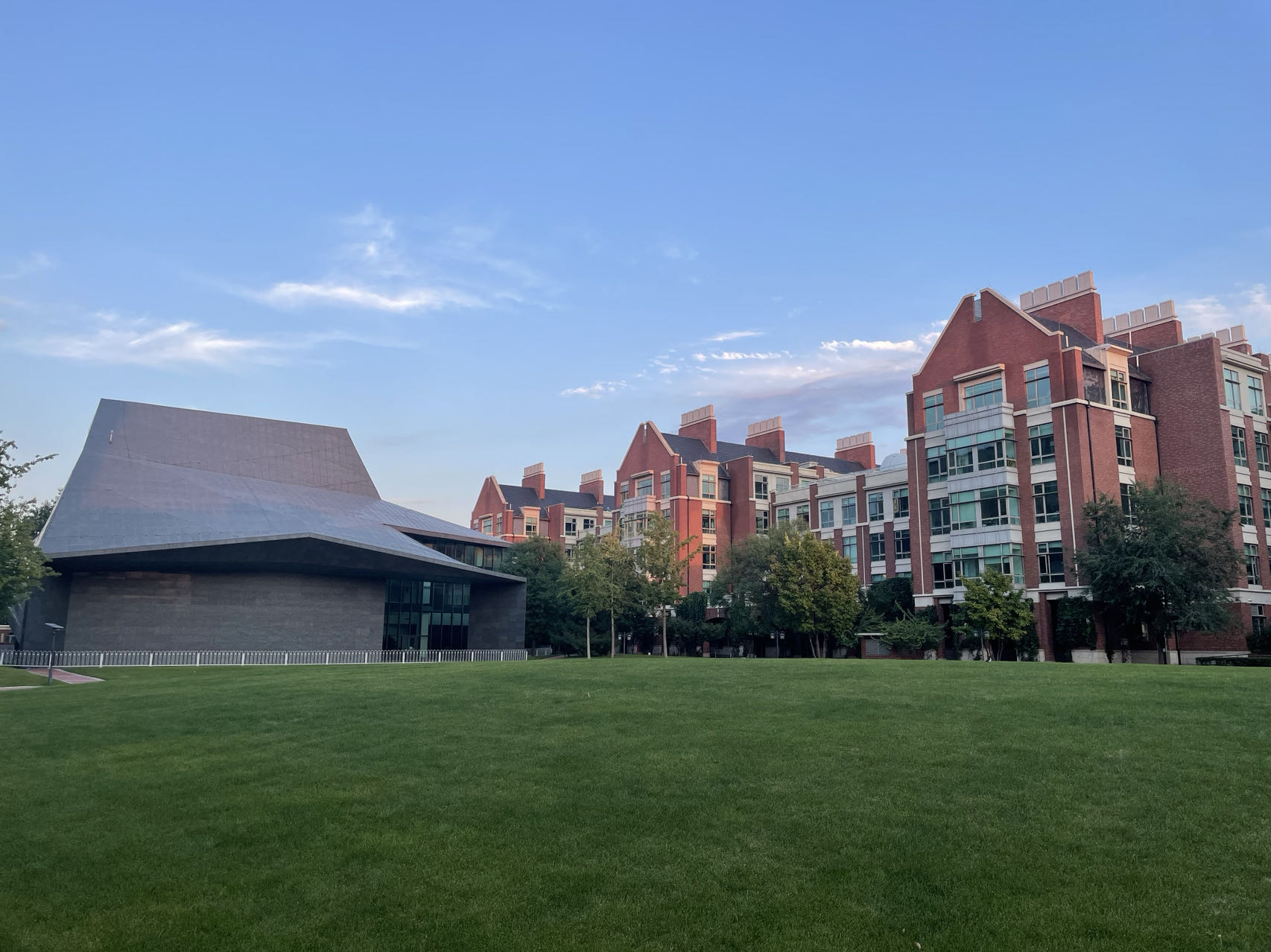
- The school's academic building (right) and the performing arts center (left)

Location
- 11 Anfu Street, Houshayu Town; Shunyi, Beijing 132826; China; 40°06′47″N 116°32′49″E,

Information
- Established: 2014; 12 years ago
- Head of school: Emily McCarren
- Colors: Blue, Red and Grey
- Website: keystoneacademy.cn/en

Keystone Academy
- Chinese: 北京市鼎石学校
- Traditional Chinese: 北京市鼎石學校
Transcriptions
Standard Mandarin
- Hanyu Pinyin: Běijīngshì Dǐngshí Xuéxiào

The Keystone Academy (北京市鼎石学校; alternatively Beijing Dingshi School) is a private K–12 school in Shunyi, Beijing, China. It was founded in 2014. The school offers IB Middle Year Program for Grade 6–10 and IB Diploma Program for Grade 11–12.

Malcolm McKenzie founded Keystone Academy, which opened in 2014. Beijing Meilian Wenhua Investment Co., Ltd. (北京美联文华投资有限公司) was one of the school's investors. According to the school, it employs a curriculum that mimics that of Sidwell Friends School. The Xinhua News Agency said that Keystone Academy charged more than CN¥200,000 (US$31,008) annually for each student, amounting to "four times the disposable income of an average Beijinger in 2015".

== Accreditations ==
Keystone Academy is accredited or a member of the following organizations:

- IB Middle Year Program
- IB Diploma Program
- Round Square, an international network of schools
- Western Association of Schools and Colleges, a K-12 accreditation
- Principals' Training Center for International School
- Association of China and Mongolia International Schools
- International Schools Athletic Conference, a Beijing/Tianjin international schools league.
- East Asia Regional Council of Schools
