= Tsinghua International School =

International school in Haidian, Beijing

- Zhongguancun North Rd. Haidian, Beijing 100084; People's Republic of China

Information
- Type: International School/Private School
- Founded: 2009; 17 years ago
- Principal: Zhu Ying (executive principal), Scott Paré (academic principal)
- Grades: Grade 1-12
- Enrollment: 430
- Campus type: Large private campus
- Colors: Purple, White, Lavender
- Mascot: Spartans
- Newspaper: The Spartan Times
- Website: www.this.edu.cn

Chinese name
- Simplified Chinese: 清华大学附属中学国际部
- Traditional Chinese: 清華大學附屬中學國際部
Transcriptions
Standard Mandarin
- Hanyu Pinyin: Qīnghuá Dàxué Fùshǔ Zhōngxué Guójìbù

Tsinghua International School (THIS, Chinese: 清华大学附属中学国际部) is a for-profit, WASC-accredited international school in Beijing, that was founded in 2009. THIS is attached to one of Beijing's top public secondary schools, Tsinghua Fuzhong. Tsinghua Fuzhong is the secondary school affiliated to Tsinghua University. THIS shares some facilities with Tsinghua Fuzhong, but remains an independent school. As of the 2025-26 school year they have around 530 students in grades 1-12.

THIS is in the Advanced Placement program and its courses are derived from the Common Core State Standards Initiative. The colleges attended by alumni are impressive for a small school, including names like Columbia University, Brown University and MIT.

== Facilities ==
THIS has an elementary school, middle school, and high school. They recently finished the construction of their teaching building with modern classrooms and science labs. In addition, the school just finished construction of an indoor gym. Other facilities include:

- Classrooms
- Library
- Science laboratories
- Cafeteria
- Athletics track
- Basketball courts
- Soccer field
- Computer labs
- Soundproof music studio
- Drama studio
- Black Box Theatre
- Teachers' lounge
- Computer lab
- New Multi-story Gym

== High school program ==
The US-based high school curriculum prepares students for colleges in the United States, Canada, and other western countries. Multiple advanced placement courses such as AP World History, AP English Language and Composition, and AP Physics are available, while new courses are being introduced in the future.

=== Selection for high school courses ===
- English/Language Arts
- Chinese
- Social Studies
- Visual Arts and Performing Arts
- Foreign Languages and Linguistics
- Mathematics
- Physical Sciences
- Computer Technology
- Physical Education and Health

=== Selection for high school AP courses ===
- AP Physics I
- AP Physics II
- AP Calculus AB/BC
- AP Macroeconomics
- AP US History
- AP World History
- AP Psychology
- AP Human Geography
- AP Computer Science Principles
- AP Computer Science Applications
- AP Statistics
- AP Chemistry
- AP Biology
- AP English Language and Composition
- AP LIT
- AP Chinese
- AP Environmental Science

== Student life ==
=== Extracurricular activities ===
THIS teachers provide a variety of after-school extracurricular activities for all elementary school, middle school, and high school students. Activities, including sports, are held every day from 3:30 to 5:30.

THIS is a member of ISAC (International Schools Athletic Conference). Middle school and high school extracurricular activities include:

- Game Programming Engineering (GPE) Club
- AI Club
- ADA Club
- Philosophy Club
- Aerospace Club
- Dance Club
- Rock/Pop band
- Robotics Club
- Choir Club
- Community Service Club
- Speech and Debate Club
- Model United Nations (MUN)
- Engineering Club
- Woodworking Club
- SciNex (Science Club)
- Middle School Math Club
- High School Math Club
- Traditional Dance Club
- Fashion Design Club
- Theatre
- The Student Council (STUCO)
- English Newspaper, The Spartan Times
- Chinese Newspaper ‘清音’
- Visual Art Club

=== Dining service ===
The catering services at THIS provide breakfast, lunch, and dinner for middle school students, high school students, and faculty members. They serve a variety of reasonably priced dishes. Some dishes include noodles, Japanese tofu, and stir-fried rice. The school also takes suggestions from parents regarding changes to the variety of food and drinks served to the students. Most notably this included the banning of boba tea when parents raised concerns over "choking hazards".

Elementary students have lunch prepared for them beforehand and are given morning snacks every day.

=== Transportation service ===
Daily school buses at designated pick-up points before and after school are provided for elementary school, middle school, and high school students. THIS has eleven bus routes for students to choose from across Beijing.

== See also ==
- Tsinghua University
