= Beijing World Youth Academy =

School in Laiguangying, Beijing, China

Coordinates: 40.0224°N 116.4386°E

- Chinese: 北京朝阳区世青学校
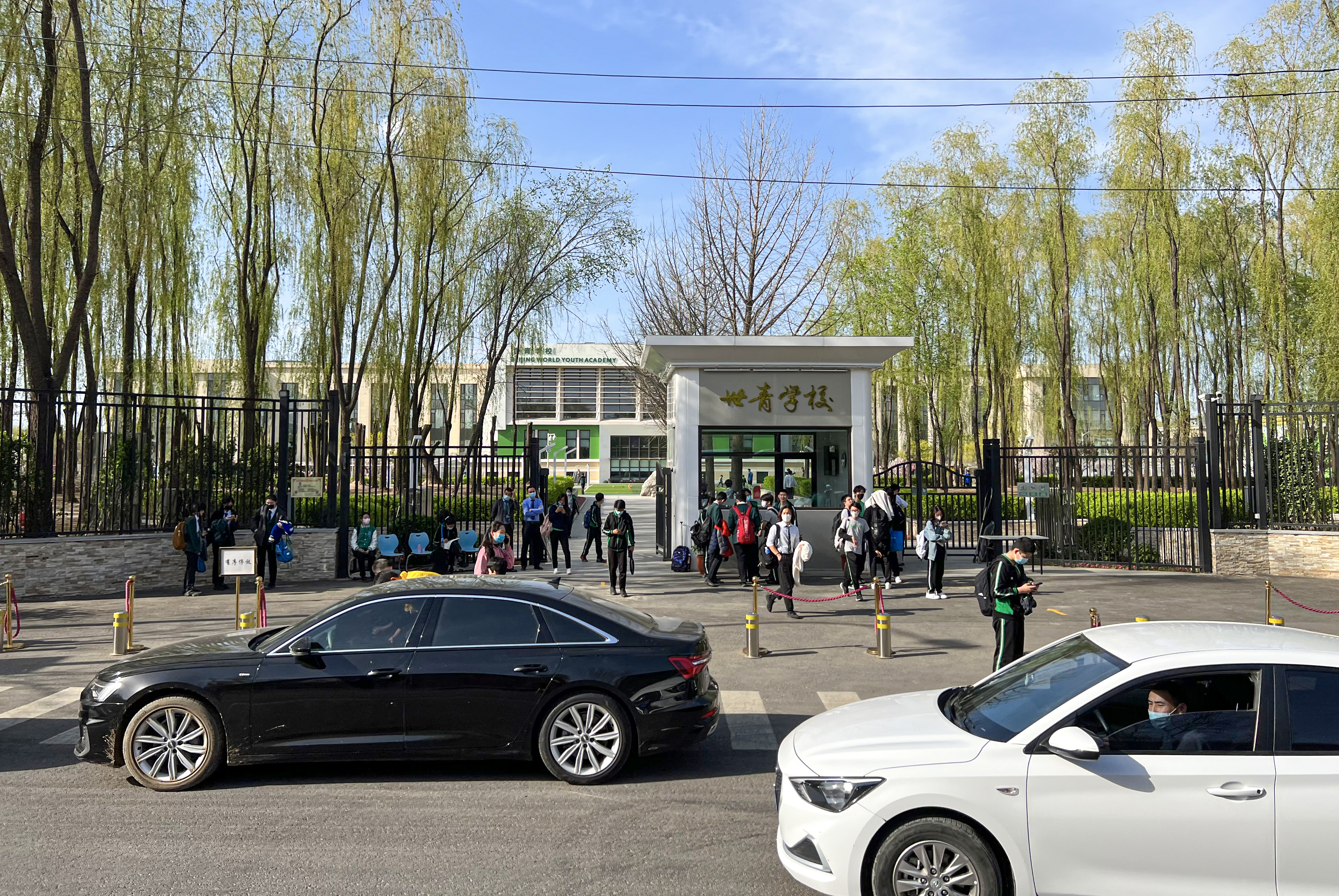
- Main campus of BWYA

Information
- Motto: Locally Grounded, Globally Aware (立足本土，放眼全球)
- Established: 2001; 25 years ago
- Founder: Ms. Wang Hong (王虹）
- Grades: K-12
- Enrollment: c.1240
- Color: Green
- Mascot: Wolf
- Publication: Wolf Bites (video series) The Magazine (magazine) psb
- Website: www.ibwya.net

Beijing World Youth Academy (Chinese: 北京朝阳区世青学校, romanized: Běijīng cháoyáng qū shì qīng xuéxiào), or BWYA, is an international school that serves students from Kindergarten to Grade 12 located at Laiguangying of Beijing, China.

== History ==
The school was founded in 2001.

The school moved to its current campus in 2021.

== Structure ==
The primary curriculum offered is International Baccalaureate (IB), with the Primary Years Program (PYP) offered from grades 1 to 5, the Middle Years Program (MYP) from grades 6 to 10 and the Diploma Program (DP) offered in grades 11 and 12. The Cambridge International General Certificate of Secondary Education (IGCSE) is also provided in G10.

The school has over 1240 students and teachers from over 60 countries and regions. More than 200 Chinese and foreign students have been admitted to universities such as Harvard, Cornell, Princeton and Stanford, and more than 400 foreign students have been admitted to Chinese universities such as Peking University, Tsinghua University and Renmin University.

== Academic Performance ==
Beijing World Youth Academy has a reputation for high test scores, with a few students achieving an IB score of 45 out of 45 almost every year and an average of 37 in 2020 compared to the world average of 30 at the time.

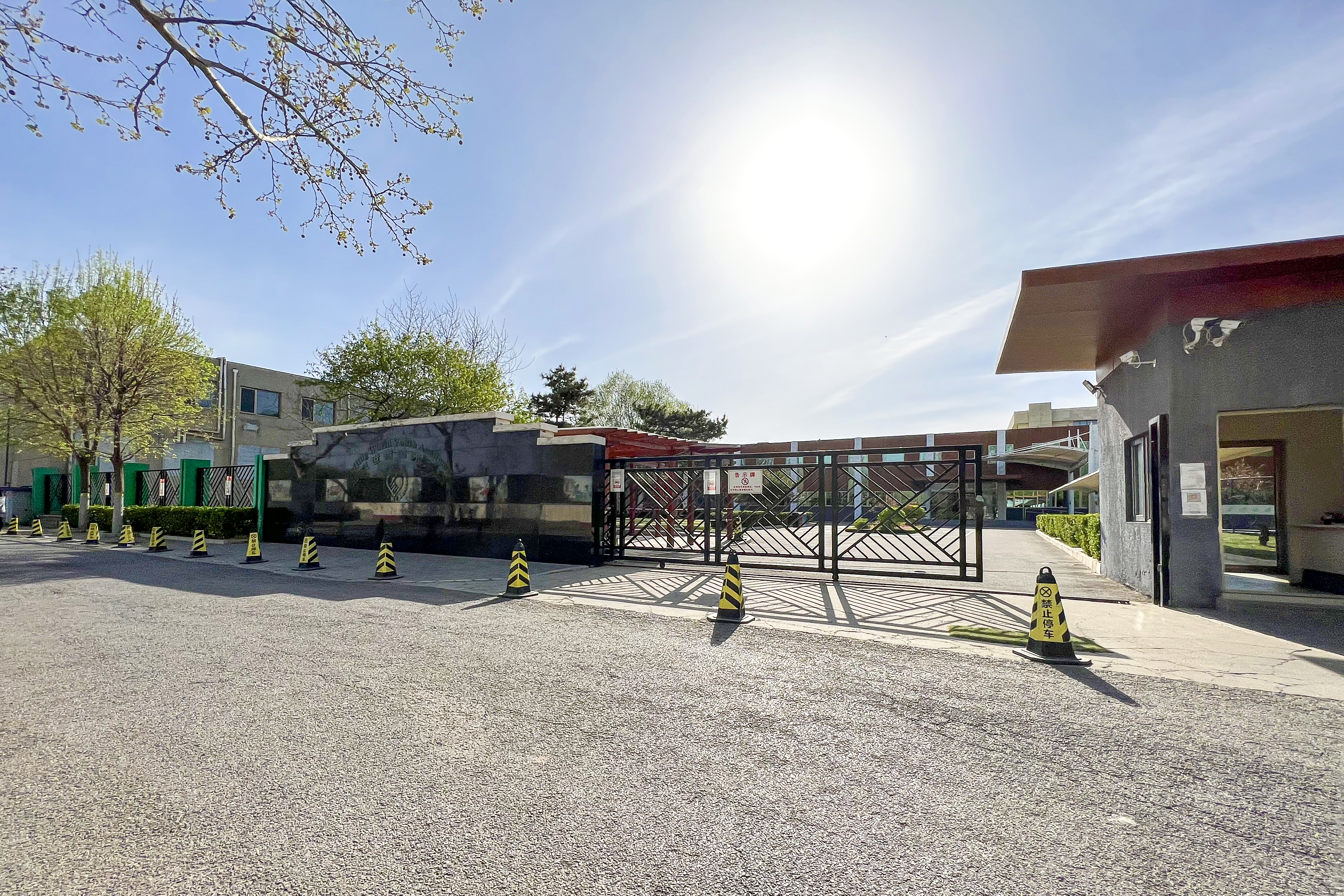
East campus of BWYA

== Clubs ==
Beijing World Youth Academy offers many student-led and teacher-led clubs, some of the popular and long-lasting clubs are the following:

Model United Nations Club (Student-Led), students investigate world issues and participate in debates that involve many other schools.

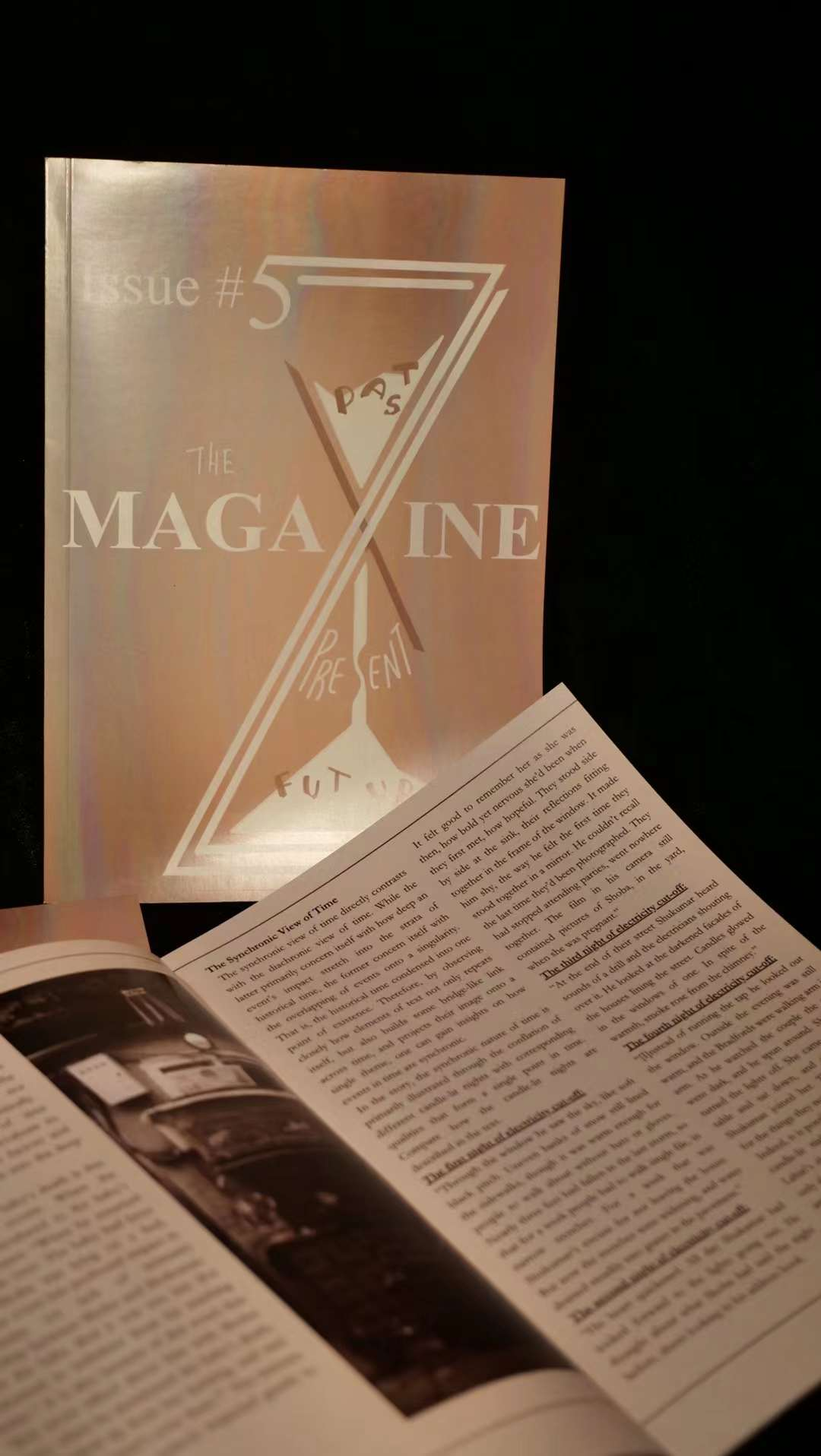
Issue 5 (2023) of: THE MAGAZINE

Wolfs Robotics (Student-Led and teacher-led), BWYA currently has two robotics clubs, one being the teacher-led Lego Robotics where students can prepare and compete in the FIRST LEGO League Competition (FLL), and the student-led MATE ROV underwater robotics club started in 2023 where students prepare and partake in the international MATE ROV competition.(closed in 2025)

== Internal Media ==
The two major internal media platforms are a weekly student-run video series named "Wolf Bites" and the school magazine named "The Magazine".
