= Saint Paul American School =

Private school in Beijing, China

Saint Paul American School Beijing
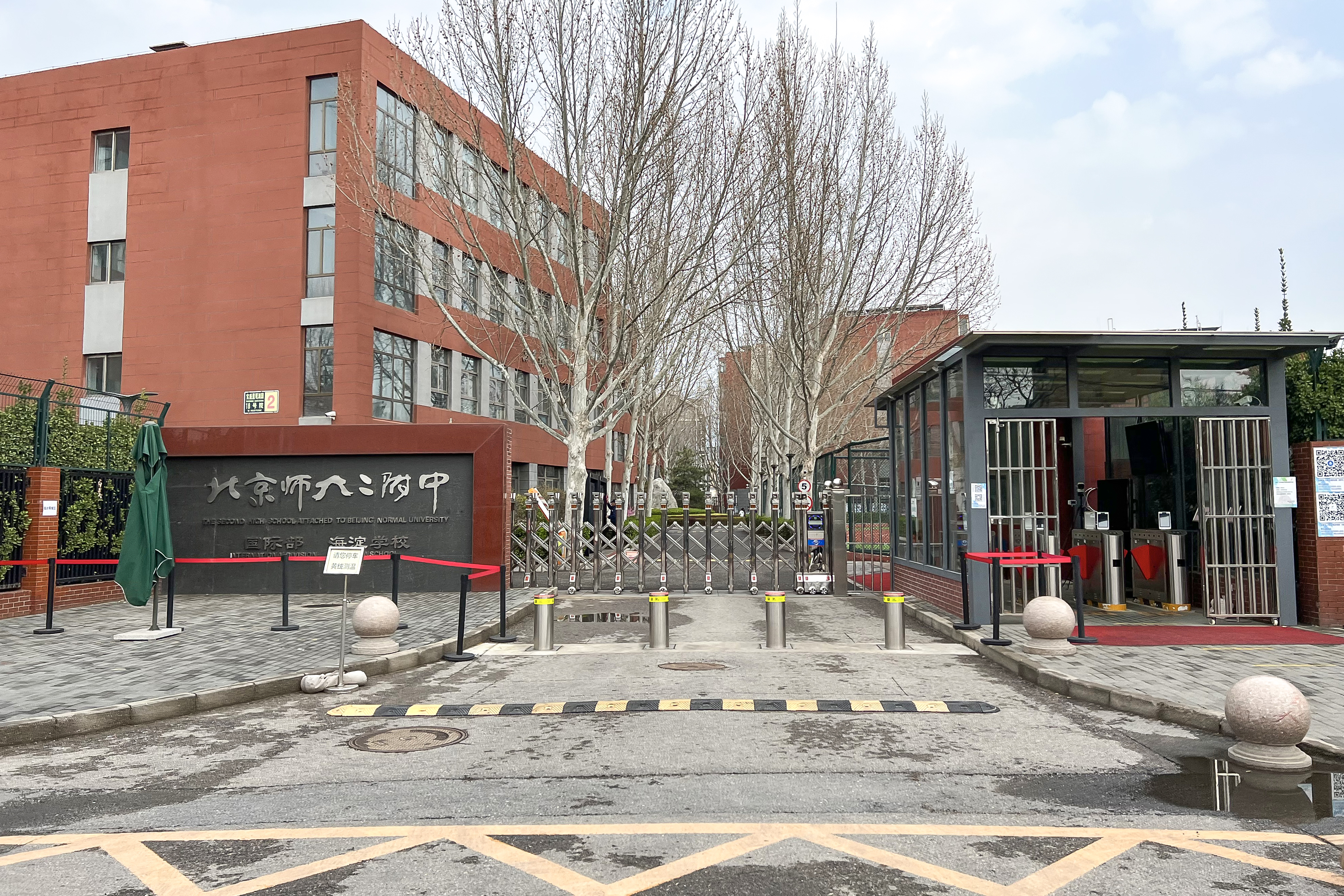

Location
- 18 Guan'ao Yuan, Qinghe, Haidian District; Beijing; China

Information
- School type: Private
- Founded: 2007
- Head of school: Principal Roger Russell
- Gender: Coeducational
- Enrollment: 70-80
- Campus: Urban
- Colors: Maroon and gold
- Athletics conference: Beijing Area Sports Exchange (BASE)
- Mascot: Bear
- Website: stpaulamerican.org

Saint Paul American School
- Simplified Chinese: 北京圣保罗美国学校
- Traditional Chinese: 北京聖保羅美國學校
Transcriptions
Standard Mandarin
- Hanyu Pinyin: Běijīng Shèngbǎoluó Měiguó Xuéxiào

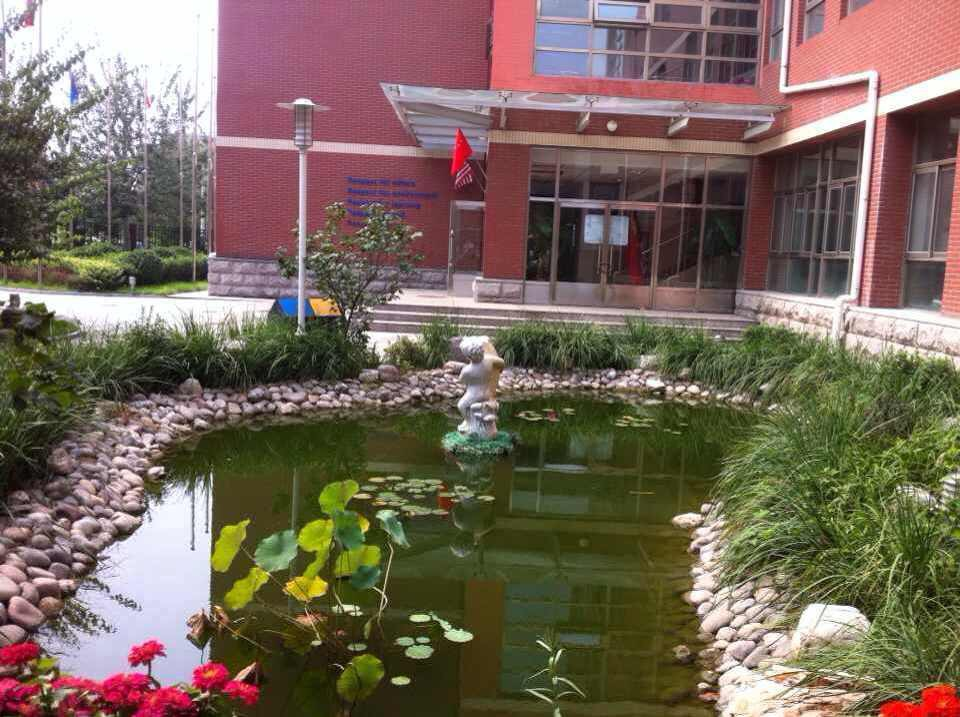

Saint Paul American School Beijing (SPAS; Chinese: 北京圣保罗美国学校) is a defunct private English-language boarding school (de facto education program and part of the Second High School Attached to Beijing Normal University, or SHSBNU) in Haidian District, Beijing, aimed at grades 7-12 students from the expatriate community of Beijing, and international exchange students.

St. Paul American School is part of the Nacel International School System, with sister schools in the United States, Korea, Philippines, and France. Students receive courses in Chinese language, culture, and history taught in conjunction with SHSBNU in addition to US curriculum instruction in English leading to a Saint Paul American School diploma (Nacel International School System). The dual diploma gives students the chance to learn in the American educational system while also learning about Chinese history, culture, and language.

In November 2022, the school administration announced that it would suspend operations for at least one year due to inability of recruiting new students due to the COVID-19 pandemic. As of August 2023, the school has ceased to function.

== Academics ==
Saint Paul American School offers a variety of courses designed for each grade and English level. Independent studies are available with a pre-approved written plan, teacher, and principal approval. All students are placed in their classes according to their grade and English ability.

- Mathematics: Pre-Algebra, Algebra, Geometry, Algebra 2, Pre-Calculus, and (AP) Calculus
- Social studies: Middle School Social Studies, American Government, Geography, US History, World History, Economics, Social Issues, Current Events
- Science: General Science, Physical Science, Biology, Anatomy, Environmental Science, (AP)Chemistry, (AP) Physics
- Language arts: English Composition, Academic Writing, Communication Skills, Speech, American Literature, World Literature, Creative Writing
- Electives: Information Technology (IT), Digital Art, Web Development, Art, Music, Drama, Beginning Band, Symphonic Band, Health, Physical Education, College Preparation
- Chinese classes: Chinese 1, Chinese 2, Chinese 3, Chinese 4, Chinese 5, Chinese 6, HSK 3, HSK 4, HSK 5, HSK 6, AP Chinese
- Test preparation: Intensive English I, Intensive English II, TOEFL Preparation, SAT Preparation

The program has registered for a separate CEEB School Code from that shared by the SHSBNU Gaokao campus and Project Global Access, another program in the international division. This allows for an American curriculum to be presented to college representatives, and provides SPAS students an advantage in college application.

== Staff and student body ==
The program has 22 international teachers, 12 Chinese teachers, an American principal, and English speaking office/dormitory staff members. Currently, it hosts about 300 students from nearly 20 different countries and regions, including the Australia, Brazil, Central African Republic - CAR, China, Congo, Equatorial Guinea, Germany, Hong Kong SAR, Italy, Japan, Kazakhstan, Lithuania, Mexico, Nigeria, Russia, Slovakia, South Korea, Tajikistan, Thailand, Uzbekistan and the United States.

== Facilities ==
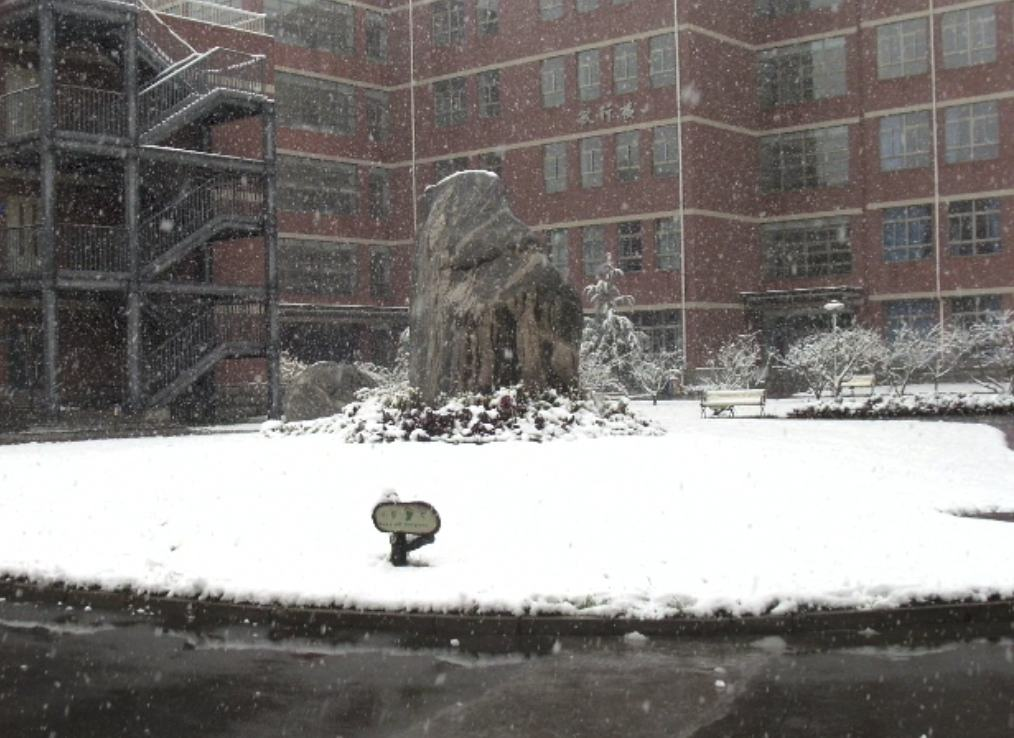
SHSBNU Qinghe campus after snow.

SPAS belongs to the Qinghe campus of the Second High School Attached to Beijing Normal University (SHSBNU). This campus, located just to the north of Beijing Olympic Forest Park, is home to several boarding school programs (collectively the International Division of SHSBNU, including SPAS) and a public middle school program. Facilities on campus include two dormitory buildings, library, laboratories, computer and technology center, full-sized gym, a Chinese and an international cafeteria and more. An outdoor multi-purpose court with a running track, basketball courts, and soccer field is accessible to students.

== See also ==
Saint Paul American School

- Second High School Attached to Beijing Normal University
- St. Paul American School - Clark
