= Springboard International Bilingual School =

School in Beijing, China

- 君诚国际双语学校
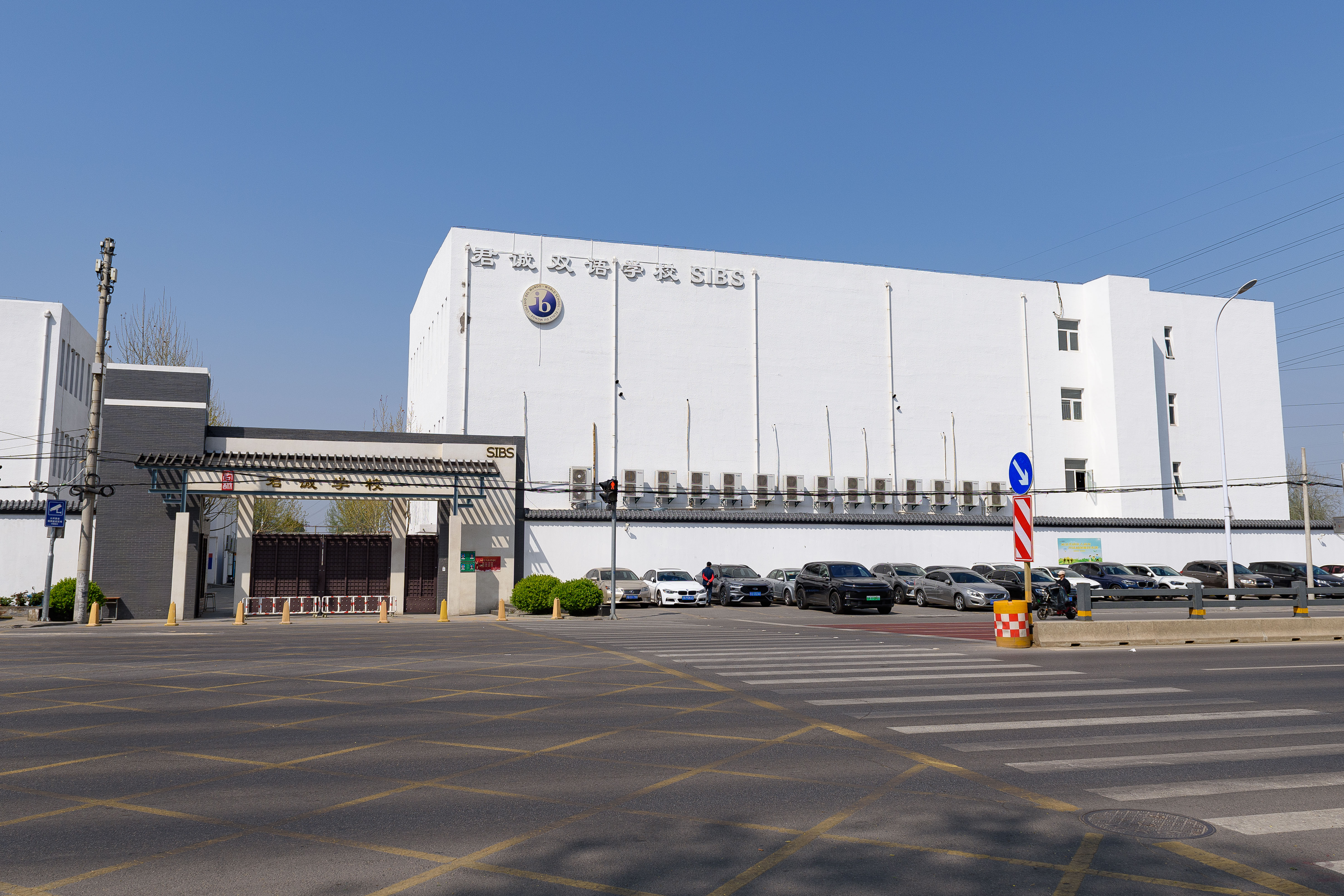

Information
- School type: International school
- Website: www.sibs.com.cn/index.asp

Springboard International Bilingual School (SIBS; Chinese: 君诚国际双语学校) is an international school in Gucheng Village (古城村), Houshayu Town, Shunyi District, Beijing, China. It has kindergarten, lower primary, upper primary, and secondary (middle and high school) divisions.
