= Beijing International Bilingual Academy =

- 海嘉国际双语学校

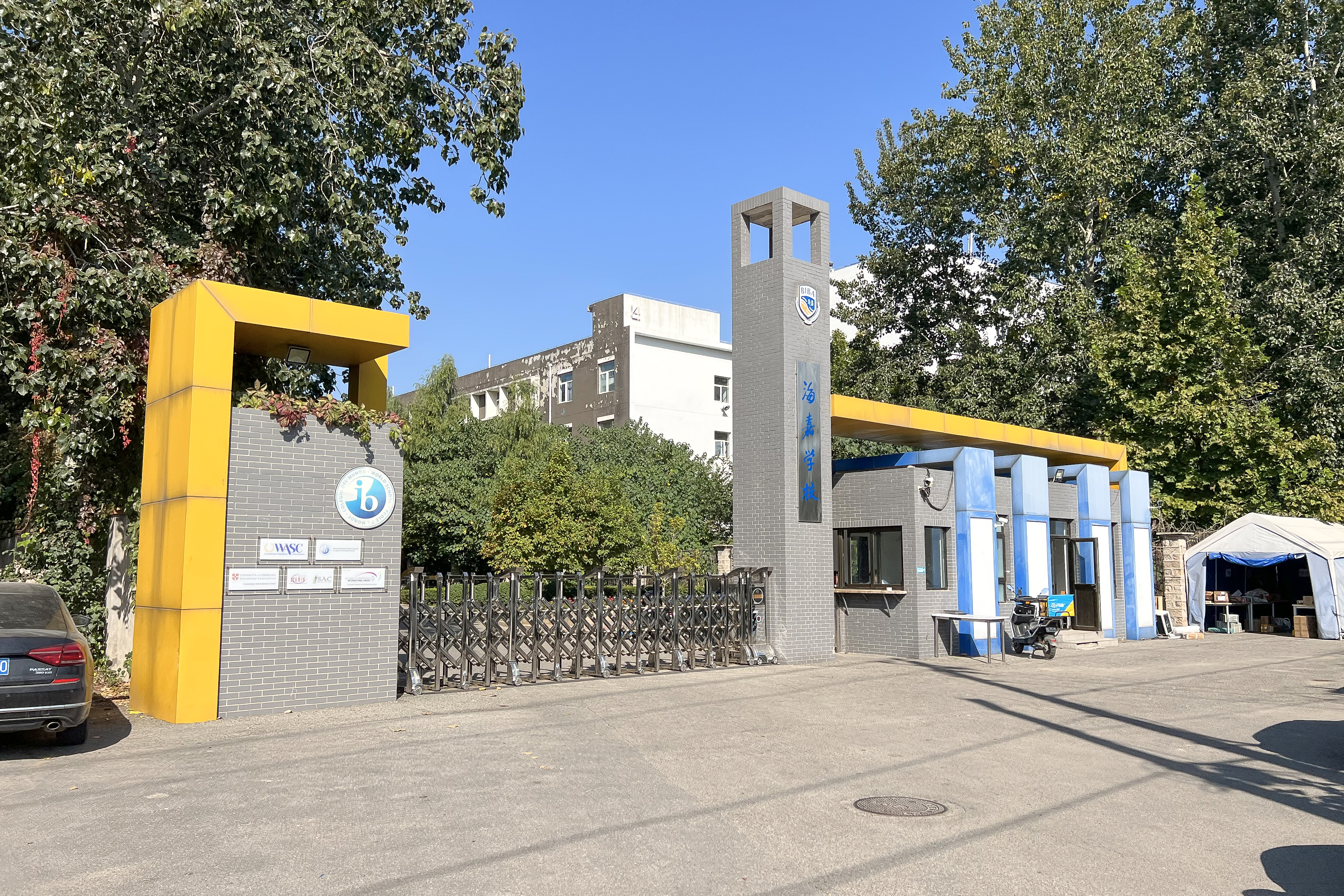

Location
- Building 11, No. 5 Yumin Road Houshayu, Shunyi; Beijing 101300; China

Information
- School type: Private, Day School
- Founded: 2006
- Head of school: Ouyang Hua and Dr. Michael Bevis
- Staff: More than 300
- Grades: Preschool-12
- Enrolment: 1600
- Average class size: 20
- Campus type: Suburb
- Mascot: Leopards
- Newspaper: BIBA Dispatch
- Website: www.bibachina.org

Beijing International Bilingual Academy (BIBA; Chinese: 海嘉国际双语学校, lit. "Haijia International Bilingual School") is a private school in Shunyi District, Beijing, China. It serves students from kindergarten to high school. BIBA first opened its doors in 2006 as Kinstar International School. The school's name was changed to Beijing International Bilingual Academy in 2011. It admits students who are Chinese nationals or holders of foreign passports. BIBA is a member of EduChina. It currently has 1600 students from more than 30 countries.

== Accreditations and authorizations ==
BIBA is accredited, authorized, or a member of the following organizations:

- The International Middle Years Curriculum (IMYC)
- Cambridge International General Certificate of Secondary Education (IGCSE)
- The International Baccalaureate Diploma Program (IBDP)
- Association of China and Mongolia International Schools (ACAMIS)
- International Schools Athletic Conference (ISAC)
- East Asia Regional Council of Schools (EARCOS)
- Principals' Training Center for International School (PTC)
- Western Association of Schools and Colleges (WASC), a K-12 Accreditation

== Campuses ==
The BIBA group has three campuses around China, in Beijing, Tianjin and Guiyang. Originally named BIBA, TIBA and GIBA, they were later collectively renamed to BIBA.
