= Beijing BISS International School =

- 北京BISS国际学校
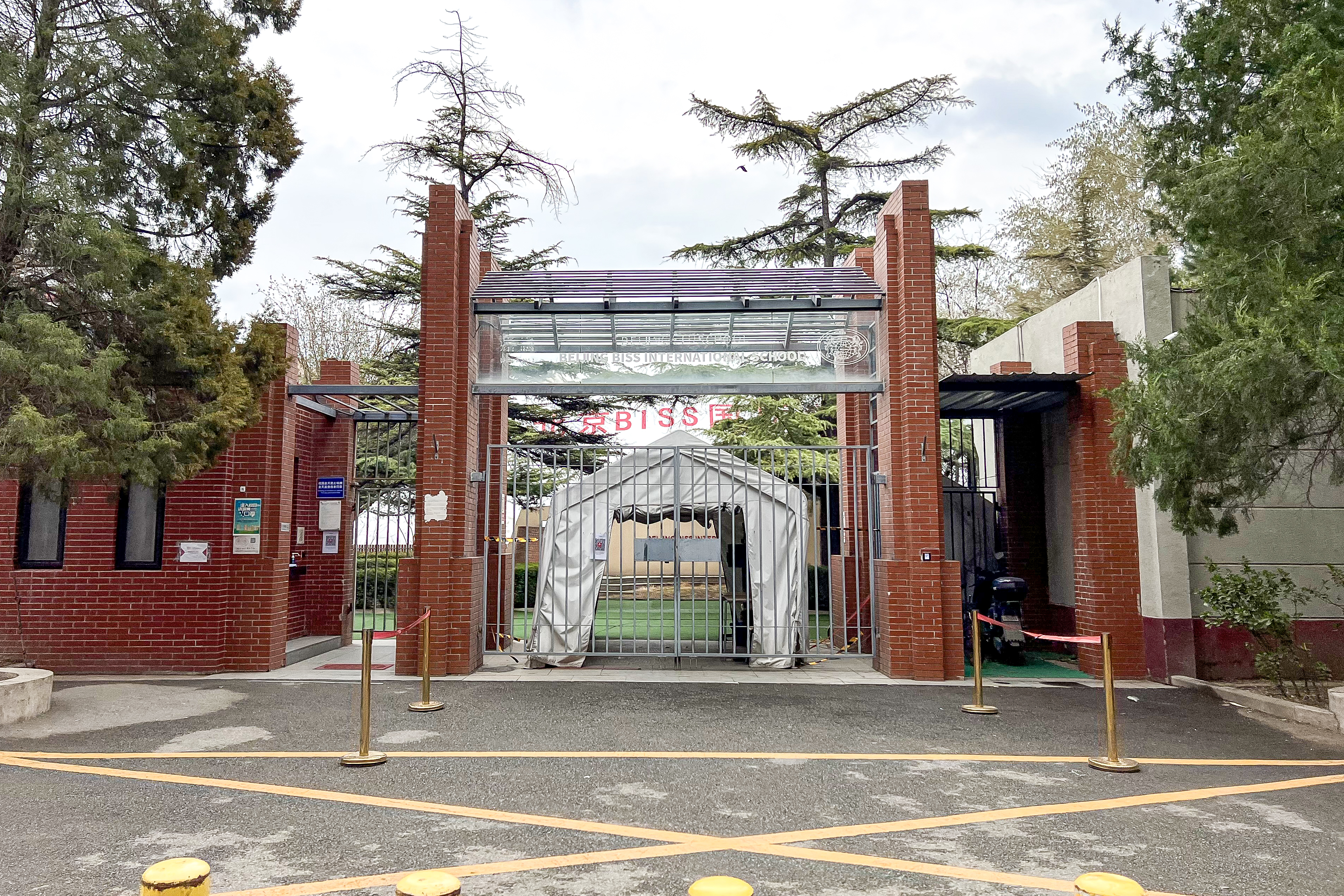

Location
- No. 17, Area 4, An Zhen Xi Li; Chaoyang District; Beijing, 100029; China

Information
- Type: Independent school
- Founded: 1994
- Head of school: Randal Eplin
- Grades: Pre K-12
- Language: English
- Campus size: 11,000 square metres (120,000 ft^{2})
- Colour: Maroon
- Accreditation: International Baccalaureate (IB)
- Affiliation: EARCOS, ACAMIS
- Website: www.biss.com.cn

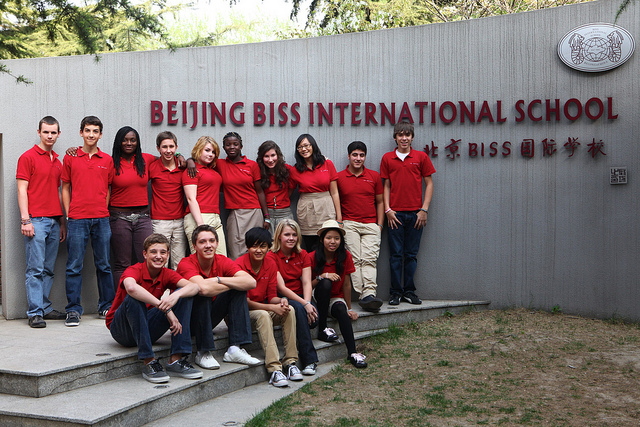
School sign

Beijing BISS International School (BISS) (simplified Chinese: 北京BISS国际学校; traditional Chinese: 北京BISS國際學校; pinyin: Běijīng BISS Guójì Xuéxiào) was an independent co-educational English-language day school located in Chaoyang District, Beijing, People's Republic of China.

Founded in 1994, educates kindergarten through grade 12 students from Beijing's expatriate community through all three International Baccalaureate (IB) programs: the Primary Years Programme, the Middle Years Programme, and the Diploma Programme. The school had 340 students from 40 different nationalities as of 2012.

== History ==
Beijing BISS International School was founded in 1994 by its sister school, the International School Singapore (ISS), as an independent proprietary, co-educational, English-language day school offering an international curriculum to students from Kindergarten to grade 12 from Beijing's expatriate community. BISS was the first International School licensed by The Beijing Educational Commission, and the first school in Beijing to offer all three IB programs.

In 2018 the school temporary closed for two days, citing financial issues.

Following these financial issues, educational groups such as the Etu Education Group (一土学校) attempted to reach agreements with BISS, but to no avail.

BISS closed its doors on December 15, 2023, due to finance-related issues.

== Program ==
=== Curriculum ===
BISS offers the Primary Years Programme (PYP), Middle Years Programme (MYP) and Diploma Programme (DP) to all students, from kindergarten through grade 12.

=== Accreditations, Authorizations, Memberships and Licences ===
- Authorized by the International Baccalaureate (IB): BISS was the first school in Beijing and one of the first in China to be authorized to offer all three IB programs
- Accredited by the National Centre for School Curriculum and Textbook Development (NCCT)
- Licensed by the Beijing Education Commission
- Member of the Association of China and Mongolia International Schools
- Member of the East Asia Regional Council of Schools

== Students ==
BISS provided instruction for kindergarten to grade 12 students from the expatriate community of Beijing. As of 2012, 340 students from 40 different nationalities attend the school.

=== Class sizes ===
BISS maintained a relatively low student to teacher class ratios, with classes typically having 15 students or less to 1 teacher. Luo Wangshu of the Shanghai Daily reported that "BISS believes that smaller class sizes make for better academic performance and communication."

== Faculty ==
BISS faculty members hail from the United States, Canada, Australia, Korea, New Zealand, Singapore, China, Japan, the Philippines, Portugal, and the U.K. In 2017, Search Associates, the most reputable international schools' recruitment agency disassociated itself from BISS because of unpaid fees. As a result, BISS now recruits most of its faculty through its website.

== Tuition ==
As of 2009 the school tuition ranges from lower for kindergarteners to higher for older students. Kindergarteners each had a tuition of 96,000 yuan (49,217 Malaysian ringgits) while a high school senior had a tuition of 172,000 yuan (RM88,181). For kindergarten and first grade classes, as of 2012 the school charged up to 109,800 yuan yearly per pupil. In 2015 the tuition for the year was 300,000 renminbi ($48,330 U.S. dollars). China Daily ranked BISS as the most expensive private school in Beijing.

== Controversy ==
=== 2018 ===
In 2017, In response to ongoing non-payment of staff salaries and entitlements BISS teachers went on strike on September 20, 2018. Some current and former staff were owed as much as 120,000 yuan. Teachers wrote parents a letter stating that "Faculty contracts have not been honored and wages, health insurance, and housing allowances have not been paid". It was also reported that Chen Guoqiang (陈国强) had stopped responding to messages.

Following this, the Beijing Municipal Commission of Education successfully contacted Chen Guoqiang - the actual owner of the school - who vowed to pay all the delayed wages by 5PM, September 28, but officials soon lost contact with the individual.

On September 28, a Beijing News reporter station outside the school reported that around 30 parents and 10 faculty gathered in the lobby, and that Chen Guoqiang had not arrived as promised. Following this development, the Beijing Municipal Education Commission, Chaoyang Education Commission, BISS Head of School Randel Eplin worked in tandem to reach a solution.

Many educational groups and companies soon attempted obtain the operating rights to the school via the Education Commission, but none were successful.

=== 2022 ===
After a 5-year hiatus, BISS announced their re-opening with a tuition reduction plan. Boasting the name of a reputable international school and offering discounted tuition, the school quickly returned.

A subsequent report revealed that besides the investor being Singaporean, the school itself now had little to no relations to Singapore, and was inferior in terms of education quality.

When school started in September, parents discovered that the new campus had not completed construction, and students were sent to nearby schools in Huangshan instead; on top of this, children starting from 1st grade needed to board.

A year later, BISS announced that they would again be closing on December 15, withholding Parents' 20,000 CNY deposits.
