= British School of Beijing =

Coordinates: 39.94343°N 116.44736°E

The British School of Beijing
- 北京英国学校

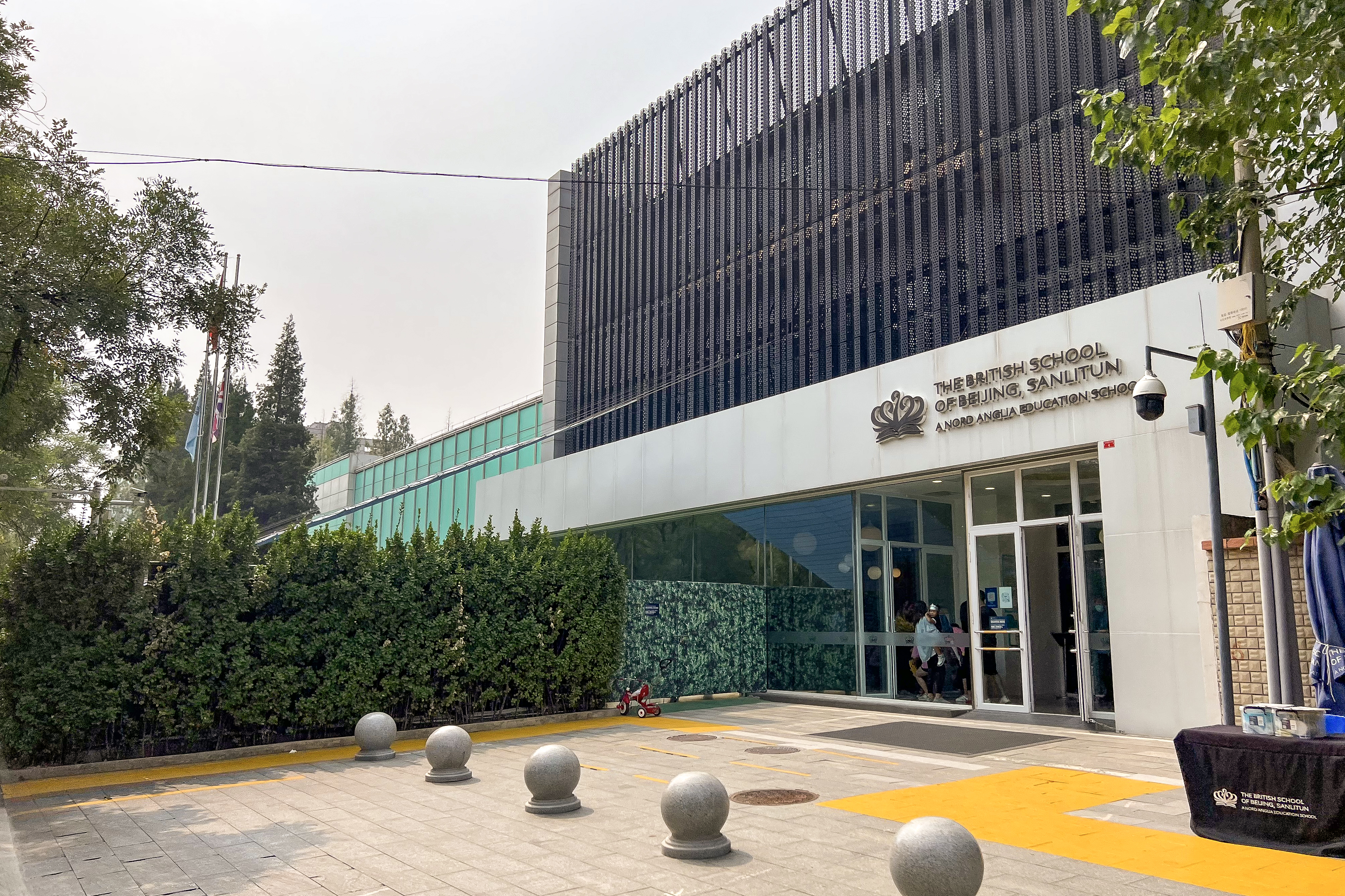
- BSB Sanlitun in 2022

Location
- No. 5 Xiliujie, Sanlitun Road [Sanlitun] No. 9 An Hua Street [Shunyi] Beijing, China

Information
- School type: School for children of foreign personnel
- Established: 21 October 2004
- Founder: Nord Anglia Education
- Status: Sanlitun Opened October 2003, Shunyi Opened 2005
- Principal: Joanne Prabhu [Sanlitun], Bevan Graham [Shunyi]
- Age: 18 months to 18 yrs
- Enrollment: Maximum Capacity 700[Sanlitun], 1500[Shunyi]
- Website: The British School of Beijing

The British School of Beijing (北京英国学校) is a private school for children of foreign personnel in Beijing, China.

The company Nord Anglia Education operates two school campuses in Beijing: one in Shunyi and the other in Sanlitun, Chaoyang. The Shunyi campus took pupils from 18 months through to 18 years of age, and the Sanlitun campus is for students from the ages of 2 to 11.

== History ==
The school was founded in 2003. It was originally intended to open in September 2004, but it actually opened on 29 March 2004.

Originally both Nord Anglia campuses in Beijing, Shunyi and Sanlitun, were operated as a single school, The British School of Beijing. In 2013 they were administratively made into separate institutions.

BSB, as of 2013, sends teachers to rural China to help area Chinese students, and teachers from rural China go to BSB to get assistance. The Chinese central government had selected BSB for this role.

== Curriculum ==
Students in the primary levels study Mandarin Chinese and may choose to take a second foreign language. Secondary students must study Mandarin and another foreign language.

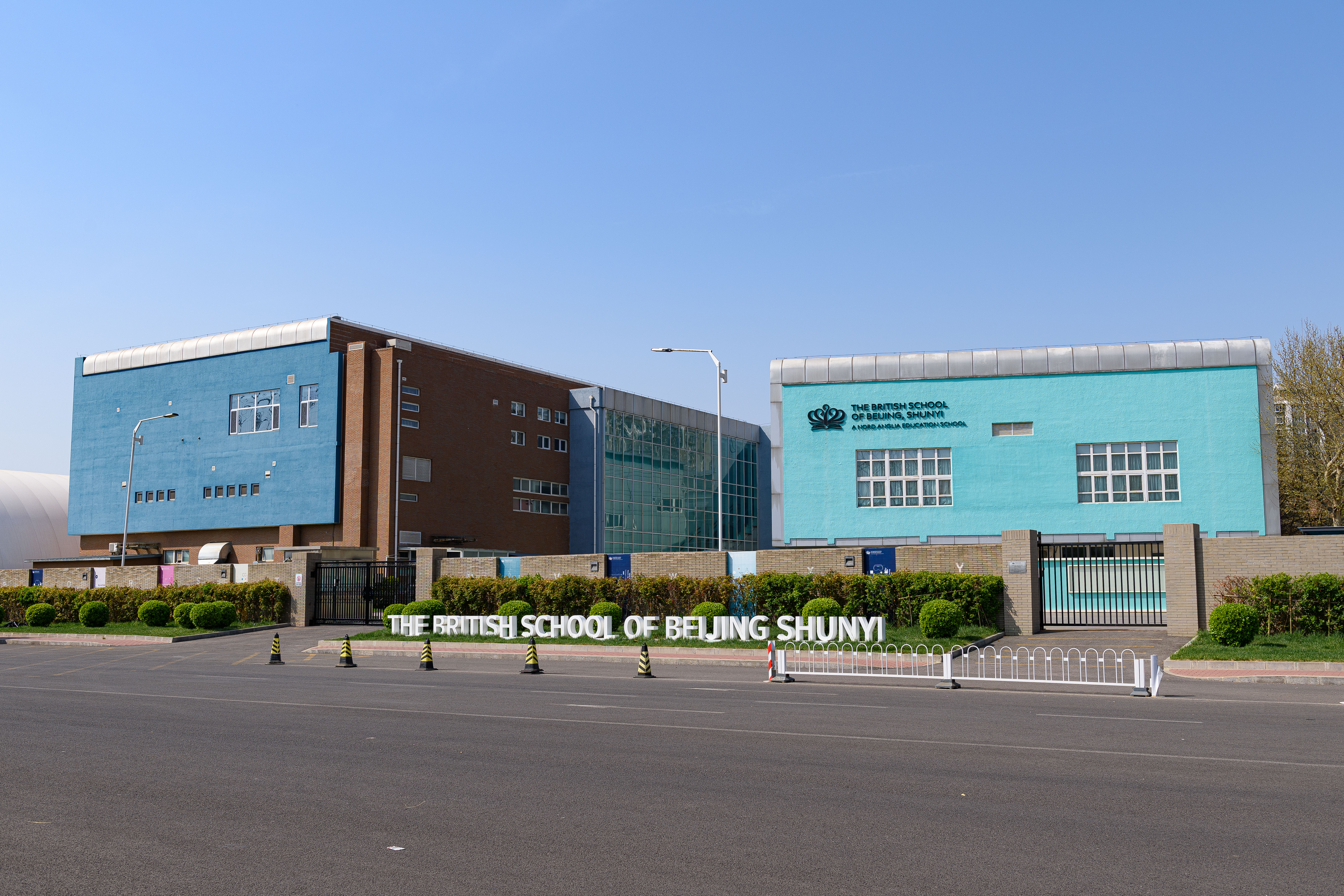
BSB Shunyi

The school offers a German Primary Programme for German-speaking primary school students in Klasse 1 to 4 to study core subjects in German, following the Thuringia Curriculum, whilst integrating into the English National Curriculum with non-core subjects and a variety of whole school activities.

== Student body ==
As of 2011 the whole BSB school had 1,150 students from 50 countries. Many of the parents work for embassies or multinational corporations. The British made up the largest group of students at BSB, about 25% of the total. The mainland European nationalities together totaled 30%, and the third-largest grouping originated from North America.

As of 2016, BSB Shunyi's maximum capacity is 1,500 students and students came from over 60 nationalities, including British, German, American, South Korean and Hong Kong.

== See also ==
- Education in Beijing
- Britons in China
