= Anti-Japanese sentiment in China =

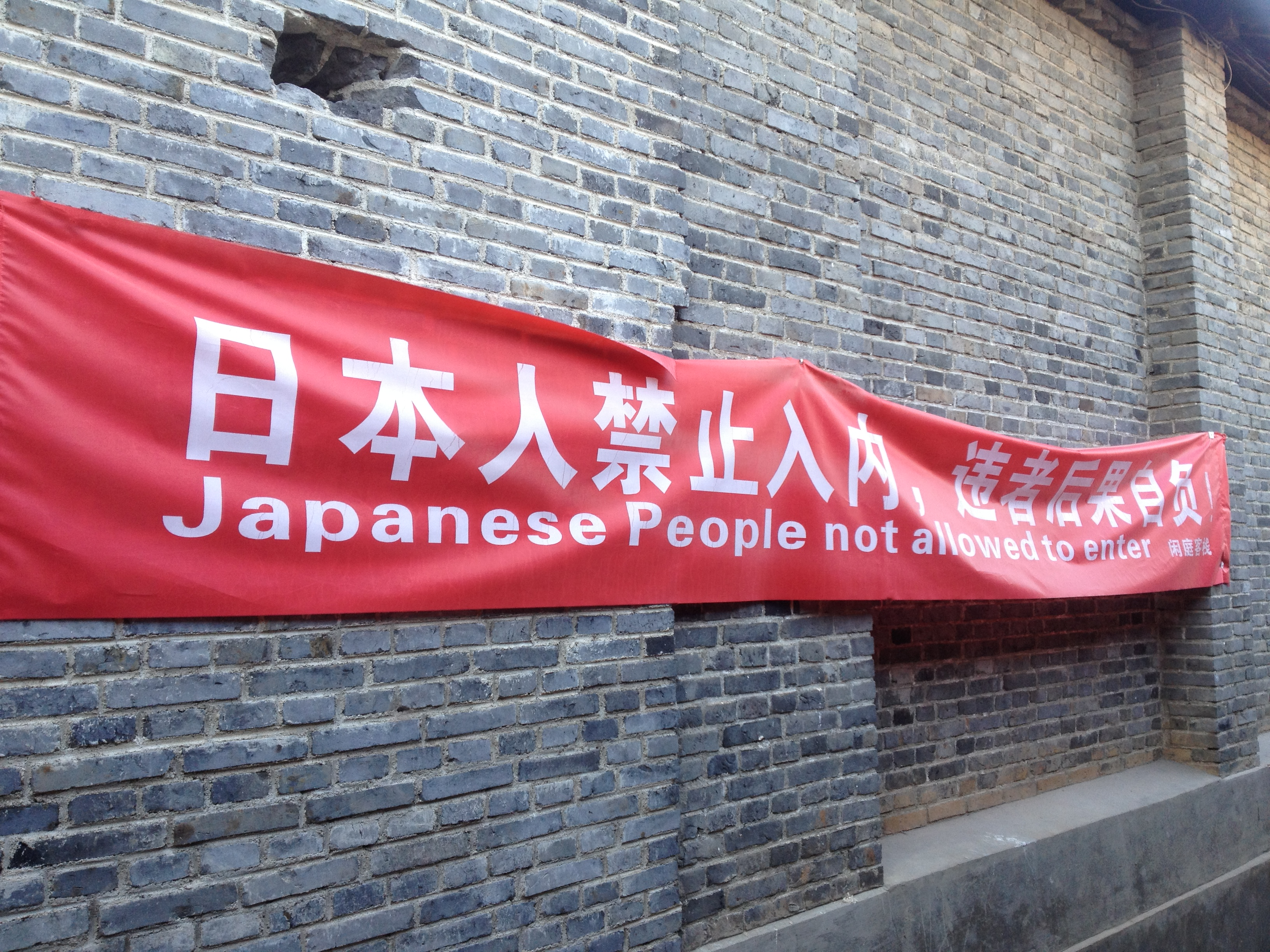
Anti-Japanese banner in Lijiang, Yunnan, 2013. The text reads: "Japanese People not allowed to enter"

Modern anti-Japanese sentiment in China is frequently rooted in nationalist or historical conflicts, for example, it is rooted in the atrocities and the war crimes which Imperial Japan committed in China during the First Sino-Japanese War, the Boxer Rebellion (Eight-Nation Alliance), the Siege of Tsingtao, the Second Sino-Japanese War and Japan's history textbook controversies. Bitterness persists in China as a result of the Second Sino-Japanese War and Japan's post-war actions. At least to some extent, this sentiment may also be influenced by issues which affect Chinese people in Japan.

According to a 2017 BBC World Service poll, mainland Chinese people hold the largest anti-Japanese sentiment in the world, with 75% of Chinese people viewing Japan's influence negatively, and 22% expressing a positive view. Anti-Japanese sentiment in China was at its highest in 2014 since the poll was first conducted in 2006 and was up 16 percent over the previous year. However, anti-Japanese sentiment significantly decreased by 2018; a poll done in 2018 by Genron NPO showed that 42.2% of Chinese people looked positively to Japan, up from 31.5% in 2017. Online hate speech against the Japanese is common on Chinese social media. Attacks against Japanese people in China are frequently censored by the authorities.

== Etymology ==
Fǎnrì (Chinese: 反日; lit. 'anti-Japan') is the term used in the Sinophone world for general anti-Japanese sentiment. This is distinct from kàngrì (抗日; 'resist Japan'), which is used to refer to resisting Japanese imperialism, especially during the Second Sino-Japanese War. Kàngrì is also used in Korea in the context of the Korean independence movement.

== Earlier history ==
Throughout Chinese history, with the exception of the raids which were committed by the Wokou (Japanese pirates) during the late Ming dynasty and the Japanese invasions of Korea in which Ming China intervened on the side of Korea, there had been little serious conflicts between China and Japan.

However, due to the Meiji Restoration, Japan became a modern power and it also attempted to expand its empire in Asia, including China. In the late Qing dynasty, Japan seized concessions in parts of mainland Chinea and annexed Taiwan and Penghu from China, as well as removing the vassal states of Ryukyu Kingdom and Korea from China's sphere of influence and later annexing them. Dissatisfaction with the settlement and the Twenty-One Demands by the Imperial Japanese government led to a severe boycott of Japanese products in China in 1915.

The Tungans (Chinese Muslims, Hui people) had anti-Japanese sentiment.

== Effects of Interwar period wars and World War II ==
After the Mukden Incident in 1931, which was used as pretext for the Japanese invasion of Manchuria, Manchuria came under Japanese control. A puppet state named Manchukuo was set up with the deposed emperor Puyi as the head of state. In 1937, the Marco Polo Bridge Incident that happened in Beijing became the pretext to the start of the Second Sino-Japanese War. Most reasons for anti-Japanese sentiment in China can be directly traced to the Second Sino-Japanese War, which was also the first theatre of World War II. As a consequence of the war, China suffered 7 million to 16 million civilian deaths and 3 million military casualties.

== Postwar issues ==
There is deep resentment over the veneration of Imperial Japanese war veterans in the Yasukuni Shrine, where a number of war criminals are enshrined, treated as kami or important spirits, and the fact that the shrine openly states that the purpose of Japanese military involvement in Asia was to bring prosperity and liberation to Asians. This is further exacerbated by attempts to whitewash Japan's role in the war in certain school history textbooks, such as by softening some statements and removing others. That some popular media such as comics, books, movies, or documentaries depicting Japanese wartime involvement in atrocities are withdrawn due to nationalist or popular sentiment further contributes to this image. As examples, critics point to the withdrawal of Iris Chang's The Rape of Nanking from planned publication and the censorship of scenes of the Nanjing Massacre from the Japanese theatrical release of The Last Emperor.

China refused war reparations from Japan in the 1972 Joint Communiqué. Japan gave official development assistance (ODA), amounting to 3 trillion yen (US$30 billion). According to estimates, Japan accounts for more than 60 percent of China's ODA received. About 25 percent of the funding for all of China's infrastructure projects between 1994 and 1998 — including roads, railways, telecom systems and harbours — came from Japan.

Japanese aid to China was rarely formally publicized to the Chinese people by the Chinese government, until Japan announced that aid was to be phased out. It was finally publicly acknowledged by Chinese premier Wen Jiabao during his April 2007 trip to Japan.

The United States, Japan, and Taiwan have been attempting to contain China. Japan's more recent debate to revise Article 9, the "No War" clause, is viewed with suspicion of possible re-militarization. Anti-Japanese sentiment in China is also highlighted by the branding of several prominent Taiwanese politicians (especially those who advocate for Taiwanese independence) as "Japanese running dogs" and hanjian (traitors) by Chinese state media.

== Contemporary issues ==
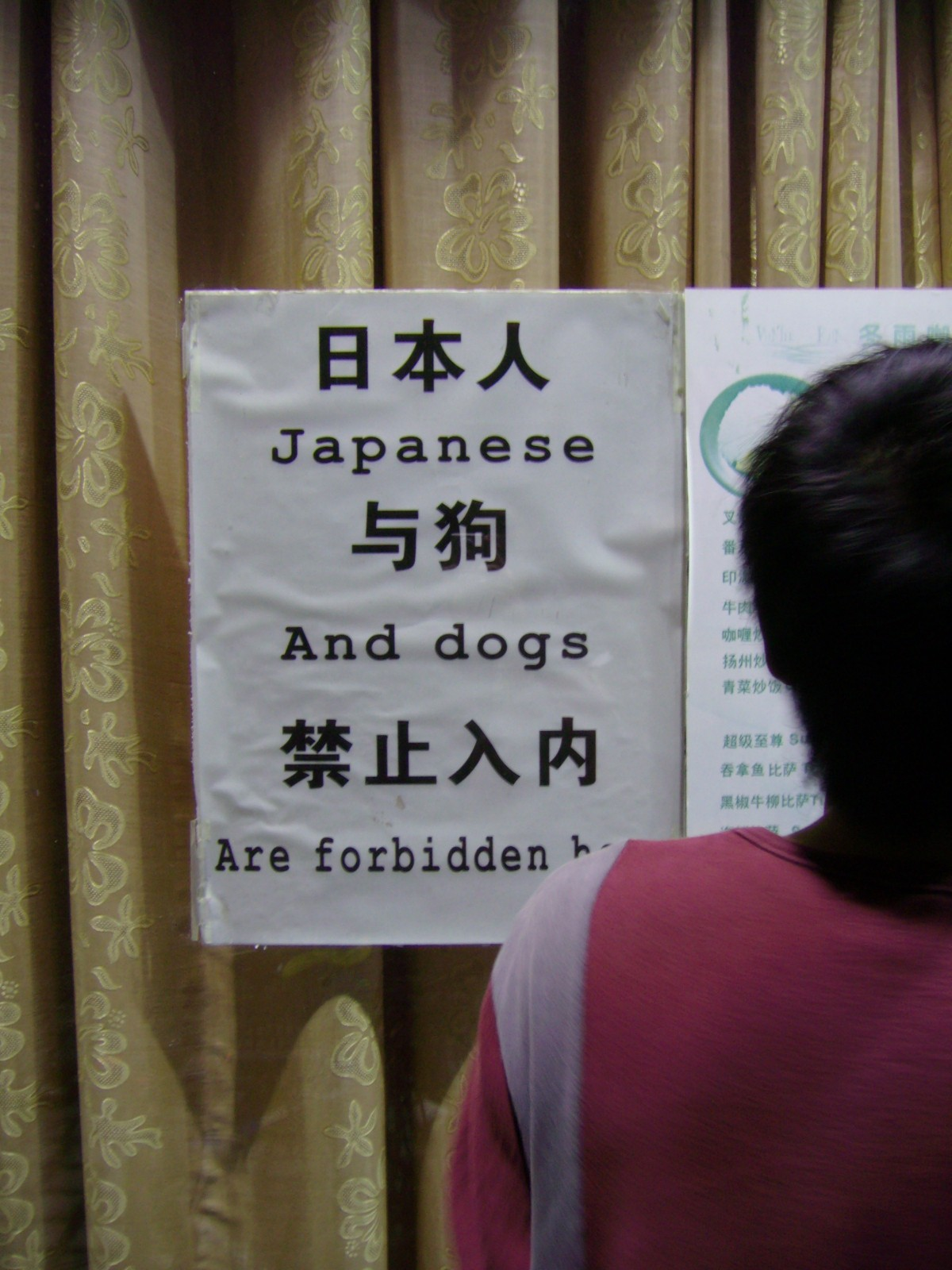
A sign in a Guangzhou restaurant reads "Japanese and dogs are forbidden here." The phrase alludes to a sign in the Shanghai International Settlement abbreviated in popular memory as "Chinese and dogs are forbidden here." The sign in Huangpu Park actually listed 10 regulations in English, the first being: "The Gardens are reserved for the Foreign Community", and the fourth being "Dogs and bicycles are not admitted".

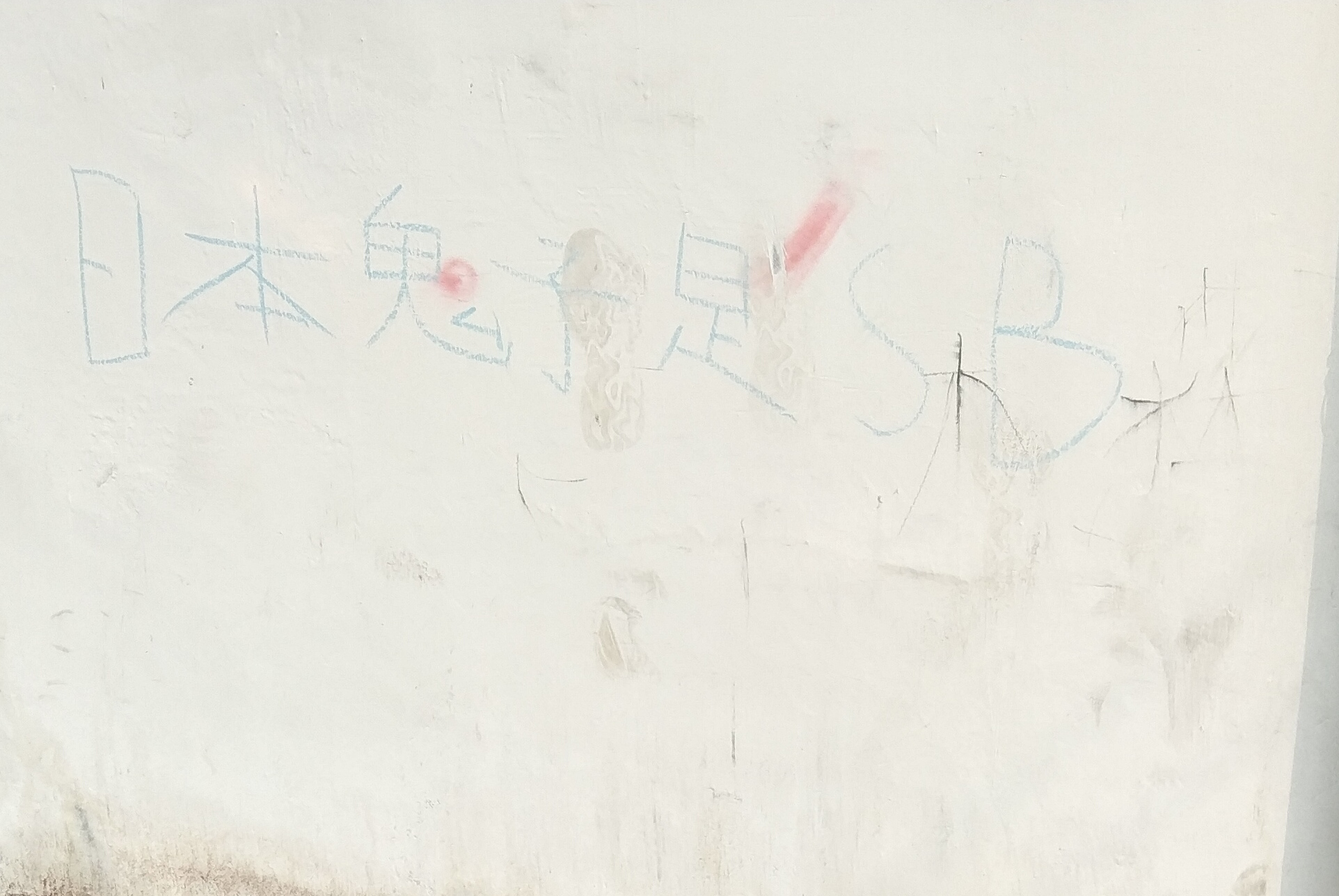
Anti-Japanese slogans written on the wall of a house in Luoyang

Issues from the Second World War continue to generate ill-feeling in China. One issue is Japanese disposal of chemical weapons left in China by Japanese troops at the end of the war. The Chemical Weapons Convention (CWC), which came into effect in April 1997, and the Memorandum on the Destruction of Japanese Discarded Chemical Weapons in China, signed on 30 July 1999, required Japan to dispose of an estimated 700,000 abandoned chemical weapons (Japanese estimate). Japan was unable to complete the work on time and requested a five-year extension.

Chinese plaintiffs suing the Japanese government over accidents caused by the unearthing of poison gas have had difficulty gaining satisfaction from Japanese courts. Forty-three people who were injured in a 2003 accident and five relatives of one who died have been unsuccessful in their claim for 1.43 billion yen (US$11.8 million; €9.1 million), as well as for medical costs and loss of income due to health problems.

On March 13, 2007, the Tokyo High Court upheld a lower court ruling and rejected compensation claims from four Chinese people who were injured and one whose relative died from being exposed to chemical weapons abandoned by Imperial Japan in China at the end of the war. Presiding Judge Hiromitsu Okita said the Japanese government was not liable for death or injury from the weapons, saying it could not have conducted a proper search for weapons in another country. The plaintiffs had sought a combined 80 million yen from the Japanese government. The court said the state was not obligated to conduct a search or to pay damages "because it cannot be said that the defendants could have prevented the outcome" of the death and injuries in the case, according to Japan Times. There were at least 700,000 pieces of chemical weapons Japan buried in China with site information destroyed by Japanese military according to the Japanese Ministry of Foreign Affairs. Such lawsuits have been filed before, but Japanese courts have rejected most claims filed by individual WWII war crime victims.

In March 2007, Japanese Prime Minister Shinzo Abe sparked a row over "comfort women". A group of about 120 lawmakers from Abe's governing party wanted the prime minister to revise the official apology. The lawmakers claimed there was no evidence to suggest the Imperial Japanese Army was directly involved in coercing the women. They said they would present the government with a petition next week demanding a rewrite of the apology, which they considered a stain on Japan's national honor. Abe told reporters in his Tokyo office that he shared the belief that there was no direct proof of the military's involvement, stating: "The fact is, there is no evidence to prove there was coercion," he said according to LA Times. Abe said the government would cooperate with a study to be conducted by a group of Liberal Democratic party MPs who are skeptical of claims that thousands of Asian women were forced to work in Japanese military brothels before and during the Second World War according to Guardian. After the condemnation around the world, Abe made a qualified apology, saying "I express my sympathy for the hardships they suffered and offer my apology for the situation they found themselves in." Abe told the legislature when pressed on what he would say to the aging survivors of the "comfort women" system: "As the prime minister, I am apologizing here" according to the Los Angeles Times.

There have been several reports that stores, restaurants, public institutions and hospitals in China refuse to serve Japanese customers because Japan has not apologized for the invasion of China. Online vitriol has been aimed at Japanese-language schools in China. In July 2024, a knife attack on a Japanese woman and her child at the Japanese School of Suzhou led some Chinese social media users to write in support of the attacker, although the posts were condemned and quickly removed. A Chinese woman who had intervened to stop the attacker later died from her wounds. In September 2024, on the anniversary of the Mukden incident, a 10-year-old Japanese student was stabbed to death en route to a Japanese primary school in Shenzhen. Online discussion of the killing was widely censored. While some condoned or were supportive of the killing, most comments online mourned the incident. In July 2025, an attack on a Japanese woman and her child in Suzhou on the 80th anniversary of the end of the Second Sino-Japanese War was also censored.

=== Anti-Japanese sentiment at sporting events ===
==== 2004 AFC Asian Cup ====
During the 2004 Asian Cup held in China, Chinese fans booed the Japanese team during the playing of the Japanese national anthem at matches against several countries, including China. Except for the match against Bahrain, Japanese supporters were instructed by the local police not to use "banners, flags, musical instruments or wear team uniforms" and were asked to refrain from cheering. The flight to Beijing, the venue of the final match against China, was delayed for two hours due to Chinese protesters at Beijing International Airport. After Japan defeated China 3–1 in the final, Chinese fans were enraged and the Japanese ambassador's car was severely damaged.

==== 2007 FIFA Women's World Cup ====
At the last game of Group A of 2007 FIFA Women's World Cup held in Hangzhou, tens of thousands of Chinese spectators in attendance cheered for the German team and booed the Japanese team vehemently. Japan was defeated by Germany and knocked out of the tournament prematurely. The Japanese players later held up a banner to thank China ("Arigato 謝謝 (Xie Xie) China") at the end of the game while the audience applauded in response. The incident caused minor controversy in China over the Chinese nationalism and anti-Japanese sentiment displayed at the game.

The game was originally planned to be held on September 18, the anniversary of the Mukden Incident. Because of the sensitive nature of the date in China, it was held one day earlier.

==== 2008 EAFF Cup ====
During the 2008 WAFF Cup, Chinese fans booed the Japanese anthem again in Japan's first match against North Korea in Chongqing on February 17. The attitude of Chinese fans had not improved despite police warnings before the game. After the match between the Japanese team and the Chinese national team on February 20, a small group of Chinese fans burnt the Japanese national flag and booed the Japanese team with the derogatory term, xiǎo Rìběn (小日本, "puny Japanese").

==== Lionel Messi Inter Miami controversy ====
Following the signing of Argentine footballer Lionel Messi, Major League Soccer side Inter Miami embarked on a global preseason tour in 2024, which included matches in Hong Kong against the Hong Kong League XI and Tokyo against Vissel Kobe. During the February 4 match in Hong Kong, Messi was not active due to an injury, which caused fans to demand refunds of 4,880 HKD (US$624) while also booing him and attacking promotional posters featuring him. Messi was later active in the match against Vissel Kobe on February 7, which caused people to believe that Messi was faking his injury to embarrass Hong Kong. Some fans in both Hong Kong and mainland China went as far as to accuse Messi of holding racist views against Chinese people in favor of Japanese people.

=== Senkaku Islands dispute ===
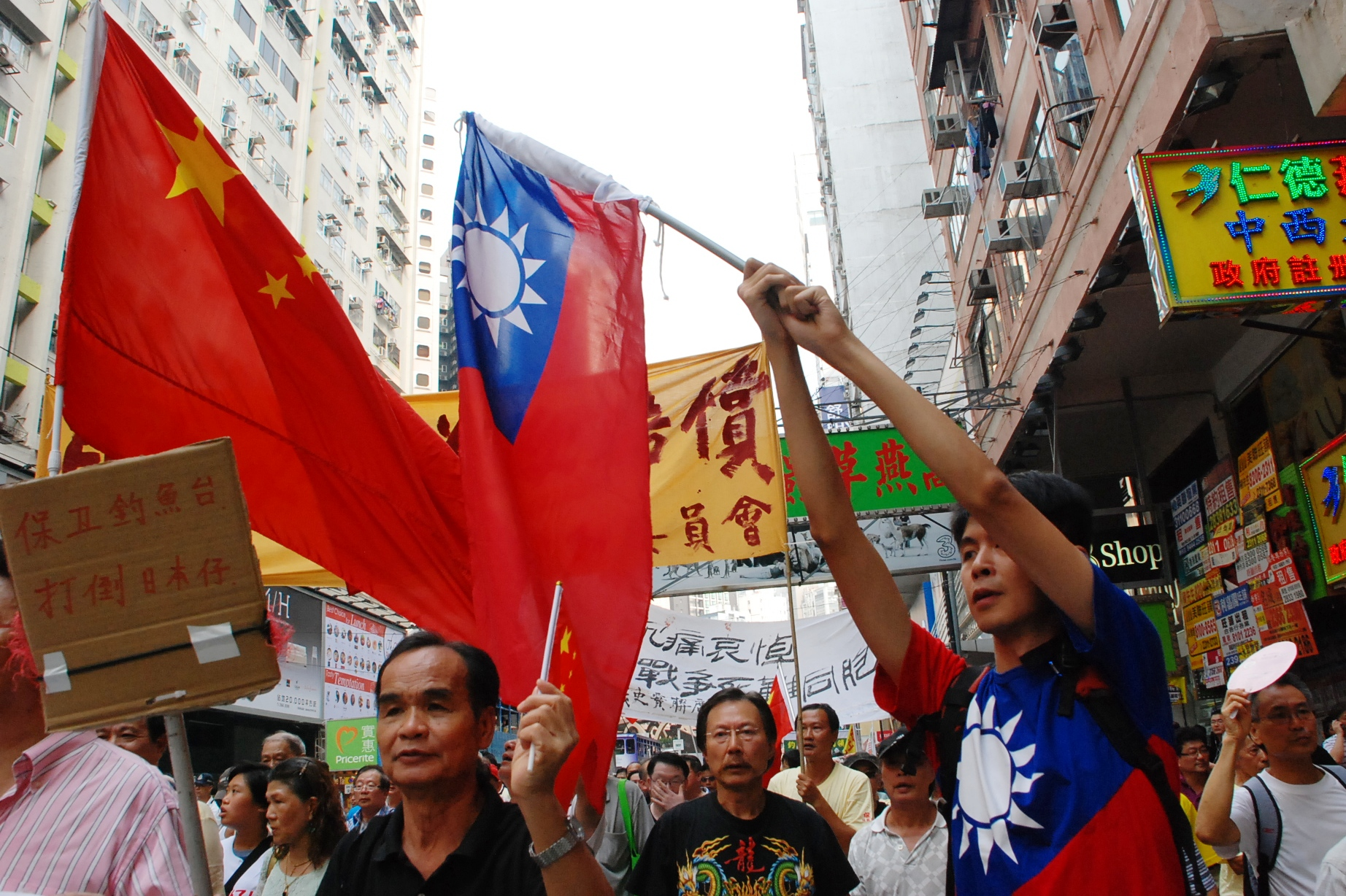
Anti-Japan protest in Hong Kong in 2012

In 2006, the Chinese government censored what it viewed as excessive anti-Japanese sentiment online related to the Senkaku Islands dispute.

In 2012, the Japanese government decided to purchase the Senkaku Islands from a Japanese family. Riots broke out in most Chinese major cities, and Japanese-owned business were smashed. In Shenzhen, the rioting crowd tried to take over a government building, demanding the Chinese government to declare war with Japan. There were multiple reports where people who were using Japanese products were attacked in the public. There was a report that a man in Hainan Province was stabbed to death for saying that Japan may win if a war between China and Japan broke out.

A 2023 study found that the boycotts of Japanese goods had a persistent adverse impact on Japanese automobile sales in China.

=== Anti-Japanese film industry ===
Anti-Japanese sentiment can be seen in anti-Japanese war films produced and displayed in mainland China. More than 200 anti-Japanese films are made in China each year. In one situation involving a more moderate anti-Japanese war film, the government of China temporarily banned 2000's Devils on the Doorstep, partly because it depicted a Japanese soldier being friendly with Chinese villagers.

=== Anti-Natsumatsuri ===
Natsumatsuri (夏祭り, lit. Summer Festival) events in mainland China were cancelled after protests broke out since 16 July 2022. Some people, reasoning that because natsumatsuri originates in Japan, claim that it should not be a festival celebrated in China. A scandal in the Xuanzang Temple in which some Imperial Japanese Army generals who were convicted war criminals were memorialized contributed to anti-Japanese sentiment.

== See also ==
- Anti-Chinese sentiment in Japan
- Anti-Japanese sentiment in Korea
- Anti-Japanese sentiment in the United States
- Anti-Japaneseism
- History of China–Japan relations
- Jingri
- Racism in China
