= 2024 Shanghai supermarket stabbing =

2024 mass stabbing in China

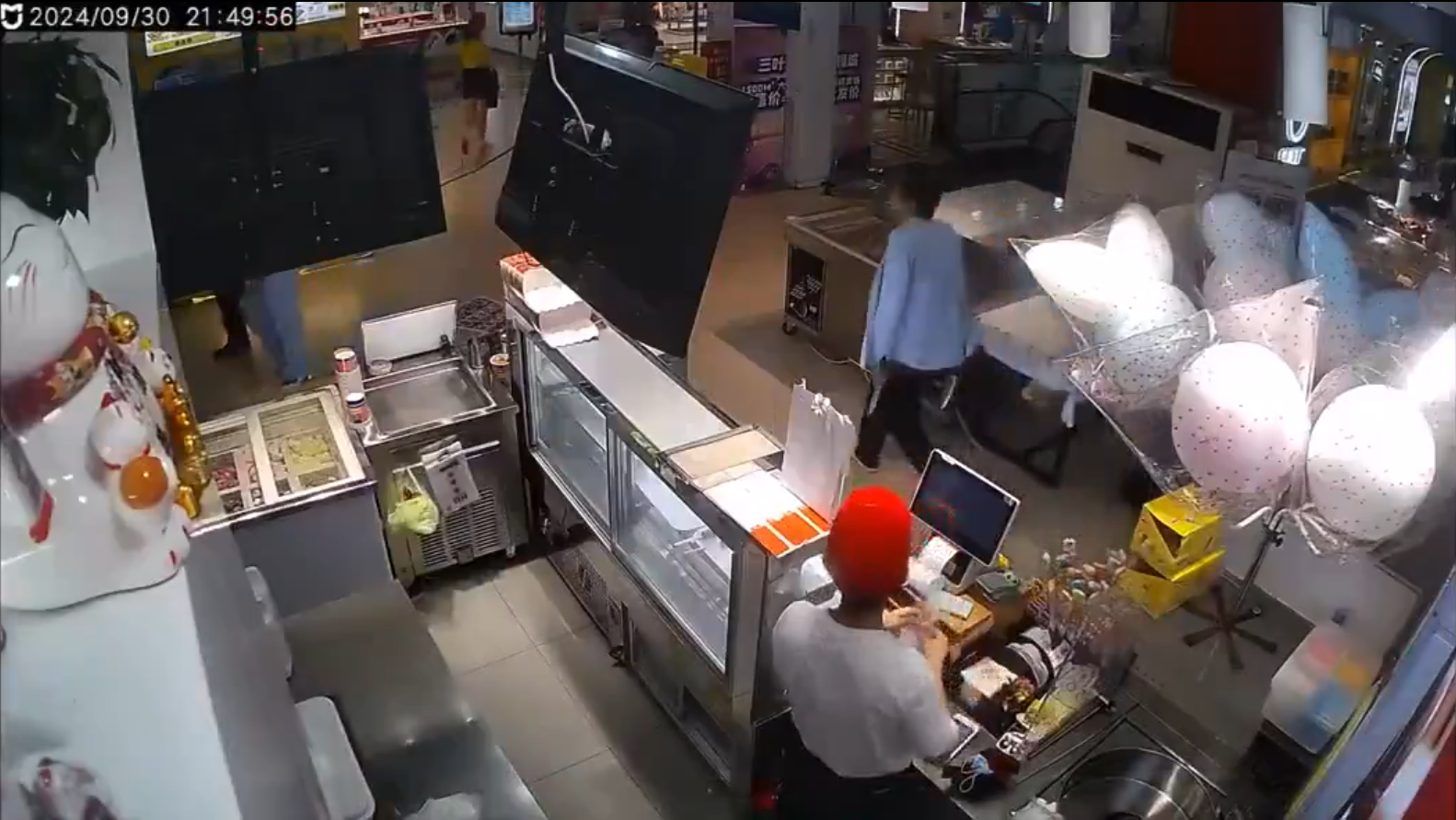
- The perpetrator roaming the supermarket with knives during the attack
- Location: 31.0045°N 121.2346°E; Songjiang, Shanghai, China
- Date: 30 September 2024; 21:46 (CST)
- Attack type: Mass stabbing
- Weapon: Knives
- Deaths: 3
- Injuries: 15
- Motive: Under investigation, possibly to vent anger over personal financial issues
- Accused: Lin Weihu

On 30 September 2024, a mass stabbing incident occurred at a Walmart supermarket in Songjiang, Shanghai, China, resulting in the deaths of three people and 15 others injured. A 37-year-old male suspect was arrested at the scene.

== Incident ==
On 30 September 2024, the eve of China's National Day, a mass stabbing incident occurred at a Walmart supermarket in the Songjiang District of Shanghai. At 21:46, a man armed with two knives entered the supermarket and quickly stabbed people before being subdued. A total of 18 victims including a two-year-old were rushed to the hospital, although three of them died due to knife injuries while the other 15, who all sustained non-life-threatening injuries, were undergoing treatment.

According to local police, the suspect, a 37-year-old man identified as Lin Weihu, was detained by the authorities at the scene. The suspect had allegedly harboured feelings of anger that arose from a "personal economic dispute", which prompted the suspect to commit the crime.

== See also ==
- 2024 Shenzhen stabbing
- 2024 Suzhou knife attack
