= Xuanzang Temple =

Xuanzang Temple, may refer to:

- Xuanzang Temple (Nanjing), Buddhist temple in Xuanwu District, Nanjing, Jiangsu, China
- Xuanzang Temple (Taiwan), Buddhist temple in Nantou County, Taiwan
