= Jilin Beishan Stadium =

Sports venue in Jilin, China

Jilin Beishan Stadium (Chinese: 吉林市北山体育场), formerly known as Jilin People's Stadium (Chinese: 吉林市人民体育场), was a multi-purpose stadium in Beishan Park, Jilin City, China. The stadium was managed by the Jilin Municipal Sports Commission (Chinese: 吉林市体委) and used mostly for football matches.

== History ==
Jilin Beishan Stadium was constructed in 1949 at the foot of Beishan Park, Jilin City in China. A football competition took place in Jilin Beishan Stadium during the 1st Jilin Provincial Games (Chinese: 吉林省运动会), which happened between 25 and 29 September 1949. On 1 October 1949, Jilin Province residents assembled at the stadium to listen to the proclamation of the People's Republic of China by Mao Zedong, the Chairman of the Chinese Communist Party. Government and military leaders assembled for the event. Attendees included Liu Xiwu, the Communist Party Committee Secretary of Jilin Province, and Li Dezhong, the Communist Party Committee Deputy Secretary of Jilin Province. Liu gave a speech, and they had a parade.

Jilan Province's second sports review general assembly (Chinese: 体育检阅大会) took place at Jilin Beishan Stadium in a year in the 1950s. Held from 14 to 20 September, the event had almost 500 athletes compete. Students made up 50.4% of the attendees and came from Jilin Normal University, Jilin City No.1 High School, and Jilin Martial Arts Museum (Chinese: 吉林国术馆). The events were track and field, basketball, volleyball, football, tennis, and softball. The competitions had different divisions: junior high school, high school, and adults. During the showcase, Jilin primary and secondary school students gave demonstrations of dances, gymnastics, and martial arts.

== See also ==
- Sports in China

== Bibliography ==
- 吉林省志 [Jilin Province Chronicles] (in Chinese). Jilin: Jilin People's Publishing House. 1991 – via Google Books.
- 吉林省教育大事記, Volume 2 [Major Events in Education in Jilin Province, Volume 2] (in Chinese). Jilin: Jilin Education Publishing House. 1989. OCLC 22789580 – via Google Books.
