= Shenzhen Japanese School =

International school in Shenzhen, China

- 深圳日本人学校

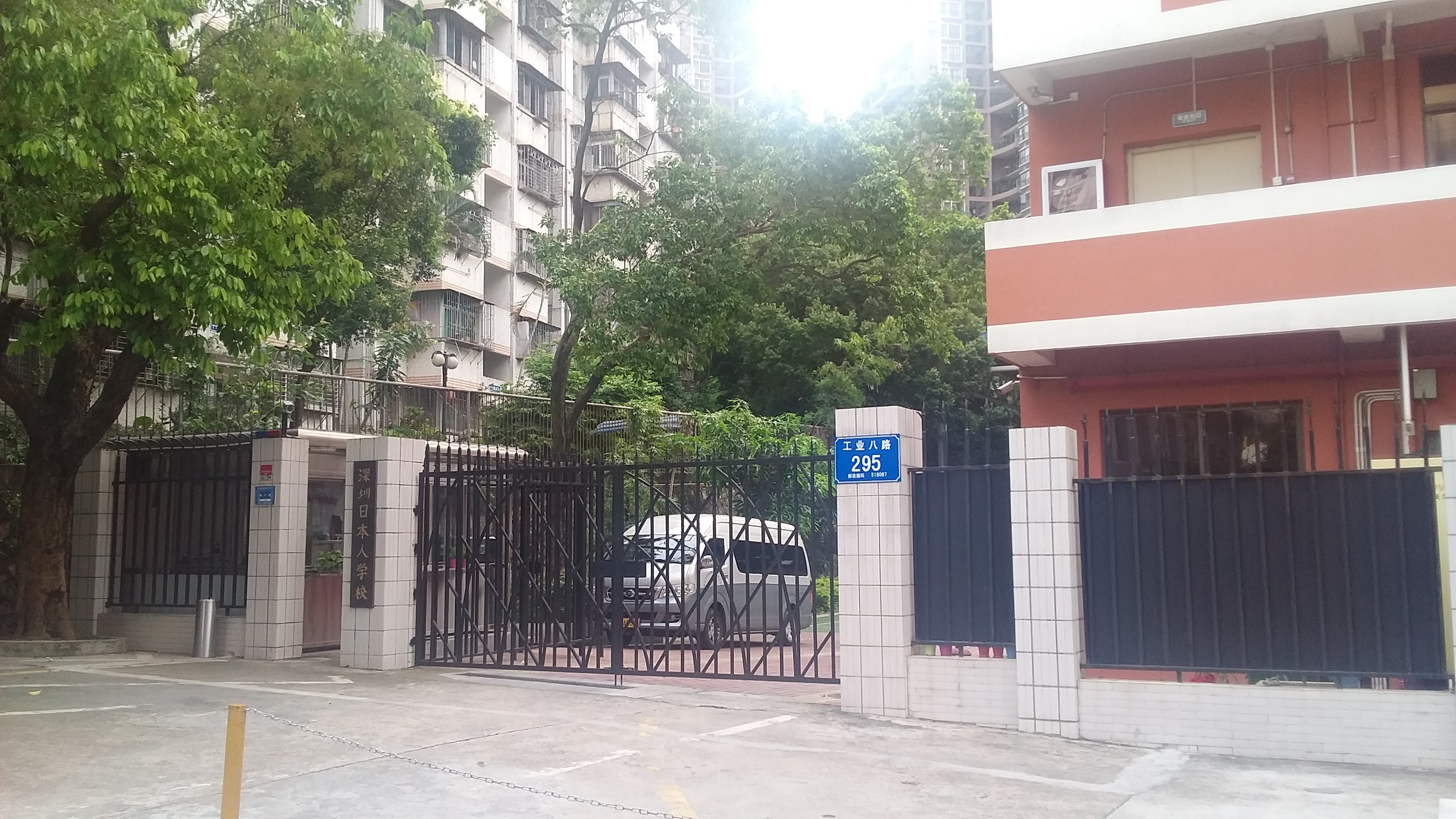

Location
- 295 Gongye 8th Road, Nanshan Dist., Shenzhen, Guangdong; Japanese: 広東省深圳市南山区工業八路295号; Chinese: 广东省深圳市南山区工业八路295号; 22.501345°N 113.917554°E

Information
- Website: jsszcn.com

Shenzhen Japanese School

Chinese name
- Simplified Chinese: 深圳日本人学校
- Traditional Chinese: 深圳日本人學校
Transcriptions
Standard Mandarin
- Hanyu Pinyin: Shēnzhèn Rìběnrén Xuéxiào
Yue: Cantonese
- Jyutping: sam1 zan3 jat6 bun2 jan4 hok6 haau6

Alternative Chinese name
- Simplified Chinese: 深圳市日本人外籍人员子女学校
- Traditional Chinese: 深圳市日本人外籍人員子女學校
Transcriptions
Standard Mandarin
- Hanyu Pinyin: Shēnzhèn Shì Rìběnrén Wàijí Rényuán Zǐnǚ Xuéxiào
Yue: Cantonese
- Jyutping: sam1 zan3 si5 jat6 bun2 jan4 ngoi6 zik6 jan4 jyun4 zi2 neoi5 hok6 haau6

Japanese name
- Kanji: 深圳日本人学校
Transcriptions
- Romanization: Shinsen Nihonjin Gakkō

The Shenzhen Japanese School is a Japanese international school in the Xin Chen Mansion, (Note: 新晨大厦; 新晨大廈; Xīnchén Dàshà; san1 san4 daai6 haa6) Shekou Industrial Zone, Nanshan District, Shenzhen. As of 2018, it is one of the eight international schools for foreigners in Shenzhen.

As of April 2024, the enrollment count was 273. The school only enrolls Japanese citizens.

== History ==
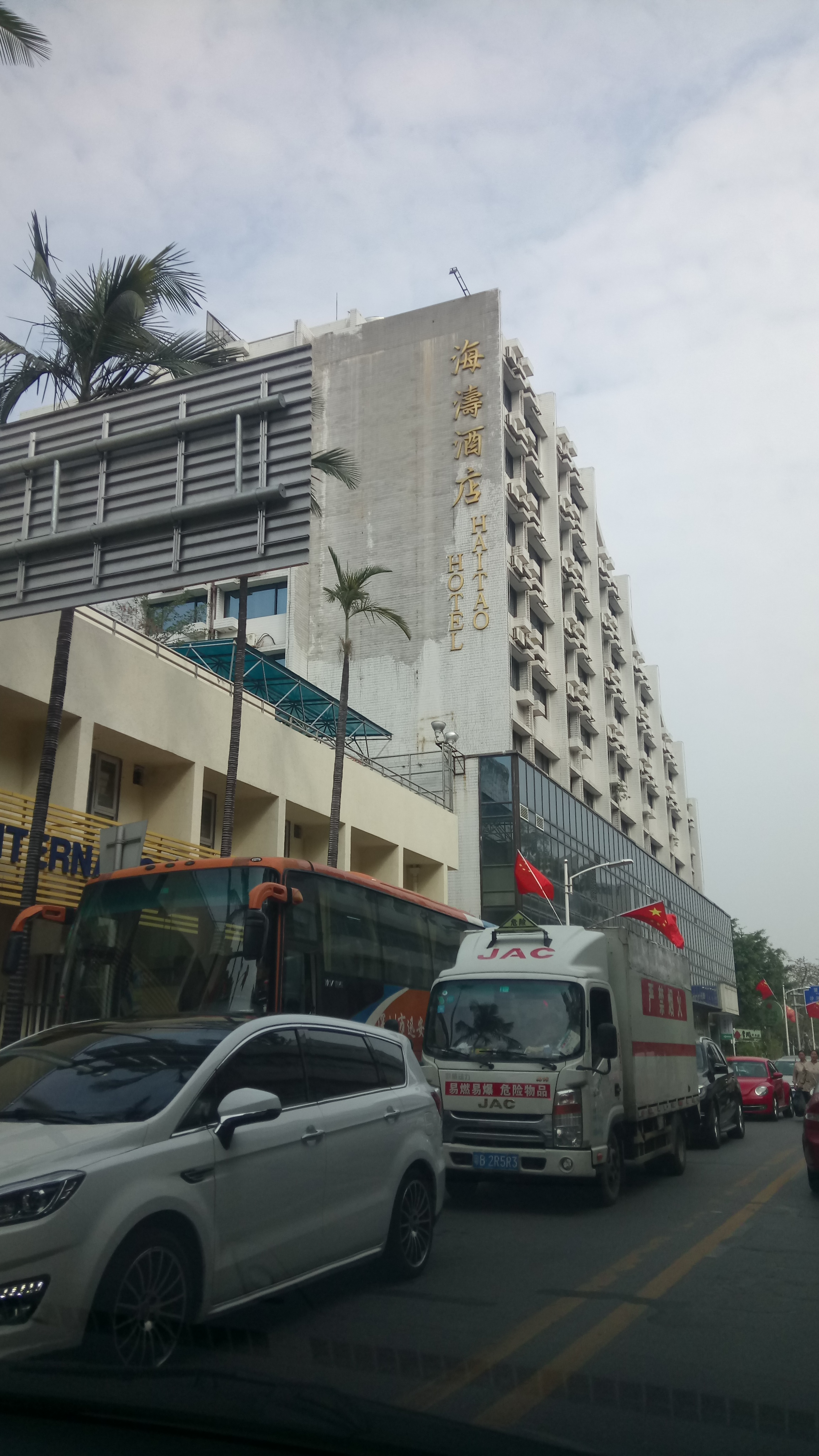
Haitao Hotel, the original location of the school

The Shenzhen Japanese Chamber of Commerce proposed establishing a Japanese school in 2004. On April 23, 2008, the Ministry of Education of PR China approved the establishment. The school opened on Friday June 13, 2008, and initially had 39 students and 17 teachers. It was temporarily housed on the second floor of the Haitao Hotel (Note: 海涛酒店; 海濤酒店; Hǎitāo Jiǔdiàn; hoi2 tou4 zau2 dim3) in Shekou, and was moved to the current location three years later. The school was sponsored by Fuji Xerox Shenzhen and several other Japanese companies.

A ten-year-old Japanese student was fatally stabbed outside the school in 2024. A suspect was apprehended immediately.

== See also ==
- Japanese people in China

Mainland China-aligned Chinese international schools in Japan:

- Kobe Chinese School
- Yokohama Yamate Chinese School
