= 2024 Suzhou knife attack =

2024 knife attack in Suzhou, Jiangsu, China

- Location: Huqiu District, Suzhou, Jiangsu, China
- Date: 24 June 2024; 16:00 (UTC+08:00)
- Attack type: Mass stabbing
- Deaths: 1
- Injuries: 2
- Perpetrator: Zhou Jiasheng

On 24 June 2024, a Chinese man attacked a Japanese mother and her three-year-old son with a knife at the Xindi Center bus station near the Japanese School of Suzhou in Suzhou, Jiangsu, China. The assailant attempted to board a Japanese school bus during the attack, fatally stabbing the bus attendant, a Chinese woman named Hu Youping (Chinese: 胡友平)—who had intervened to protect the passengers. The mother and child sustained minor injuries. The perpetrator, named Zhou Jiasheng (周加胜), was arrested and sentenced to death.

On 28 June, Mao Ning, the chief spokesperson for China's Ministry of Foreign Affairs, made a public statement mourning Hu's death, and announced that she would be formally recognized by the Suzhou municipal government for her bravery. The Chinese technology companies Tencent and NetEase announced measures to counteract extreme Chinese nationalism among netizens, which was the subject of scrutiny both prior to and after the attack.

== Background ==
Due to Suzhou's attraction to Japanese corporate investment, many Japanese companies in China have set up their headquarters in Suzhou, drawing many Japanese expatriates to the city; according to figures released by the Japanese Ministry of Foreign Affairs in October 2023, around 5,300 Japanese expatriates were living in Suzhou. According to information on the official website of the Japanese School of Suzhou, near where the attack took place, the school provides Japanese language education from the first year of elementary school to the third year of junior high school (ages c. 6–15, equivalent to American grades one through nine), and also has a kindergarten. The area around the bus stop where the stabbing occurred is where Japanese expatriates live.

This attack is the second violent attack on foreigners in China in June 2024. On 10 June four university teachers from the United States were attacked with a knife in Beishan Park, Jilin City.

== Attack ==
The Consulate General of Japan in Shanghai and the Suzhou Police reported that at about 16:00 on 24 June 2024, a mother and son of Japanese expatriates living in China and a Chinese employee on board a Japanese school bus were attacked with a knife.

According to Japanese media reports, the stabbing occurred when school was ending. The Japanese mother and her 3-year-old son were waiting for the school bus at the Xindi Center bus stop 1 km (0.62 mi) away from the Japanese School of Suzhou. When the school bus arrived at the stop, a 52-year-old Chinese man, who was unemployed and had recently arrived in the city, suddenly attacked the mother and child with a knife. The attacker grabbed the Japanese child's clothes and stabbed him in the back.

The attacker then attempted to board the school bus, but Hu Youping (胡友平), a 54-year-old Chinese school bus driver, stopped the attacker, allowing the Japanese boy to escape. According to the child's mother, Hu first pulled and then hugged the attacker. She and the student's parents used umbrellas and handbags to block the attacker. The attacker was eventually subdued by Hu and another taxi driver. Hu was stabbed several times by the criminal suspect and fell to the ground unconscious due to serious injuries. The attacker continued to make noise for a while after being subdued, and was later criminally detained by the police.

After the stabbing, the three injured were sent to the hospital, including the Japanese child. His mother was discharged from the hospital on the same day. Hu was sent to the hospital where resuscitation failed and died two days later on 26 June. On 28 June, Hu's funeral was held at the Suzhou Funeral Home. The service was attended by family members, relatives and friends, along with citizens, and leaders at the urban and municipal levels. On 2 July, Hu was posthumously awarded the title of "Model of Bravery for Righteousness" by the Suzhou authorities.

== Victim ==
Hu Youping was born on 27 July 1969, in Jialing Village, Jialing Township, Huai'an City in northern Suzhou. At the age of 20, she worked as a textile worker in a Suzhou cotton mill, before marrying and having children in Jiangsu. Hu later went to another factory to continue working. In the spring of 2016, Hu lost her job and applied for a job as a nanny and worker at a domestic service company on Ganjiang Road, Suzhou. In 2020, Hu started her own micro-business named "DM Fashion", which sold women's consumer goods. However, the store was closed due to the COVID-19 pandemic. As a result, she returned to cleaning, doing various temporary outsourcing jobs, until she applied for a job as a school bus driver and guide at the Japanese School of Suzhou.

== Aftermath ==
=== Following the attack ===
At noon on 25 June, Consul General Shuichi Akamatsu of the Japanese Consulate General in Shanghai met with Suzhou Mayor Wu Qingwen to lodge representations on the stabbing, requesting Suzhou City to disclose relevant information about the case to Japan as soon as possible and to strengthen security around Japanese schools in Suzhou. Wu said that he has requested further strengthening of safety precautions.

On the afternoon of 25 June, Mao Ning, spokesman for the Ministry of Foreign Affairs of the People's Republic of China, called the attack an "accidental incident" at a regular press conference, describing it as something that would happen all over the world. Mao said that "China is still one of the safest countries in the world", will take measures to protect foreigners in China as well as Chinese citizens. When a reporter from Bloomberg asked how her statement about China being "one of the safest countries" was measured, Mao said that it was based on "evaluations from all sides", adding, "If you live in China, I believe you can feel that China is very safe."

The Japanese Consulate General in Shanghai stated there were no clear indications that the attack intentionally targeted Japanese people. However, it stated that in April of the same year, a Japanese man was stabbed in the neck by a man who may have been Chinese on Huaihai Street in Suzhou, sustaining minor injuries.

The Japanese School of Suzhou suspended classes on 25 June before resuming them the next day after security measures were strengthened. The Suzhou police also reinforced their police presence near the school. Japanese residents of Suzhou reportedly did not let their children go out.

Chinese netizens had mixed reactions to the stabbing. One netizen posted a post praising Hu, saying, "In the long run, this heroine saved the lives of many people in Suzhou and even across the country." The post was published within a day. It received more than 20,000 likes; some netizens discussed that the stabbing may be related to hate education or anti-Japanese sentiment in China. Sina Weibo announced on 26 June that it had purged 759 posts that used the stabbing to incite hatred and glorify crimes, and banned or deleted 36 illegal accounts.

On 30 June, Kyodo News quoted multiple sources on Japan-China relations as saying that the attacker had no job and no family. He had only recently come to Suzhou and felt isolated. The attack may have been a random attack rather than a targeting of Japanese nationals.

On the afternoon of 1 July, an 87-member delegation from the Japan Association for the Promotion of International Trade, headed by former Japanese House of Representatives Speaker Yōhei Kōno, held talks with Chinese Vice Premier He Lifeng at the Great Hall of the People in Beijing. During the talks, He Lifeng said that the attack "must not be allowed" to impact on Sino-Japanese relations.

=== Mourning ===
On 28 June, Mao said that Hu embodied the kindness and bravery of the Chinese people and expressed condolences for her death.

On the same day, Japan's Chief Cabinet Secretary Yoshimasa Hayashi expressed regret for the attack and hoped the victims would recover soon. He dispatched the Japanese Consulate General in Shanghai to Suzhou to provide support to local Japanese residents. The Japanese government has also requested Beijing to prevent similar incidents from happening again and share information. Japan's ambassador to China, Kenji Kanasugi, issued a video statement on the embassy's official Sina Weibo account offering his condolences to the victims. The Japanese Embassy in China also lowered its flag at half-mast in mourning. Japanese Foreign Minister Yōko Kamikawa mourned Hu at a press conference and expressed deep sorrow for her death. Kamikawa expressed her "deep gratitude and respect for Hu Youping's brave behavior".

Many gathered at the bus stop where the stabbing took place to place flowers and express their condolences. Some netizens wrote that there were over 20 plain-clothes officers at the bus stop attempting to take away flowers from passers-by. One netizen reported they had a "big fight" with a few plainclothes people over the flowers. China News Network reported that someone at the scene said that "the flowers will be collected together and sent to the funeral parlor".

On 28 June, a report in Suzhou Daily about Hu's family stated that:

The family members unanimously discussed and decided not to accept donations of money or materials. They also hope that they will no longer be disturbed. They just hope that the deceased rests in peace and that the family can return to a peaceful life as soon as possible.

— Suzhou Daily

On the evening of 28 June, the Tianjin Radio and Television Tower projected a portrait of Hu with phrases such as "A light that illuminates the hearts of the world," and "One person's good deeds can inspire thousands of people," to express condolences.

=== Impact ===
A large number of comments on the Chinese Internet that affected the stabbing were jointly dealt with by NetEase, Tencent, Douyin, Bilibili and other Chinese social platforms. These platforms considered that "these comments incited confrontation between China and Japan and stirred up extreme nationalist sentiments, and were illegal content".

=== Sentencing ===
After being found guilty by the Suzhou Intermediate People’s Court in January, Zhou Jiansheng was executed on 16 April 2025.

== See also ==
- 2024 Shenzhen stabbing
