= 2024 Shenzhen stabbing =

2024 stabbing in Shenzhen, Guangdong, China

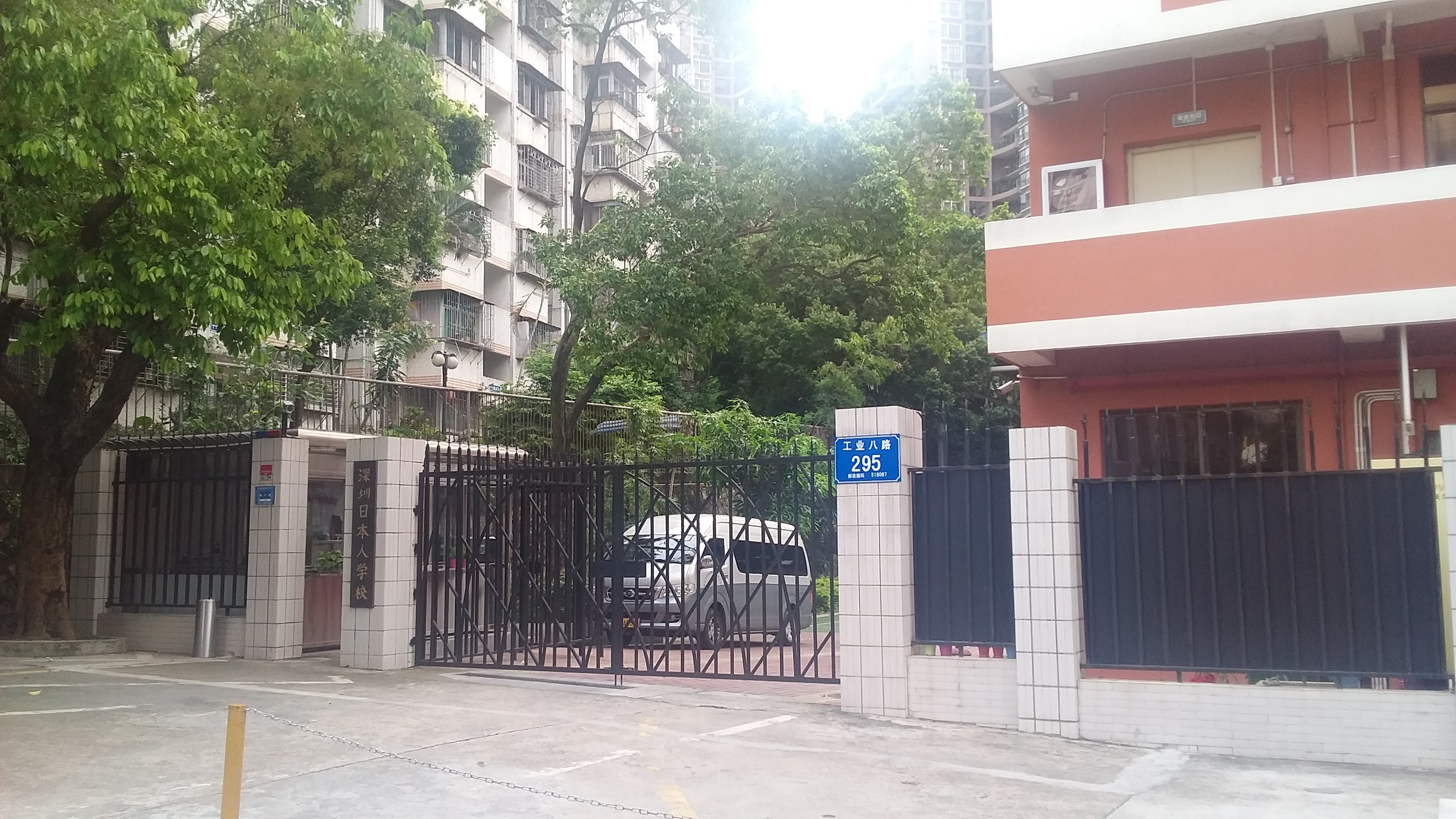
- The gates of the Shenzhen Japanese School
- Location: 22°30′18.176″N 113°54′43.452″E; Shenzhen, Guangdong, China
- Date: 18 September 2024 (UTC+08:00)
- Attack type: Stabbing attack
- Deaths: 1
- Perpetrator: Zhong Changchun
- Motive: Under investigation, possibly Chinese nationalism and anti-Japanese sentiment
- Verdict: Guilty
- Convictions: Murder; sentenced to death

On 18 September 2024, a Chinese man stabbed a ten-year-old Japanese schoolboy with a knife near the Shenzhen Japanese School in Shenzhen, Guangdong, China. The alleged attacker, a 44-year-old man surnamed Zhong, was arrested, while the boy died of injuries on the next day. Violence targeting foreigners in China had been occurring previously in 2024, prompting some observers to express concern that nationalist sentiment may have contributed to these incidents. Zhong was later sentenced to death and executed.

== Background ==
The city of Shenzhen, as a center of high technology in China, is home to many Japanese companies. In 2008, the Shenzhen Japanese School was opened for elementary and junior high school students. According to The Asahi Shimbun, Japanese parents and children often walk to school together as many of them live nearby.

Prior to the stabbing, two other attacks by locals against foreigners had happened across China in June 2024. In one incident, a man stabbed four American teachers in Jilin City. In a separate incident, another man attacked a Japanese mother and her son in Suzhou, resulting in the death of a Chinese woman who tried to stop him. After the Suzhou attack, Chinese internet companies vowed to curb extremist content on the Chinese internet.

The date of the stabbing, 18 September, is the anniversary of the Mukden incident, a 1931 false-flag operation and pretext for Japan's invasion of the Manchurian region of China.

== Attack ==
At about 8 am on 18 September 2024, a Chinese man stabbed a Japanese boy in the abdomen on his way to the Shenzhen Japanese School. The attack happened on a street 200 metres (660 ft) away from the school. According to China's foreign ministry, the boy was a Japanese national with a Japanese father and a Chinese mother. The police stated that the boy was surnamed Shen (沈). Kyodo News reported that the boy was with his mother at the time of the attack. The boy was taken to the Qianhai Shekou Free Trade Zone Hospital (深圳市前海蛇口自贸区医院) with severe injuries and died on the early morning of 19 September.

== Perpetrator ==
Following the stabbing, Shenzhen police arrested at the scene a 44-year-old male suspect, named Zhong Changchun (钟长春), from Jiangxi. According to reports, Zhong has no fixed occupation and had previously been questioned by the police in 2015 for allegedly damaging public property. He had also been detained in 2019 for disturbing public order. Officials determined that the attack was a sporadic incident and committed by a single person.

On 24 January 2025, Zhong, who had turned 45, was sentenced to death for the killing. In April 2025, the Japanese embassy in China announced that Zhong had been executed.

== Reactions ==
=== Chinese and Japanese governments ===
The day of the attack, Masataka Okano, vice foreign minister of Japan, summoned Chinese ambassador to Japan Wu Jianghao. Kenji Kanasugi, Japanese ambassador to China, called on the Chinese administration to protect Japanese residents. Lin Jian, spokesperson of China's Ministry of Foreign Affairs, pledged to continue to "take effective measures to protect the safety of all foreigners". The foreign ministry expressed sorrow and offered its condolences to the boy's family. Compared to Japanese media outlets, Chinese sources offered few details in their statements.

A day after the attack, the Japanese prime minister Fumio Kishida condemned the crime and "strongly demand[ed]" an explanation from the Chinese government. Chinese spokesperson Lin Jian said that the Chinese government would provide "necessary assistance" to the boy's family, but also called the incident "an individual case" that could happen "in any country". On 22 September, Japan's state minister for foreign affairs Yoshifumi Tsuge traveled to Beijing for three days in relation to the death.

=== Public ===
The day following the attack, Shenzhen residents placed flowers at the school and paid respects to the deceased. In Tokyo, a candlelight vigil was held by a group of Chinese people residing in Japan.

Some Chinese netizens criticized the anti-Japanese education in China, while nationalist voices alleged that the attack was staged or called for the Japanese schools to be closed. Social media companies and censors subsequently removed many posts for inciting "China-Japan antagonism". On the WeChat app, two law professors in Beijing asked people to avoid committing violent acts in the name of patriotism. It was reposted by many readers but eventually removed.

A letter supposedly written by the boy's father was published online on 24 September, before being reportedly taken down. The letter said that he does not hate China nor Japan over what happened and he wants to prevent similar tragedies in the future.

== Impact ==
The stabbing sparked worry among Japanese communities in China. In response, some Japanese schools in China have contacted parents, advising them to exercise heightened caution. Major Japanese firms operating in China also warned their workers to be vigilant.

After the attack, the Shenzhen Japanese School was closed for a week and other Japanese schools in China stepped up precautions. The Shanghai Japanese School allowed students to stay home. The Japanese School of Guangzhou and the Japanese School of Beijing stopped extracurricular activities on 18 September, and reminded students and parents to reduce unnecessary outings and not to speak Japanese loudly outside. Japanese schools in Hong Kong also increased their security measures as a precaution. The Japanese Embassy in China sent a safety notice to all Japanese in China. China also advised its nationals in Japan to take precautions.

According to the BBC, electronics giant Panasonic allowed employees and their families to temporarily return to Japan at company expense, saying they would "prioritise the safety and health of employees". Similarly, Toyota pledged to keep its Japanese expatriate staff informed and supported on the situation.

== See also ==
- 2024 Suzhou knife attack
