= Japanese School of Suzhou =

School in Suzhou, Jiangsu, China

- 蘇州日本人学校 苏州日本人学校

Location
- 79 Huaihai Street (淮海路), Suzhou New District, Suzhou, Jiangsu, China, 215011
- 31.2874964°N 120.56109960000003°E

Information
- Type: Private, international school
- Established: 2005
- Website: www.jsscn.org

Japanese School of Suzhou

Chinese name
- Simplified Chinese: 苏州日本人学校
- Traditional Chinese: 蘇州日本人學校
Transcriptions
Standard Mandarin
- Hanyu Pinyin: Sūzhōu Rìběnrén Xuéxiào

Alternative Chinese name
- Simplified Chinese: 苏州日本人外籍人员子女学校
- Traditional Chinese: 蘇州日本人外籍人員子女學校
Transcriptions
Standard Mandarin
- Hanyu Pinyin: Sūzhōu Rìběnrén Wàijí Rényuán Zǐnǚ Xuéxiào

Japanese name
- Kanji: 蘇州日本人学校
Transcriptions
- Romanization: Sūchou/Soshū Nihonjin Gakkō

The Japanese School of Suzhou (JSS) is a Japanese international school in the Suzhou New District of Suzhou, China. On February 28, 2005, the Ministry of Education of China approved the establishment of the school.

The current campus on Huahai Road (淮海路) in the Suzhou New District was scheduled to open in September 2012. The original campus, which opened in 2005, had a cost of 20 million yuan.

On the afternoon of June 24, 2024, an unemployed Chinese man attacked a Japanese mother and her preschool boy while they were waiting for their school bus in Suzhou. The bus attendant Hu Youping (JA) and others tried to stop the attacker. Hu was wounded during the confrontation and died two days later. The knife wielder has been detained by the authorities.

== See also ==
- Japanese people in China

Mainland China-aligned Chinese international schools in Japan:

- Kobe Chinese School
- Yokohama Yamate Chinese School
