= Beishan Park =

Park in Jilin City, China

Coordinates: 43°50′19.71″N 126°31′35.07″E

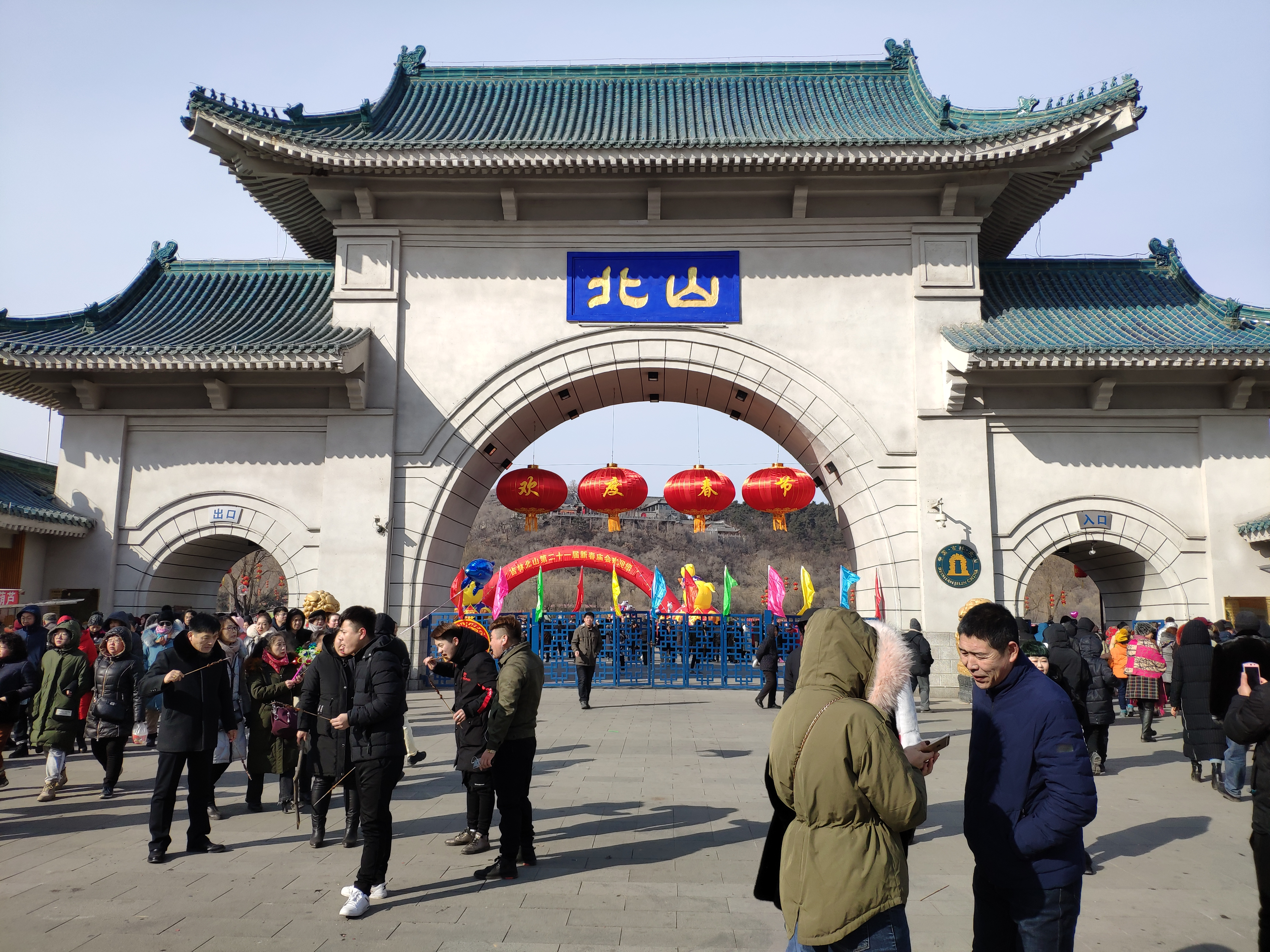
Kitayama Mountain Gate

Beishan Park, also known as Jilin Beishan Scenic Area or Jilin Beishan Park, is an urban park and scenic spot located in Chuanying District, Jilin City, Jilin Province, China. The park was founded in 1924, and is a national 4A-level tourist attraction. The park became the subject of international attention in 2024 following an attack on four university tutors from the United States of America.

== History ==
The Beishan Scenic Area is named after a nearby mountain known as Beishan, which belongs to the Xuantianling Mountain Range, with an altitude of 269.8 meters above sea level. The mountain is named Beishan because it is north of the ancient city of Jilin. Temples have been built on Beishan since the 16th century. In 1924, the area was turned into a park.

In 1948, Beishan Park covered an area of 86 hectares. The park went through a refurbishment, and it was reopened to the public in 1949. Since then, it has undergone several renovations and expansions. In 1985, it covered an area of 138 hectares and received 2.5 million visitors annually.

In early 1998, the Jilin Municipal Government approved the designation of 518 hectares of Beishan District as the "Beishan Tourism Economic Development Zone", and in 2003 the municipal government established the Beishan Scenic Area. In 2010, the east side of Beishan Mountain was rebuilt into People's Square, and Beishan Scenic Area also announced that from January 1, 2011, the admission fee will be cancelled and open to the general public free of charge.

== Landscape ==
=== Temple complexes and fairs ===
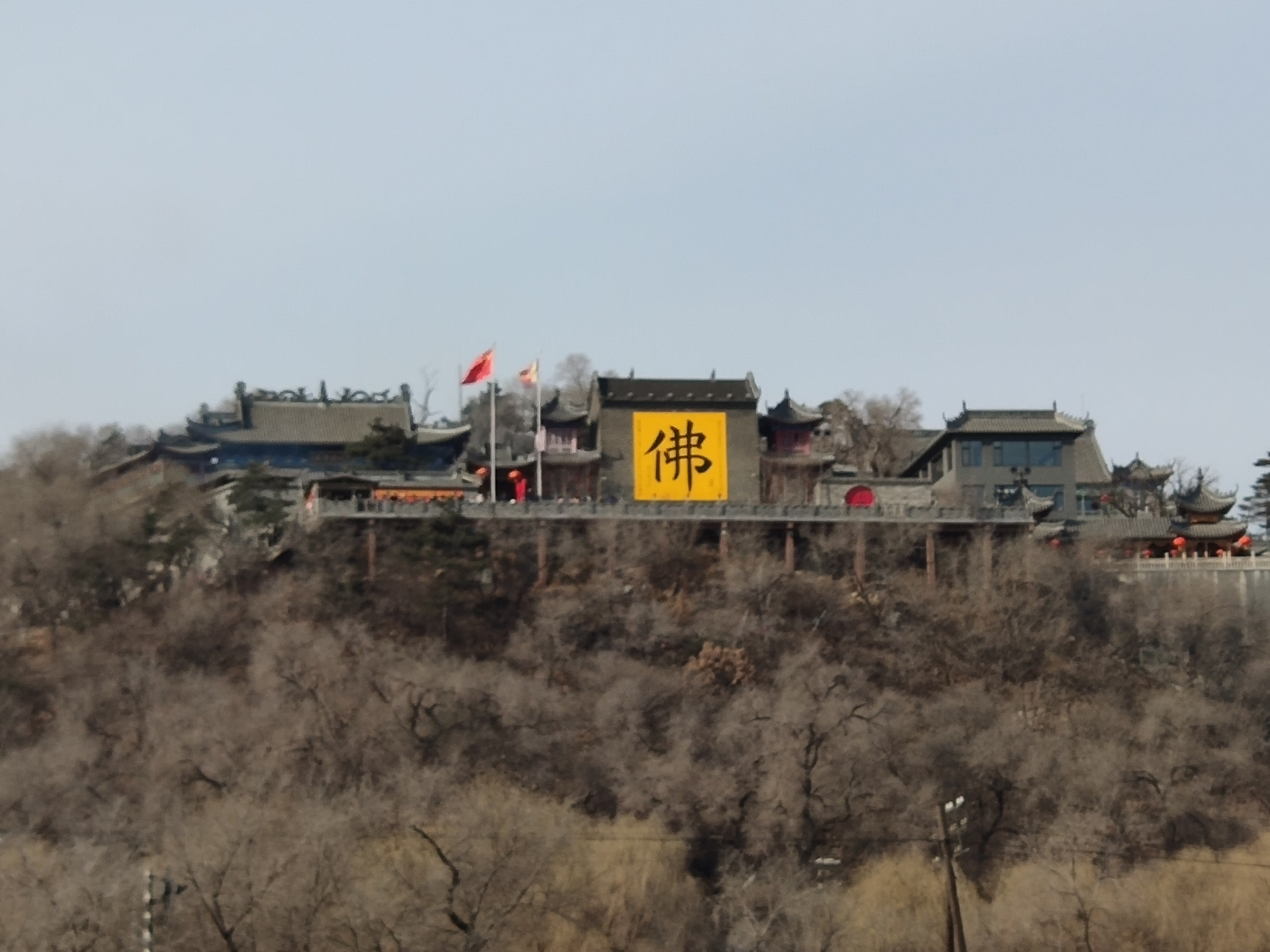
Beishan New Year temple fair.

The Beishan temple complex became a protected site for the city government on September 7, 1961, and a protected site within the Jilin Province government on October 20, 1987.

The oldest extant temple is the Guandi Temple, built in 1701. It was modified in 1731, 1869, 1924 and 1983. The main hall hangs a plaque of "Lingzhu Youqi" when Emperor Qianlong made his eastern tour in 1754. It is for the veneration of Guan Yu, Guan Ping, Zhou Cang, Guanyin and Wei Tuo among others.

Yaowang Temple was built in 1738 and modified in 1787, 1887 and 1983 for veneration of the Three Sovereigns and Five Emperors, Sun Simiao and others There is a basement at the Yaowang Temple, where Kim Il Sung held several secret meetings and engaged in revolutionary activities during his activities in Jilin.

The Jade Emperor Pavilion was built in 1776 and is the largest temple in the complex. In 1926, a large-scale reconstruction was made; It was renovated in the 1980s. The temple is for the veneration of the Jade Emperor, Emperor Xuanzong of Tang and others. There were originally two towers behind the Jade Emperor Pavilion, but they were destroyed during the Cultural Revolution.

Kanli Palace is located in front of the Jade Emperor Pavilion and was built in 1908 for the veneration of Hu Xian and others.

Zhiguang Temple was originally built east of the Jade Emperor Pavilion in 1919 as a bhikkhunī temple. Destroyed during the Cultural Revolution, it was rebuilt in 1995 in a different location.

Guangji Temple, also called Jigong Temple, was originally built in 1922 opposite the Niumaxing Hongqi Theater as a bhikshuni temple, which was originally dedicated to Jigong. It was occupied by a factory during the Cultural Revolution, recovered after the Cultural Revolution, and moved to the Beishan area in 1994 due to construction.

The temples have fairs, with Beishan temple fair in early April, Niangniang Temple Fair on April 18, and the Yaowang Temple Fair and Guandi Temple Fair on April 28. Since 1999, Beishan Park has held the Spring Festival temple fair every year.

=== Pavilions ===
There is a pavilion on the top of the west peak of Beishan, also known as the Ping'an Bell Tower, which was originally built in 1913 as a one-story wooden structure; In 1964, it was rebuilt into a two-story hexagonal pillar pavilion. There is the Lanyue Pavilion at the top of the East Peak, which was built in 1976. There are also other pavilions, including Yuejin Pavilion, Taoyuan Pavilion and Jiangshan Pavilion.

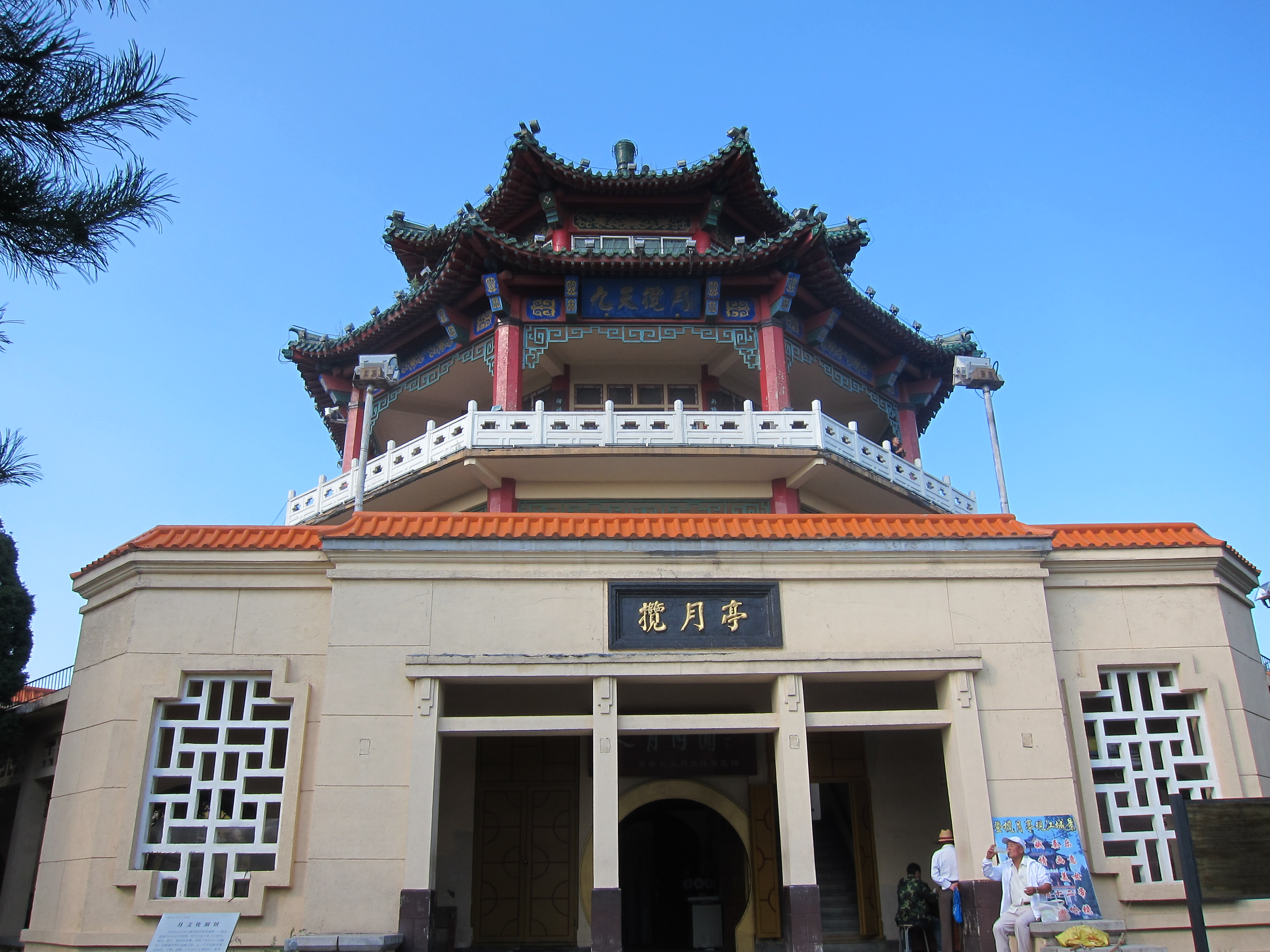
Kitayama Lanyue Pavilion

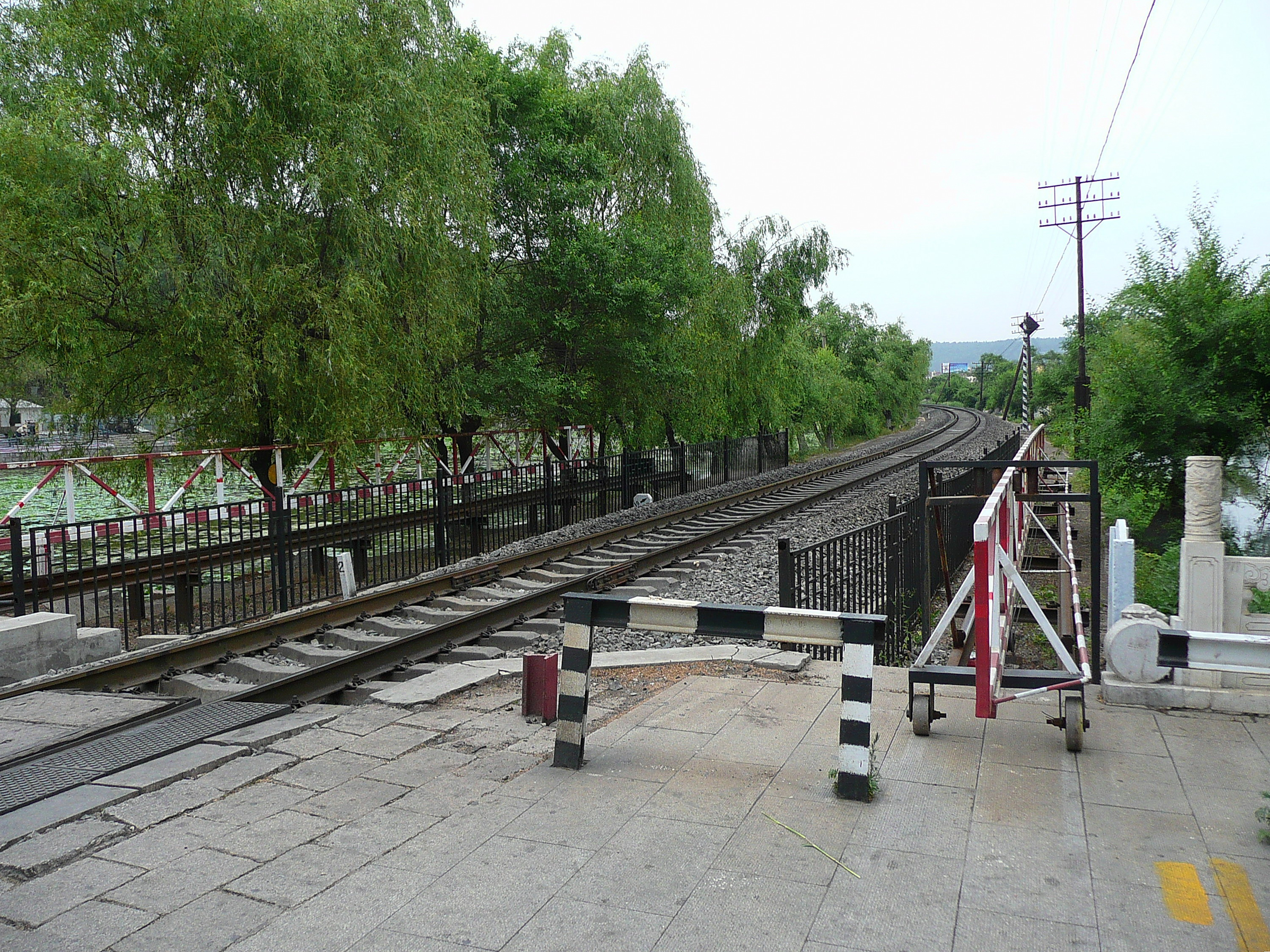
A level crossing in Beishan Park

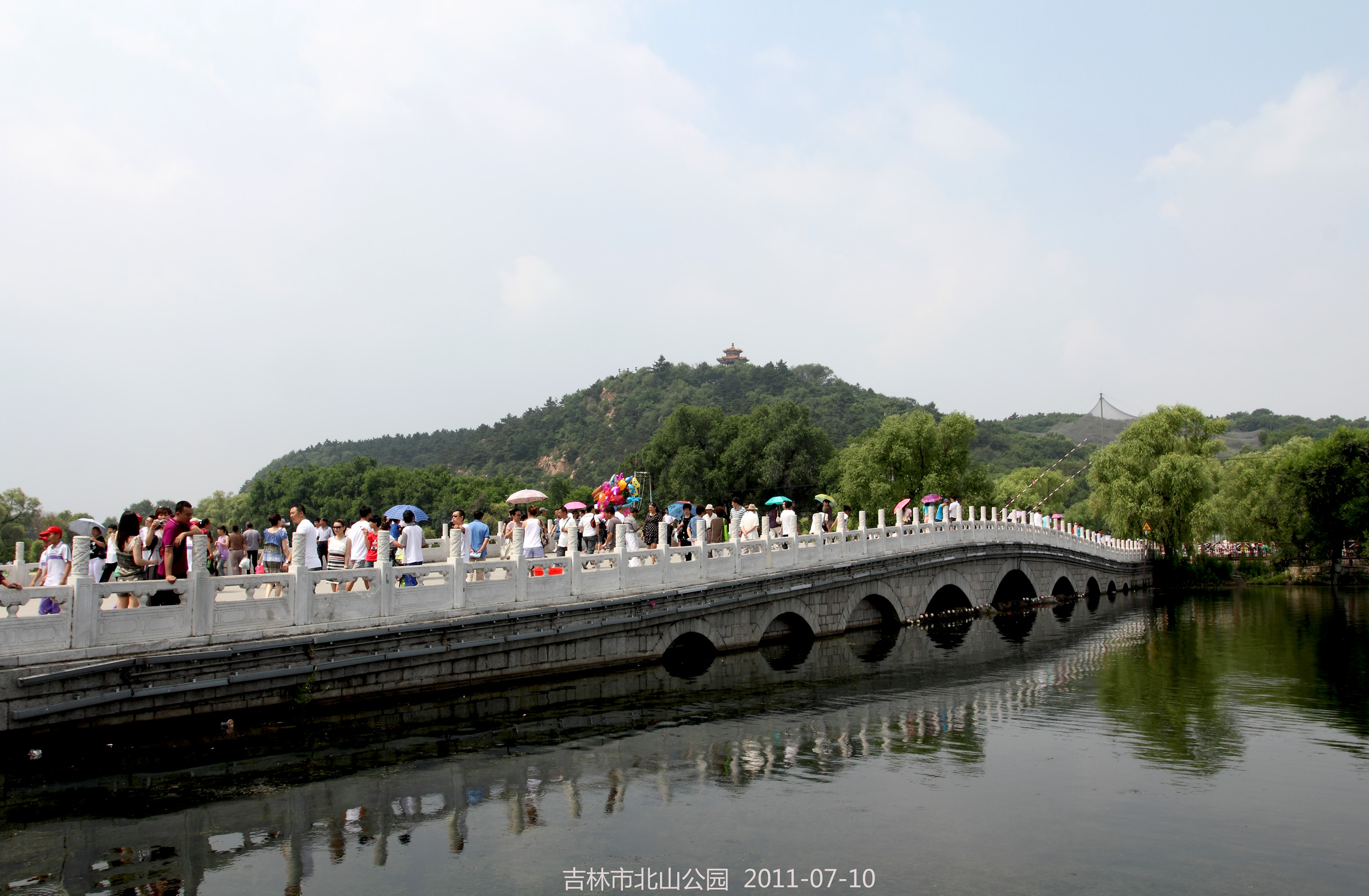
Wobo Bridge

=== Bridge ===
The current Lanlan Bridge was rebuilt in 1935 as a stone arch bridge constructed from granite, at an altitude of 265 meters above sea level, across the valley between the east and west peaks of Beishan. Legend has it that the Lanyi Bridge was named after the Manchukuo Emperor Puyi.

=== Memorial Tower ===
There is a memorial tower which acts as a Martyrs' shrine built on the hill behind Beishan, completed in 1956. the tower is 29.6 meters high and made of granite. On the east side, there is a revolutionary martyrs' cemetery, covering an area of 10,500 square meters. In September 2000, the remains of Wei Zhengmin, a mentor of Kim Il Sung, were moved from the Wei Zhengmin Tomb in Huadian, Jilin to the cemetery. There is a memorial hall built between the memorial tower and the cemetery, completed in 1993.

=== Ski resort ===
Beishan Houshan was turned into a ski resort during the Manchukuo period, becoming the first ski resort in mainland China. The resort was abandoned during the Cultural Revolution. In 1991, the ski resort reopened to the public. In 1998, the resort was rebuilt as Beishan Ice and Snow World, covering an area of 10 hectares.

=== Bomb shelter and four-season ski resort ===
During the period of the Sino-Soviet split, Jilin City built a large-scale civil air defense system including an underground bomb shelter. The project was built in 1965, and successively from 1971 to 1984 mainly used for underground garage use, with a total construction area of 27,787 square meters, costing 660 million Chinese Yuan (equivalent to CNY 4.4 billion in 2019). From 1980 to 1984, the original cave was expanded, and could accommodate 1,000 people, with a net width of 33.5 meters, a height of 16 meters, a length of 60 meters, a construction area of 5,680 square meters, and a usable area of 4,980 square meters.

On April 27, 2017, the General Administration of Sport of China, the Jilin Provincial Sports Bureau, and the Jilin Municipal Government agreed on the construction of Cross-Country Skiing Venues in preparation for the 2022 Beijing Winter Olympics. The Beishan Civil Air Defense Project was to be turned into a four-season cross-country ski resort for cross-country skiing, biathlon, Nordic combined and other Winter Olympics snow sports throughout the year. The total construction area of the project was 25,244 square meters and the total usable area was 19,425 square meters. The indoor slope is 1,308 meters and the athlete service center is about 3,000 square meters. There are 1,616 meters of outdoor ski slopes, 500 meters of public ski slopes and 1,500 square meters of four-season ice and snow experience halls. Construction started in September 2017, and the main project was completed in September 2018. In January 2019, Beishan Four Seasons Cross-Country Ski Resort began operation, becoming the fourth all-weather standardized ski professional training ground in the world and the first in Asia. From March to the end of November 2019, the resort received a total of 31 cross-country ski teams from China, South Korea, and Japan, training more than 17,000 people throughout the year, including 649 athletes stationed in long-term training.

== 2024 attack ==
In June 2024, four university tutors from Cornell College were injured in an incident in the park. The four American nationals were visiting a local temple when they were attacked by a man with a knife. Chinese police arrested a 55-year-old man following the attack. David Zabner, the brother of Adam Zabner, was one of the victims.
