= Xuanzang Temple (Nanjing) =

Buddhist temple in China

- 玄奘寺
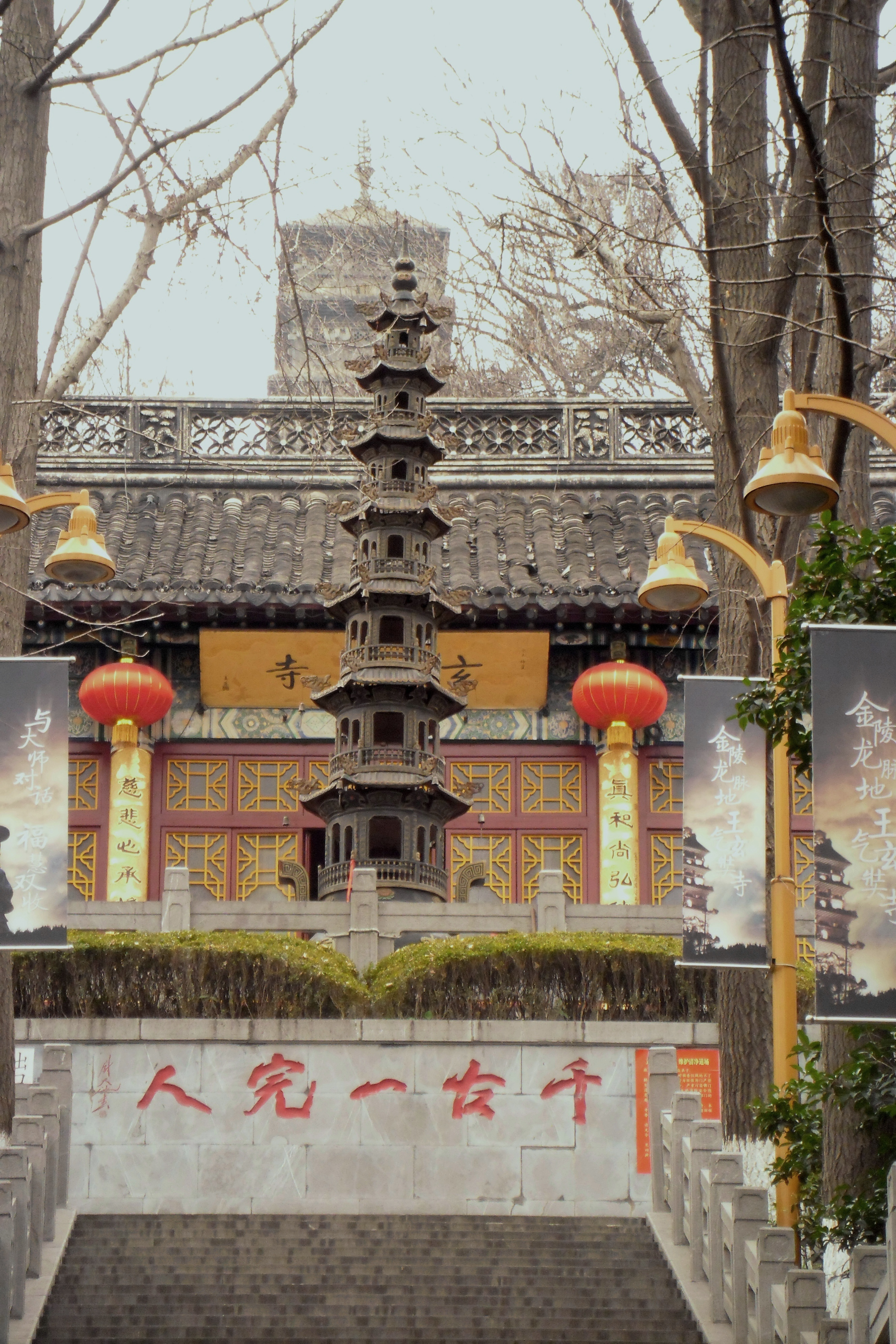
- Front view

- Location within Jiangsu

Religion
- Affiliation: Buddhism
- Sect: Chan Buddhism
- Leadership: Shi Chuanzhen

Location
- Location: Xuanwu District, Nanjing, Jiangsu, China
- Interactive map of Xuanzang Temple
- Coordinates: 32°04′03″N 118°48′45″E

Architecture
- Style: Chinese architecture
- Established: 2003
- Materials: Bricks and cement

Xuanzang Temple (Chinese: 玄奘寺; pinyin: Xuánzàng Sì) is a Buddhist temple located within Jiuhua Mountain Park, in Xuanwu District, Nanjing, Jiangsu, China.

== History ==
In the early winter of 1942, the occupying Imperial Japanese Army dug a stone envelope at the ruins of Sanzang Pagoda at Great Bao'en Temple which contained the Śarīra of the Tang dynasty (618–907) eminent monk Xuanzang. In early 1943, the Wang Jingwei government built a brick tower to worship the Śarīra of Xuanzang, which was named Sanzang Pagoda (三藏塔).

Xuanzang Temple was built by the Xuanwu District Government in 2003 in memory of eminent Buddhist monk Xuanzang of the Tang dynasty. Shi Chuanzhen, a leader of Qixia Temple, was proposed as abbot of the temple.

In 2004, Xuanzang Temple was designated as a National Patriotism Education Demonstration Base by the Nanjing Municipal People's Government.

In July 2022, memorial tablets of war criminals of the Imperial Japanese Army, including Tanaka Gunkichi, Iwane Matsui, Hisao Tani and Noda Tsuyoshi, were found in Xuanzang Temple, which caused the dismissal of the abbot Shi Chuanzhen and the punishment of local officials.

== Gallery ==
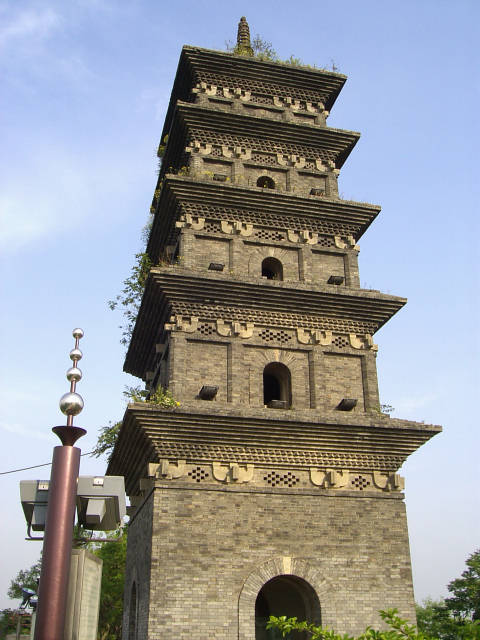
Sanzang Pagoda

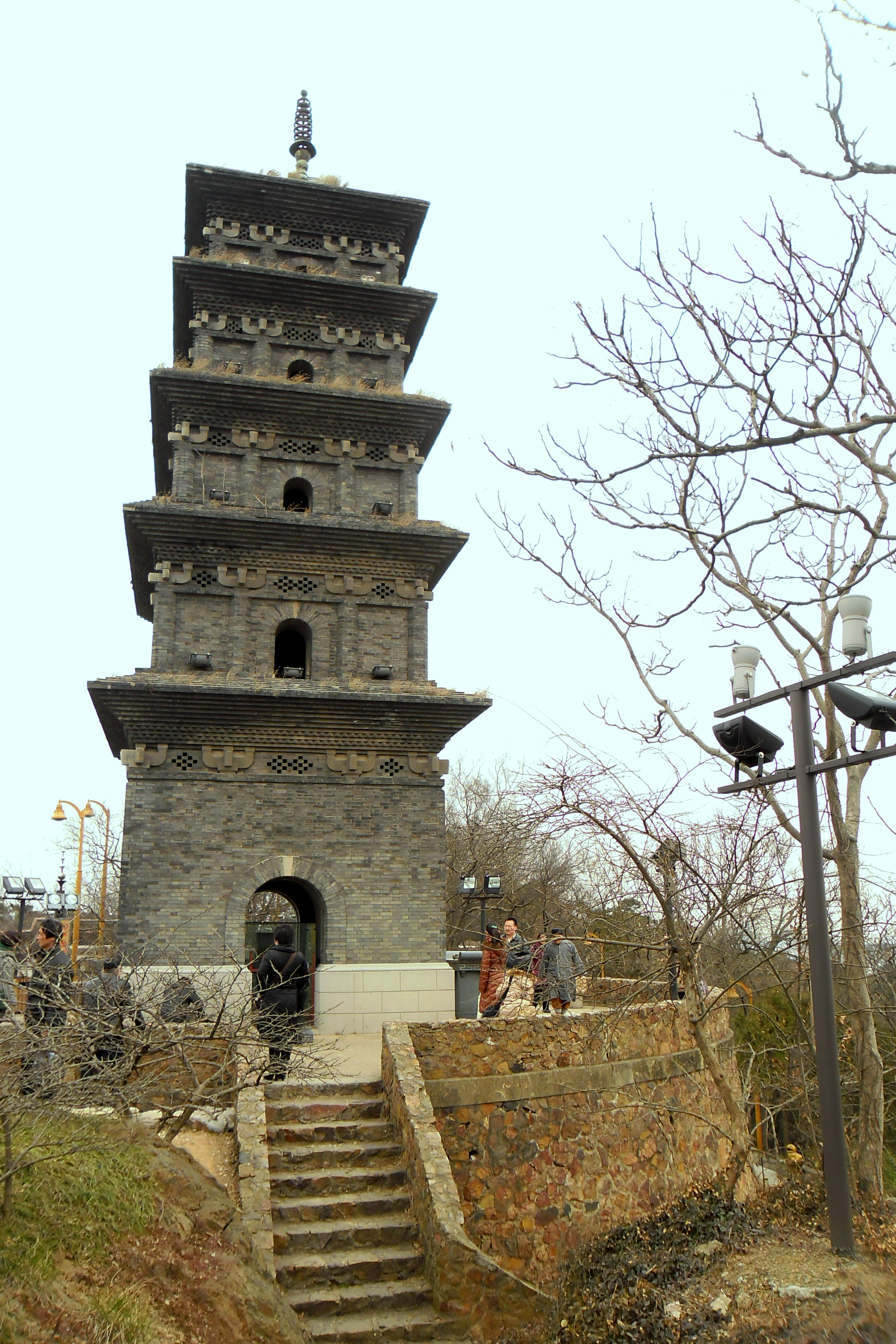
Sanzang Pagoda

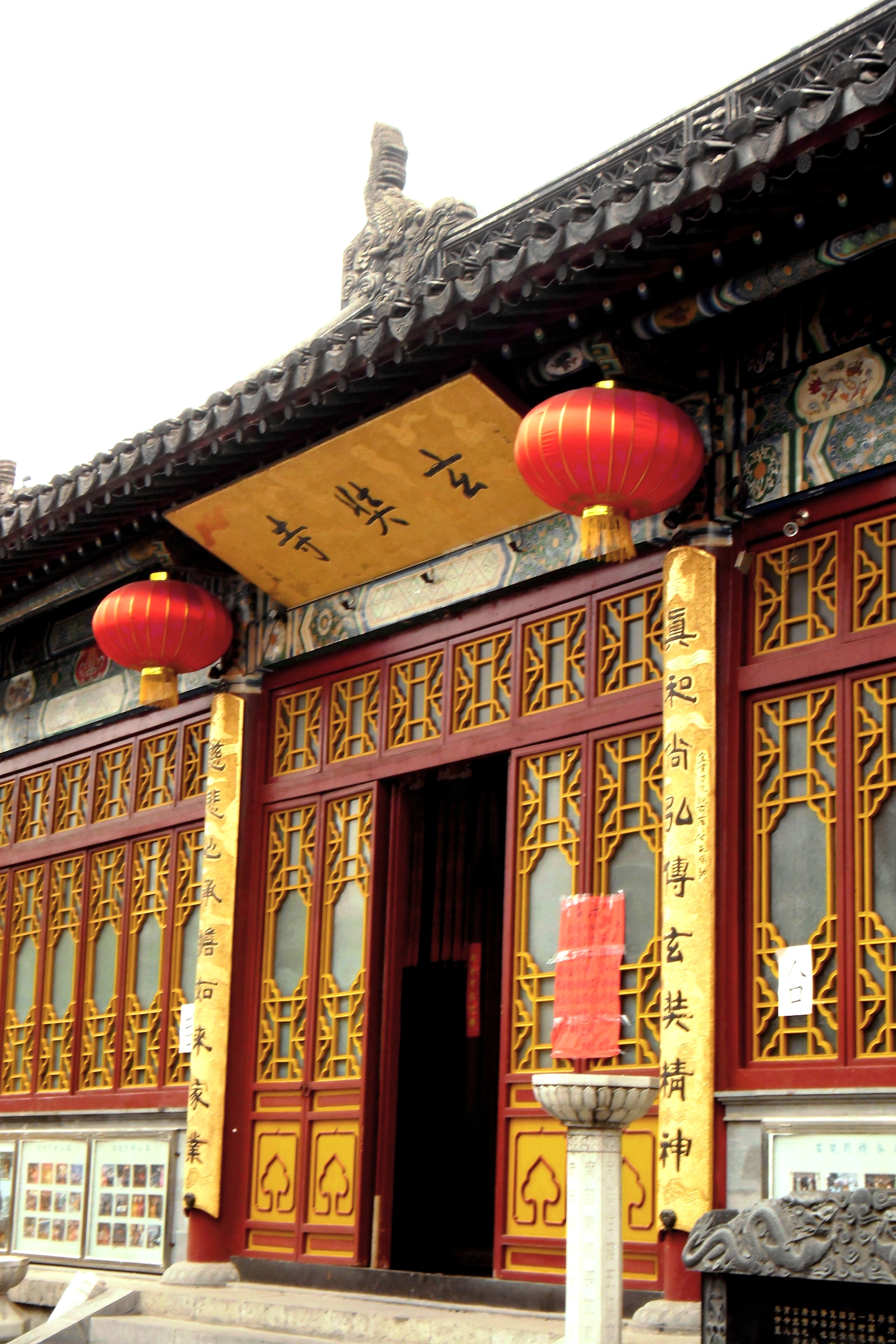
A hall of Xuanzang Temple
