= Education in Beijing =

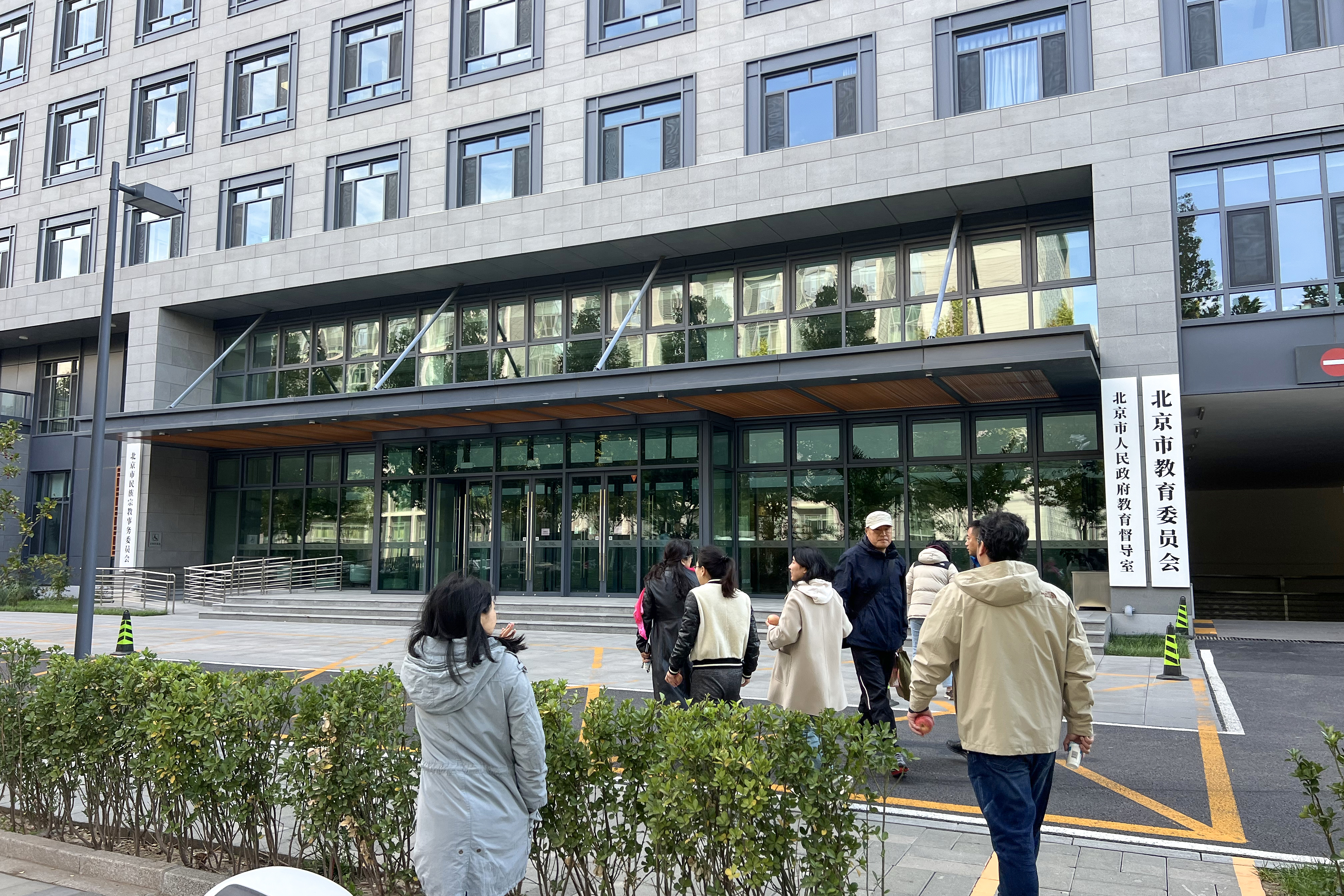
Beijing Municipal Commission of Education new office is now located at 6-2 Daji Street, Tongzhou District

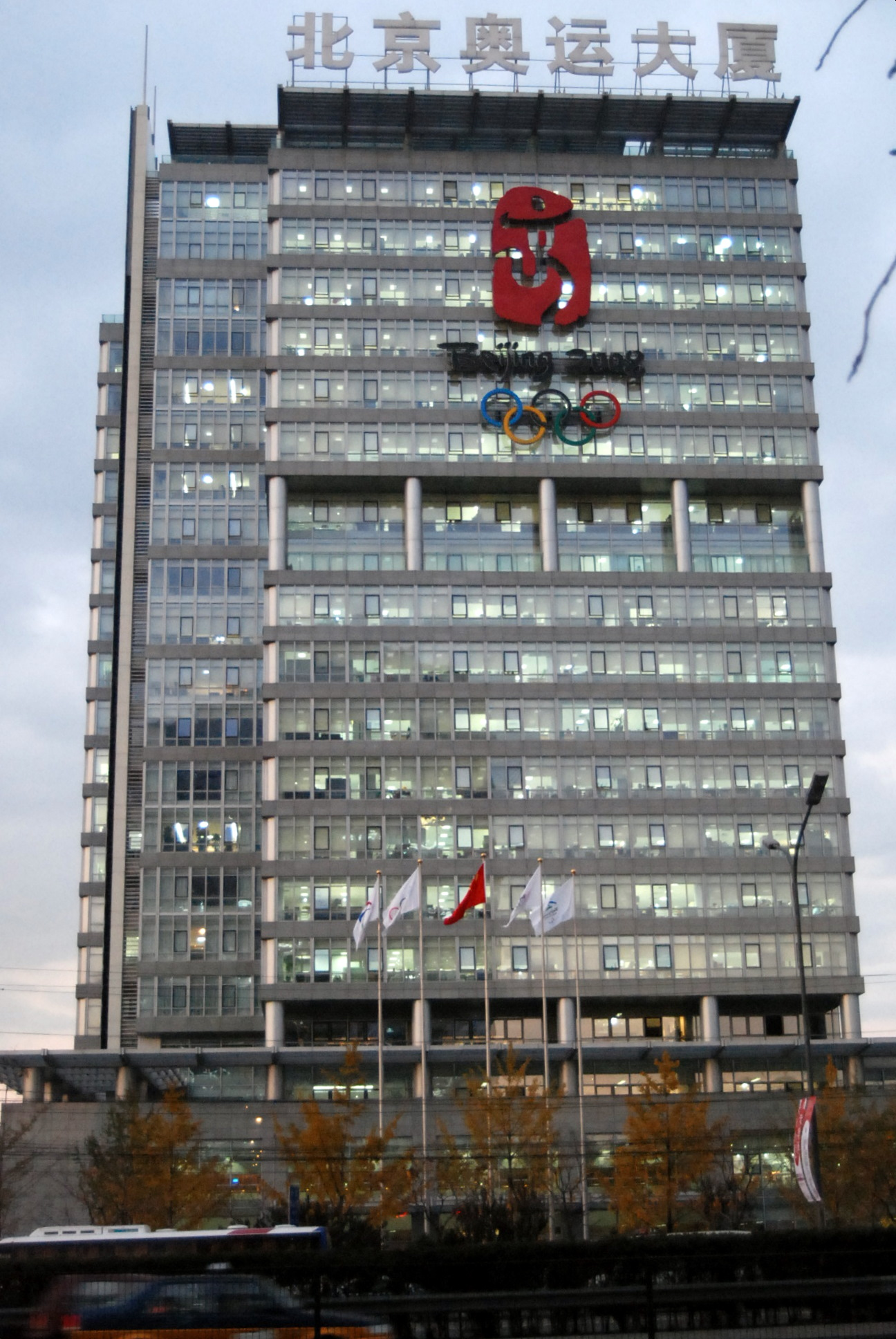
The Beijing Olympic Building in Haidian District was the previous headquarters of the Beijing Municipal Commission of Education

Education in Beijing includes information about primary and secondary schools in Beijing.

The Beijing Municipal Commission of Education is the local education authority.

The institutions listed here are administered by China's Ministry of Education.

== History ==
Beijing education starts in preschool, where children learn intellectual and motor skills through fun activities and games. The second 'level' of education is primary school, where students attend from ages 6 to 12. In Beijing secondary schools, students either follow an academic path or a vocational path. If students choose the academic path, they usually stay in secondary school for 3 years from the ages of 13 to 16, while students who choose the vocational programme will stay in secondary school for 3 to 4 years from the ages of 13 to 16/17.

Just prior to the 1949 founding of the People's Republic of China, Beijing had 13 institutions of higher education, 76 secondary schools, 358 primary schools including those public and private, and 21 nurseries and kindergartens. Of the secondary schools, 80% were private. At the time, 47% of all primary school-aged children in Beijing attended school. Dong Jianhong and Chen Tiying, the authors of "Urban Education in Beijing: An International Perspective," wrote that there were few schools located in poor neighborhoods. Dong Jianhong and Chen Tiying wrote that "education in Beijing lagged far behind" that of the rest of the country prior to the founding of the People's Republic.

Dong Jianhong and Chen Tiying wrote that education in Beijing "developed rapidly" after the 1949 founding. The municipal government established additional higher education facilities, acquired and reorganized schools, established new schools in lower class and working class areas, lowered age limits in the school admission policies, and decreased cutoff scores on achievement tests for working class children during the years 1949 through 1957. Departments of education were established for the Beijing municipality and each of the Beijing districts in 1954.

Dong Jianhong and Chen Tiying wrote that in the Great Leap Forward period school activities were not focused on education and instead were "mostly devoted to political movements and productive labor" which produced a low educational quality. During the period many schools established school-operated factories that their students worked in, and the Beijing educational authorities established part-work part-study experimental schools and work-study programs.

The authorities opened many senior secondary schools and closed many part-study, part-time, and vocational schools during the Cultural Revolution.

In 1986 the starting age for primary education for urban children was changed from 7 to 6.

== Demographics ==
As of 2011, about 30,000 senior high school students resident in Beijing did not have Beijing hukou and attended senior high schools in the cities and towns where their hukou was registered instead of Beijing.

== Research and Innovation ==
Beijing is a world-leading center for scientific and technological innovation. It has been ranked the No. 1 city in the world with the largest scientific research output, as tracked by the Nature Index since the list's inception in 2016. When compared to countries, Beijing ranked above Germany, securing third place worldwide after China and the US, according to the Nature Index for 2025. For example, Beijing's share of the 2024 Nature Index is 5,501.45 with 11,915 counts, while Germany's share is 5,000.90 with 10,559 counts. The capital also leads the world with the highest share of articles published in natural sciences, physical sciences, chemistry, and earth and environmental sciences, especially in the United Nations 17 Sustainable Development Goals (SDGs)-related output. As of 2024, it stands as the most prolific scientific research center in biological sciences and health science in the Asia-Pacific, ranking third and sixth in the world, respectively.

== Universities and colleges ==
Beijing has over 90 public colleges and universities, making it the largest urban public university system in Asia and the first city in China with the most higher education institutions. It is also home to the two best universities (Tsinghua and Peking) in the whole of the Asia & Oceania region and emerging countries, with their rankings at #11 and #13 places in the world, respectively by the 2027 Times Higher Education World University Rankings. Both are members of the C9 League, an alliance of elite Chinese universities offering comprehensive and leading education.

Beijing also has the highest number of universities of any city in the country, representing more than one-fifth of 147 Double First-Class Universities, a national plan to develop elite Chinese universities into world-class institutions by the end of 2050. According to the U.S. News & World Report Best Global University Ranking for 2026-2027, Beijing has the highest number of universities among major cities in the world included in the ranking, totaling 31, with 2 institutions in the top 20, 7 institutions in the top 200 and 12 institutions in the top 500. For the Academic Ranking of World Universities (ARWU) 2026, Beijing has 2 universities in the global top 25, 5 in the top 150, 11 in the top 300, and 16 institutions in the top 500.

A number of Beijing's most prestigious universities consistently rank among the best in the Asia-Pacific and the world, including Peking University, Tsinghua University, Renmin University of China, Beijing Normal University, University of Chinese Academy of Sciences, Beihang University, Beijing Institute of Technology, China Agricultural University, Minzu University of China, University of Science and Technology Beijing, Beijing University of Chemical Technology, University of International Business and Economics, University of Chinese Academy of Social Sciences and Central University of Finance and Economics. These universities were selected as "985 universities" or "211 universities" by the Chinese government in order to build world-class universities.

The capital is a seat of the Chinese Academy of Sciences, which has been consistently ranked the No. 1 research institute in the world by Nature Index since the list's inception in 2014. The academy also runs the University of the Chinese Academy of Sciences, which is located in Beijing and ranked among the world's top five research institutions by the Nature Index. Beijing is also a site of the Chinese Academy of Engineering, the Chinese Academy of Social Sciences, the Chinese Academy of Agricultural Sciences, the China Academy of Chinese Medical Sciences and the National Natural Science Foundation of China.

Some of the national key universities in Beijing are:

- Beijing Forestry University
- Beijing Jiaotong University
- Beijing University of Technology
- Beijing University of Chinese Medicine
- Beijing University of Posts and Telecommunications
- Beijing Electronic Science and Technology Institute
- Beijing Foreign Studies University
- Beijing Language and Culture University
- Beijing Sport University
- Central Conservatory of Music
- Central Academy of Fine Arts
- Central Academy of Drama
- China University of Geosciences (Beijing)
- China University of Petroleum (Beijing)
- China University of Mining and Technology (Beijing)
- China University of Political Science and Law
- China Foreign Affairs University
- Chinese People's Public Security University
- China Women's University
- China Youth University for Political Sciences
- China Institute of Industrial Relations
- Communication University of China
- North China Electric Power University
- Peking Union Medical College
- University of International Relations

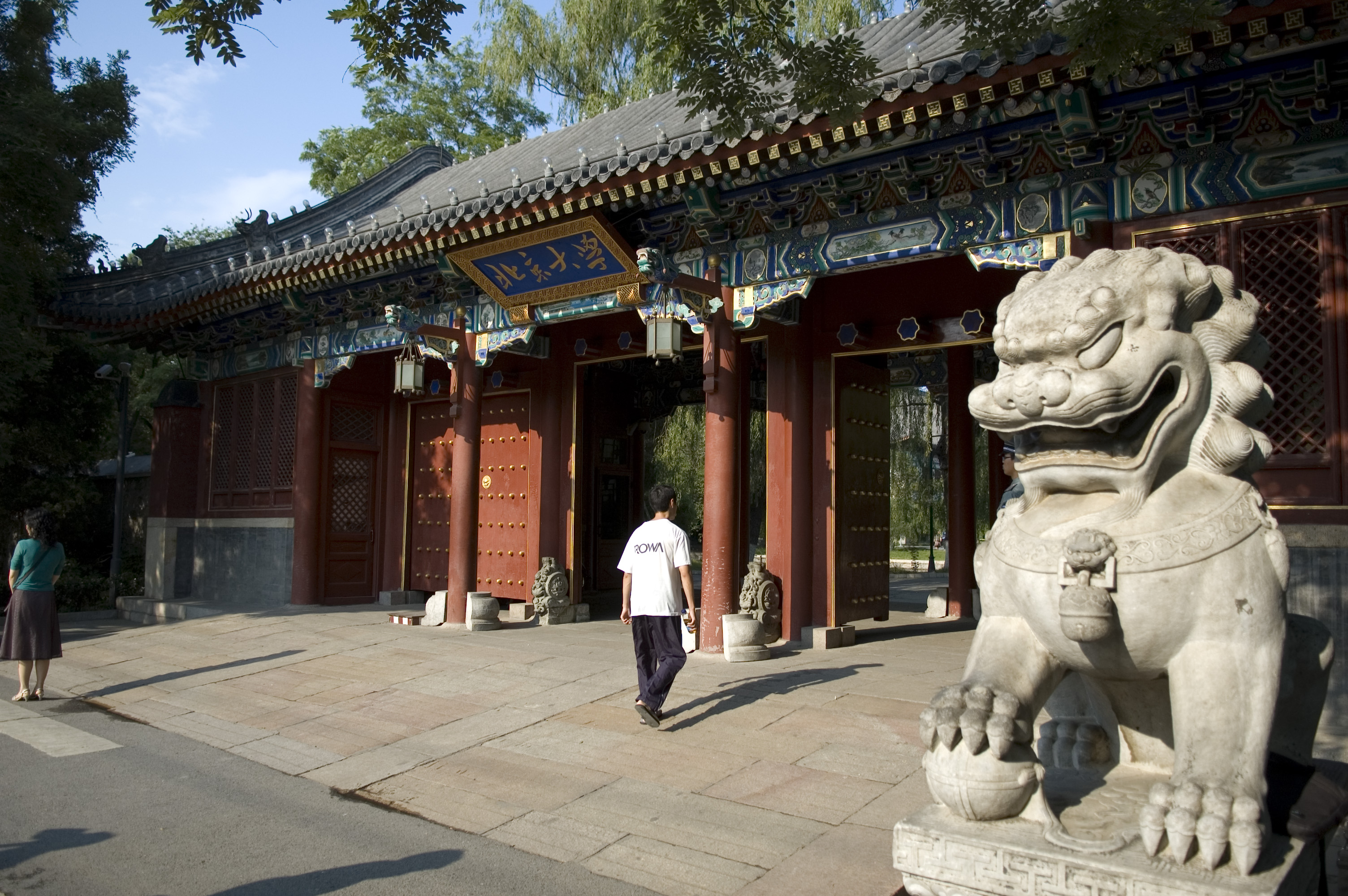
Peking University

Beijing is home to the largest international students population in China and one of the major destinations for foreign students in the Asia-Pacific region. Many international students from Japan, Korea, North America, Europe, Southeast Asia, and elsewhere come to Beijing to study every year.

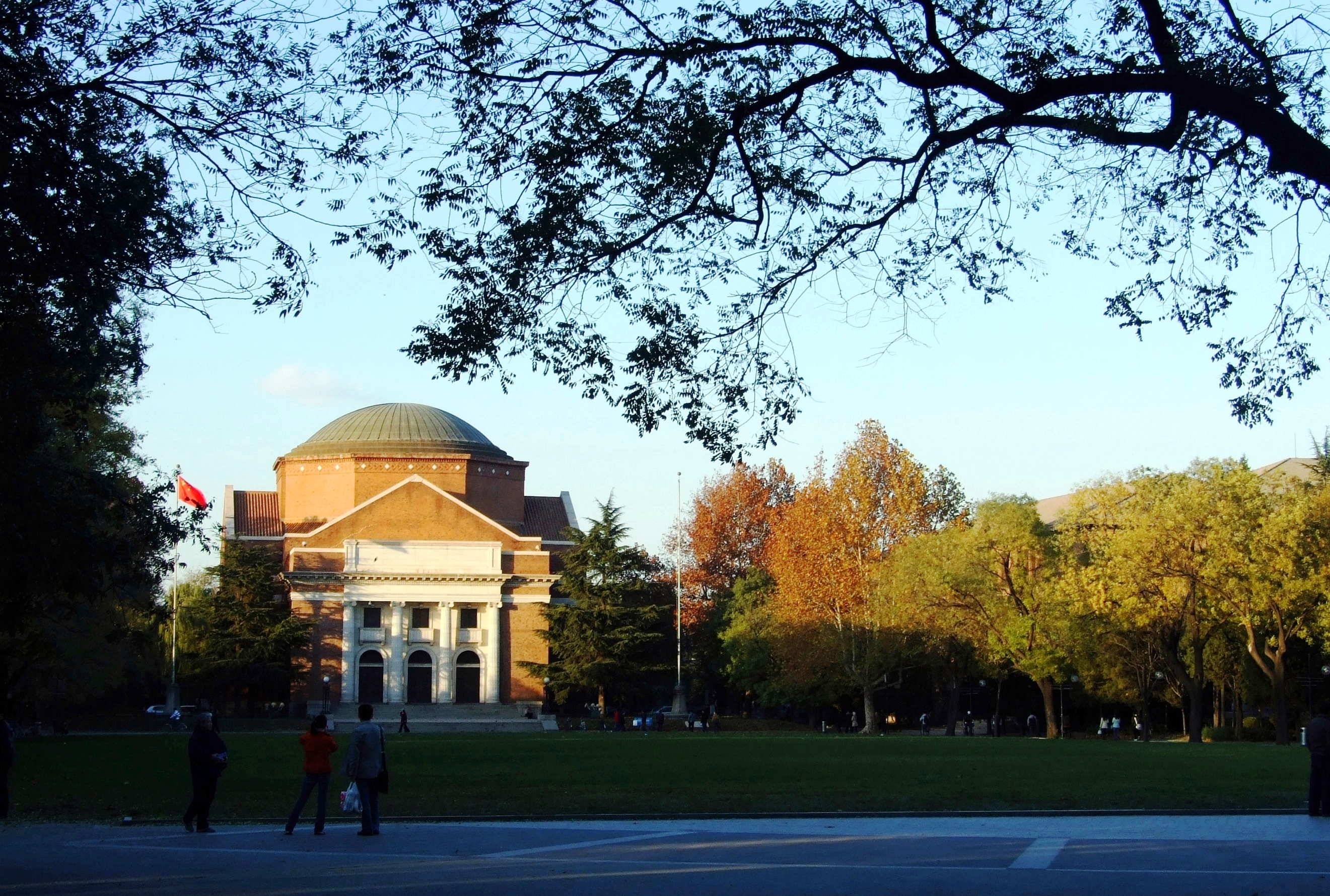
Tsinghua University is a top university in mainland China

As of 2011, according to the Beijing Educational Committee, 700,000 students attend universities based in Beijing. Of those students, according to the committee, 15-20% come from families classified as being in poverty. As of 2011 the municipal government had pledged 50 million yuan ($7.3 million U.S.) as an addition to its funds for assisting university students in poverty.

The first university dedicated for ethnic minority students in Beijing is the Minzu University of China, or the Central University of Nationalities (CUN), established in 1951.

"Moral education" at the university level is integrated into other subjects. Ethnic minorities in Beijing have a higher than average educational attainment at the tertiary level compared to the national average for ethnic minorities. As of 2011 10.8% of ethnic minorities in Beijing have obtained university degrees compared to 0.9% nationally.

Beijing is also home to several religious institutions, Some of them are listed as follows:

- China Islamic Institute (中国伊斯兰教经学院)
- Beijing Islamic Institute (北京伊斯蘭教經學院)
- The Buddhist Academy of China (中国佛学院)
- High-level Tibetan Buddhism College of China (中国藏语系高级佛学院)
- National Seminary of Catholic Church in China (中国天主教神哲学院)

== Primary and secondary education ==
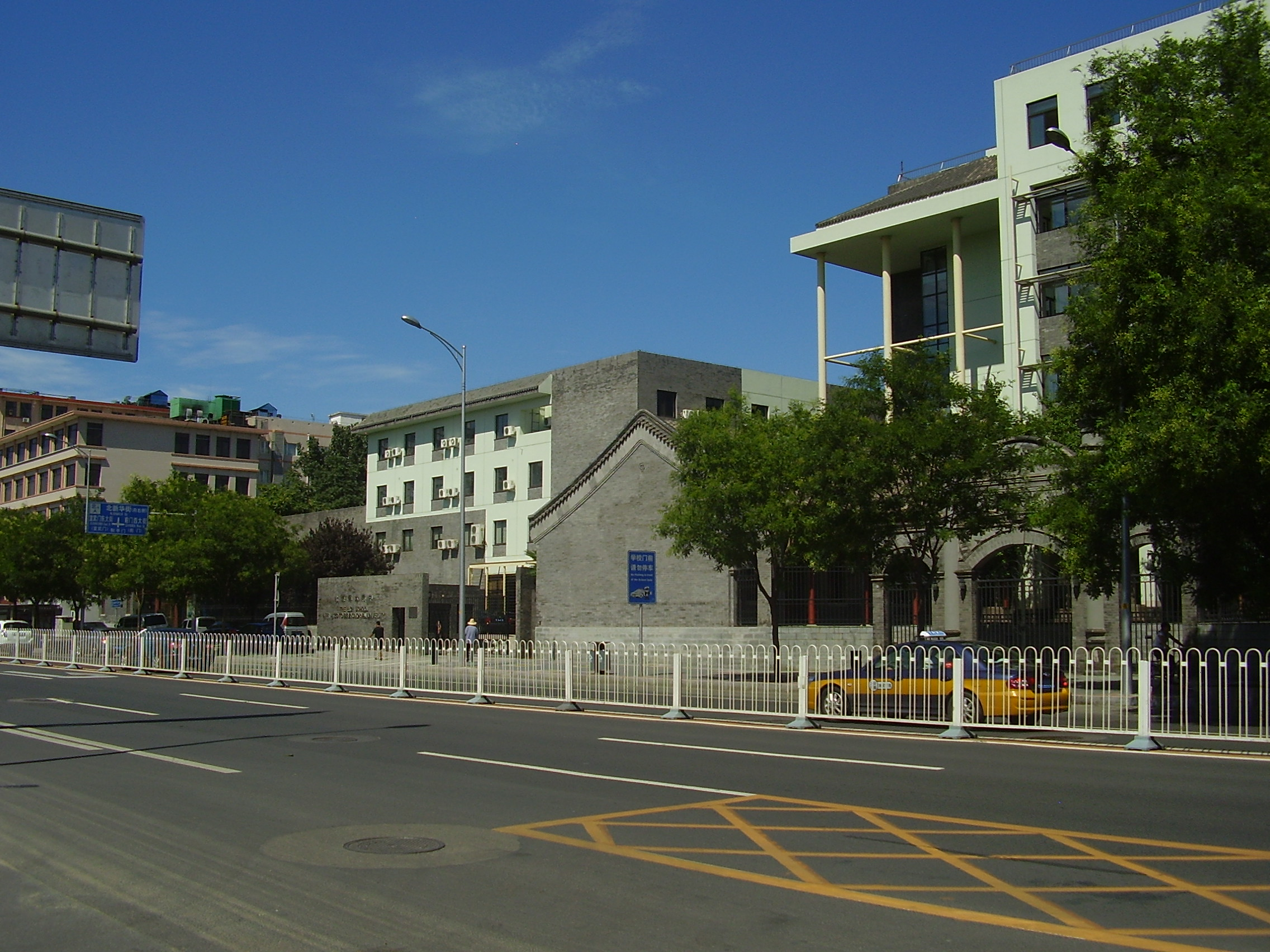
The High School Affiliated to Beijing Normal University

The Beijing municipal government has made efforts to provide a nine-year compulsory education. Several experts, including the Beijing Normal University education specialist Binxian Zhang, have argued that Beijing should make twelve years of education compulsory.

As of June 2010 the Beijing government allowed 75 local public and private schools to teach foreign students. The Beijing Education Commission began accrediting these schools as such in 2003. Foreign students must not make up over 10% of the student body and they must receive instruction in classes with Chinese students. Schools are eligible to receive foreigner students if they were in existence for 10 or more years, had an English-speaking staff member managing foreign student issues, and have training in teaching Chinese as a foreign language.

Beijing's compulsory education system is among the best in the world: in 2018, 15-year-old students from Beijing (together with Shanghai, Zhejiang and Jiangsu) outperformed all of the other 78 participating countries in all categories (math, reading, and science) in the Program for International Student Assessment, a worldwide study of academic performance conducted by the OECD.

=== Statistics on schools ===
As of 2003 Beijing had 1,430 kindergartens, 1,652 primary schools, 730 secondary schools - including 263 combined lower and upper secondary (junior and senior high), 401 lower secondary, and 66 upper secondary - 97 vocational secondary schools, 62 secondary specialty schools, and 74 institutions of higher education. That year there were 199,390 kindergarten students, 546,530 primary school students, 453,446 lower secondary students, 250,959 senior secondary students, 84,262 vocational students, 116,725 secondary specialty students, and 450,789 higher education students.

In 1989 Beijing had 3,703 primary schools, including 695 urban primary schools. Out of the total number of primary schools in urban and rural areas, 38 were designated for ethnic minorities; 23 of the minority schools were located in urban areas. As of 1989, the schools had 934,696 students, including 448,167 students enrolled in urban primary schools. As of 1989, the schools had 49,022 teachers, including 24,641 full-time teachers at the urban schools.

=== Curriculum ===
The curriculum of Beijing primary and secondary schools is a mirror of the national curriculum, because under the Education Law of mainland China, the Ministry of Education coordinates, governs, and plans the curriculum of schools. The Beijing authorities are tasked with implementing the curriculum, because under the Education Act administrative organs at county, township, and administrative village levels implement the curriculum.

Since 1993 schools have divided subjects between those locally arranged and those that are state-arranged. All public schools in Beijing, including those catering to minorities, give instruction in Mandarin Chinese. The standard curriculum includes "moral education" that may be a standalone course or integrated into other courses. Moral education takes up one hour weekly in the primary level, while secondary students have more time per week in moral education. The standard curriculum does not include religion courses. In 2009 the educational authorities inserted components about volunteerism in the curricula of Beijing primary and secondary schools. Secondary schools in Beijing have also implemented citizenship education.

=== School year ===
The school year in Beijing primary and secondary schools is divided into two semesters and schools have five-day-per-week class schedules.

In primary schools there are 38 weeks where classes held, and 13 weeks are allotted to student vacations. The primary schools have one week in reserve. Junior secondary schools have 39 weeks for classes with 12 weeks allotted for student vacations. At the junior secondary level, one week is held in reserve. Senior secondary schools have classes held during 39 weeks with vacation being held on 10 or 11 of these weeks. At the senior secondary level, one or two weeks may be held in reserve.

=== Teacher hiring and payment ===
By 2011 the Municipal Education Committee made efforts to equalize the pay rates of primary and secondary teachers to those of government employees as a way of improving teacher retention. As of 2011, each year there is an oversupply of applications for teaching positions at Beijing primary and secondary schools, and most of the applicants had recently graduated from universities in Beijing.

=== Educational attainment and performance ===
In 1989, within Beijing primary schools, the drop out rate was 0.4% and the enrollment rate was 99.5%.

Ethnic minorities in Beijing have higher levels of educational attainment than ethnic minorities overall. Within Beijing, 15.8% of ethnic minorities finish their education at the primary level while nationally 45% of ethnic minorities finish at the primary level. The odds ratios, meaning the odds of educational attainment in Beijing are 0.12 at the primary level, 1.35 at the junior secondary level, and 11.35 at the senior secondary level.

=== Key secondary schools ===
Some secondary schools are designated as key secondary schools. Beijing had 63 such schools in 1981.

=== Vocational secondary schools ===
In Beijing graduates of junior secondary schools may enter vocational secondary schools. These schools utilize a competitive admissions process. Students may complete specific specialties or courses in three or four years. In 1990 there were 131 vocational secondary schools in urban areas, with a total enrollment of 45,204 students, employing 7,084 teachers and serving 45,204 students. At that time, the schools offered 232 specialties.

The Beijing government established vocational high schools in 1980. That year, there were 52 of these schools serving 4,400 students. At that time they provided 22 professional courses. In one ten-year period, 64,000 people graduated from vocational schools.

=== List of secondary schools ===
Well-known secondary schools in Beijing are:

- Beijing Bayi School
- Beijing Chen Jing Lun High School (北京市陈经纶中学)
- Beijing Huiwen Middle School (北京汇文中学)
- Beijing Jingshan School (北京景山学校)
- Beijing No.2 Middle School (北京市第二中学)
- Beijing No.4 Middle School (北京市第四中学)
- Beijing No.5 Middle School (北京市第五中学)
- Beijing No.8 Middle School (北京市第八中学)
- Beijing No.9 Middle School (北京市第九中学)
- Beijing No.15 Middle School (北京市第十五中学)
- Beijing No.25 Middle School (北京市第二十五中学)
- Beijing 55 Middle School (北京五十五中学)
- Beijing No.80 Middle School (北京市第八十中学)
- Beijing 101 Middle School (北京一零一中学)
- Beijing No.171 Middle School (北京市第一七一中学)
- Beijing Xicheng Foreign Language School (北京市西城区外国语学校)
- High School attached to Capital Normal University (首都师范大学附属中学)
- High School attached to Tsinghua University (清华大学附属中学)
- The Affiliated High School of Peking University (北京大学附属中学)
- The Experimental High School Attached to Beijing Normal University (北京师范大学附属实验中学)
- The High School Affiliated to Renmin University of China (中国人民大学附属中学)
- The High School Attached to Beijing Normal University (北京师范大学附属中学)
- The Second High School Attached to Beijing Normal University (北京师范大学第二附属中学)
- Beijing Dayu Middle School (北京大峪中学)

=== List of primary schools ===
There are many well-known primary schools in the urban area of Beijing.

- Beijing Bayi School
- Beijing First Experiment Primary School (北京第一实验小学)
- Beijing Second Experiment Primary School (北京第二实验小学)
- Beijing Haidian Experiment Primary School (北京海淀实验小学)
- Shijia Primary School (史家小学)
- Beijing Fuxue Primary School (北京府学小学)
- Beijing Jingshan School (北京景山学校)
- Beijing Primary School (北京小学)
- Zhongguancun No.1 Primary School (中关村第一小学)
- Zhongguancun No.2 Primary School (中关村第二小学)
- Zhongguancun No.3 Primary School (中关村第三小学)
- The Elementary School Affiliated to Renmin University of China (中国人民大学附属小学)
- The Experimental Primary School Attached to Beijing Normal University (北京师范大学附属实验小学)

== Preschools and kindergartens ==
Beijing had 3,824 nurseries and kindergartens, including 35 nurseries and kindergartens designated for ethnic minorities and one kindergarten focusing on gymnastics, by 1990. By that year, 41,314 working staff members worked at the schools, which educated around 400,000 students. The enrollment in the nurseries and kindergartens made up 84.5% of urban children above 3 within the designated age group in Beijing.

== International schools ==
Several international schools opened in Beijing in years prior to 1995. The Beijing Education Commission began monitoring international schools in 1995 and began recognizing them in 1996. In 2010 the BEC listed 19 international schools which accept foreigners. Schools designated as "schools for foreign personnel" may not accept mainland Chinese students. In 2019 the median yearly tuition overall was about 219,000 renminbi, the most expensive in the world.

Schools for children of foreign residents include:

- Australian International School Beijing
- Beijing BISS International School
- British School of Beijing
- Canadian International School of Beijing
- Dulwich College Beijing
- Harrow International School Beijing
- The International Montessori School of Beijing
- International School of Beijing
- Korean International School in Beijing
- Lycée Français International de Pékin (French school)
- Western Academy of Beijing
- Yew Chung International School of Beijing - YCIS

Kindergartens for children of foreign residents include:

- EtonHouse International Pre-School
- Sanyi International Kindergarten of Beijing
- The Children's House International Montessori Kindergarten

Other international schools in Beijing listed by the municipality include:

- Beanstalk International Bilingual School
- International Department of Beijing No.4 High School
- Beijing Chaoyang Fangcaodi International School
- Beijing City International School
- Beijing Concord College of Sino-Canada
- Beijing Huijia Private School
- Beijing Royal School
- Beijing World Youth Academy
- High School Affiliated to Renmin University of China Joint Program
- Japanese School of Beijing
- Kaiwen Academy
- National Institute of Technology
- Tsinghua International School
- Springboard International Bilingual School of Beijing
- EtonKids International Kindergarten

Others identifying themselves as such include:

- 3e International School
- Deutsche Botschaftsschule Peking (German school)
- Beijing Saint Paul American School
- Hope International School
