= List of universities and colleges in Beijing =

There are at least 90 Universities and colleges in Beijing, the Chinese capital and city with most higher education institutions nationwide. Most of the colleges and universities are public or affiliated; only a few are privately established.

English name	Chinese name	Type
Peking University	北京大学	National (Direct)
Renmin University of China	中国人民大学	National (Direct)
Tsinghua University	清华大学	National (Direct)
Beijing Jiaotong University	北京交通大学	National (Direct)
Beijing University of Technology	北京工业大学	Municipal
Beihang University	北京航空航天大学	National (Other)
Beijing Institute of Technology	北京理工大学	National (Other)
University of Science and Technology Beijing	北京科技大学	National (Direct)
North China University of Technology	北方工业大学	Municipal
Beijing University of Chemical Technology	北京化工大学	National (Direct)
Beijing Technology and Business University	北京工商大学	Municipal
Beijing Institute of Fashion Technology	北京服装学院	Municipal
Beijing University of Posts and Telecommunications	北京邮电大学	National (Direct)
Beijing Institute of Graphic Communication	北京印刷学院	Municipal
Beijing University of Civil Engineering and Architecture	北京建筑大学	Municipal
Beijing Institute of Petrochemical Technology	北京石油化工学院	Municipal
Beijing Electronic Science and Technology Institute	北京电子科技学院	National (Other)
China Agricultural University	中国农业大学	National (Direct)
Beijing University of Agriculture	北京农学院	Municipal
Beijing Forestry University	北京林业大学	National (Direct)
Peking Union Medical College	北京协和医学院	National (Other)
Capital Medical University	首都医科大学	Municipal
Beijing University of Chinese Medicine	北京中医药大学	National (Direct)
Beijing Normal University	北京师范大学	National (Direct)
Capital Normal University	首都师范大学	Municipal
Capital University of Physical Education and Sports	首都体育学院	Municipal
Beijing Foreign Studies University	北京外国语大学	National (Direct)
Beijing International Studies University	北京第二外国语学院	Municipal
Beijing Language and Culture University	北京语言大学	National (Direct)
Communication University of China	中国传媒大学	National (Direct)
Central University of Finance and Economics	中央财经大学	National (Direct)
University of International Business and Economics	对外经济贸易大学	National (Direct)
Beijing Materials University	北京物资学院	Municipal
Capital University of Economics and Business	首都经济贸易大学	Municipal
China Foreign Affairs University	外交学院	National (Other)
Chinese People's Public Security University	中国人民公安大学	National (Other)
University of International Relations	国际关系学院	National (Direct)
Beijing Sport University	北京体育大学	National (Other)
Central Conservatory of Music	中央音乐学院	National (Direct)
China Conservatory of Music	中国音乐学院	Municipal
Central Academy of Fine Arts	中央美术学院	National (Direct)
Central Academy of Drama	中央戏剧学院	National (Direct)
National Academy of Chinese Theatre Arts	中国戏曲学院	Municipal
Beijing Film Academy	北京电影学院	Municipal
Beijing Dance Academy	北京舞蹈学院	Municipal
Minzu University of China	中央民族大学	National (Other)
China University of Political Science and Law	中国政法大学	National (Direct)
North China Electric Power University	华北电力大学	National (Direct)
China Women's University	中华女子学院	National (Other)
Beijing Information Science and Technology University	北京信息科技大学	Municipal
China University of Mining and Technology (Beijing)	中国矿业大学(北京)	National (Direct)
China University of Petroleum (Beijing)	中国石油大学(北京)	National (Direct)
China University of Geosciences (Beijing)	中国地质大学(北京)	National (Direct)
Beijing Union University	北京联合大学	Municipal
Beijing City University	北京城市学院	Private
China Youth University for Political Sciences	中国青年政治学院	National (Other)
Shougang Institute of Technology	首钢工学院	Municipal
China Institute of Industrial Relations	中国劳动关系学院	National (Other)
Beijing Geely University	北京吉利学院	Private
Kede College, Capital Normal University	首都师范大学科德学院	Private
Canvard College, Beijing Technology and Business University	北京工商大学嘉华学院	Private
Century College, Beijing University of Posts and Telecommunications	北京邮电大学世纪学院	Private
Gengdan Institute, Beijing University of Technology	北京工业大学耿丹学院	Private
Beijing People's Police College	北京警察学院	Municipal
Beijing Hospitality Institute, Beijing International Studies University	北京第二外国语学院中瑞酒店管理学院	Private
University of Chinese Academy of Sciences	中国科学院大学	National (Other)
University of Chinese Academy of Social Sciences	中国社会科学院大学	National (Other)

== Others ==
- Beijing International Chinese College (北京国际汉语学院)
- Central Academy of Arts and Design (中央工艺美术学院), merged into Tsinghua University as Academy of Arts and Design of Tsinghua University (清华大学美术学院) in 1999
- École centrale de Pékin, created in Beijing in 2005
- Peking Medical University, merged into Peking University in 2000
- Yenching University, re-organized and mainly merged into Peking University in 1952, some of the departments merged into Tsinghua University and Renmin University of China

== See also ==
- List of universities in China
- Education in Beijing
