= Yasuzo Shimizu =

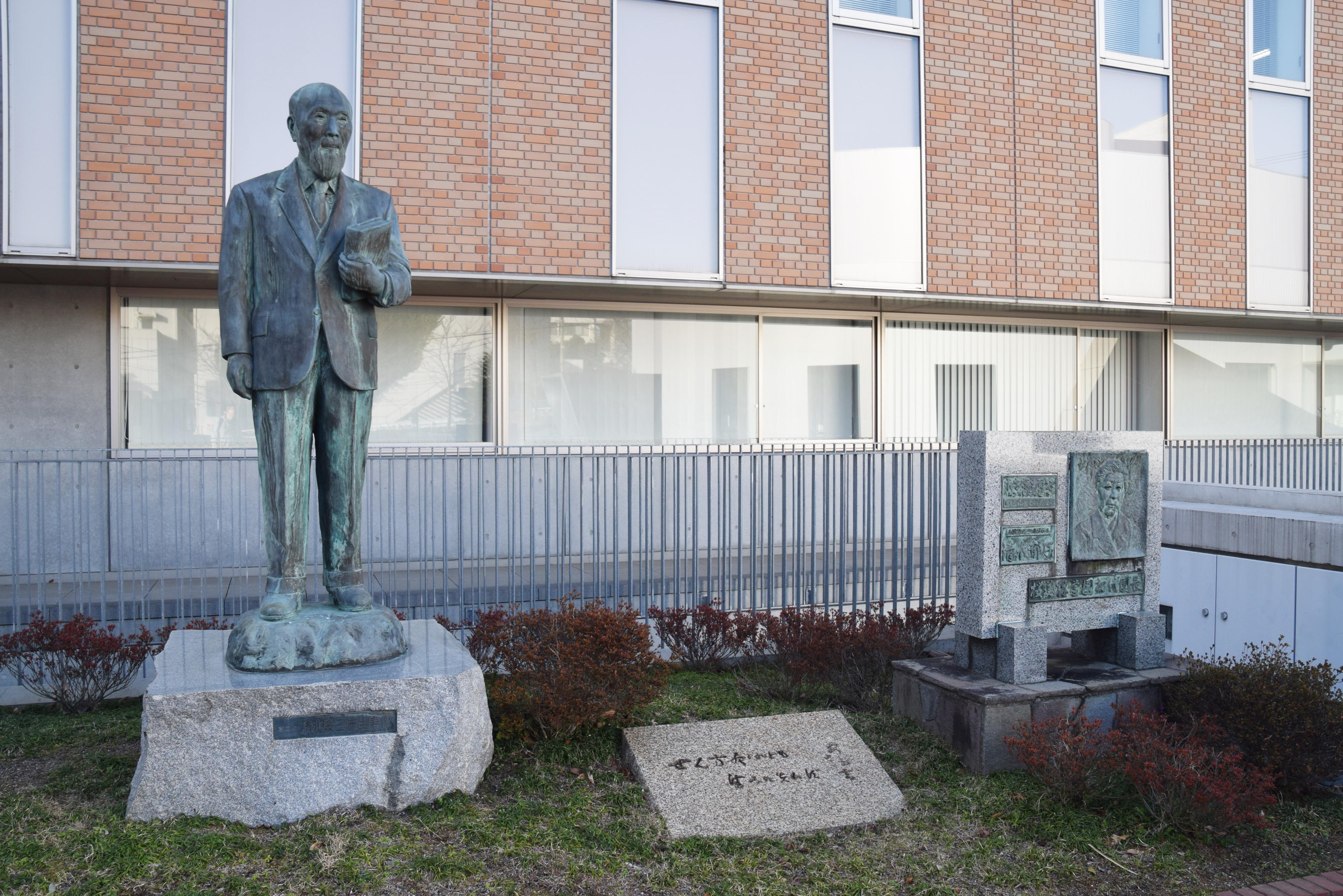
The Statue of Yasuzo Shimizu and the Relief of Ikuko, his wife, on the Fuchinobe Campus of J. F. Oberlin University in Tokyo

Yasuzo Shimizu (清水 安三, Shimizu Yasuzō; June 1, 1891 – January 17, 1988) was a Japanese educator and Protestant Christian missionary in China. He established the Chongzhen School for the poor in Beijing, and the Obirin University in Tokyo.

== General ==
Yasuzo Shimizu was born in Shiga Prefecture, Japan, and became a Christian under the influence of William Merrell Vories, who was in Shiga as an architect and a lay missionary. He graduated from the Theological School of Doshisha University, Kyoto, in 1916, and went to China as a missionary in the following year, first to Dalian, then to Tianjin, and finally to Beijing where he and his wife, Miho (Japanese: 美穂), founded a girls' school for the poor.

In 1924, Shimizu was ordained as a minister in Osaka, and went to U.S. to study at Oberlin College, Ohio, with the financial help of Magosaburō Ōhara, who went on to found the company that would become Kuraray. Upon his return to China, as Miho died of disease, he married Ikuko Koizumi (Japanese: 小泉郁子), and they together expanded the school for the poor, which was later in 1936 renamed as the Chongzhen Middle School (Chinese: 崇貞中學). They also founded the Ailin Hall (Chinese: 愛鄰館), an almshouse.

When World War II ended and as the communists took over China, he was ousted from China, and his school and almshouse were confiscated by the Chinese government. He returned to Japan and founded the Obirin High School in the western suburbs of Tokyo, which would later get expanded to include the Oberlin University.

== See also ==
- J. F. Oberlin University
- Beijing Chen Jing Lun High School
