= Mireille Batamuliza =

Rwandan politician

Mireille Batamuliza is a Rwandan politician and social activist serving as Permanent Secretary at the Ministry of Gender and Family Promotion (MIGEPROF) since 4 November 2021.

== Education ==
Batamuliza holds a master's degree in Social Work from China Women's University, with a focus on Women's Leadership and Social Development, as well as a bachelor's degree in Social Sciences. She has a background in nursing.

== Career ==
Before her appointment, she served as Director General for Family Promotion and Child Rights Protection from August 2020. Previously, she was Director in Social Affairs Department at the Office of the President. She has eight years of experience as a social activist with the Imbuto Foundation, a non-profit organization promoting healthy, educated and prosperous societies.
