= J. F. Oberlin University =

Japanese private university

- 桜美林大学
- J. F. Oberlin University
- Type: Private
- Established: 1921
- President: Hiroaki Hatayama
- Faculty: 976
- Undergraduates: 10,514
- Postgraduates: 238
- Other students: 19 (Non-Degree)
- Location: Machida, Tokyo, Japan; 35.581°N 139.408°E
- Campus: Suburban
- Colors: Maroon and gold
- Website: www.obirin.ac.jp

J. F. Oberlin University (桜美林大学, Ōbirin daigaku) is a private university in Machida, Tokyo, Japan. The university also has campuses in Shinjuku and Tama (both in Tokyo), Fuchinobe (Kanagawa), and Hakuba (Nagano).

== History ==
The university was founded in 1946 by Yasuzo Shimizu. Its name is derived from that of pastor and philanthropist J. F. Oberlin, and the name also shows the university's historical ties with Oberlin College in Oberlin, Ohio, which the university's founder attended. In 2006, the English version of the school name was changed from Obirin Gakuen to J. F. Oberlin University.

The junior college of Oberlin University was founded in 1950 and became coeducational in 1999. It was closed in 2007.

== Faculties ==
Includes the Colleges of:

- Arts and Sciences
- Aviation Management
- Business Management
- Education and Social Transformation
- Global Communication
- Health and Welfare
- Performing and Visual Arts

== Notable alumni and faculty ==
- Yinling: Japan-based swimsuit model, race queen, singer and former professional wrestler
- Yuka Kashino: member of technopop group Perfume
- Ayano Ōmoto: member of technopop group Perfume
- Matt Kuwata: tarento, model, and musician
