= Shandong Women's University =

Women's university in Shandong, China

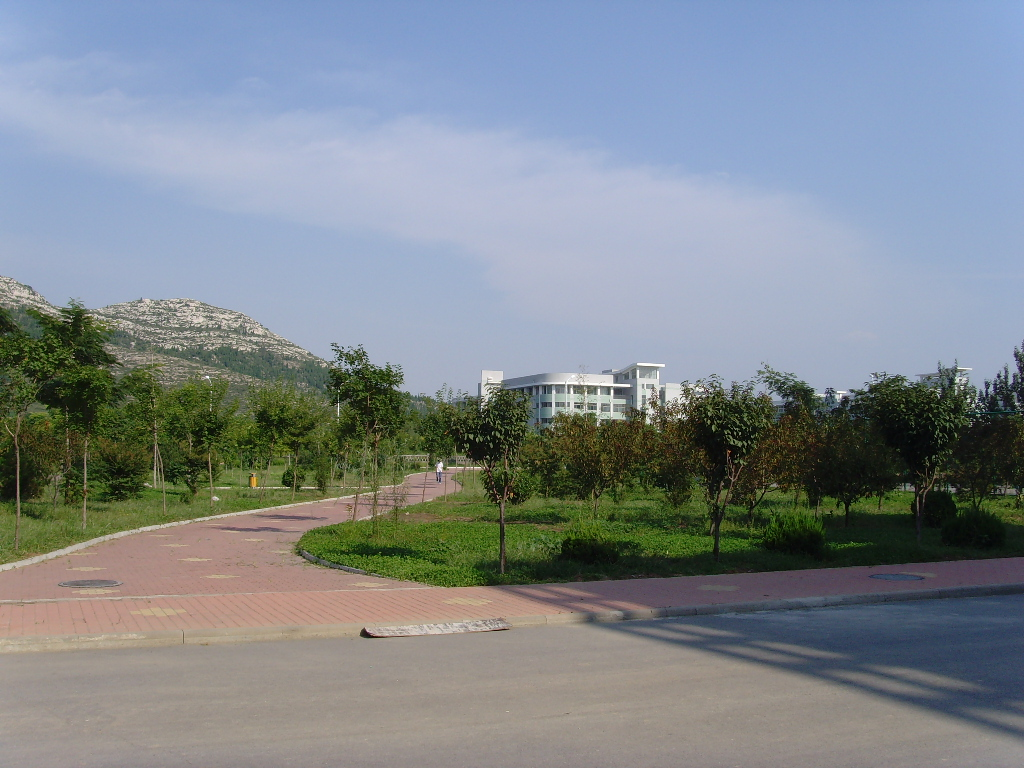
main campus

Shandong Women's University (simplified Chinese: 山东女子学院; traditional Chinese: 山東女子學院; pinyin: Shāndōng Nǚzǐ Xuéyuàn) is a women's university in Jinan, Shandong.

== History ==
The Shandong Women's Cadre School (Chinese: 山东省妇女干部学校) was founded in May 1952, with the primary goal of providing short-term training courses for female cadres. The school closed in February 1961 and was reopened in November 1979. In December 1987, it was renamed the Shandong branch of the China Women's Management Cadre College, making it a full-time adult higher education institution. In August 1995, its name was changed to Shandong Branch of China Women's University. In March 2010, it was formally renamed Shandong Women's College and became a general undergraduate institution. By 2014, it had joined the China Women's Higher Education Institution Union. It was approved in 2022 to offer a specialised women's studies program. By 2024, it will be a designated project unit in Shandong Province, authorised to issue master's degrees.

The number of students in 2022 was 16,588. It offers 44 majors. It offers courses in literature, engineering and art, education, law, etc. The college also accepts male students.

== Ranking ==
It ranks 463rd in mainland China university ranking in 2024, while the major "Preschool Education" gets highly praised.
