= International School of Beijing =

School in Beijing, China

- 北京顺义国际学校

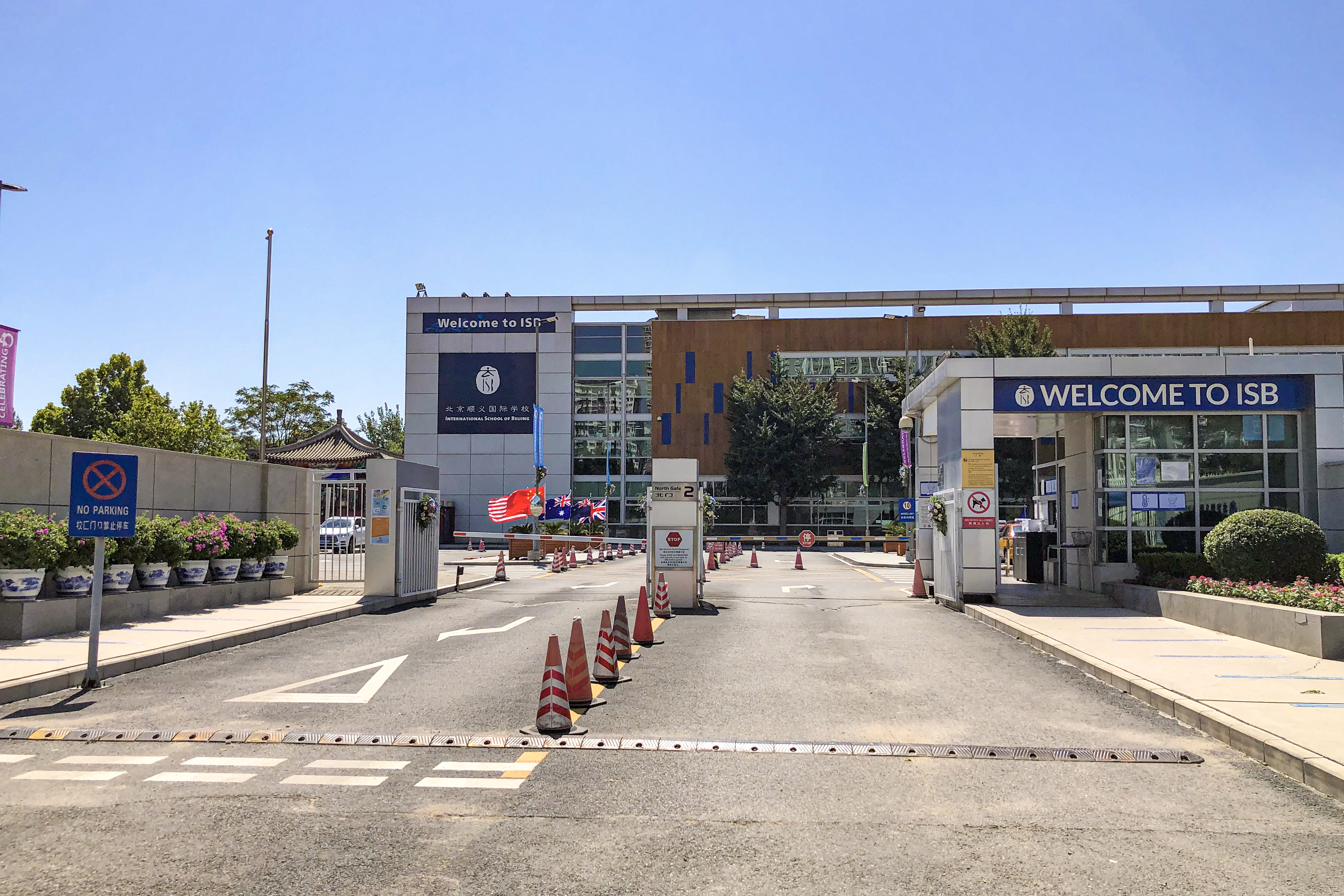
- North gate 2

Location
- No. 10, Anhua Street, Shunyi District, Beijing 101318 (Note: Address in Chinese: 北京市顺义区安华街10号 邮编101318); China; 40°04′42″N 116°31′08″E

Information
- Other name: ISB
- Type: Private international day school
- Established: 1980; 46 years ago
- Authority: Beijing Education Commission; Beijing Municipal Education Bureau
- Head of School: Daniel K. Rubenstein
- Grades: EY2–12
- Enrollment: 1,780
- Campus size: 13 hectares (32 acres)
- Colors: Blue and white
- Mascot: Dragon
- Accreditations: New England Association of Schools and Colleges; Council of International Schools; International Baccalaureate Organization; National Center for School Curriculum and Textbook Development
- Affiliations: East Asia Regional Council of Overseas Schools; National Association of College Admissions Counselors
- Website: www.isb.cn

International School of Beijing
- Simplified Chinese: 北京顺义国际学校
- Traditional Chinese: 北京順義國際學校
- Literal meaning: Beijing Shunyi International School
Transcriptions
Standard Mandarin
- Hanyu Pinyin: Běijīng Shùnyì Guójì Xuéxiào

The International School of Beijing (ISB, Chinese: 北京顺义国际学校) is a non-profit international co-educational day school in Beijing, China. The school was founded in 1980; it is the oldest and largest international school in Beijing. ISB accepts students from Early Years 2 to Grade 12. ISB offers a dual English and Chinese language program for students from Early Years to Grade 5. It also offers the International Baccalaureate Diploma Program in Grades 11 and 12. ISB is recognized by the Beijing Education Commission (BEC) as an independent school for expatriate children.

== History ==
In the 1970s, a small foreign school was established in Beijing, under the auspices of the United States Liaison Office in Beijing, precursor to the US Embassy. Classes were held in a hallway of a diplomatic apartment compound in Sanlitun, with 8 students and 2 certified teachers.

In 1980, the US Embassy merged its school with those of the British and Australian embassies. The Canadian and New Zealand embassies joined in, and the five nations together formally founded the International School of Beijing. Located on the grounds of the US Embassy, the school provided education for the children of the five founding embassies; eventually, as space allowed, children from other embassies were permitted to enroll. Bound by the strict requirements imposed on diplomatic schools, the founding embassies worked to meet educational needs of the growing expatriate community in Beijing.

In 1988 under new regulations, China's Ministry of Foreign Affairs officially registered ISB as a "school for diplomatic children." The campus moved to the Lido complex of offices and housing units, and the school was permitted to accept applications from all expatriate residents of Beijing.

In 1991 ISB became the first school in Beijing to offer the full Diploma Program of the International Baccalaureate Organization. And in 1997, the school was accredited by WASC (in the United States).

In January 2002, the Beijing Municipal Education Bureau allowed ISB to be restructured as an "independent school for foreign children". In the same year, the school moved to a 13-hectare (32-acre), purpose-built facility in the Shunyi district, a northeastern suburb of Beijing. The following year, ISB was accredited by the Chinese authority National Center for School Textbook and Curriculum Development.

ISB completed the construction of a detached sports facility in 2013, complete with two pressurized domes with air filtration, providing indoor tennis courts and a playing field area.

== Campus ==
ISB is situated on a 13-hectare (32-acre) campus in Shunyi district, approximately 30 minutes from downtown Beijing and close to expatriate residential compounds. Two purpose-built sports domes sit side by side over 8,500 square meters. The sports domes have H-14 grade filtration systems. In addition, ISB has four fully equipped gymnasiums (one with a climbing wall); baseball and softball diamonds; two full-sized turf soccer fields; a rugby pitch, running track, and a 665-seat stadium and an aquatics center with a 25-meter pool and diving boards.

In the main school building are 12 science labs, a student cooking lab, a visual arts wing in middle and high school, and art studios in elementary school. The performing arts wing consists of a 600-seat theater, Black Box theater, rehearsal space, and studio stage. The main school building also has two library-media centers with more than 82,000 volumes and over 160 magazine subscriptions. ISB supports a one-to-one MacBook laptop program for each student in grades 2 through 12.

In 2020, the school opened four new facilities: an early years learning center, an elementary school arts and theater, middle and high school performing arts center, and a middle and high school art and design center.

In 2023, ISB added a Middle School Playground, Golf Simulators, and 1323 Solar Panels, aligning with the school's sustainability goals.

In 2024, the ISB Commons was constructed to form the new main entrance to the school. The Commons also houses a Jamaica Blue café.

== Organization ==
ISB is a non-profit school governed by a 12-member Board of Trustees. These 12 volunteers are responsible for setting and approving school policy, overseeing ISB's financial status, recruiting, supporting and evaluating the Head of School and guiding strategic direction of the school, and sets goals to fulfill its responsibilities and establishes standing committees to manage its work.

== Accreditations ==
The ISB is accredited with the New England Association of Schools and Colleges (NEASC) in the United States; the Council of International Schools and the International Baccalaureate Organization in Europe; and the National Center for School Curriculum and Textbook Development (NCCT) in China.

ISB is a member of the East Asia Regional Council of Overseas Schools (EARCOS) and the National Association of College Admissions Counselors (NACAC).

== Notable alumni ==
- Joe Alexander – American-Israeli professional basketball player in the Israeli Basketball Premier League
- Camille Cheng – Olympic swimmer
- Yu Shuran – Figure skater
- Dyah Roro Esti Widya Putri - Member of Parliament, Indonesia at the People's Representative Council
- Will Tschetter - American basketball player for the Michigan Wolverines
