= Beijing–Hong Kong Universities Alliance =

Inter-university conference

- 京港大学联盟
- Abbreviation: BHUA
- Formation: April 2018; 8 years ago
- Headquarters: Beijing, China
- Members: 20 universities
- Website: bh.ualliance.bici.org

Chinese name
- Simplified Chinese: 京港大学联盟
- Traditional Chinese: 京港大學聯盟
Transcriptions
Standard Mandarin
- Hanyu Pinyin: Jīnggǎng Dàxué Liánméng

Beijing–Hong Kong Universities Alliance (BHUA) is an inter-university conference of 20 public universities in Beijing and Hong Kong. It was established in April 2018.

== List of member institutions ==
=== Beijing ===
- Tsinghua University
- Peking University
- Renmin University of China
- University of Chinese Academy of Sciences
- Beihang University
- Beijing Foreign Studies University
- Beijing Institute of Technology
- Beijing Normal University
- Beijing University of Technology
- Capital Medical University
- Capital Normal University
- Capital University of Economics and Business

=== Hong Kong ===
- University of Hong Kong
- Hong Kong University of Science and Technology
- City University of Hong Kong
- Hong Kong Baptist University
- Lingnan University
- Chinese University of Hong Kong
- Education University of Hong Kong
- Hong Kong Polytechnic University

(Source)
