= Beijing Chen Jing Lun High School =

Public school in Beijing, China

Coordinates: 39°55′12″N 116°26′29″E

- 北京陈经纶中学
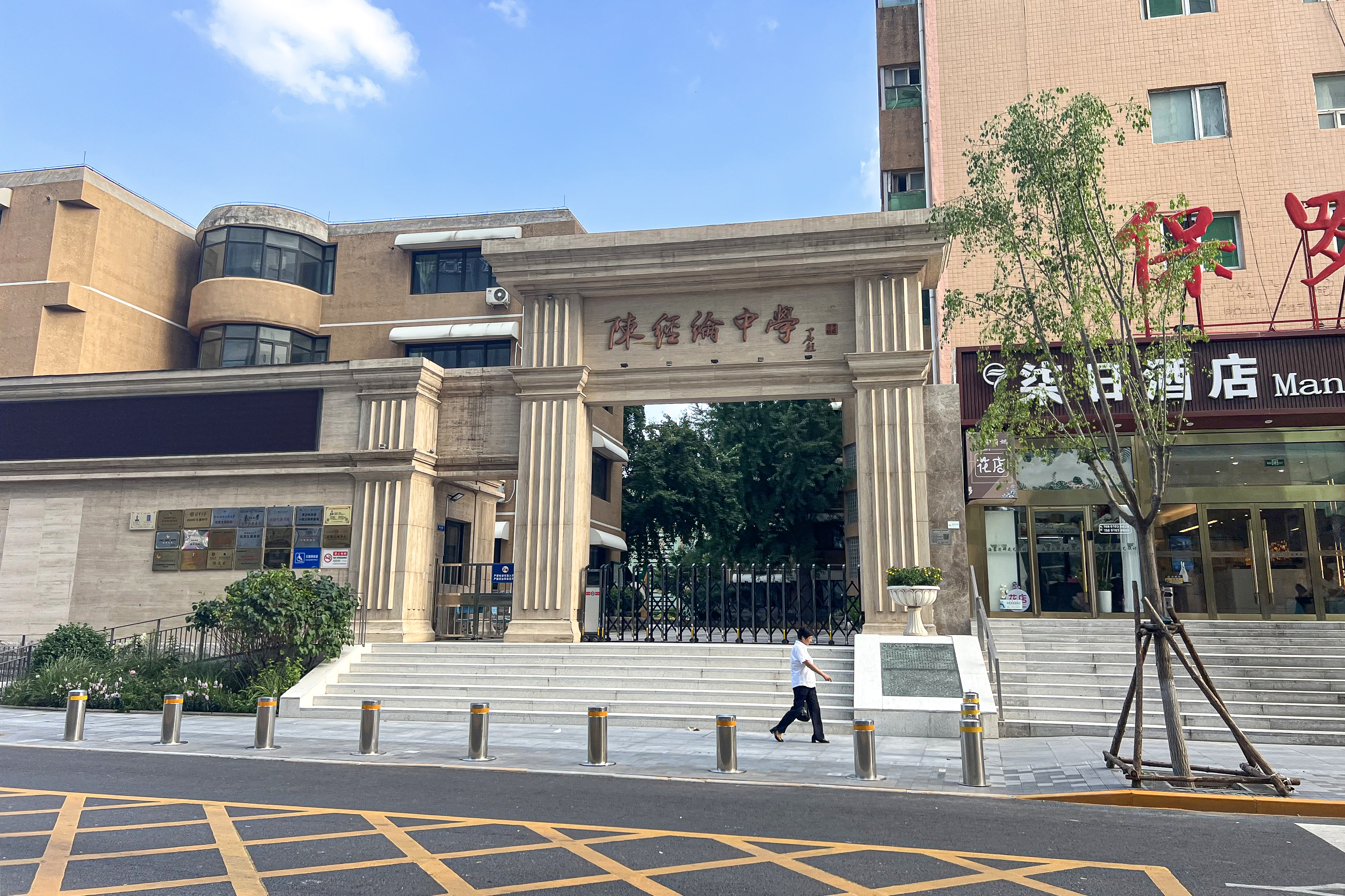
- North gate

Location
- 38 Chaoyangmenwai Dajie, Chaoyang District; Beijing, Beijing; China

Information
- Type: Public
- Motto: Honesty, Perseverance, Diligence and Innovation 老实 谊强 勤奋 创新
- Established: 1921
- Headmaster: Zhang Deqing (张德庆)
- Staff: 1030
- Faculty: 2000
- Enrollment: 2400<
- Website: bjcjl.net

Beijing Chen Jing Lun High School
- Simplified Chinese: 北京市陈经纶中学
- Traditional Chinese: 北京市陳經綸中學
- Literal meaning: Beijing Chen Jinglun Secondary School
Transcriptions
Standard Mandarin
- Hanyu Pinyin: Běijīng Chén Jīnglún Zhōngxué

Beijing Chen Jing Lun High School (北京市陈经纶中学; BJCJL) is a public secondary school in Chaoyang, Beijing, China.

== History ==
In 1919, there was a severe drought in northern China. Shimizu Yasuzo called on people to contribute funds for disaster relief and built a shelter for disaster children outside Chaoyangmen. He drove a carriage to the disaster area every day to adopt disaster children from village to village, with a total number of nearly 800.

In order to save the unfortunate girls, Shimizu funded the establishment of Chongzhen Girls' Academy (崇贞女子学园) in the disaster-stricken area in 1921. As the founders of the academy, Shimizu Yasuzo and his wife Shimizu Miho worked day and night for the development of the academy. On May 28, 1921, Chongzhen Academy was formally established.

With the founding of the People's Republic of China, the school was transferred to the Beijing Municipal Education Bureau to become a public school. The school was renamed Beijing Girls' No. 4 Middle School (北京第四女子中学) and only admitted female students. Shimizu Yasuzo and his wife Shimizu Miho returned to Japan.

In 1976, Beijing Girls’ No. 4 Middle School was renamed Chaoyang Middle School (朝阳中学). In 1991, Hong Kong entrepreneur Chan King-luen donated 20 million yuan to Chaoyang Middle School to renovate the old campus. At the same time, the school was named Beijing Chen Jing Lun Middle School (北京市陈经纶中学) by the Beijing municipal government.

== See also ==
- Beacon high schools in Beijing
- Beijing No.80 Middle School
