= Beijing City University =

Private college in Haidian, Beijing, China

Coordinates: 40.0903°N 116.2523°E

- 北京城市学院 (Chinese)
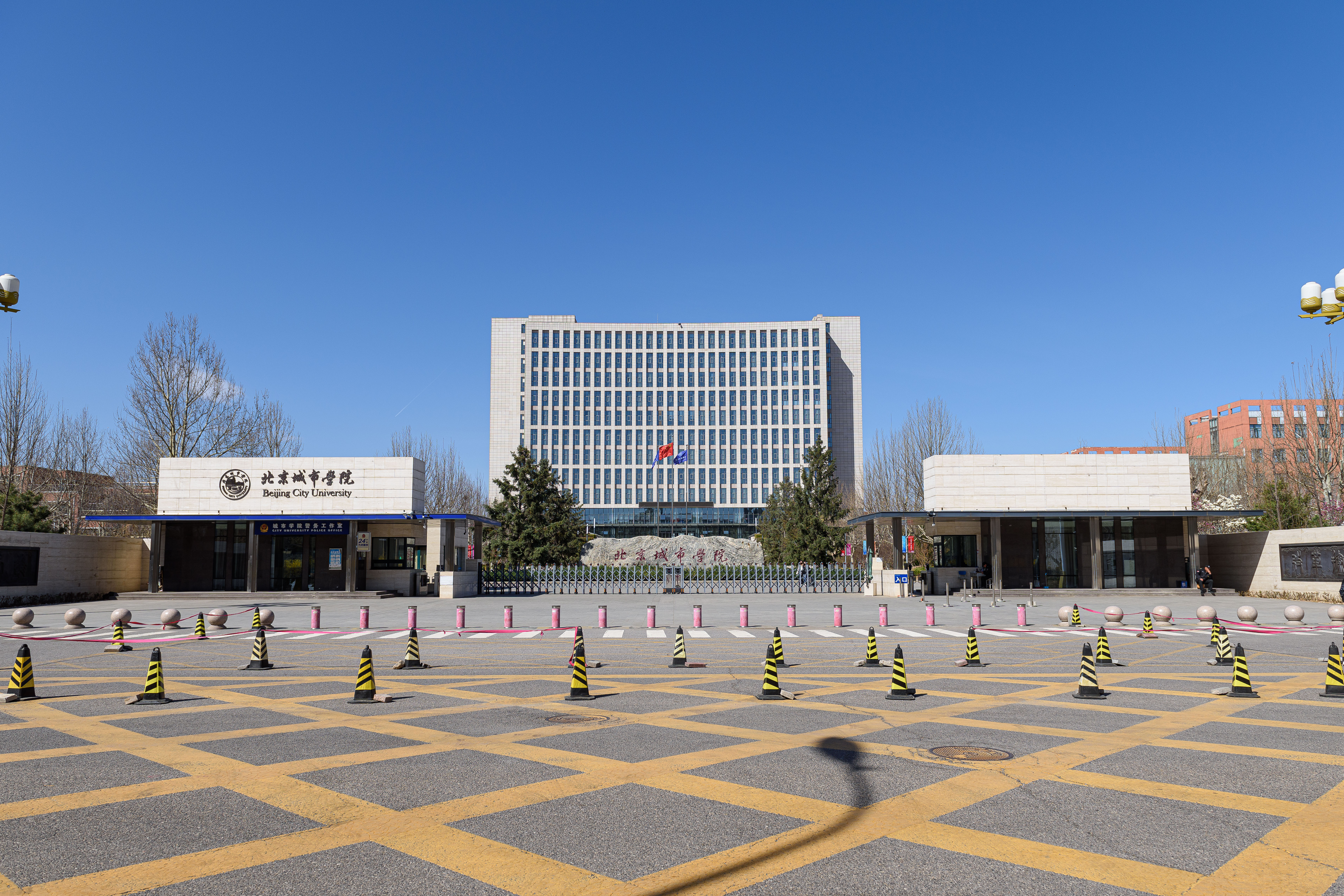
- Shunyi campus
- Motto: 改革探索 勤奋进取 艰苦创业 开拓前进
- Type: Private University, Comprehensive School
- Established: Established 1984; 41 years ago Reformed 2003; 22 years ago
- Rector: Liu Lin (刘林)
- Administrative staff: 2800
- Students: 28000
- Address: No.269, North 4th Ring Middle Road, Haidian, Beijing, China 100083
- Website: www.bcu.edu.cn

Chinese name
- Simplified Chinese: 北京城市学院
- Traditional Chinese: 北京城市學院
Transcriptions
Standard Mandarin
- Hanyu Pinyin: Běijīng Chéngshì Xuéyuàn

Beijing City University (北京城市学院; lit. 'Beijing City College') is a private university in Haidian, Beijing, China. The school, initially named 海淀走读大学 ('Haidian Non-Boarding University '), was established in 1984. as a private career college, the first in its kind in socialist China. The name of the institution was formally changed to 'Beijing City University' in 2003. Despite the name, the institution is not considered to have full university status, although it has been authorized to offer undergraduate and graduate-level education and degrees.

== See also ==
- List of universities in China
- Education in Beijing
