= Beijing Municipal Education Commission =

Government organization in Beijing, China

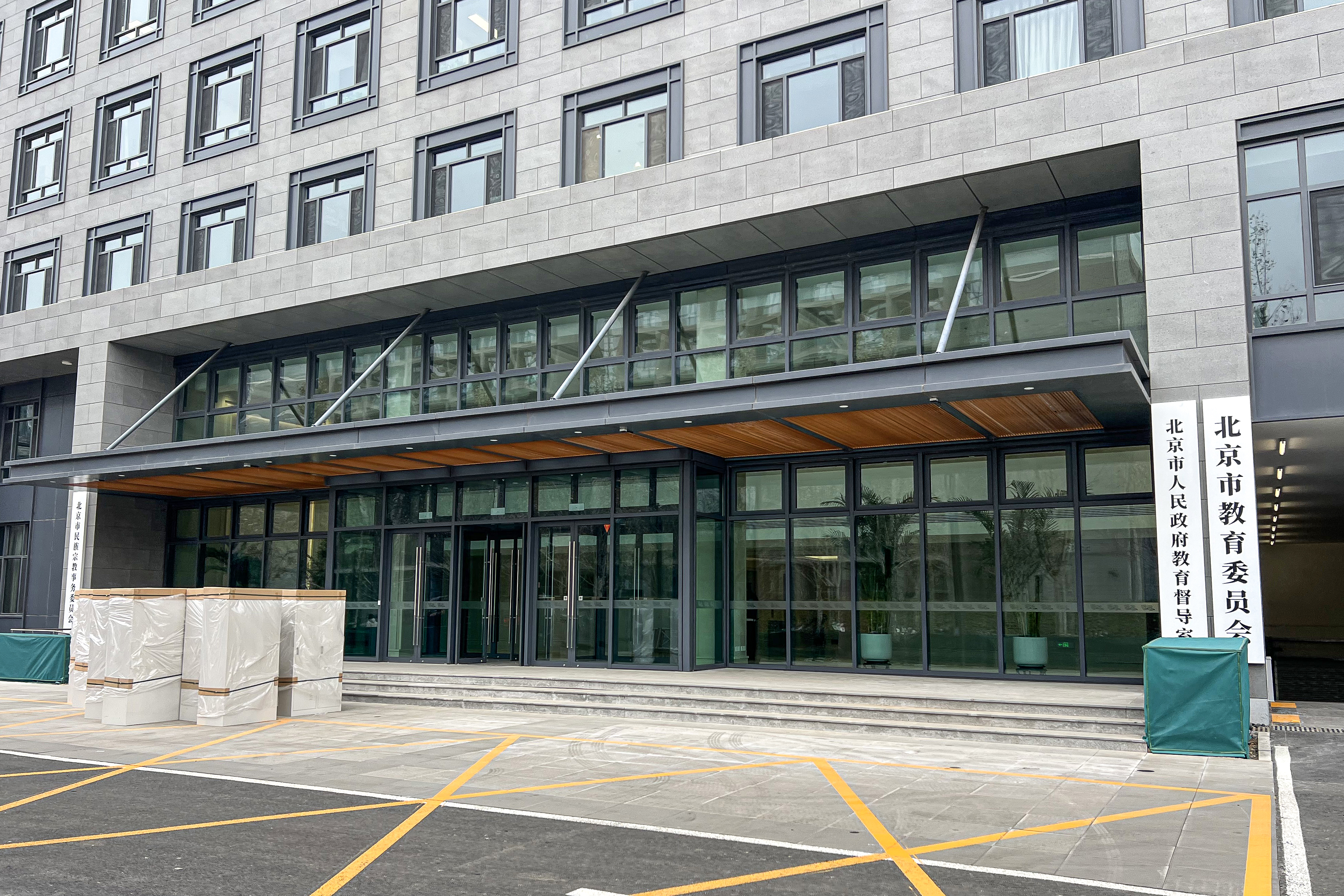
The current office of Beijing Municipal Education Commission is located in Luyuan Subdistrict, Tongzhou District

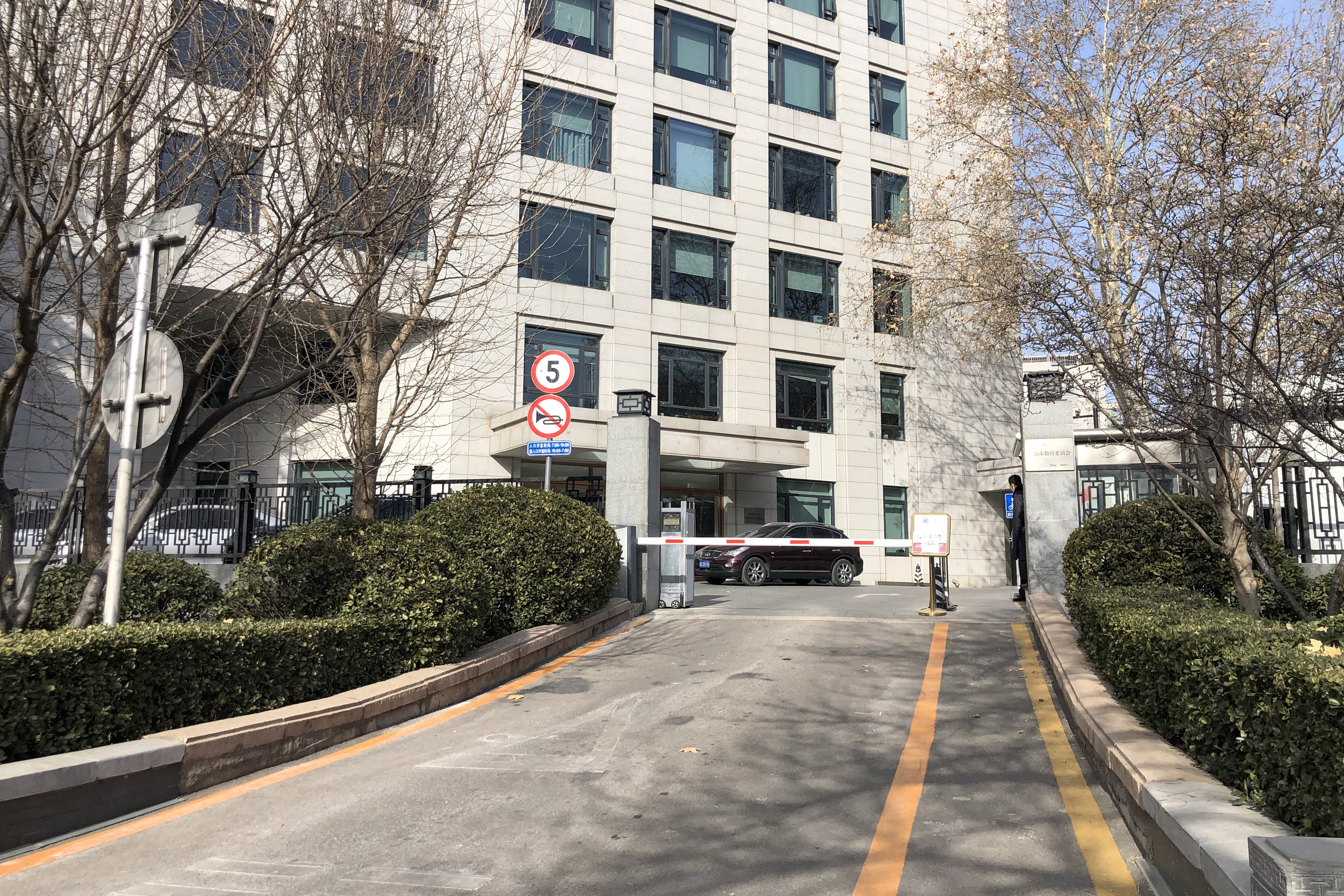
Beijing Municipal Education Commission office was once located at 109 Qianmen West Street, Xicheng District

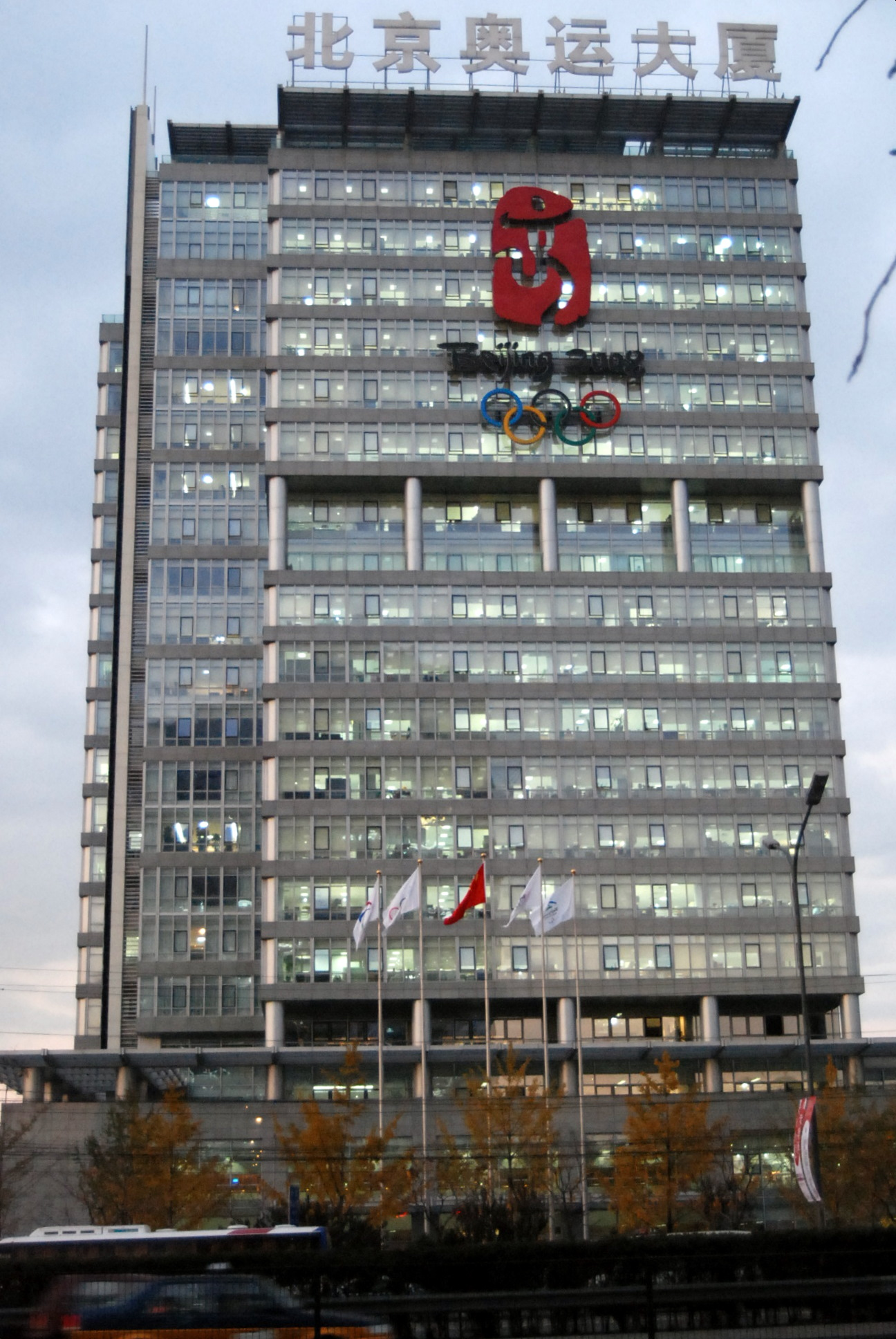
The Beijing Olympic Building in Haidian District was the previous headquarters of the Beijing Municipal Education Commission

The Beijing Municipal Education Commission (北京市教育委员会) is the municipal education authority of the Beijing Municipal People's Government. It is currently located at 109 Qianmen West Street, Xicheng.

== See also ==
- Education in Beijing
- Lists of schools in Beijing
