= University of the Chinese Academy of Sciences =

Public university headquartered in Beijing, China

- 中国科学院大学
- Former names: Graduate School of the University of Science and Technology of China (1978–1986); University of Science and Technology of China Graduate School (Beijing) (1986–2000); Graduate School of the Chinese Academy of Sciences (2000–2012)
- Motto: 博學篤志，格物明德
- Type: Public university
- Established: 2012; 14 years ago
- Parent institution: Chinese Academy of Sciences
- Affiliations: BHUA, APRU
- President: Li Shushen
- Faculty: 15,950 (2020)
- Students: 57,651 (2020)
- Undergraduates: 1,645 (2020)
- Postgraduates: 54,255 (2020)
- Location: Beijing, China
- Campus: Multiple sites
- Colours: Blue
- Website: ucas.ac.cn english.ucas.ac.cn

Chinese name
- Simplified Chinese: 中国科学院大学
- Traditional Chinese: 中國科學院大學
Transcriptions
Standard Mandarin
- Hanyu Pinyin: Zhōngguó Kēxuéyuàn Dàxué
Yue: Cantonese
- Jyutping: Zung1 gwok3 fo1 hok6 jyun6-2 daai6 hok6

Guokeda
- Simplified Chinese: 国科大
- Traditional Chinese: 國科大
Transcriptions
Standard Mandarin
- Hanyu Pinyin: Guókēdà

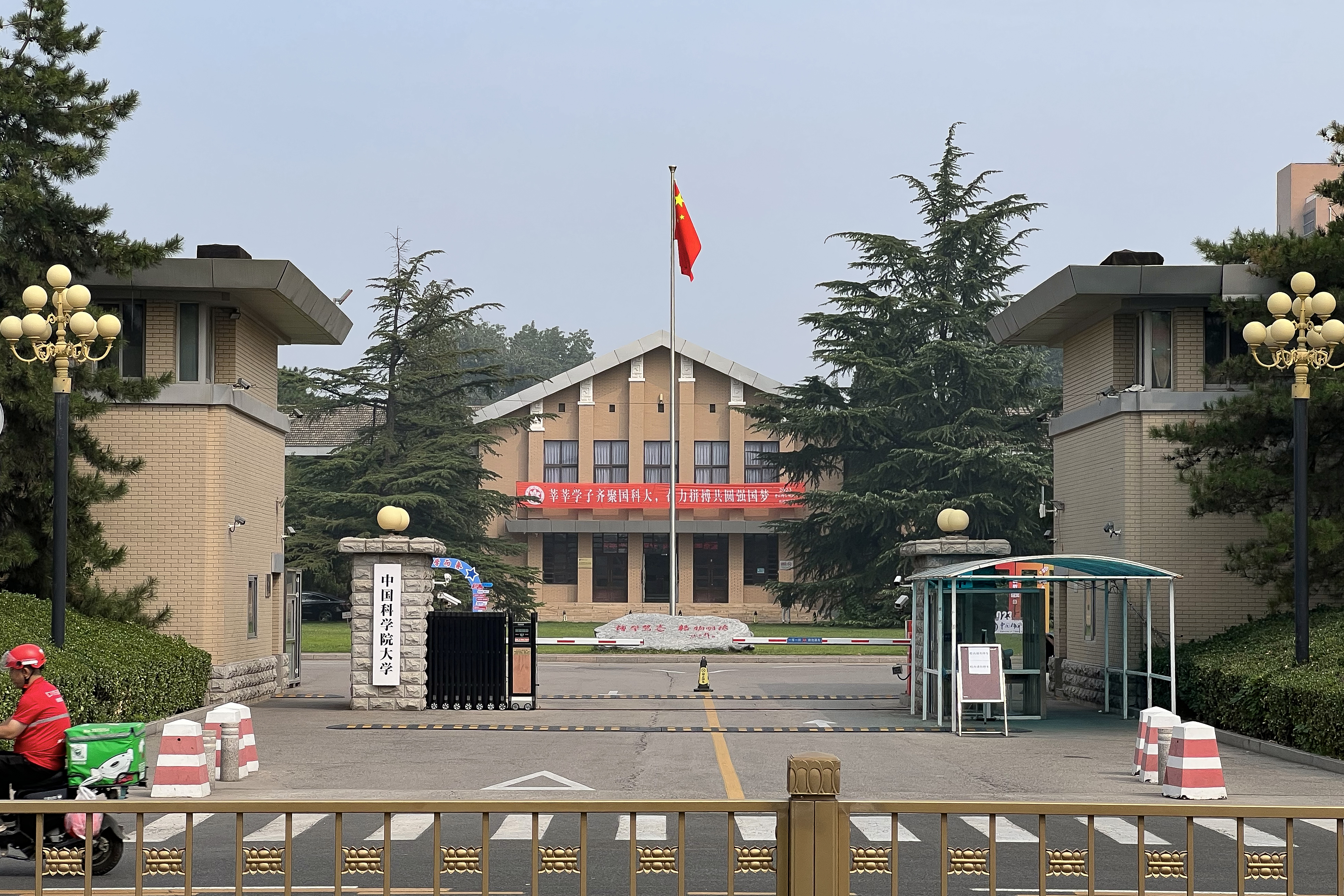
UCAS Yuquanlu campus

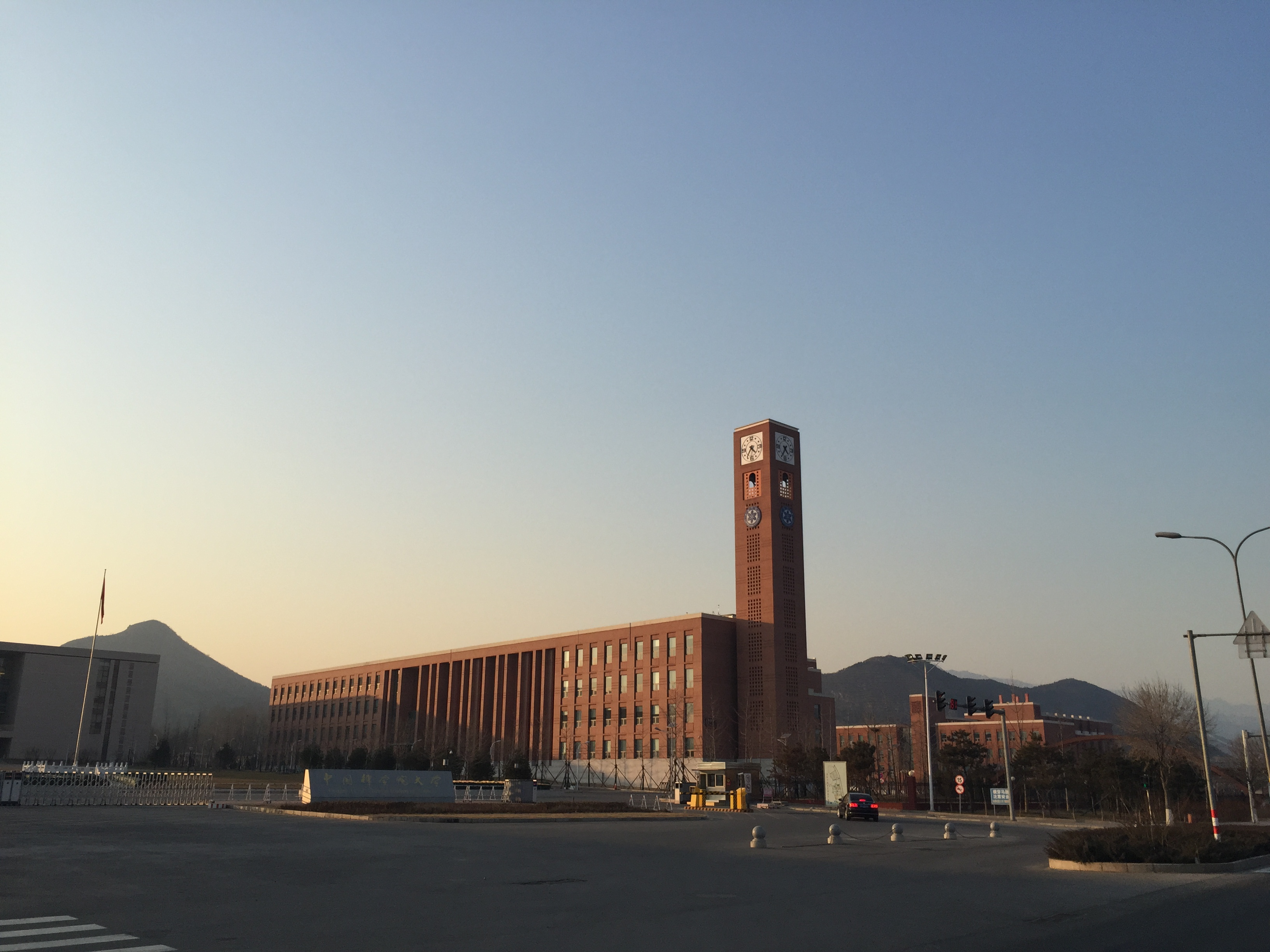
UCAS Yanqihu (雁栖湖) Campus in Huairou District, Beijing

The University of the Chinese Academy of Sciences (UCAS; 中国科学院大学) is a public university headquartered in Shijingshan, Beijing, China. It is owned by the Chinese Academy of Sciences. The university is part of the Double First-Class Construction.

UCAS also has colleges and schools nationwide co-existed and co-located with the CAS institutes, usually by adding extra nameplates to the institutes.

Established in 1978 as the Graduate School of the University of Science and Technology of China, the institution is the first graduate school in China. It produced the first doctoral graduate in science, the first doctoral graduate in engineering, the first female doctoral graduate, and the first graduate with dual doctorate in China. The USTC Graduate School (Beijing) was renamed as the Graduate School of the Chinese Academy of Sciences in 2000, and became an independent legal entity as the University of the Chinese Academy of Sciences in 2012. In 2014, UCAS began to recruit undergraduate students.

== History ==
In 1978, the Graduate School of the University of Science and Technology of China was founded in Beijing, as the first graduate school in China.

In 1986, the USTC Graduate School was renamed the University of Science and Technology of China Graduate School (Beijing), as USTC established another graduate school on its main campus in Hefei, Anhui.

In 2000, the USTC Graduate School (Beijing) was renamed the Graduate School of the Chinese Academy of Sciences.

In 2005, the university's official English name was changed to Graduate University of the Chinese Academy of Sciences (GUCAS).

In 2012, CAS Graduate School was renamed the University of the Chinese Academy of Sciences.

In 2014, UCAS began to recruit undergraduates.

On November 7, 2014, the University of Chinese Academy of Sciences officially participated in the activities of the C9 League, an alliance of elite Chinese universities offering comprehensive and leading education. However, it was not an official member.

UCAS operates its undergraduate and graduate programs on the university's Beijing campus. Moreover, the Chinese Academy of Sciences (CAS) assigns the authority of filing student status and issuing graduate degree for its affiliated institutes to the University of Science and Technology of China (USTC) and UCAS, and determines which university is responsible for which institute. Graduate students at most of CAS research institutes are assigned to have their student status registered at UCAS and are awarded UCAS degrees upon graduation. A small number of selected research institutes are assigned to have their graduate students register with USTC and awarded USTC degrees upon graduation. Students at CAS research institutes do not need to be physically present at the degree-issuing universities' campus to be awarded the degrees. UCAS mandates that graduate students at CAS institutes for which UCAS is responsible for issuing degrees must list their affiliation as "University of Chinese Academy of Sciences" in all their published work; failure to comply will result in their graduate degree applications not being considered.

== Academics ==
=== Academic organization ===
- School of Mathematical Sciences
- School of Physics
- School of Astronomy and Space Science
- College of Engineering Science
- School of Artificial Intelligence
- School of Chemistry and Chemical Engineering
- College of Materials Science and Opto-Electronic Technology
- College of Earth and Planetary Sciences
- College of Resources and Environment
- College of Life Sciences
- School of Medicine
- School of Computer Science and Technology
- School of Cyber Security
- School of Electronic, Electric and Communication Engineering
- School of Microelectronics
- School of Economics and Management
- School of Public Policy and Management
- College of Humanities and Social Sciences
- Department of Foreign Languages
- Sino-Danish College / Sino-Danish Center for Education and Research
- International College
- Kavli Institute for Theoretical Sciences
- Research Center on Fictitious Economy and Data Science
- CAS Key Laboratory of Big Data Mining and Knowledge Management
- CAS Key Laboratory of Computational Geodynamics
- Center of Architecture Research and Design
- Research Center for Innovation Method
- Training Center
- Tsung-Dao Lee Center of Sciences and Arts

=== Institutions ===
Founded in 1978, UCAS is the first graduate school in China with the ratification of the State Council. Backed by more than 110 institutes of the CAS, which are located at more than 20 cities all over the country, UCAS is headquartered in Beijing with 4 campuses, and 5 branches in Shanghai, Chengdu, Wuhan, Guangzhou and Lanzhou. From UCAS, graduated China's first doctoral student in science, first doctoral student in engineering, first female doctoral student and first student with double doctoral degrees in China. On the 20th anniversary of UCAS in 1998, Chinese President and General Secretary of the Communist Party Jiang Zemin of the People's Republic of China wrote this inscription for the University: "Revitalizing China through science and education, and emphasizing the cultivation and nurturing of talented people."

=== Rankings and reputation ===
University rankings

Global – Overall
- CWUR World: 41 (2026)
- CWTS World: 12 (2025)
- QS World: 360 (2027)
- THE Reputation: 61 (2023)
- USNWR Global: 53 (2026)

Regional – Overall
- QS Asia: 90 (2026)
- USNWR Asia: 9 (2025)

National – Overall
- CWUR National: 3 (2026)

UCAS is included in the Double First-Class University Plan designed by the central government of China. UCAS ranked #41 in CWUR World University Rankings 2026, placing it 3rd in China only after Tsinghua University and Peking University. UCAS is ranked 18th in NTU Rankings 2019, placing it 1st in China.

Regarding scientific research output, the Nature Index 2023 ranks UCAS the number one university in China and the Asia Pacific region, and second in the world among the global universities (after Harvard).

UCAS ranked 12th globally according to the CWTS Leiden Ranking 2025 based on the number of their scientific publications in the period 2020–2023.

As of 2025, UCAS is ranked 54th globally, 9th in Asia and 5th in China by the U.S. News & World Report Best Global University Ranking, with its "Artificial Intelligence", "Agricultural Science", "Biology and Biochemistry", "Biotechnology and Applied Microbiology", "Cell Biology", "Chemical Engineering", "Chemistry", "Civil Engineering", "Computer Science", "Condensed Matter Physics", "Electrical and Electronic Engineering", "Energy and Fuels", "Engineering", "Environment/Ecology", "Food Science and Technology", "Geoscience", "Material Science", "Mechanical Engineering", "Meteorology and Atmospheric Sciences", "Microbiology", "Molecular Biology and Genetics", "Nanoscience and Nanotechnology", "Optics", "Pharmacology and Toxicology", "Physical Chemistry", "Physics", "Plant and animal science", "Polymer Science" and "Water resource" subjects, placed in the global top 100.

Internationally, UCAS was regarded as one of the most reputable Chinese universities by the Times Higher Education World Reputation Rankings where, it ranked 61-70th globally.

UCAS faculty are all based upon the research professors in the Chinese Academy of Sciences, which has been consistently ranked the No. 1 research institute in the world by Nature Index since the list's inception in 2014, by Nature Research. This makes UCAS arguably the best graduate school in China and one of the best in the world.

Year	Rank	Valuer
2023	56	QS Asia University Rankings - Eastern Asia
2023	61-70	Times Higher Education World Reputation Rankings
2023	80	QS Asian University Rankings
2025	54	U.S. News & World Report Best Global University Ranking
2025	106	QS Asian University Rankings
2025	87	Top 100 Universities Ranked For Entrepreneurs - Graduate
2026	90	QS Asian University Rankings
2026	362	QS World University Rankings
2026	53	U.S. News & World Report Best Global University Ranking
2027	360	QS World University Rankings

==== Nature Index ====
Nature Index tracks the affiliations of high-quality scientific articles and presents research outputs by institution and country on monthly basis.

Year	Rank	Valuer
2021	1	Nature Index 2021 Young Universities (Leading 150 Young Universities)
2022	402	Nature Index 2022 - Leading 500 institutions by patent influence metric
2023	2	Nature Index - Academic Institutions - Global
2023	1	Nature Index - Academic Institutions - China
2024	2	Nature Index - Academic Institutions - Global
2024	1	Nature Index - Academic Institutions - China
2025	5	Nature Index - Academic Institutions - Global
2025	4	Nature Index - Academic Institutions - China
2026	8	Nature Index - Academic Institutions - Global
2026	7	Nature Index - Academic Institutions - China

==== Center for World University Rankings (CWUR) ====
Center for World University Rankings (CWUR) is a leading consulting organization providing policy advice, strategic insights, and consulting services to governments and universities to improve educational and research outcomes.

Year	Rank	Valuer
2025	46	CWUR World University Rankings
2026	41	CWUR World University Rankings

== Students ==
Even though UCAS mainly caters to graduate education, the university started enrolling undergraduate students in 2014. In 2015, there are 44,464 graduate students and 664 undergraduates students attend the academy.

UCAS, through its various departments and research institutes of the CAS across the country, offers the following programs to foreign students in a wide range of specialties and research fields: Master Program, PhD. Program, Program for Regular Visiting Students, and Program for Senior Visiting Students.

== Asteroid ==
Asteroid 189018 Guokeda was named in honor of the university. The official naming citation was published by the Minor Planet Center on 25 September 2018 (M.P.C. 111803).

== Global partner institutions ==
=== Europe ===
==== Denmark ====
- Sino-Danish Center for Education and Research
- Technical University of Denmark
- University of Copenhagen
- Aarhus University
- Aalborg University
- University of Southern Denmark
- Roskilde University
- IT University of Copenhagen
- Copenhagen Business School

==== Italy ====
- POLIMI Graduate School of Management

==== Netherlands ====
- University of Groningen

=== North America ===
==== Canada ====
- University of Toronto

==== United States ====
- Tulane University

=== Asia ===
==== Hong Kong ====
- City University of Hong Kong
- Hong Kong Polytechnic University

==== Malaysia ====
- Universiti Tunku Abdul Rahman

== See also ==
- University of Science and Technology of China
- ShanghaiTech University
- University of Chinese Academy of Social Sciences
- Science and technology in China
- List of universities and colleges in Beijing
- List of universities in China
