= Capital University of Economics and Business =

Municipal public in Beijing, China

- 首都经济贸易大学
- Motto: 崇德尚能 经世济民 chóng dé shàng néng jīng shì jì mín
- Motto in English: "Advocate morality, value competence, strategize national development, and serve the people"
- Type: Public
- Established: 1995; 31 years ago
- Affiliations: BHUA
- President: Fu Zhifeng
- Faculty: 750
- Administrative staff: 1459
- Students: 20,436
- Undergraduates: 9,528
- Postgraduates: 2,310
- Doctoral students: 170
- Other students: 8,598
- Location: Fengtai, Beijing, China; 39.841257°N 116.310594°E
- Colours: Red
- Website: english.cueb.edu.cn

Chinese name
- Simplified Chinese: 首都经济贸易大学
- Traditional Chinese: 首都經濟貿易大學
Transcriptions
Standard Mandarin
- Hanyu Pinyin: Shǒudū Jīngjì Màoyì Dàxué

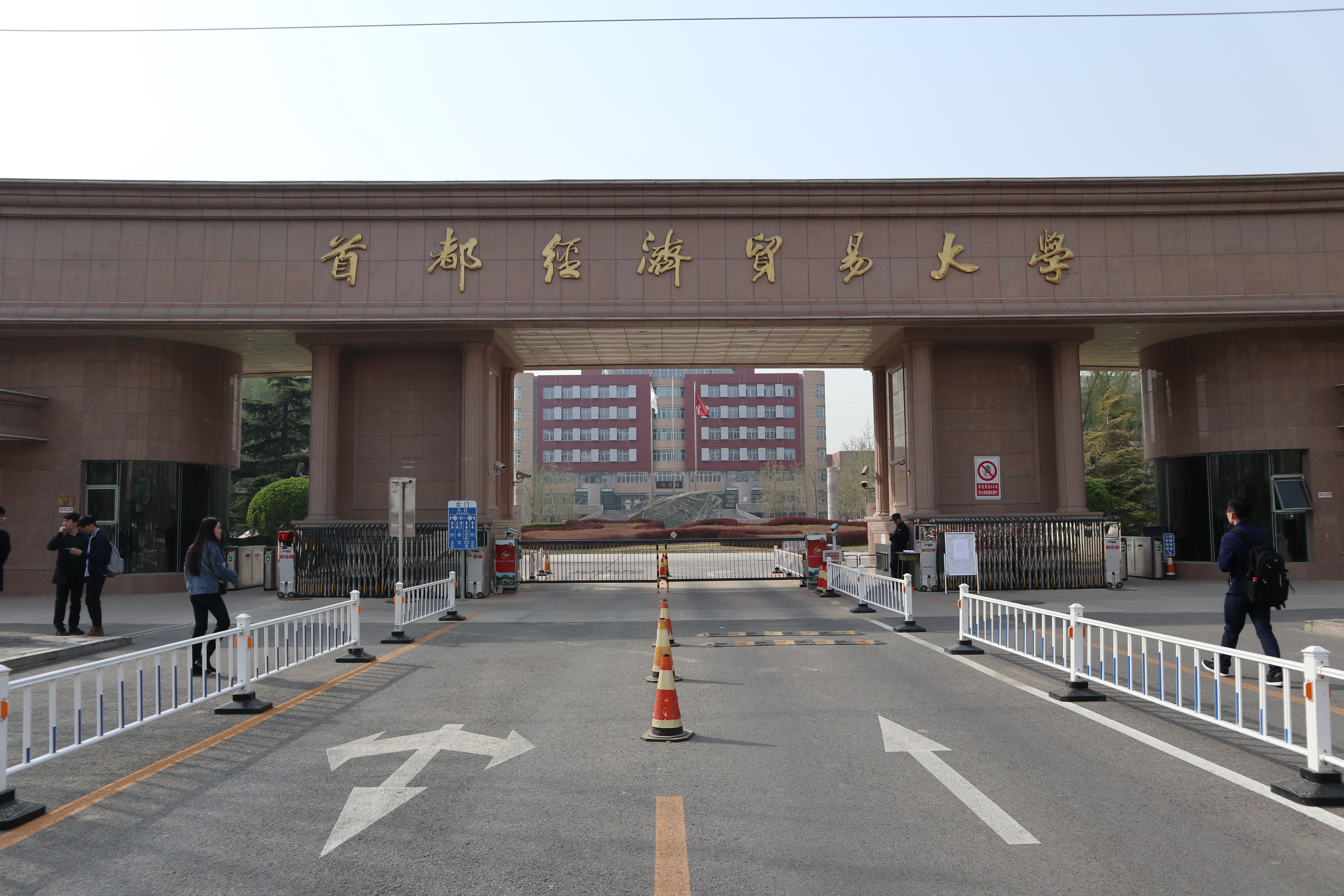
Gate of CUEB main campus in Huaxiang, Beijing

The Capital University of Economics and Business (CUEB; 首都经济贸易大学) is a municipal public university in Fengtai, Beijing, China. It is affiliated with and funded by the Beijing Municipal People's Government.

In March 1995, Capital University of Economics and Business was established through the merger of then Beijing Economics College (北京经济学院) and then Beijing Finance and Business College (北京财贸学院).
