= Ikuko Shimizu =

Japanese educator (1892–1964)

- 清水郁子
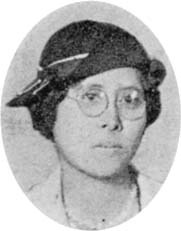
- Education: Oberlin College; University of Michigan

Ikuko Shimizu (Japanese: 清水郁子; 2 October 1892 – 24 June 1964) was a Japanese Christian feminist and educator.

== Early life and education ==
Ikuko Koizumi was born on 2 October 1892 in Matsue, Shimane Prefecture.

Shimizu graduated from Oberlin College in 1927 with a bachelor’s degree in divinity and earned a master’s degree in education from the University of Michigan the following year.
