= University of Chinese Academy of Social Sciences =

University in Beijing, China

- 中国社会科学院大学
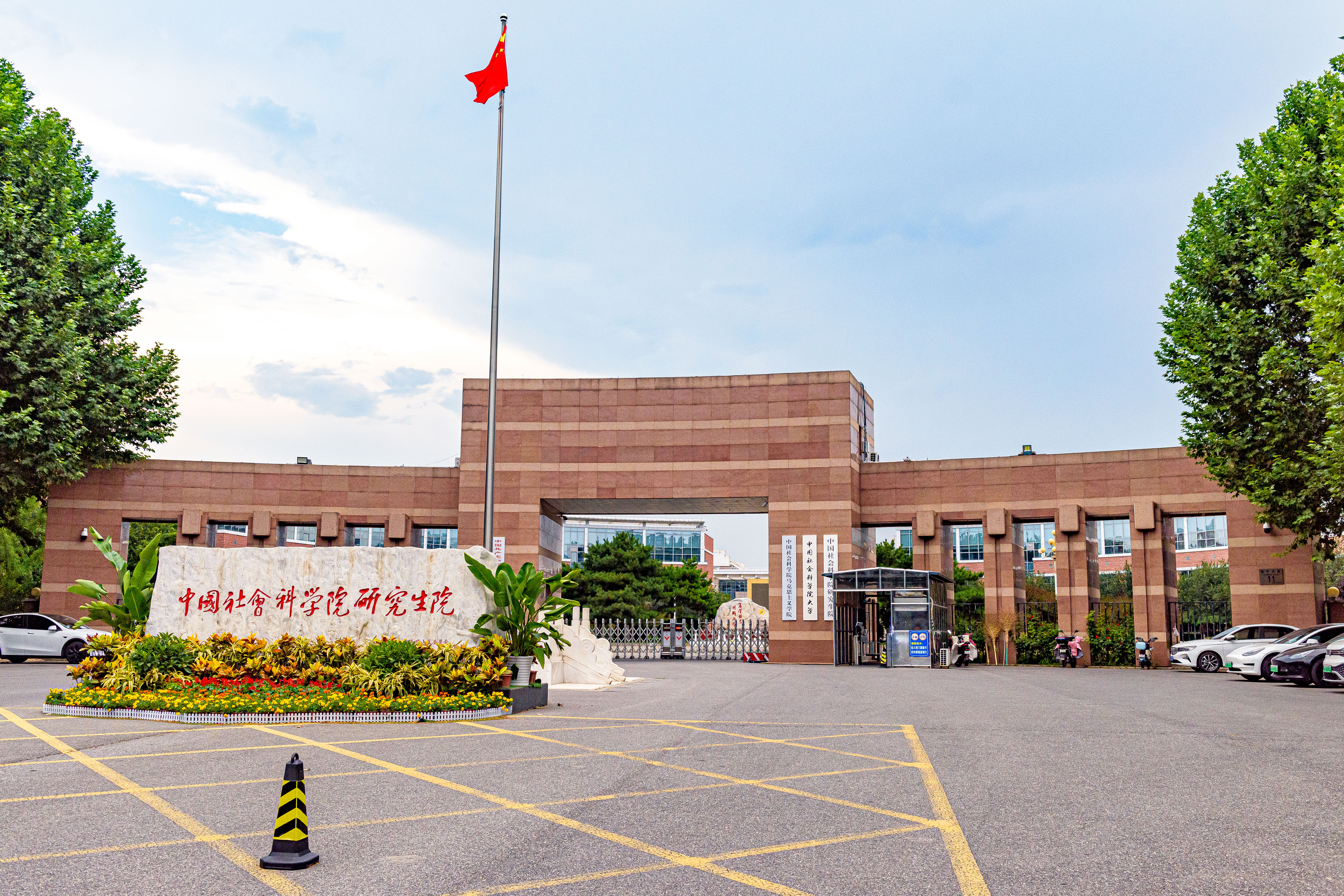
- Motto: 笃学、慎思、明辨、尚行
- Type: Public university
- Established: 1978; 48 years ago
- Affiliations: Chinese Academy of Social Sciences
- President: Zhang Zhengwen
- Faculty: 2,092 (2020)
- Students: 7,091 (2020)
- Undergraduates: 2,282 (2020)
- Postgraduates: 4,757 (2020)
- Location: Beijing, China; 39°44′20″N 116°10′27″E
- Campus: Beijing
- Colours: Red
- Website: ucass.edu.cn

Chinese name
- Simplified Chinese: 中国社会科学院大学
- Traditional Chinese: 中國社會科學院大學
Transcriptions
Standard Mandarin
- Hanyu Pinyin: Zhōngguó Shèhuì Kēxuéyuàn Dàxué

Shekeda
- Simplified Chinese: 社科大
- Traditional Chinese: 社科大
Transcriptions
Standard Mandarin
- Hanyu Pinyin: Shèkēdà

The University of Chinese Academy of Social Sciences (UCASS; 中国社会科学院大学) is a public university headquartered in Beijing, China. It is affiliated with the Chinese Academy of Social Sciences. The university was formed based on the Graduate School of the Chinese Academy of Social Sciences, integrating undergraduate and part of the graduate education programs from China Youth University of Political Studies.

== Gallery ==
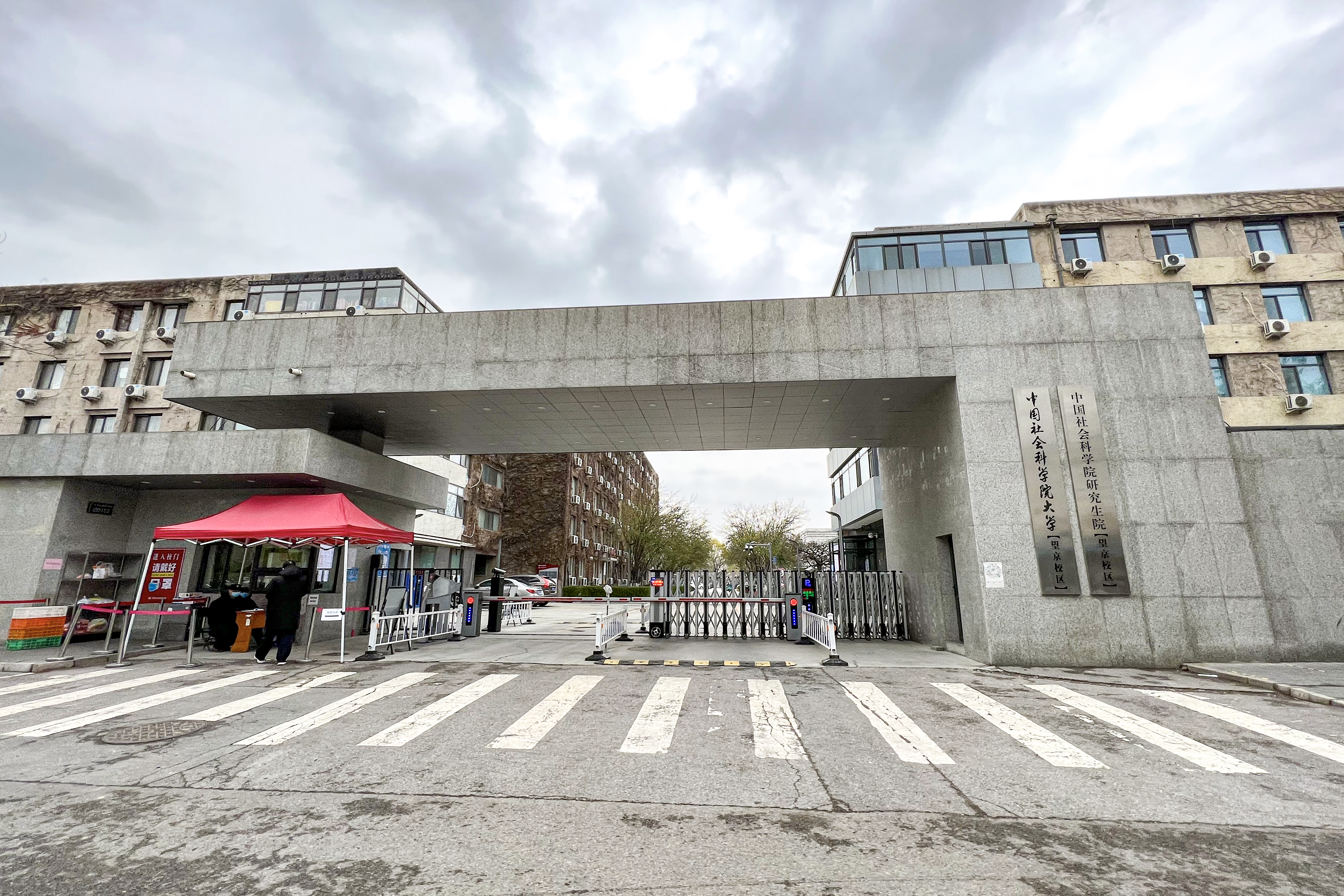
Wangjing Campus

== See also ==
- Graduate School of Chinese Academy of Social Sciences
- Chinese Academy of Social Sciences
- Shanghai Academy of Social Sciences
- Chinese Academy of Sciences
- University of the Chinese Academy of Sciences
- University of Science and Technology of China
