= Beijing Electronic Science and Technology Institute =

Public college in Fengtai, Beijing, China

Coordinates: 39.8368°N 116.2804°E

- 北京电子科技学院
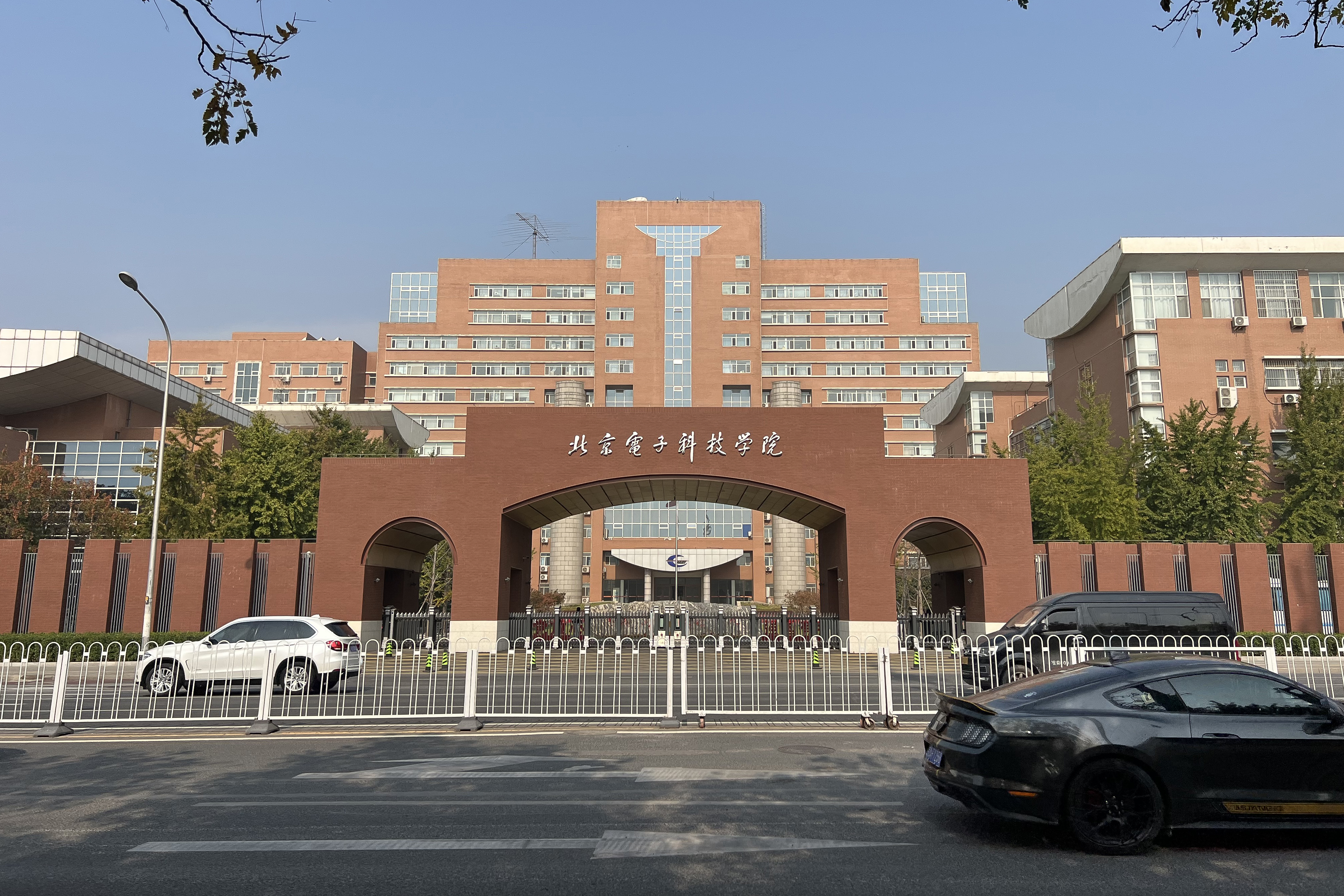
- Motto: 忠诚、笃学、严谨、守纪
- Type: Public college
- Established: 1947; 79 years ago
- President: Mao Ming
- Faculty: 252 (2020)
- Students: 2,114 (2020)
- Undergraduates: 1,740 (2020)
- Postgraduates: 374 (2020)
- Location: Beijing, China
- Campus: Beijing
- Colours: Blue Red White
- Website: www.besti.edu.cn

Chinese name
- Simplified Chinese: 北京电子科技学院
- Traditional Chinese: 北京電子科技學院
Transcriptions
Standard Mandarin
- Hanyu Pinyin: Běijīng Diànzǐ Kējì Xuéyuàn

Guokeda
- Simplified Chinese: 电科院
- Traditional Chinese: 電科院
Transcriptions
Standard Mandarin
- Hanyu Pinyin: Diànkēyuàn

Beijing Electronic Science and Technology Institute, or BEIST, is located at No. 7 Fufeng Road, Fengtai District, Beijing. It is a general institution of higher learning that trains professional and technical personnel in information security and office automation for party and government agencies. It is affiliated with the General Office of the Chinese Communist Party. The college is a major research institute of information security in China. It consists of five departments.

== History ==
=== Beijing Electronic Science and Technology Institute ===
The predecessor of Beijing Electronic Science and Technology Institute was the Youth Training Class of the Central Working Committee, which was established in Xibaipo, Pingshan County, Hebei Province in August 1947. In 1949, it was merged into the Engineering School of the People's Revolutionary Military Commission of the Central People's Government in Zhangjiakou. In June 1952, some departments were separated again and merged with the East China Military Region in Nanjing and the Third Field Army Youth Cadre School (established in March 1950) to form the Central People's Government People's Revolutionary Military Commission Confidential Cadre School (Nanjing Confidential Cadre School), which was under the jurisdiction of the Central People's Government People's Revolutionary Military Commission.Later it was changed to the Central People's Government Committee Confidential Cadre School. In December 1954, it was changed to the First Confidential School of the Chinese People's Liberation Army. In May 1955, it was changed to the First Confidential School of the State Council and was incorporated into the State Council. Later, the school moved to Beijing and was referred to as Beijing Jixue School. After that, it moved to Xuanhua, Hebei and was referred to as Xuanhua Jixue School.

In 1981, with the approval of the State Council, Beijing Electronic College was established in Xiaotangshan, Beijing.In the second half of 1983, the school moved to Banbidian, Beijing, and officially began to recruit college students. In 1992, with the approval of the State Education Commission, Beijing University of Posts and Telecommunications was established on the basis of Beijing Electronic College. It began to recruit undergraduate students and added correspondence education. In 1993, the General Office of the CCP Central Committee decided to merge Zhongnanhai Amateur University into Beijing University of Electronic Science and Technology. In February 1999, the college moved to the new campus in Fengtai, located in the Fengtai Park of Zhongguancun Science Park.

Since the establishment of the school, Mao Zedong, Deng Xiaoping, Jiang Zemin, Hu Jintao, Xi Jinping and other top leaders have written inscriptions. Among them, Jiang Zemin, General Secretary of the CCP Central Committee, also wrote the name of the school. Qiao Shi, Wen Jiabao, Zeng Qinghong, Wang Gang, Li Zhanshu and other party and state leaders have given instructions for the development of the school and visited the school.

=== Zhongnanhai Amateur University ===
In the spring of 1948, Mao Zedong, Chairman of the Chinese Communist Party, established the Central Government Amateur School in Xibaipo, Pingshan County, Hebei Province. The central leadership at that time made a special study on this and decided that Liu Shaoqi, one of the five secretaries of the Secretariat of the Chinese Communist Party, would serve as the principal concurrently. Liu Huo from the Propaganda and Education Section would be in charge of the specific teaching work. The courses included political theory and cultural courses such as Chinese and mathematics. There were no full-time teachers, and cadres with high cultural and theoretical levels were hired to teach.

In 1949, the Central Committee of the Chinese Communist Party moved into Zhongnanhai in Beijing. The school's teaching work was handed over to the Central Guard Bureau, which used the scattered and unused old bungalows in Zhongnanhai as classrooms and called it the Zhongnanhai Cultural School. After the founding of the People's Republic of China, the number of units in Zhongnanhai increased, and the educational levels of the staff varied, so many courses and classes needed to be opened. The leaders transferred more than ten young people with university and college degrees from the graduates of the North China People's Revolutionary University to teach. In 1953, there were more than 900 students. The principal was Wang Jingxian, secretary of the Party Branch of Mao Zedong's Office and deputy director of the Central Security Bureau. The vice principal was Ma Da, chief of the Propaganda and Education Section of the Security Bureau. At that time, the school offered junior high school and elementary school cultural courses, plus crash courses in literacy, a total of 26 classes. Because the CCP Central Committee Directly Affiliated Organs Committee stipulated that all staff members who did not have a high school education must study at the school, all central directly affiliated organs working in Zhongnanhai, such as the General Office of the CCP Central Committee, the CCP Central Military Commission, the CCP Central Publicity Department, the Security Bureau, the Secretariat, the Confidential Office, and other units, had staff members enrolled, with the Security Bureau having the largest number of staff members. The State Council and its system working in Zhongnanhai also had a large-scale part-time school, but the teaching location was not in Zhongnanhai.

By the end of the 1950s, half of the students in the school had reached the level of junior high school graduates and needed to go to high school. At this time, the school's courses were reduced and the number of students dropped to more than 400. At that time, the Central Military Commission of the CCP and the CCP Publicity Department moved out of Zhongnanhai, and the staff of other agencies in Zhongnanhai were reduced due to three rectification and reorganizations in 1955, 1957 and 1959. The principal, Wang Jingxian, was often on business trips with Mao Zedong and had no time to take care of school affairs. The vice principal, Ma Da, had been transferred to Xinjiang for work. The director, deputy director and many teaching staff left one after another. There were only five teachers left, and they were unable to run a high school.

In early 1960, after Mao Zedong learned of the above situation, he instructed the leaders of the Security Bureau to run a truly comprehensive middle school: (1) It is necessary to attach importance to and do a good job in amateur cultural education, and have Wang Dongxing, the director, serve as the principal; (2) The number of teachers should be increased, and the amateur school should be run as a complete middle school. Like ordinary middle schools, ten courses should be offered: literature, history, geography, mathematics, physics, chemistry, biology, physiology and hygiene, foreign languages, and politics. Foreign language courses must be offered, and history courses should be taught more; (3) After the middle school courses are completed, an amateur university should be run; (4) He himself would serve as the honorary principal and personally review and approve the annual teaching plan and summary. He also sent his secretary Hu Qiaomu to the school to study the teaching methods of classical literature with the teachers. At that time, the school had moved from the Siheyuan opposite Huairen Hall to Zhengshi Hall on the South China Sea, very close to Mao Zedong's residence.

In order to implement Mao Zedong's instructions, four teachers were transferred to the agency to add three high school courses, and two part-time teachers were hired to open a university history class (taught by a teacher from Peking University) and a general English class (taught by Sun Shoumin, a cadre from the Security Bureau Office).

The Cultural Revolution impacted the cultural and educational work of Zhongnanhai, and the school was closed. After the 3rd Plenary Session of the 11th Central Committee of the Chinese Communist Party in 1978, Hu Yaobang initiated the restoration of the school. In 1981, the Zhongnanhai Cultural Tutorial School was officially established to provide high school courses for those who had not graduated from high school. In 1983, Zhongnanhai Amateur University was established, with a secretarial department and other subjects. On the eve of the graduation ceremony of the first batch of students in 1985, Hu Yaobang wrote the name of the school for the school.

In 1988, Zhongnanhai Amateur University participated in the establishment of Capital United Workers University.In 1993, the school became independent from the Capital United Workers University and was restored as the Zhongnanhai Amateur University.In 1993, the General Office of the CCP Central Committee decided to merge Zhongnanhai Amateur University into Beijing Institute of Electronic Science and Technology. In 2007, Zhongnanhai Amateur University was given a red card warning by the Ministry of Education and was not allowed to enroll students. As of September 30, 2021, according to the Ministry of Education website, Zhongnanhai Amateur University is still on the list of adult higher education institutions.

== Research ==
=== Scientific research platform ===
As of October 2019, the school has 2 teaching and research departments and 1 information security research institute. In March 2021, the Department of Electronics and Communication Engineering has built 3 electronic information engineering professional laboratories.

Department	Name	Notes
Department of Humanities and Social Sciences, Beijing Electronic Science and Technology Institute	Humanities Education Research Center	
Department of Ideological and Political Theory Teaching and Research, Beijing Electronic Science and Technology Institute	Ideological and Political Theory Teaching and Research Center	
Information Security Research Department, Beijing Electronic Science and Technology Institute	Information Security Research Institute	
Department of Electronics and Communications Engineering	Electronic Engineering Laboratory Analog Electronics Technology Laboratory Digital Electronics Technology Laboratory	

=== Academic Journals ===
==== Beijing Electronic Science and Technology Institute Journal ====
Beijing Electronic Science and Technology Institute Journal is a comprehensive academic journal sponsored by the university and approved by the National Press and Publication Administration. Focused on cybersecurity research, the journal publishes the institution's scientific and educational achievements. It aims to provide a platform for academic exchange and uphold high publishing standards, with the goal of becoming a leading journal in the field.

The editorial management system includes an Editorial Board, responsible for overseeing editorial policies, and an Editorial Department, which handles the day-to-day publishing tasks. Key positions such as the Executive Editor and Section Editors ensure the journal maintains academic rigor and publishing quality. The review process involves multiple stages, including peer review and editorial checks, to guarantee the accuracy and scholarly value of all submissions.

Additionally, the journal organizes an annual award for outstanding papers, promoting high-quality contributions to the field. It is financially managed under the university's oversight and follows strict administrative guidelines to ensure efficient and transparent operations.

== Successive leaders ==
=== Beijing Electronic Science and Technology Institute ===
==== Current leaders (as of October 2023) ====
- Secretary of the Party Committee of the academy: Xu Tao
- Vice President: Qiao Xiaoli
- Vice President: Xiao Song
- Secretary of the Discipline Inspection Commission: Song Yang
- Vice President: Xie Sijiang
- Deputy Secretary of the Party Committee: Yao Siyuan

=== Zhongnanhai Amateur University ===
==== Honorary President ====
- Mao Zedong (1960-?)

==== Principal ====
- Liu Shaoqi (1948-?, President of the Amateur School of the Central Organs)
- Wang Jingxian (?-1960, President of the Zhongnanhai Organs Cultural School, deputy director of the Central Security Bureau)
- Wang Dongxing (1960-?, President of the Zhongnanhai Organs Cultural School, Director of the Central Security Bureau)
- Feng Wenbin (1981–1982, President of the Zhongnanhai Cultural Tutorial School, First Deputy Director of the General Office of the CCP Central Committee)
- Xu Ruixin (1987–1993, President of Zhongnanhai Amateur University, deputy director of the General Office of the CCP Central Committee)
