= Beijing No.80 High School =

- 北京市第八十中学
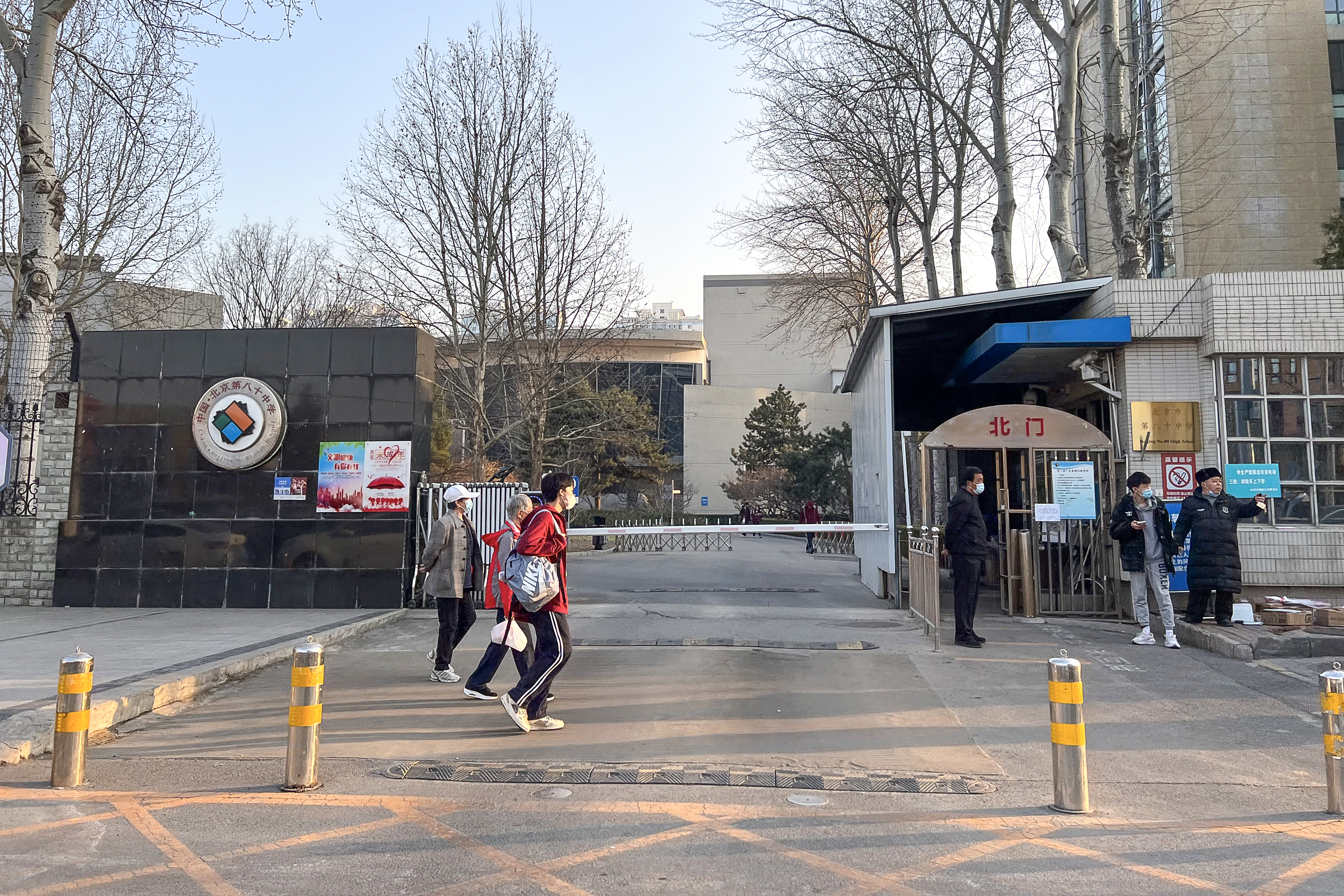
- Wangjing campus

Location
- A16 Wangjing Beilu (senior division); 2 Baijiazhuang Xili (junior division); Chaoyang District, Beijing; 40.0088°N 116.4697°E

Information
- Website: bj80.com

The Beijing No.80 High School (北京市第八十中学) is a public secondary school in Chaoyang, Beijing, China. The school is supervised by the Beijing City Chaoyang District Education Committee.
