= China Women's University =

Women's university in Beijing, China

Coordinates: 39.99355°N 116.42905°E

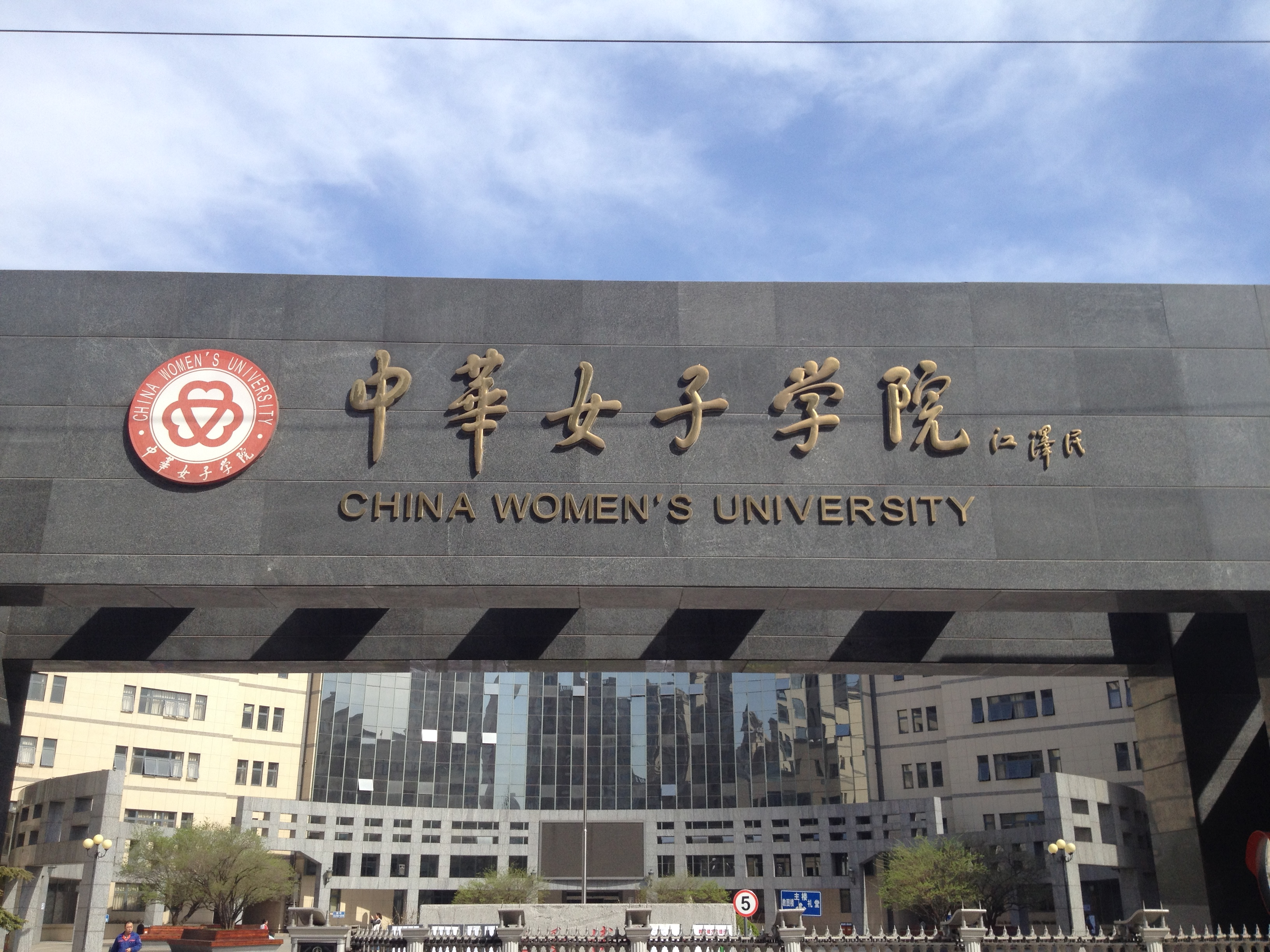
China Women's University

China Women's University (simplified Chinese: 中华女子学院; traditional Chinese: 中華女子學院; pinyin: Zhōnghuá Nǚzǐ Xuéyuàn) is a women's university located in Chaoyang District of Beijing, China. It also has a campus in Changping District of Beijing.

It was founded in 1949 as a school for the cadres of All-China Women's Federation. The current name was adopted in 1995 and in 1996 it became a university. Currently it has about 160 teachers and 3,300 undergraduate students.

It used to have a branch campus in Shandong Province, which became Shandong Women's University in 2010.
