= Lists of schools in Beijing =

The following are lists of schools in Beijing.

== By district ==
- List of schools in Changping District
- List of schools in Chaoyang District
- List of schools in Daxing District
- List of schools in Dongcheng District
- List of schools in Fangshan District
- List of schools in Fengtai District
- List of schools in Haidian District
- List of schools in Huairou District
- List of schools in Mentougou District
- List of schools in Miyun District
- List of schools in Pinggu District
- List of schools in Shijingshan District
- List of schools in Shunyi District
- List of schools in Tongzhou District
- List of schools in Xicheng District
- List of schools in Yanqing District

== Gallery ==
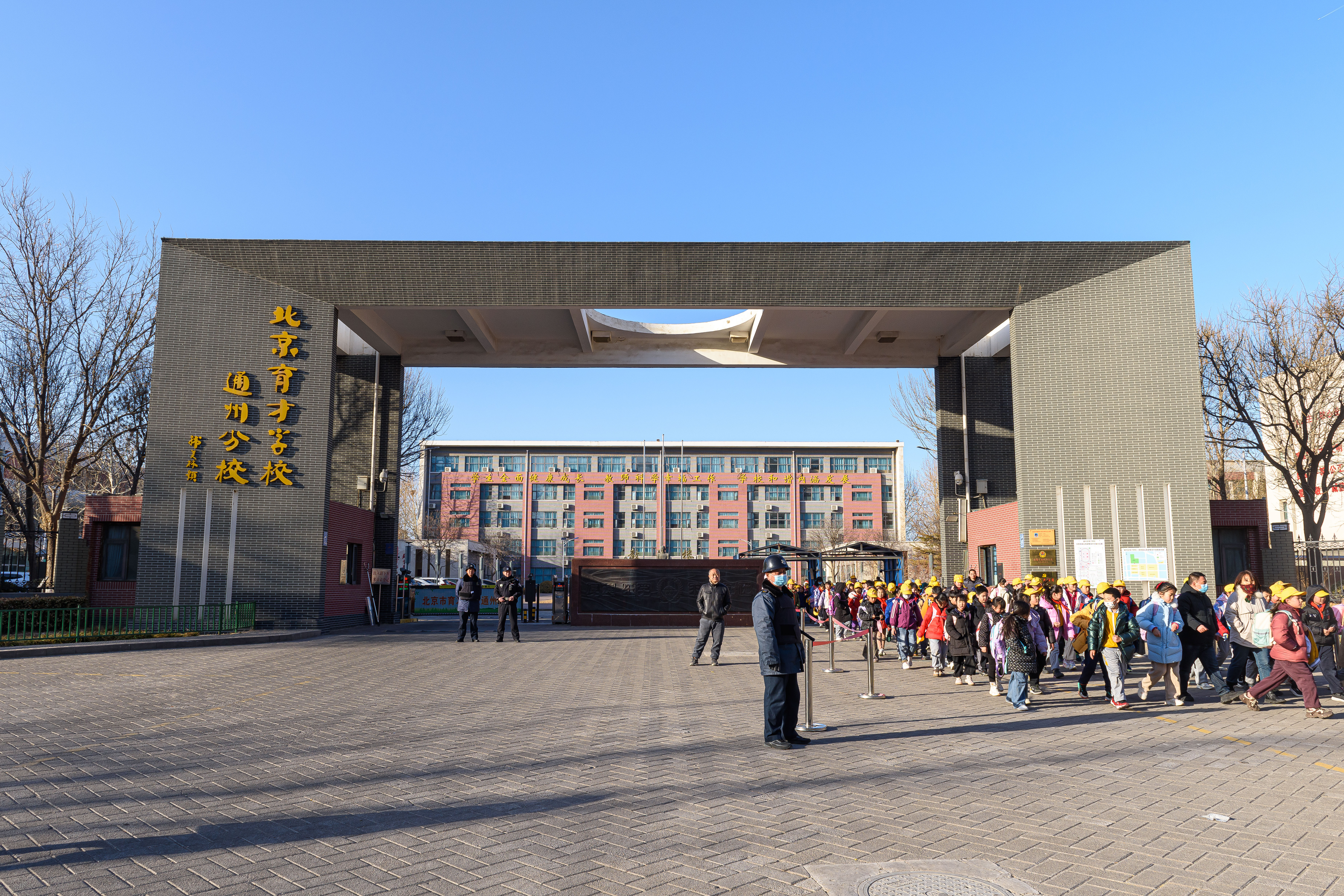
Beijing Yucai School Tongzhou Branch

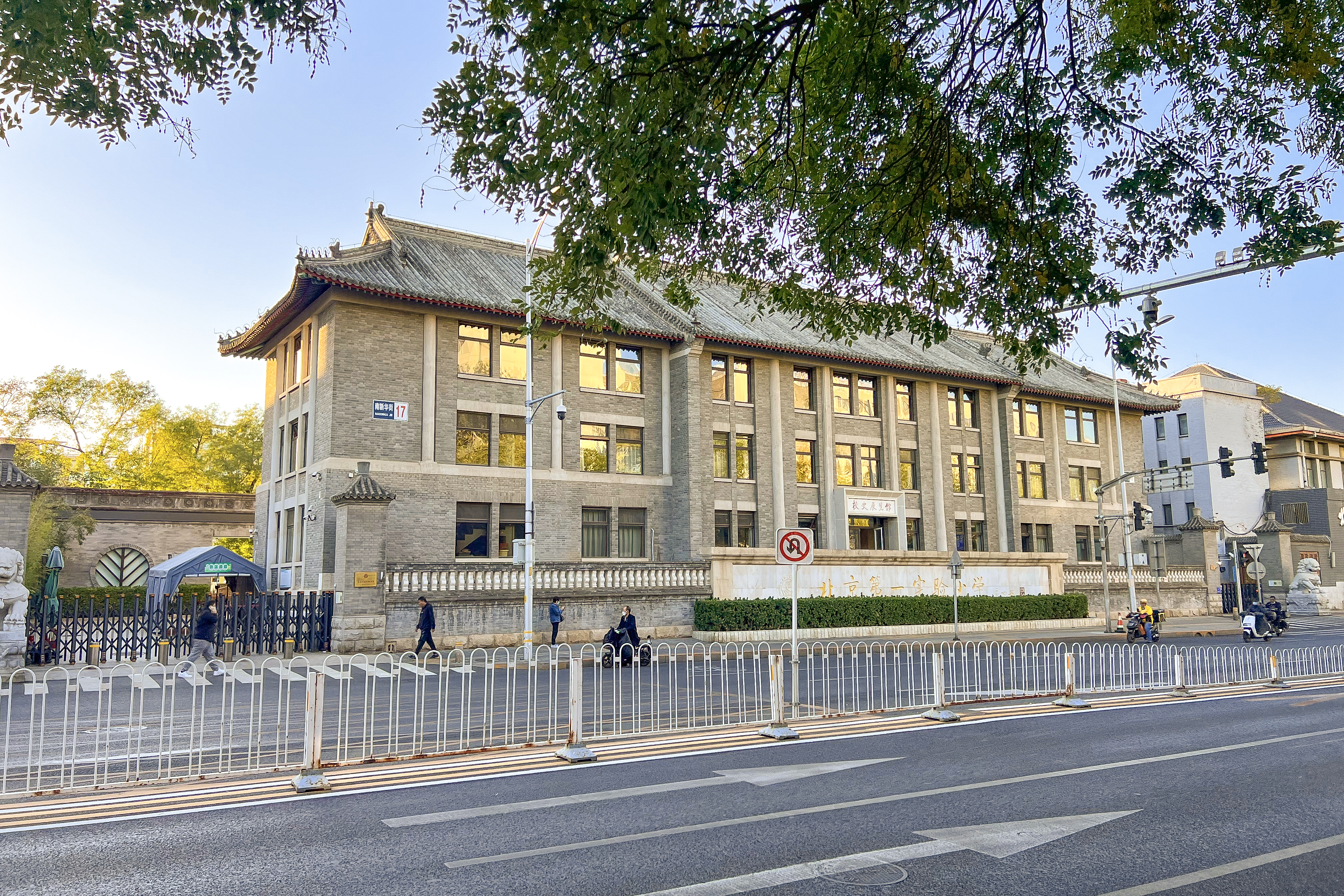
Beijing First Experimental Primary School, main campus

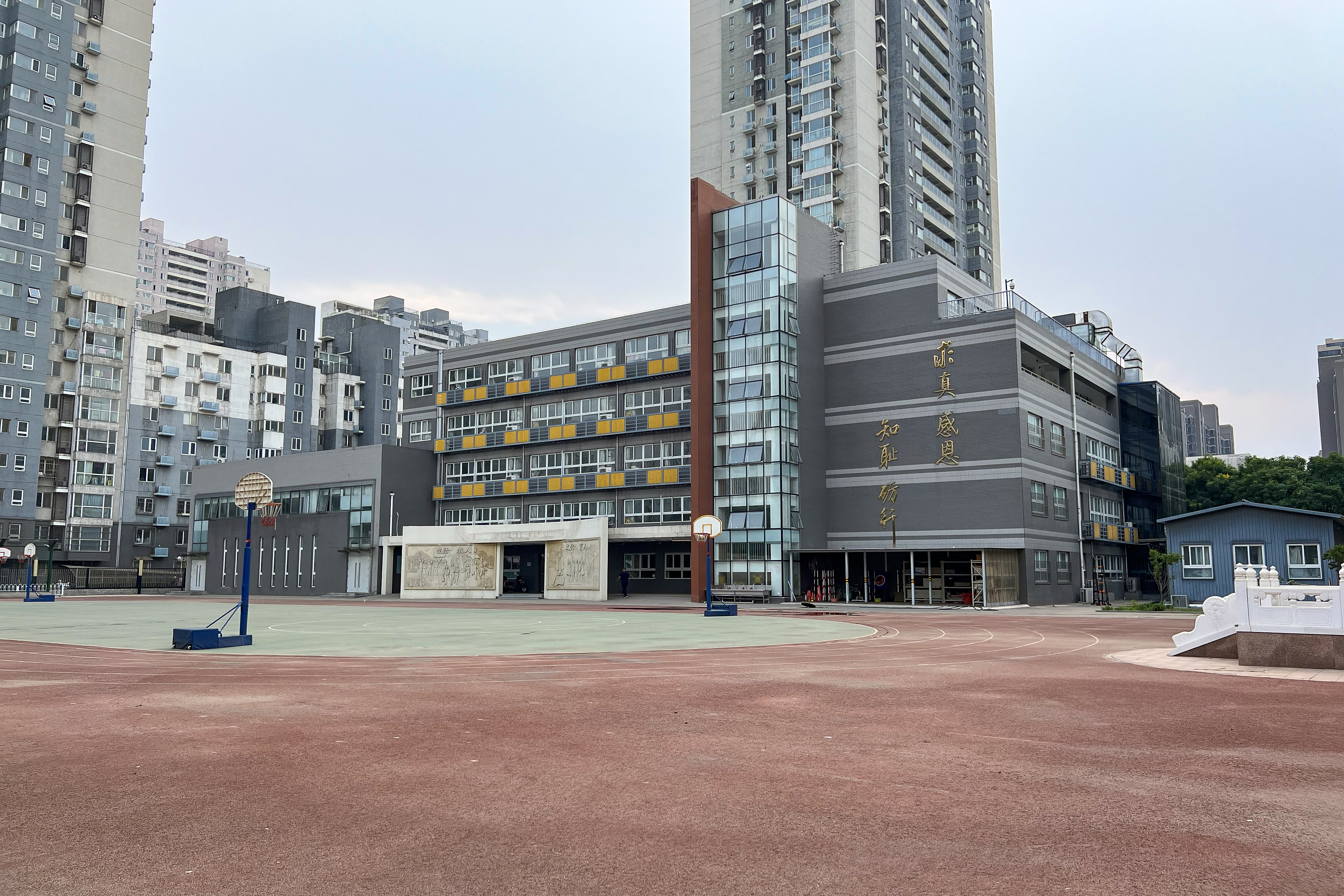
Beijing First Experimental Primary School, Guangwai Campus

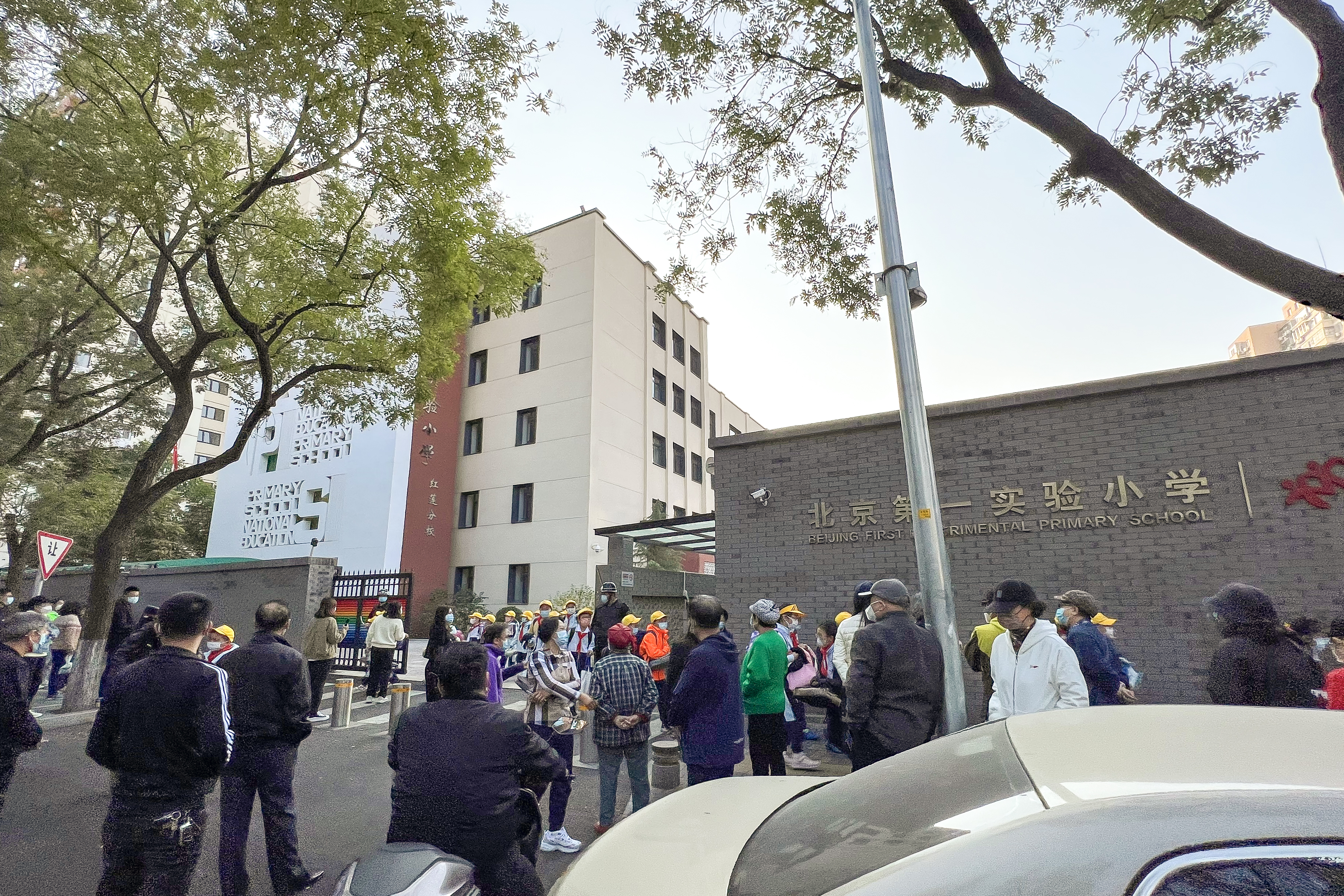
Beijing First Experimental Primary School, Honglian branch

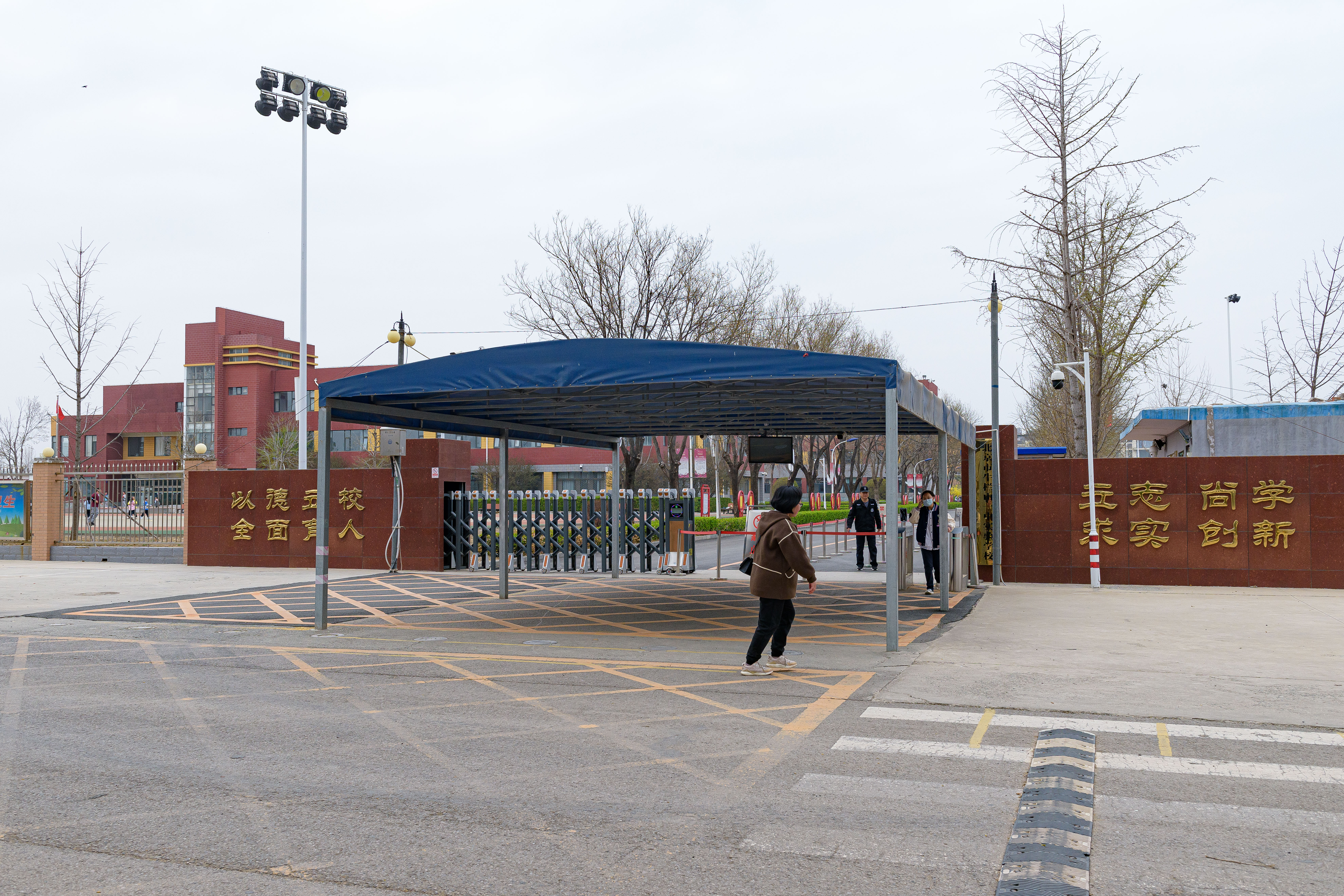
Beijing First Experimental Primary School, Hufangqiao Campus

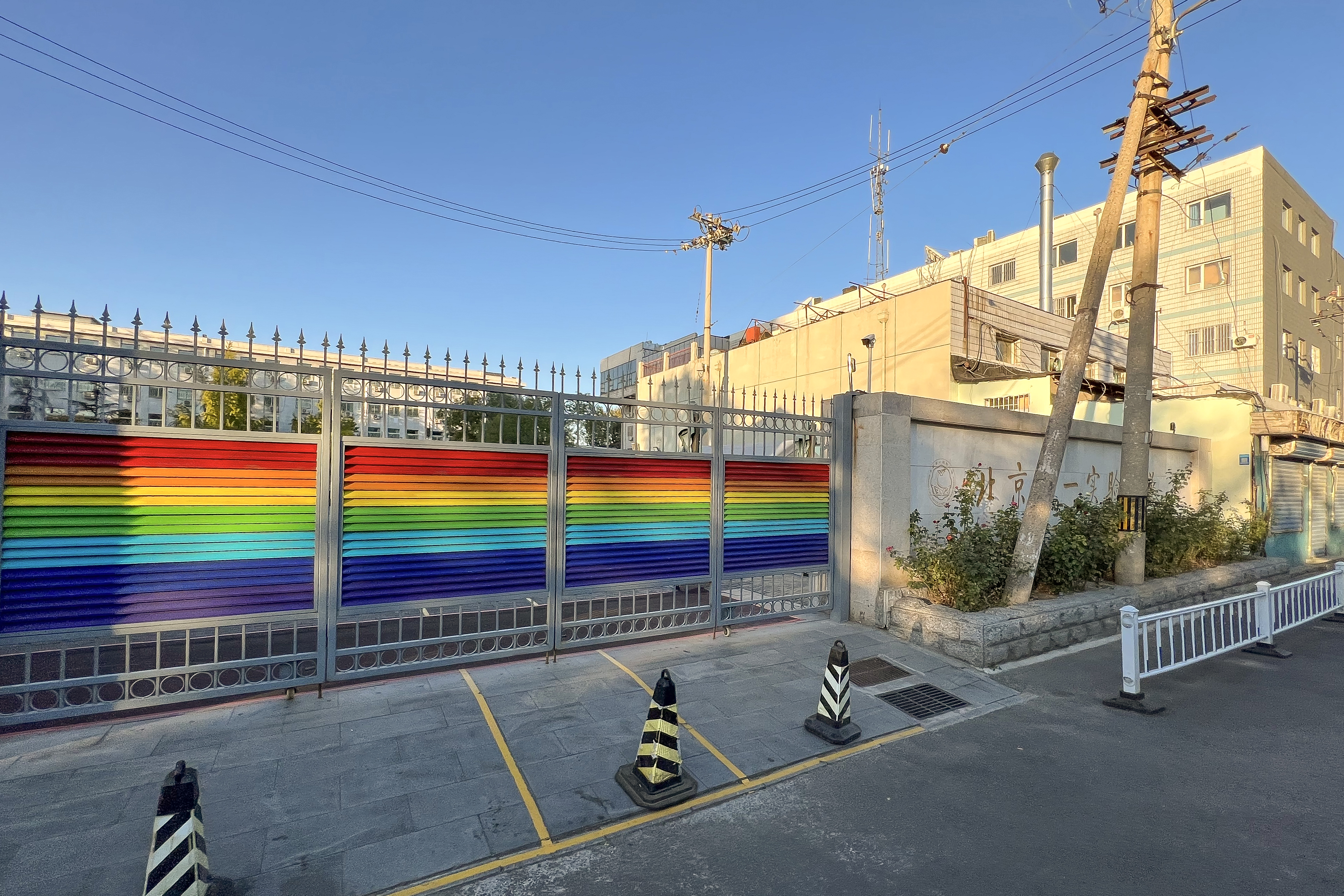
Beijing First Experimental Primary School, Hufangqiao Campus

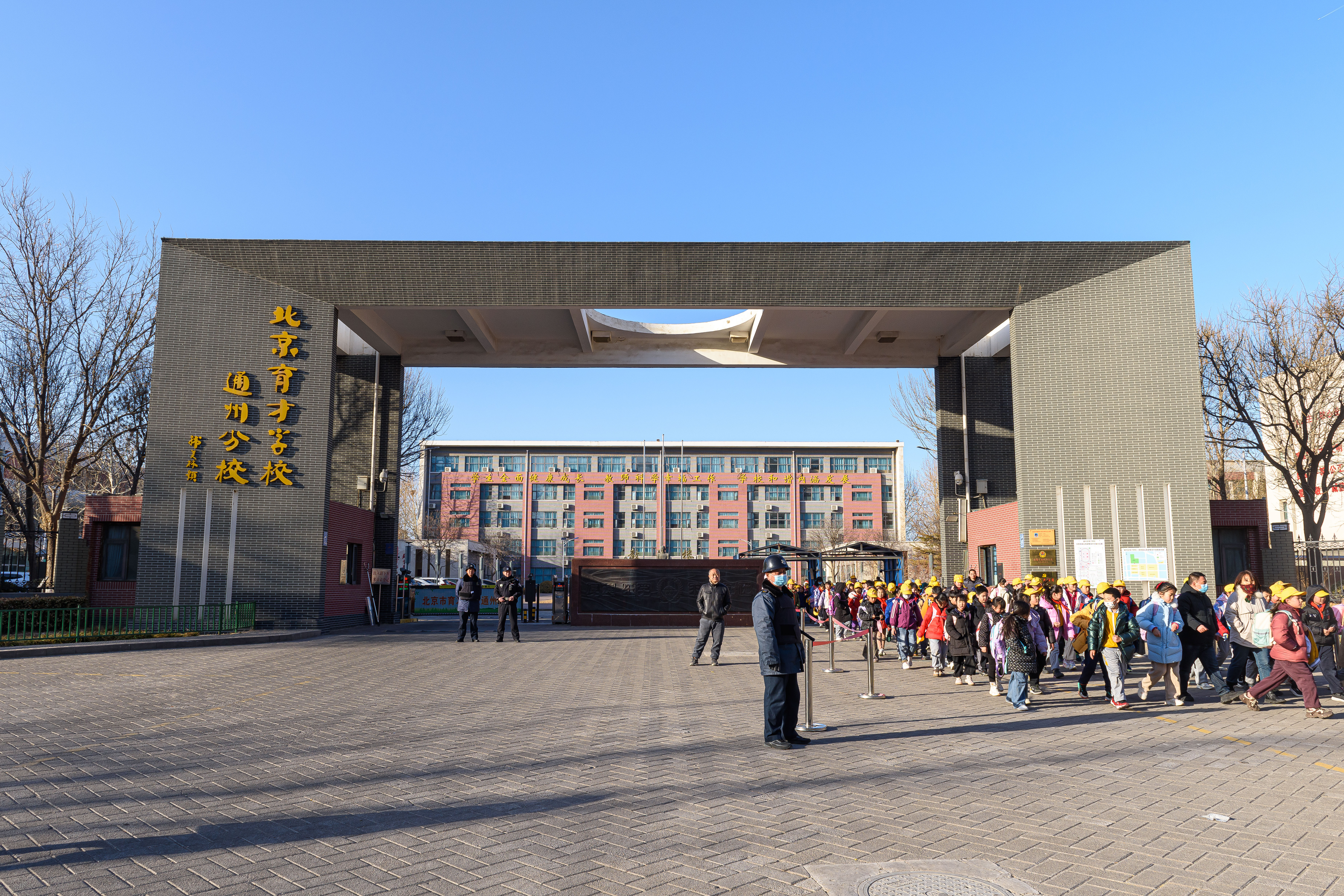
Beijing Yucai School Tongzhou Branch

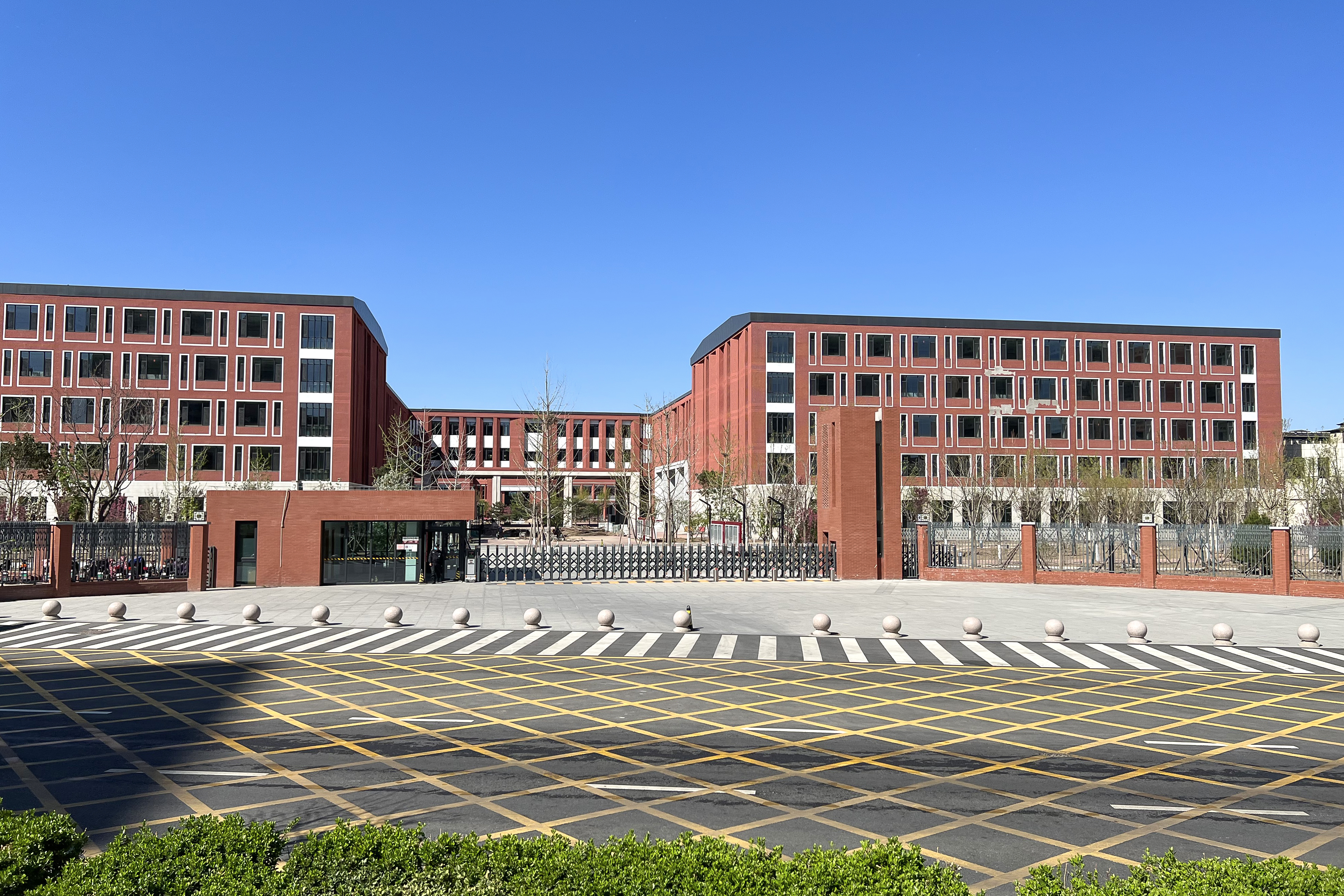
Beijing School

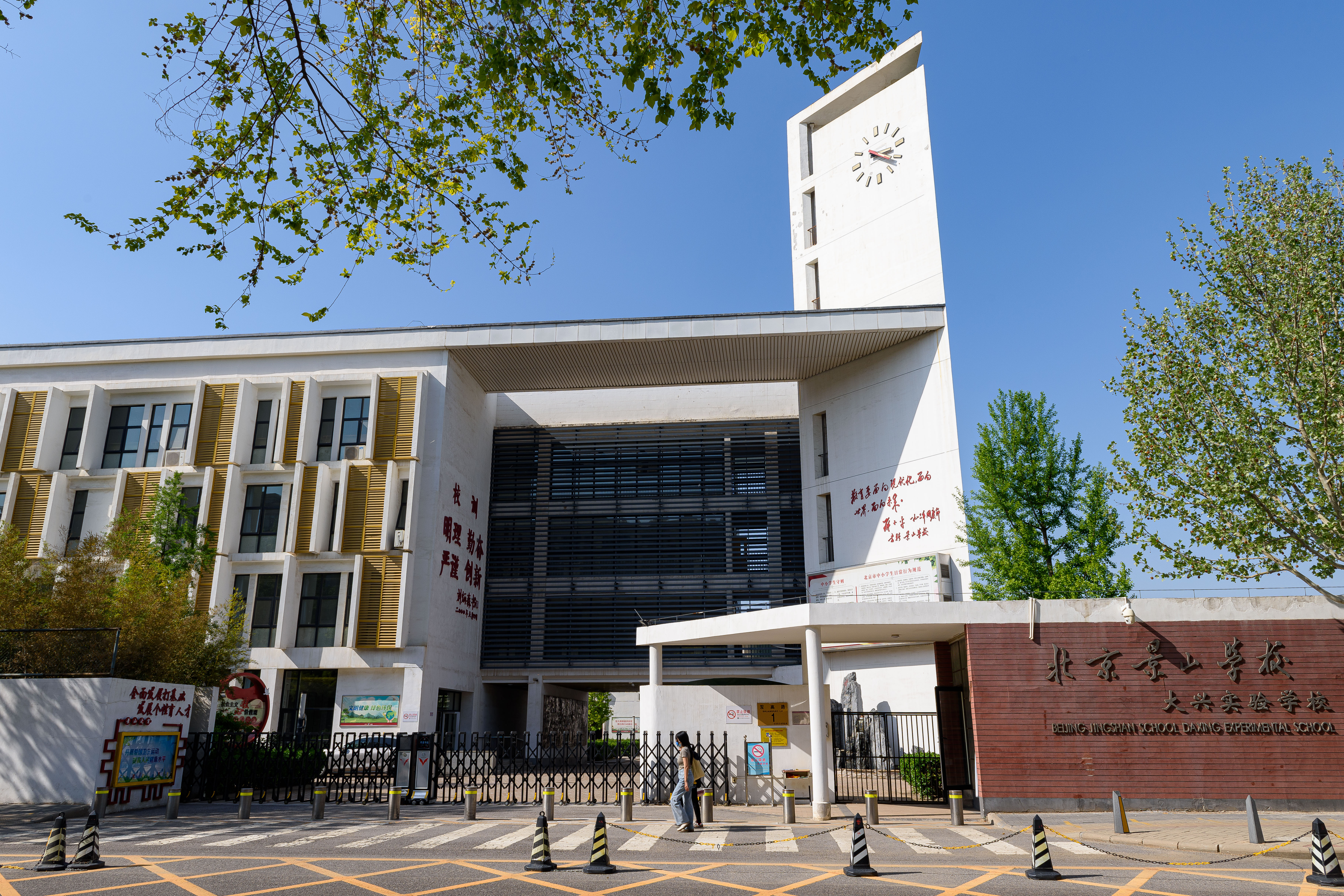
Beijing Jingshan School Daxing Experimental School

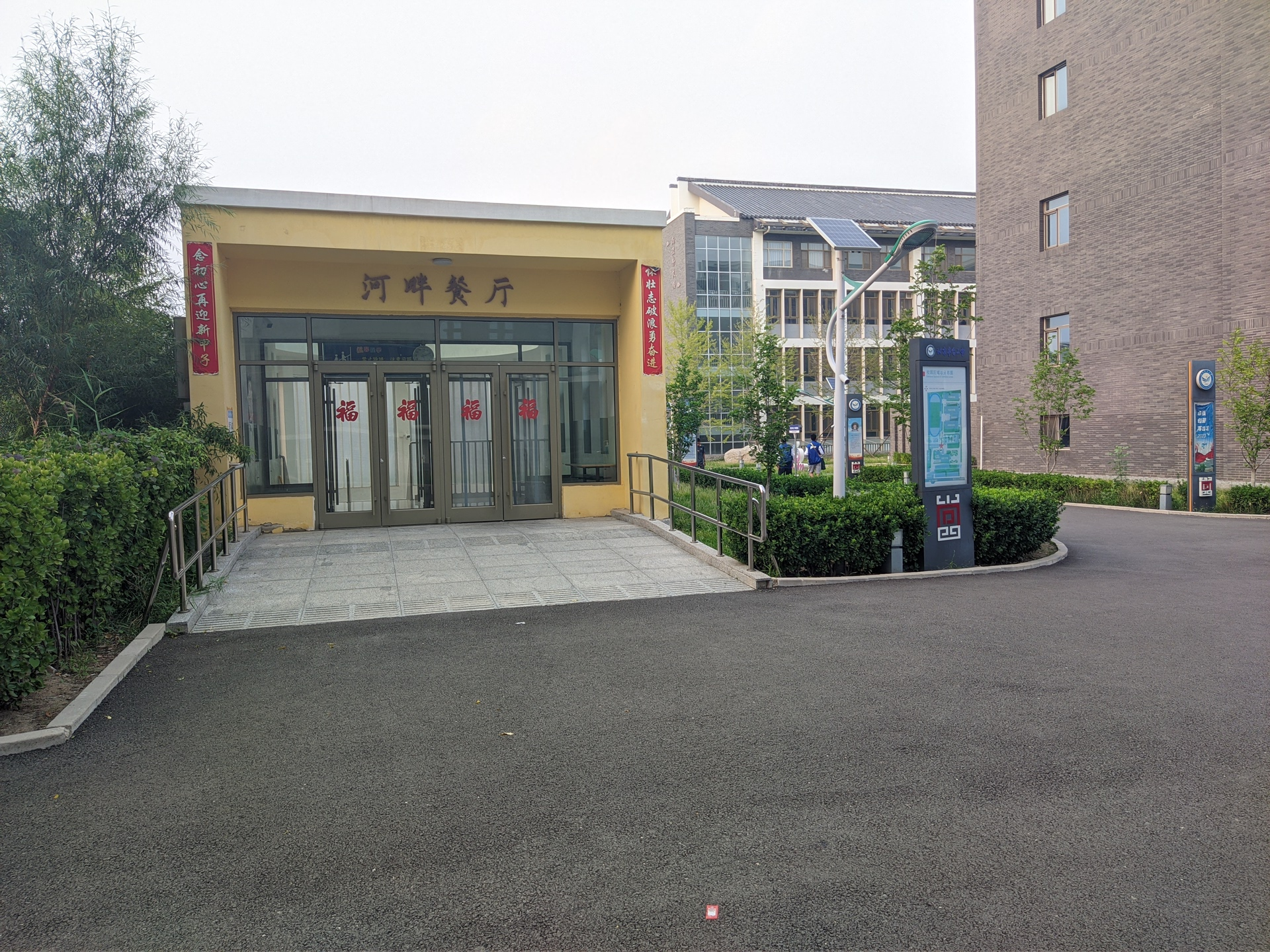
Beijing Fengtai No.2 High School Riverside

== By type ==
- List of international schools in Beijing

== See also ==
- Education in Beijing
- Beijing Municipal Commission of Education
