= Ye Peida =

President of the Beijing Institute of Posts and Telecommunications
- In office 1980s

Personal details
- Born: 18 October 1915 Xinchang, Shanghai, Republic of China
- Died: 16 January 2011 (aged 95) Beijing, People's Republic of China
- Education: Peiyang University
- Profession: Telecommunications engineer, academic

Ye Peida (Chinese: 叶培大; Wade–Giles: Yeh P'ei-ta; 18 October 1915 – 16 January 2011) was a Chinese telecommunications engineer and educator. He was a founding professor of the Beijing Institute of Posts and Telecommunications in 1955 and served as its president in the 1980s. He was an academician of the Chinese Academy of Sciences and a Life Fellow of the Institute of Electrical and Electronics Engineers (IEEE). He was awarded the Ho Leung Ho Lee Prize for Technological Sciences and the Third Millennium Medal of IEEE.

== Early life and education ==
Ye was born on 18 October 1915 in Xinchang, Nanhui, Shanghai, Republic of China. He studied telecommunications in the Department of Electrical Engineering of Peiyang University (now Tianjin University). In his senior year, the Second Sino-Japanese War broke out in 1937 and Tianjin fell to Japanese occupation. Peiyang University evacuated to Xi'an in inland China and its students and faculty became war refugees. Ye graduated from the university in 1938.

In 1940, Ye worked as a technician at the Central Broadcasting Station in Chongqing, China's wartime capital. Under the constant threat of Japanese bombing raids, he mostly worked in underground bomb shelters.

In 1945, Ye passed the examination for a government scholarship for studying in the United States with the highest score. He spent the following year studying at the graduate school of Columbia University, and interned at NBC and Nortel.

== Career ==
After returning to China in 1947, Ye worked as an engineer at the Central Broadcasting Station, which had moved back to Nanjing after the end of World War II, and also taught as an associated professor at the University of Nanking.

When the Kuomintang government lost the Chinese Civil War and retreated to Taiwan in 1949, Ye decided to stay in mainland China. In 1950, Ye was designated by Li Qiang to help establish the Central People's Broadcasting Station in Beijing. He was appointed a professor at his alma mater Peiyang University, and was promoted in 1952 to Chair of the Department of Telecommunications of the school, by then renamed as Tianjin University.

When the Beijing Institute of Posts and Telecommunications (BIPT) was established in 1955, Ye became a founding professor and Chair of the Department of Radio. After the outbreak of the Cultural Revolution in 1966, he was banished to a May Seventh Cadre School to perform manual labour. He was not fully rehabilitated until after 1978.

In the 1980s, Ye served as President of BIPT. In April 1985, he published an article in the official journal Red Flag advocating the modernization of China's telecommunications industry. In 1988, Ye and fellow academician Zhang Xu published a report that advised the breakup of the monopoly that the Ministry of Posts and Communications held in China's telecommunications industry. It was highly controversial at the time and many thought it would threaten Ye's career, as the BIPT was directly controlled by the ministry. However, the Chinese government adopted their proposal and created shareholding companies to operate the country's telecommunications networks.

With the support of Wang Daheng, Ma Dayou and other academicians, Ye successfully lobbied the national government to include telecommunications in the 863 Program, which funded the development of China's high-tech industries. Ye served as a member of the Chinese People's Political Consultative Conference (CPPCC) from 1965 until 1993.

Ye died on 16 January 2011 in Beijing, at the age of 95.

== Scientific contributions ==
Ye oversaw the design and installation of China's first 100-kilowatt broadcast transmitter and its largest rhombic antenna network. He was the first Chinese scientist to research microwave communication in 1956, and later created China's first phase rectifier and direct coupling filter for microwave waveguide. In 1964, he pioneered the research of free-space optical communication in China. After 1978, he focussed on the research of fiber-optic communication and made a series of significant discoveries that reduced noise and interference in fiber-optic transmission. He published more than 400 papers and five monographs.

Ye was a pioneering educator of telecommunications in China. Over a career spanning more than 60 years, he taught more than 5,000 students and advised over 70 doctoral and master's students. Two of his books were widely used as textbooks in Chinese universities.

== Honours and recognition ==
In 1980, Ye was elected an academician of the Chinese Academy of Sciences. He was elected an IEEE Fellow in 1988 and an Outstanding Fellow in 1997. In 2000, he became an IEEE Life Fellow and was awarded the Third Millennium Medal of IEEE. He was elected Governor of the International Council for Computer Communications (ICCC) in 1993.

Ye received numerous national and ministerial prizes for his research, as well as the Ho Leung Ho Lee Prize for Technological Sciences. He received an IEEE citation for "pioneering contribution to telecommunications engineering education in China" and an ICCC citation for "contributions made to international computer communication".
