= List of schools in Shijingshan, Beijing =

This is a list of schools in Shijingshan District, Beijing.

== Secondary schools ==
Note: In China the word 中学 zhōngxué, literally translated as "middle school", refers to any secondary school and differs from the American usage of the term "middle school" to mean specifically a lower secondary school or junior high school. 初中 chūzhōng is used to refer to a lower secondary school.

- Beijing Gucheng School (北京市古城中学) - East (东) and West (西) campuses
- Beijing Jingshan School Yuanxiang Branch School (北京景山学校远洋分校)
- Beijing City Jingyuan School (北京市京源学校) - Main School and Lianshuhu Branch School (莲石湖分校)
- Beijing City Lantian No. 1 School (北京市蓝天第一学校)
- Beijing City No. 9 High School (北京市第九中学) - Main School and Branch School (分校)
- Beijing Education Science Research Institute Affiliated Shijingshan Experimental School (北京教育科学研究院附属石景山实验学校) - North Campus (北校区) and South Campus (南校区)
- Beijing City Gaojing High School (北京市高井中学)
- Beijing City Jiahui High School (北京佳汇中学)
- Beijing City Liwen High School (北京市礼文中学)
- Beijing City Tongwen High School (北京市同文中学)
- Beijing City Shijingshan District Hua-Ao School (北京市石景山区华奥学校)
- Beijing City Shijingshan District Huangzhuang School (北京市石景山区黄庄学校)
- Beijing City Shijingshan District Taijing School (北京市石景山区台京学校)
- Beijing City Shijingshan District Zhongshan School (北京市石景山区中杉学校)
- Beijing City Shijingshan District Experimental High School (北京市石景山区实验中学) - Main School, East Campus (东校区). and Branch School (分校)
- Beijing City Shijingshan District Shijingshan High School (北京市石景山区石景山中学)
- High School Affiliated to Beijing Normal University West Beijing Branch School (北京师范大学附属中学京西分校)
- Capital Normal University Affiliated Pingguoyuan High School (首都师范大学附属苹果园中学) - Main School and Branch School (分校)
- North China University of Technology Affiliated High School (北方工业大学附属学校) - Junior High School Division (中学部)
- Affiliated High School of Peking University Shijingshan School (北京大学附属中学石景山学校)
- Shougang Mining Company Workers' Children School (首钢矿业公司职工子弟学校)
