= List of schools in Daxing, Beijing =

This is a list of schools in Daxing District, Beijing. Education inequality and access to quality education is increasingly becoming a societal issue in Beijing.

== Secondary schools ==
Note: In China the word 中学 zhōngxué, literally translated as "middle school", refers to any secondary school and differs from the American usage of the term "middle school" to mean specifically a lower secondary school or junior high school. 初中 chūzhōng is used to refer to a lower secondary school.

- Beijing No. 2 High School (北京市第二中学) Yizhuang School (亦庄学校) - North Campus (北校区) and South Campus (南校区)
- Beijing No. 8 High School Daxing Branch School (大兴分校) and Yizhuang Branch School (亦庄分校)
- Beijing No. 14 High School (北京市第十四中学) Daxing Anding Branch School (大兴安定分校)
- Beijing Jingshan School Daxing Experimental School (北京景山学校大兴实验学校)
- Beijing Normal University Daxing Affiliated High School (北京师范大学大兴附属中学) - East Campus (东校区)
- Beijing Yinzhuang Experimental School (北京亦庄实验中学)
- Beijing City Daxing District Jinhai School (北京市大兴区金海学校)
- Beijing City Daxing District Xinghai School (北京市大兴区兴海学校)
- Beijing City Daxing District Yonghua Experimental School (北京市大兴区永华实验学校)
- Beijing City Daxing District No. 1 High School (北京市大兴区第一中学) - Main Campus, and North Campus (北校区)
- Beijing City Daxing District No. 3 High School (北京市大兴区第三中学)
- Beijing City Daxing District No. 4 High School (北京大兴区第四中学)
- Beijing City Daxing District No. 6 High School (北京市大兴区第六中学)
- Beijing City Daxing District No. 7 High School (北京市大兴区第七中学) - East Campus (东校区) and West Campus (西校区)
- Beijing City Daxing District Caiyu High School (北京市大兴区采育中学)
- Beijing City Daxing District Daxinzhuang High School (北京市大兴区大辛庄中学)
- Beijing City Daxing District Demao High School (北京市大兴区德茂中学)
- Beijing City Daxing District Dingfuzhuang High School (北京市大兴区定福庄中学)
- Beijing City Daxing District Fashang High School (北京市大兴区垡上中学)
- Beijing City Daxing District Fengheying High School (北京市大兴区凤河营中学)
- Beijing City Daxing District Guojiawu High School (北京市大兴区郭家务中学)
- Beijing City Daxing District Hongxing High School (北京市大兴区红星中学)
- Beijing City Daxing District Jiugong High School (北京市大兴区旧宫中学)
- Daxing District Langfa High School (大兴区狼垡中学)
- Beijing City Daxing District Lixian Ethnic High School (北京市大兴区礼贤民族中学)
- Beijing City Daxing District Panggezhuang High School (北京市大兴区庞各庄中学)
- Beijing City Daxing District Qingyundian High School (北京市大兴区青云店中学)
- Beijing City Daxing District Suncun High School (北京市大兴区孙村中学)
- Beijing City Daxing District Taihe High School (北京市大兴区太和中学)
- Beijing City Daxing District Weishanzhuang High School (北京市大兴区魏善庄中学)
- Beijing City Daxing District Xinghua High School (北京市大兴区兴华中学) - Main Campus and Yangshan Campus (仰山校区)
- Beijing City Daxing District Yufa High School (北京市大兴区榆垡中学)
- Beijing City Daxing District Zhangziying High School (北京市大兴区长子营中学)
- Beijing Normal University Daxing Affiliated High School (北京师范大学大兴附属中学)
- Beijing University of Civil Engineering and Architecture Affiliated High School (北京建筑大学附属中学) - Main Campus and New Campus (新校区)
- Capital Normal University High School (首都师范大学附属中学) - Daxing North Campus (大兴北校区) and Daxing South Campus (大兴南校区) - Affiliated with Capital Normal University
- Capital Normal University Daxing Affiliated High School (首都师范大学大兴附属中学)
- National Academy of Education Administration Affiliated Experimental School (国家教育行政学院附属实验学校)
