= List of schools in Dongcheng, Beijing =

This is a list of schools in Dongcheng District, Beijing.

== Secondary schools ==
Note: In China the word 中学 zhōngxué, literally translated as "middle school", refers to any secondary school and differs from the American usage of the term "middle school" to mean specifically a lower secondary school or junior high school. 初中 chūzhōng is used to refer to a lower secondary school.

- Beijing Huiwen Middle School (formerly known in English as Peking Academy)
- Beijing Huiwen Experimental School - 125 High School (北京汇文实验中学（125中学）)
- Beijing Jingshan School - Main Campus and Dengshikou Campus (灯市口校区)
- Beijing City No. 2 School Branch School (北京市第二中学分校)
- Beijing No. 1 Middle School (北京市第一中学)
- Beijing No. 2 Middle School (北京市第二中学)
- Beijing No. 5 High School
- Beijing No. 5 High School Branch School (北京市第五中学分校) - Dianmen Campus (地安门校区) and Gulou Campus (鼓楼校区)
- Beijing No. 11 High School (北京市第十一中学) - Main school and branch school (分校)
- Beijing No. 11 High School Experimental School (北京市第十一中学实验学校)
- Beijing City No. 21 High School (北京市第二十一中学)
- Beijing City No. 22 High School (北京市第二十二中学) - Andingmen Campus (安定门校区) and Jiaodaokou Campus (交道口校区)
- Beijing City No. 24 High School (北京市第二十四中学)
- Beijing No. 25 Middle School
- Beijing City No. 27 High School (北京市第二十七中学)
- Beijing No. 50 High School (北京市第五十中学) - Main School and Branch School (分校)
- Beijing City No. 54 High School (北京市第五十四中学) - Main School and Branch School (分校)
- Beijing City No. 55 High School (北京市第五十五中学)
- Beijing City No. 65 High School (北京市第六十五中学)
- Beijing City No. 96 High School (北京市第九十六中学) - Main campus and South Campus (南校区)
- Beijing City No. 109 High School (北京市第一零九中学)
- Beijing City No. 115 High School (北京市第一一五中学)
- Beijing City No. 142 High School (北京市第一四二中学) - Beijing Hongzhi High School (北京宏志中学)
- Beijing City No. 165 High School (北京市第一六五中学)
- Beijing City No. 166 High School - Dengshikou Campus (灯市口校区) and Dongsiliutiao Campus (东四六条校区)
- Beijing City No. 171 High School (北京市第一七一中学) - East Campus (东校区) and West Campus (西校区)
- Beijing City Chongwenmen High School (北京市崇文门中学)
- Beijing City Dongzhimen High School (北京市东直门中学) - In Dongzhimen
- Beijing City Guangqumen High School (北京市广渠门中学) - Main Campus and South Campus (南校区)
- Beijing City Heping Road School (北京市和平北路学校) - Beijing City Dongcheng Sports School (北京市东城体育学校)
- Beijing City Guozijian High School (北京市国子监中学)
- Beijing City Longtan High School (北京市龙潭中学)
- Beijing City Qianmen Foreign Language School (北京市前门外国语学校)
- Beijing City Wenhui High School (北京市文汇中学)
- Central Academy of Arts & Design Affiliated High School (中央工艺美术学院附属中学) - Beijing City International Arts Campus (北京市国际美术学校)
- Dongcheng District Peizhi Zhongxin School (东城区培智中心学校)
- Beijing City Dongcheng District Special Education School (北京市东城区特殊教育学校)

== Primary schools ==
- Beijing City No. 5 High School Affiliated Fangjia Hutong Primary School (北京市第五中学分校附属方家胡同小学)
- Beijing City No. 166 High School Affiliated Xiaowei Hutong Primary School (北京市第一六六中学附属校尉胡同小学)
- Beijing City No. 171 High School Affiliated Qingnianhu Primary School (北京市第一七一中学附属青年湖小学)
- Beijing City Dongzhimen High School Affiliated Yonghe Temple Primary School (北京市东直门中学附属雍和宫小学)
- Beijing City Guangqumen High School Affiliated Huashi Primary School (北京市广渠门中学附属花市小学)
- Beijing City Dongcheng District Wenhui Primary School (北京市东城区文汇小学)
