= List of schools in Xicheng, Beijing =

This is a list of schools in Xicheng, Beijing.

== Secondary schools ==
Note: In China, the word zhōngxué (中学, lit. "middle school") refers to any secondary school and differs from the American usage of the term "middle school" to mean specifically a lower secondary school or junior high school, while chūzhōng (初中) is used to refer to a lower secondary school.

- Asia-Pacific Experimental School of Beijing Normal University (北京师范大学亚太实验学校)
- Beijing No.2 Railway Middle School (Main Campus, and South Site)
- Beijing No. 3 High School
- Beijing No. 4 High School (Main Campus, East Campus, Guangwai Campus 广外校区, and Fuxingmen International Campus)
- Beijing No. 7 High School (北京市第七中学)
- Beijing No. 8 High School (Main Campus, Baiwanzhuang Campus 百万庄校区, Baiyunguan Campus 白云观校区, Dongli Campus 东里校区, Muxidi Campus, and Xili Campus 西里校区)
- Beijing No. 13 High School
- Beijing No. 15 Middle School (Junior and Senior High School Division)
- Beijing No. 31 Middle School
- Beijing No. 35 High School (separate campuses for Junior and Senior High School divisions and the international division)
- Beijing No. 39 Middle School
- Beijing No. 41 Middle School
- Beijing No. 43 Middle School (北京市第四十三中学, East and West Site)
- Beijing No. 56 High School (北京市第五十六中学)
- Beijing No. 66 High School (North Site 北址 and South Site 南址)
- Beijing No. 159 High School
- Beijing No. 161 High School (North, Central, South, and Branch Campus)
- Beijing Beiwei Road High School (北京市北纬路中学)
- Beijing Institute Education Affiliated High School (北京教育学院附属中学)
- Beijing Yucai School (Longquan Campus, 龙泉校区)
- Beijing EBSNU Huaxia Girls' Middle School (北京师范大学实验华夏女子中学)
- Beijing Experimental Vocational School (北京市实验职业学校, Main Campus and East Campus 东校区)
- Beijing Foreign Affairs Secondary School (北京市外事学校)
- Beijing Huimin School
- Beijing Lu Xun High School
- Beijing Sanfan Middle School (北京市三帆中学, Main Campus and Yuzhong Campus, 裕中校区)
- Beijing Shimei Vocational School (北京市实美职业学校) (Main Campus, Baiwanzhuang Campus 百万庄校区, and Ande Road Campus 安德路校区)
- Beijing Xicheng District Yuhua Secondary School (北京市西城区育华中学)
- Beijing Xicheng Vocational School (北京西城职业学校, Xizhimen Campus)
- Beijing Yucai School
- Beijing Yuetan High School (北京市月坛中学)
- Experimental High School Attached to Beijing Normal University
- The Foreign Language Experimental School of Xuanwu, Beijing (北京市宣武外国语实验学校)
- The Experimental Er Long Lu Middle School Attached to Beijing Normal University (北京师范大学实验二龙路中学)
- High School Affiliated to Beijing Normal University (Main Campus, and Branch Campus)
- Second High School Attached to Beijing Normal University (Main Campus, International Campus, and Xicheng Experimental School 西城实验学校)

== Primary schools ==
- Asia-Pacific Experimental School of Beijing Normal University (北京师范大学亚太实验学校)
- Beijing City Sanfan Middle School Affiliated Primary School (北京市三帆中学附属小学)
- Beijing City Xicheng District Beilishi Road No. 1 Primary School (北京市西城区北礼士路第一小学)
- Beijing City Xicheng District Liuyinjie Primary School (北京市西城区柳荫街小学) - Daxiangfeng Site (大翔凤址) and Meichang Hutong Site (煤厂胡同址)
- Beijing City Xicheng District Shunchengjie No. 1 Primary School (北京市西城区顺城街第一小学)
- Beijing City Xicheng District Ya'er Hutong Primary School (北京市西城区鸦儿胡同小学} - North and South Campus
- Beijing City Xicheng District Yumin Primary School (北京市西城区育民小学) - North and South Campus
- Beijing Lei Feng Primary School (北京雷锋小学) (Main Campus and Dongjie Campus)
- Beijing Primary School
  - Guang'anmen Nei Branch School (北京小学广安门内分校)
  - Hongshan Branch School (北京小学红山分校)
  - Tianning Temple Branch School (北京小学天宁寺分校) (East and West Site)
- Beijing No. 1 Experimental Primary School (北京第一实验小学) - Guangwai Campus (广外校区), Hepingmen Branch Campus (和平门校区), Hufangqiao Campus (虎坊桥校区), Qianmen Branch Campus (前门分校)
- Beijing No. 2 Experimental Primary School
  - Shoushuihe Branch School (涭水河分校) - Original Location and current interim location
  - Baiyun Road Branch School (白云路分校)
  - Chang'an Campus (长安校区)
  - Desheng Campus (德胜校区)
  - Guangwai Branch School (广外分校)
  - Wangfu Campus (王府校区)
  - Xinwenhuajie Campus (新文化街校区)
  - Yutaoyuan Campus (学玉桃园分校)
- Beijing No. 2 Experimental Primary School (北京第二实验小学) -
- Beijing No. 8 High School Affiliated Primary School (北京市第八中学附属小学)
- Beijing No. 15 Middle School Affiliated Primary School (北京市第十五中学附属小学)
- Beijing Normal University Jingshi Affiliated Primary School (北京师范大学京师附小) - Home Campus, Branch Campus 1, 2 and 3
- Beijing Xicheng District Chunshuguan Primary School (北京市西城区椿树馆小学)
- Beijing Xicheng District Denglai Primary School (北京市西城区登莱小学)
- Beijing Xicheng District Honglian Primary School (北京市西城区红莲小学)
- Beijing City Xuanwu Hui Ethnicity Primary School (北京市宣武回民小学) - Lower Elementary Campus (低年级部) and Upper Elementary Campus (高年级部)
- Beijing City Xuanwu Normal (Teacher Training) School Affiliated No. 1 Primary School (北京市宣武师范学校附属第一小学) - Main Campus, Liren Campus (里仁校区), and Youan Campus (右安校区)
- Beijing Yu Cai School (Main Campus and Taiping Road Campus 太平街校区)
- Xicheng District Baizhifang Primary School (西城区白纸坊小学)
- Xicheng District Beichang Road Primary School (西城区北长街小学)
- Xicheng District Changqiao Primary School (西城区厂桥小学) (North and South Campus)
- Xicheng District China-Cuba Friendship Primary School (西城区中古友谊小学) - Nanlishi Road Campus (南礼士路校区) and Sanlihe Campus (三里河校区)
- Xicheng District Experimental Primary School (西城区实验小学)
- Xicheng District Fendou Primary School (西城区奋斗小学) - East, North and West Campus
- Xicheng District Fuchengmenwai No. 1 Primary School (西城区阜成门外第一小学)
- Xicheng District Fuxingmenwai No. 1 Primary School (西城区复兴门外第一小学) - Lower and Upper Campus
- Xicheng District Hongmiao Primary School (西城区宏庙小学)
- Xicheng District Huajia Primary School (西城区华嘉小学) - West and East Campus
- Xicheng District Huangchenggen Primary School - Main Campus, Houguangping Campus (后广平校区), Guangyuan Campus (官园校区), and Yuyou Campus (育幼校区)
- Xicheng District Jinbu Primary School (西城区进步小学)
- Xicheng District Lixue Primary School (西城区力学小学)
- Xicheng District New Century Experimental Primary School (西城区新世纪实验小学)
- Xicheng District Normal (Teacher Training) School Affiliated Primary School (西城区师范学校附属小学) - Liupukang Campus (六铺炕校区) and Zhanlan Road Campus (展览路校区)
- Xicheng District Qingnianhu Primary School (西城区青年湖小学)
- Xicheng District Sanlihe No. 3 Primary School (西城区三里河第三小学) - North and South Campus
- Xicheng District Sanyili Primary School (西城区三义里小学) - Sanyili 4th Site (三义里4号址) and Sanyili 5th Site (三义里5号址)
- Xicheng District Shichahai Primary School (西城区什刹海小学) - Main and Branch Campus
- Xicheng District Tan'er Hutong Primary School (西城区炭儿胡同小学) - In Dashilan Subdistrict
- Xicheng District Taoranting Primary School (西城区陶然亭小学)
- Xicheng District Xiangchang Road Primary School (西城区香厂路小学) - Main and Branch Campus
- Xicheng District Wulutong Primary School (西城区五路通小学) - Main Campus and Education College Campus (教育学院校区)
- Xicheng District Xidan Primary School (西城区西单小学)
- Xicheng District Xishiku Primary School (西城区西什库小学)
- Xicheng District Yuxiang Primary School (西城区育翔小学) - Madian Principal Campus (马甸总校区), Deshengli Campus (德胜里校区), and Yangguang Campus (阳光校区)
- Xicheng District Zhicheng Primary School (西城区志成小学) - South and West Campus
- Xicheng District Zizhong Primary School (西城区自忠小学) - Main and Branch Campus (分校)
- Xicheng Normal (Teacher Training) Primary School (西城师范附小)
- Zhanlan Road No. 1 Primary School (展览路第一小学) - Main and Branch Campus
