= China–Cuba relations =

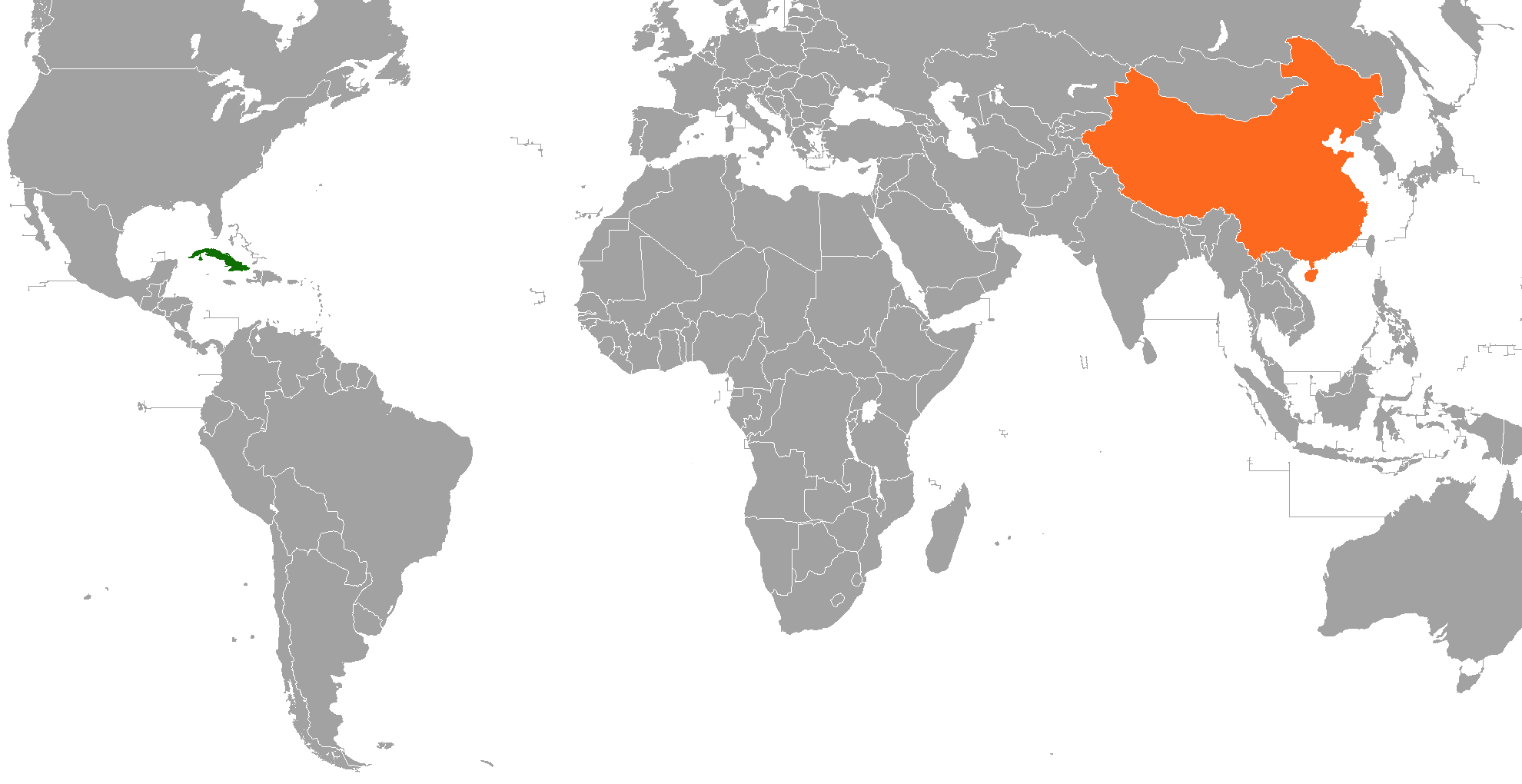

- Cuba: China

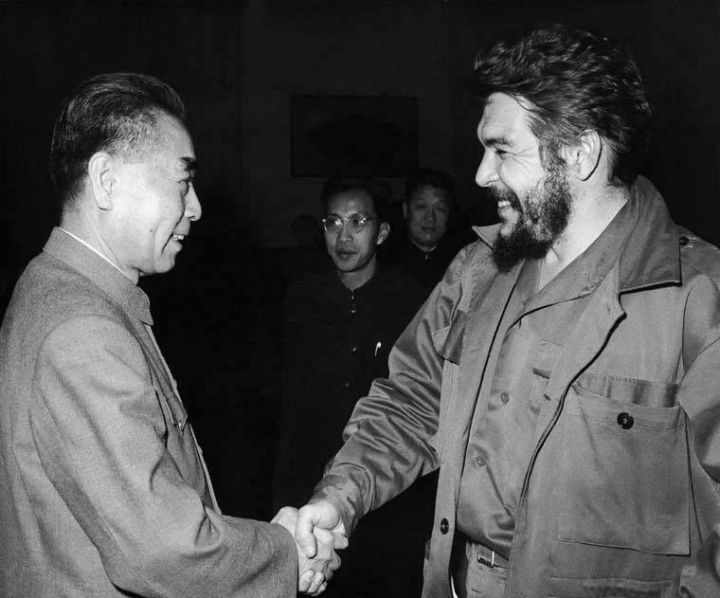
Zhou Enlai greeting Che Guevara in February 1965. This was the second time that Che Guevara visited China, the first time being November 1960.

Bilateral relations between China and Cuba began when the Qing dynasty established a consulate in Havana while Cuba was still a Captaincy General of Spain in 1879. In 1902, the Qing dynasty recognized the independence of the Republic of Cuba from the United States, which had taken it from Spain in 1898. Cuba recognized the PRC in September 1960.

The relations are based on trade, credits, and investments, which have increased significantly since the 1990s. China is Cuba's second-largest trading partner after Venezuela. At a ceremonial trade gathering in Havana in early 2006, China's ambassador to Cuba said, "Our government has a firm position to develop trade co-operation between our countries. The policy, the orientation, has been determined. What's left is the work to complete our plans." Although both Cuba and China are ruled by a communist party, they were on different sides during the Cold War, with Cuba being an ally of the Soviet Union, which China usually opposed following the Sino-Soviet Split.

China and Cuba maintain good relations, including through being members of the Belt and Road Initiative. China has partnered with Cuba to upgrade the rail network, host military facilities, and undertake other initiatives.

== History ==
On September 16, 1902, the Cuban government established relations with the Qing dynasty in Peking. This continued with the Beiyang government of the Republic of China and later, the Nationalist government in Nanking and Taipei after losing most of its territory. Both countries were allies in World War II. In 1960, post-revolutionary Cuba shifted its recognition to the People's Republic of China. It was the first Latin American country to recognize the PRC.

The relationship between Cuba and China deteriorated during the Sino-Soviet split, in part because Cuba valued its need for Soviet oil more than its need for Chinese rice. In 1979 and the following years, Cuba supported Vietnam in the Sino-Vietnamese War.

Tensions between Cuba and China remained until the late 1980s. In the late 1980s, Cuba's relationship with the Soviet Union became strained. After the 1989 Tiananmen Square protests and massacre, international relations with China were hampered. A series of Cuban-Chinese state visits followed and relations improved.

In the late 1990s, China provided the Cuban government with equipment to block signals from Radio Martí.

CCP general secretary Hu Jintao visited Cuba in November 2004, followed by a visit by his successor, Xi Jinping, in July 2014. In 2023, China and Cuba signed a bilateral cybersecurity agreement designed to prevent political subversion. China subsequently invested US$100 million in Cuban cybersecurity.

During the 2026 Cuban crisis, CCP general secretary Xi Jinping approved an aid package for Cuba, which includes financial assistance valued at 80 million dollars and a donation of 60,000 tons of rice.

== Economic relations ==
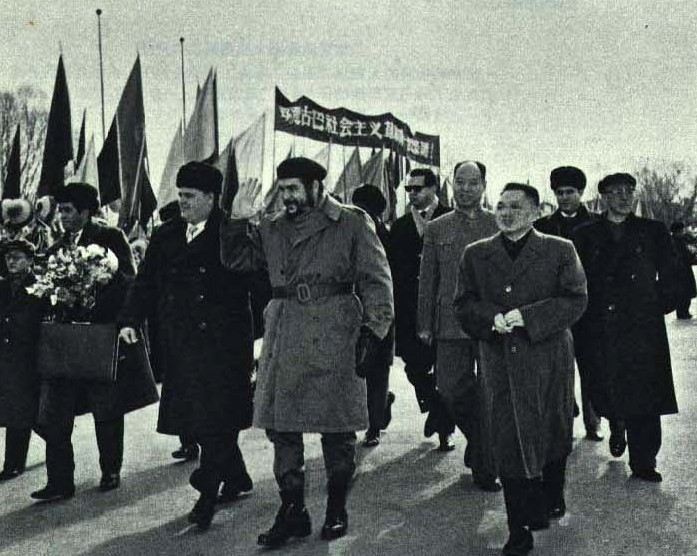
Che Guevara visiting China in 1965. To his left (on the right in the photo) is Deng Xiaoping.

After Cuba's 1960 recognition of the People's Republic of China, China became a major rice exporter to Cuba. In 1966, during the Sino-Soviet Split, China reduced its rice export quota to Cuba. The move increased diplomatic tensions, with Fidel Castro describing Mao Zedong as a senile idiot. As relations improved, China provided Cuba with interest-free credit for it to import home appliances in the early 2000s. The two countries then established a joint venture for the assembly of household electronics in Havana.

Bilateral trade between China and Cuba in 2005 totaled US$777 million, of which US$560 million were Chinese exports to Cuba. Bilateral trade between China and Cuba in 2014 totaled US$1.6 billion. China is sending a growing amount of durable goods to Cuba. Chinese goods have become the primary tools both in the planned revitalization of Cuban transport infrastructure and in the Energy Revolution of 2006 to provide electricity to the Cuban population. In 2010, China became Cuba's second-largest trading partner. Economic ties frayed in the 2010s due to troubles in the Cuban economy. Cuban imports from China fell from $1.7 billion in 2017 to $1.1 billion in 2022.

Cuba joined the Belt and Road Initiative (BRI) in 2019.

According to the Financial Times, Chinese officials have encouraged Cuba to implement economic reforms to shift from a planned economy to one similar to China's economic model, and "have been perplexed and frustrated at the Cuban leadership’s unwillingness to decisively implement a market-oriented reform programme despite the glaring dysfunction of the status quo".

=== Transportation ===
As of mid-2006, Cuba had purchased 100 locomotives from China for US$130 million. As of early 2006, Cuba had signed a contract for 1,000 Chinese buses for urban and inter-provincial transportation.

=== Consumer goods ===
The Cuban government is replacing older appliances with newer, more energy-efficient models, including (as of early 2006) 30,000 Chinese refrigerators.

=== Renewable energy ===
China has been a key partner in the development of Cuba's domestic solar panel production. It has provided Cuba with training, technology, and extended credit to Cuba to assist in this process.

== Investments ==
=== Nickel ===
As of 2004, China had agreed to planning to invest US$500 million in the completion and operation of Las Camariocas, an unfinished processing facility from the Soviet era. Under the agreement, Cubaníquel, the state-run nickel producer, owns 51 percent, and the Chinese government-owned Minmetals Corporation owns 49 percent. Financing for the project is from the China Development Bank, with Sinosure, the Chinese Export and Credit Insurance Corporation, providing guarantees.

=== Oil ===
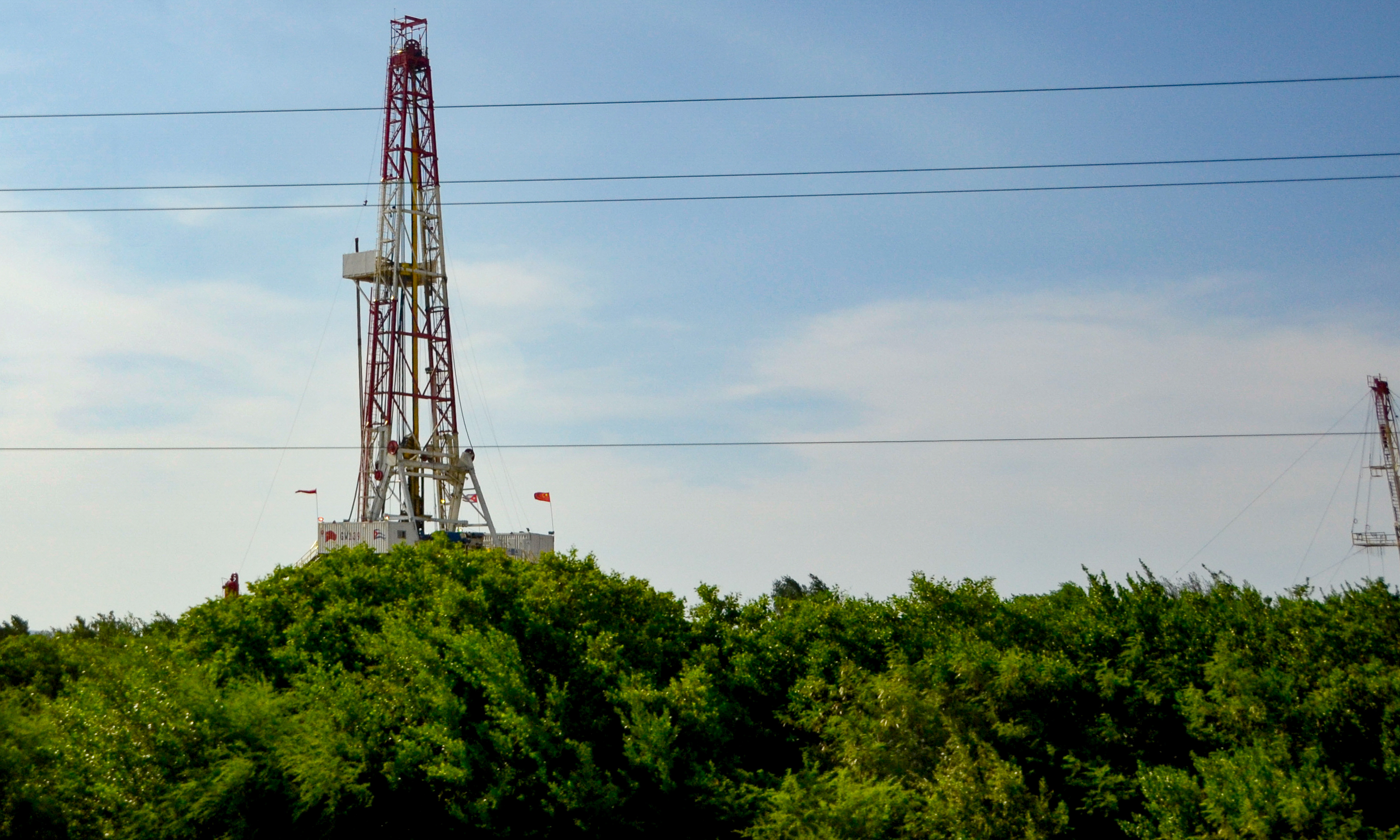
Chinese oil drilling rig in Cuba near Havana (2014)

SINOPEC, the Chinese state oil company, has an agreement with state-owned CUPET (Cuba Petroleum) to develop oil resources. As of mid-2008, SINOPEC had conducted some seismic testing for oil resources on the island of Cuba, but no drilling. The company also has a contract for joint production in one of Cuba's offshore areas of high yield potential, off the coast of Pinar del Río, but had conducted no offshore drilling as of mid-2008.

In November 2005, PetroChina Great Wall Drilling Co., Ltd. and CUPET held a ceremony for the signing of two drilling service contracts, to provide di; Great Wall Drilling has provided drilling rigs for oil exploration on Cuba's north coast.

=== Biotechnology ===
In December 2005, the two countries signed an agreement to develop biotech joint ventures within the next three to five years. Two manufacturing plants using Cuban technology and processes were operating in China as of early 2006. As of 2020, Cuba's Center for Genetic Engineering and Biotechnology (CIGB) had two joint ventures with China and its Center of Molecular Immunology (CIM) has three. When China made its first monoclonal antibodies, it did so with Cuban technology.

== Military and intelligence ==
Chinese personnel have been operating two signals intelligence (SIGINT) listening stations in Cuba since early 1999. Bejucal hosts a station operated by the People's Liberation Army Third Department of the Joint Staff Department. Other listening stations have been reported in Wajay and El Salao, Santiago de Cuba. In May 2026, The Wall Street Journal reported that China operates three SIGINT stations in Cuba, capable of intercepting communications across parts of the southeastern United States.

== Other areas of cooperation ==
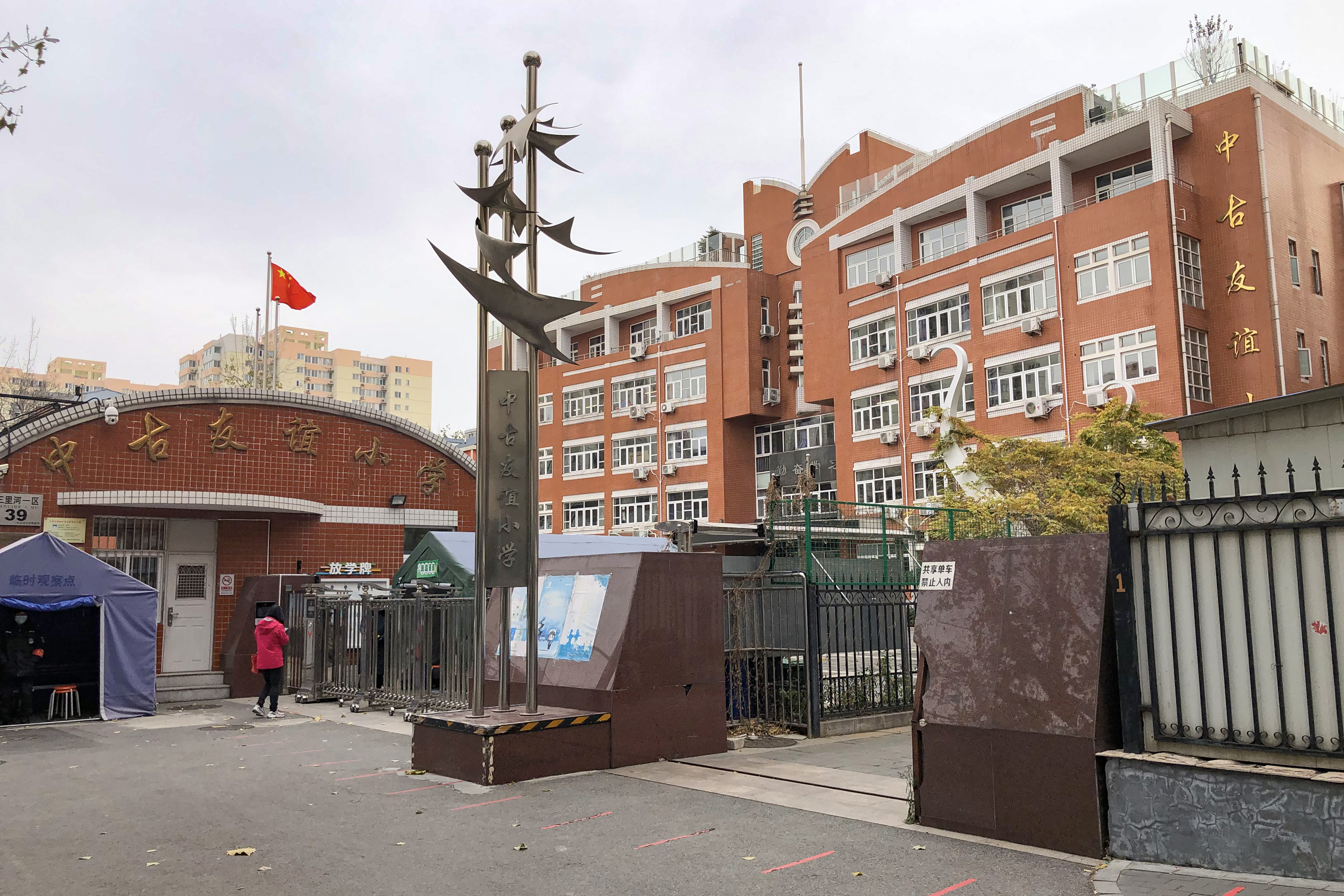
China-Cuba Friendship Primary School Sanlihe Campus (三里河校区)

- In 2004, China opened a local Confucius Institute in Havana.
- Scientific and technical exchange and innovation in the industrial and agriculture sectors
- Cultural exchanges
- Medical, education and training exchanges

== Sovereignty issues ==
Cuba follows the One China principle. It recognizes the People's Republic of China as the sole government of China and Taiwan as an integral part of China's territory, and supports all efforts by the PRC to "achieve national reunification".

Cuba was one of 53 countries that, in June 2020, backed the Hong Kong national security law at the United Nations.

In May 2026, China's foreign minister spokesperson, Guo Jiakun, issued a statement in support of Cuba's government following the U.S. indictment of Raul Castro.

== Resident diplomatic missions ==
of China in Cuba

- Havana (Embassy)

of Cuba in China

- Beijing (Embassy)
- Guangzhou (Consulate-General)
- Shanghai (Consulate-General)

== See also ==
- Caribbean–China relations
- Sino-Latin America relations
- Chinese Cubans
- Belt and Road Initiative
- Foreign relations of Cuba
- Foreign relations of China
