= Zhang Xu (engineer) =

Chinese telecommunications engineer

Zhang Xu (Chinese: 张煦; 6 November 1913 – 12 September 2015) was a Chinese telecommunications engineer and academic who taught for more than five decades at Shanghai Jiao Tong University and the University of Electronic Science and Technology of China. He was the first professor in China to teach radio communications and played a major role in the development of fiber-optic communication in the country. He was elected an academician of the Chinese Academy of Sciences in 1980.

== Biography ==
Zhang was born on 6 November 1913 in Wuxi, Jiangsu, Republic of China. After graduating from the Department of Electrical Engineering from National Chiao Tong University (now Shanghai Jiao Tong University) in 1934 with top grades, he was awarded a government scholarship to study in the United States. He completed his master and Ph.D. degrees at Harvard University in 1936 and 1940, respectively.

Zhang returned to China in 1940 and became a professor in the Department of Telecommunications at National Chiao Tong University. He also taught as an adjunct professor at Tongji University, University of Shanghai, and Utopia University. He was the first professor in China to teach radio communications.

In 1956, he was transferred to the newly established Chengdu Institute of Radio Engineering (now University of Electronic Science and Technology of China), where he taught for the next 22 years. He returned to Shanghai Jiao Tong University in 1978 and served as Chair of the Electrical Engineering Department of the university. He was elected an academician of the Chinese Academy of Sciences in 1980.

Zhang died on 12 September 2015 in Shanghai, at the age of 101.

== Contributions ==
As one of the experts who helped establish China's telecommunications networks, Zhang is considered a telecommunications pioneer in the country. Together with Ye Peida and Huang Hongjia, he played a major role in developing fiber-optic communication in China in the 1980s. In 1988, Zhang and Ye published a report that advised the breakup of the monopoly that the Ministry of Posts and Communications held in China's telecommunications industry. The Chinese government adopted their proposal and created shareholding companies to operate the country's telecom networks.

Zhang authored, edited, or translated 56 books and published more than 400 articles, including about 100 research papers. His teaching career spanned more than five decades until his eighties. He educated nearly 1,000 students, including academicians Li Lemin and Zhao Zisen.
