= List of schools in Fangshan, Beijing =

This is a list of schools in Fangshan District, Beijing.

== Secondary schools ==
Note: In China the word 中学 zhōngxué, literally translated as "middle school", refers to any secondary school and differs from the American usage of the term "middle school" to mean specifically a lower secondary school or junior high school. 初中 chūzhōng is used to refer to a lower secondary school.

- Beijing No. 4 High School Fangshan Branch School (北京四中房山分校)
- Beijing No. 12 High School Langyue School (朗悦学校)
- Beijing City Yanshan Qianjin High School (北京市燕山前进中学)
- Beijing City Yanshan Xiangyang High School (北京市燕山向阳中学)
- Beijing City Yanshan Xingcheng High School (北京市燕山星城中学)
- Beijing City Fangshan No. 4 High School (北京市房山第四中学)
- Beijing City Fangshan District 401 School (北京市房山区四〇一学校)
- Beijing City Fangshan District Beiluyuan School (北京市房山区北潞园学校)
- Beijing City Fangshan District Daning School (北京市房山区大宁学校)
- Beijing City Fangshan District Haotian School (北京市房山区昊天学校)
- Beijing City Fangshan District Beiluo High School (北京市房山区北洛中学)
- Beijing City Fangshan District Changyang High School (北京市房山区长阳中学)
- Beijing City Fangshan District Chenxi High School (北京市房山区晨曦中学)
- Beijing City Fangshan District Doudian High School (北京市房山区窦店中学)
- Beijing City Fangshan District Experimental High School (北京市房山区实验中学)
- Beijing City Fangshan District Fangshan High School (北京市房山区房山中学)
- Beijing City Fangshan District Fangshan No. 2 High School (北京市房山区房山第二中学)
- Beijing City Fangshan District Fangshan No. 3 High School (北京市房山区房山第三中学)
- Beijing City Fangshan District Fangshan No. 5 High School (北京市房山区房山第五中学)
- Beijing City Fangshan District Hancunhe High School (北京市房山区韩村河中学)
- Beijing City Fangshan District Hulufa High School (北京市房山区葫芦垡中学)
- Beijing City Fangshan District Jiaodao High School (北京市房山区交道中学)
- Beijing City Fangshan District Liangxiang High School (北京市房山区良乡中学)
- Beijing City Fangshan District Liangxiang No. 2 High School (北京市房山区良乡第二中学)
- Beijing City Fangshan District Liangxiang No. 3 High School (北京市房山区良乡第三中学)
- Beijing City Fangshan District Liangxiang No. 4 High School (北京市房山区良乡第四中学)
- Beijing City Fangshan District Liangxiang No. 5 High School (北京市房山区良乡第五中学)
- Beijing City Fangshan District Liangxiang No. 6 High School (北京市房山区良乡第六中学)
- Beijing City Fangshan District Liulihe High School (北京市房山区琉璃河中学)
- Beijing City Fangshan District Nanliyuan High School (北京市房山区南梨园中学)
- Beijing City Fangshan District Nanshangle High School (北京市房山区南尚乐中学)
- Beijing City Fangshan District Nanzhao High School (北京市房山区南召中学)
- Beijing City Fangshan District Qinglonghu High School (北京市房山区青龙湖中学)
- Beijing City Fangshan District Shilou High School (北京市房山区石楼中学)
- Beijing City Fangshan District Shiwo High School (北京市房山区石窝中学)
- Beijing City Fangshan District Tuoli High School (北京市房山区坨里中学) Beijing Institute of Education Fangshan Experimental School (北京教育学院房山实验学校) - Junior High School Division (初中部) and Senior High School Division (高中部)
- Beijing City Fangshan District Xiacun High School (北京市房山区夏村中学)
- Beijing City Fangshan District Yuegezhuang High School (北京市房山区岳各庄中学)
- Beijing City Fangshan District Zhangfang High School (北京市房山区张坊中学)
- Beijing City Fangshan District Zhanggou High School (北京市房山区长沟中学)
- Beijing City Fangshan District Zhoukoudian High School (北京市房山区周口店中学)
- Beijing Normal University Liangxiang Affiliated High School (北京师范大学良乡附属中学)
- Beijing Normal University Yanhua Affiliated High School (北京师范大学燕化附属中学)
- Capital Normal University Affiliated Fangshan High School (首都师范大学附属房山中学)

== Primary schools ==
- Beijing City Fangshan District Beiluyuan School (北京市房山区北潞园学校)
- Beijing City Fangshan District Haotian School (北京市房山区昊天学校)
