= List of schools in Mentougou, Beijing =

This is a list of schools in Mentougou District, Beijing.

== Secondary schools ==
Note: In China the word 中学 zhōngxué, literally translated as "middle school", refers to any secondary school and differs from the American usage of the term "middle school" to mean specifically a lower secondary school or junior high school. 初中 chūzhōng is used to refer to a lower secondary school.

- Beijing No. 8 High School Beijing West Campus (北京市第八中学京西校区)
- Beijing City Sanjiadian Railway High School (北京市三家店铁路中学)
- Beijing City Wang Ping High School (北京市王平中学)
- Beijing City Yuyuan High School (北京市育园中学)
- Beijing City Mentougou District Dayu High School (北京市门头沟区大峪中学) - Main Campus, West Campus (西校区), and Branch School (分校)
- Beijing City Mentougou District Jingshi Experimental High School (北京市门头沟京师实验中学)
- Beijing City Mentougou District Junzhuang High School (北京市门头沟区军庄中学)
- Beijing City Mentougou District Miaofengshan Ethnic High School (北京市门头沟区妙峰山民族学校)
- Beijing City Mentougou District Qingshui High School (北京市门头沟区清水中学)
- Beijing City Mentougou District Tanzhe Temple High School (北京市门头沟区潭柘寺中学)
- Beijing City Mentougou District Xinqiao Road High School (北京市门头沟区新桥路中学)
- Beijing City Mentougou District Zhaitang High School (北京市门头沟区斋堂中学)
- Capital Normal University Affiliated High School (首都师范大学附属中学) Yongding Branch School (永定分校)
