= List of schools in Changping, Beijing =

This is a list of schools in Changping District, Beijing.

== Secondary schools ==
Note: In China the word 中学 zhōngxué, gets translated as "middle school", but actually means secondary school. 初中 chūzhōng is the real word for middle school.

- Beijing No. 15 Middle School Nankou School (北京市第十五中学南口学校)
- Beijing City Changping Vocational School (北京市昌平职业学校) - Main Campus and Nankou Campus (南口校区)
- Beijing City Changping District Baishan School (北京市昌平区百善学校)
- Beijing City Changping District Heishanzhai School (北京市昌平区黑山寨学校)
- Beijing City Changping District Taowa School (北京市昌平区桃洼学校)
- Beijing City Changping District Xiazhuang School (北京市昌平区下庄学校)
- Beijing City Changping District No. 1 High School (北京市昌平区第一中学) - Main Campus and Tiantongyuan Campus (天通苑校区)
- Beijing City Changping District No. 2 High School (北京市昌平区第二中学)
- Beijing City Changping District No. 4 High School (北京市昌平区第四中学)
- Beijing City Changping District Cuicun High School (北京市昌平区崔村中学)
- Beijing City Changping District Dadongliu High School (北京市昌平区大东流中学)
- Beijing City Changping District Liucun High School (北京市昌平区流村中学)
- Beijing City Changping District Nankoutiedaobei High School (北京市昌平区南口铁道北中学)
- Beijing City Changping District Nanshao High School (北京市昌平区南邵中学)
- Beijing City Changping District Pingxifu High School (北京市昌平区平西府中学)
- Beijing City Changping District Shangyuan High School (北京市昌平区上苑中学)
- Beijing Normal University Changping Affiliated School (北京师范大学昌平附属学校)
- Second High School Attached to Beijing Normal University Weilaikejicheng School (北京师范大学第二附属中学未来科技城学校)
- Capital Normal University Affiliated Huilong Guanyu Xin School (首都师范大学附属回龙观育新学校)
- Capital Normal University High School Changping School (首都师范大学附属中学昌平学校)
- China University of Petroleum Affiliated High School (中国石油大学附属中学)
- China University of Political Science and Law Affiliated School (中国政法大学附属学校)
- North China Electric Power University Affiliated High School (华北电力大学附属中学)
- Tingzizhuang School (亭自庄学校) - Secondary School Campus (中学校区), Center Campus (中心校区), and Tulou Campus (土楼校区)
- Xingshou School (兴寿学校)
- Yandan School (燕丹学校)
- Zhongtan High School (中滩中学)
- Special Child Education School (特殊儿童教育学校)

== Primary schools ==
- Beijing City Changping District No. 4 High School Primary School Division (北京市昌平区第四中学小学部)
- Tsinghua University Primary School Affiliated Changping School (清华大学附属小学昌平学校)

== Private and international schools ==
- Beijing Huijia Private School is in Changping District.
- Beijing Royal School
- The Korean International School in Beijing was previously located in Changping District.
