= Ma Dayou =

Chinese physicist

Ma Dayou (Dah-You Maa)
- Born: March 1, 1915; Beijing, China
- Died: July 17, 2012 (aged 97); Beijing, China
- Education: Peking University; UCLA; Harvard University
- Scientific career
- Fields: Acoustics

Chinese name
- Simplified Chinese: 马大猷
Transcriptions
Standard Mandarin
- Hanyu Pinyin: Mǎ Dàyóu
- Wade–Giles: Ma Ta-yu

Ma Dayou or Dah-You Maa (Chinese: 马大猷; March 1, 1915 – July 17, 2012) was a Chinese acoustical physicist, specializing in various aspects of acoustics, especially sound generation, transmission and absorption. Academician of Chinese Academy of Sciences (CAS), Ma was a research professor at Institute of Acoustics of CAS; Chairman of Chinese National Acoustics Standardization Technical Committee; and Editor-in-Chief of Chinese Journal of Acoustics.

== Early life and education ==
Ma was born in 1915 in Beijing, to a poor and intellectual family. His father was educated in Japan and obtained his law degree at Meiji University. Ma Dayou attended the High School Affiliated to Beijing Normal University. In 1936, he graduated from Peking University and went to U.S. for further studies. He researched at UCLA and got his doctorate degree at Harvard University in 1940.

== Career ==
In 1938, Ma published his first research paper, under the direction of Dr. Vern Oliver Knudsen, renowned UCLA acoustical physicist, "The distribution of the low frequency normal mode in a rectangular room", which was considered later as the benchmark for applied normal mode theory and room acoustics. At Harvard, he involved in the research task of "The decay of sound in rectangular room" and published a series of papers on the topic. In his lifetime, Ma published some 30 papers on room acoustics based on normal mode theory, and around 150 including other topics, thereafter. Ma published more than 180 papers on room acoustics and some other subjects.

In 1940, during the Sino-Japanese war, Ma went back to China through Viet Nam and took a faculty tenure at the wartime temporary university in Kunming - National Southwestern Associated University. In 1942, at the age of 27, he was promoted as professor of Department of Electrical Engineering, the youngest professor of the whole university.

In 1943, Ma was elected as a fellow of the Acoustical Society of America, the only Chinese national member of ASA at the time.

Ma returned to Beijing in 1946 where he became the first Dean of Engineering Department of Peking University.

In 1955, Ma was one of the founding member of Chinese Academy of Sciences.

In 1956, Ma designed and built the first acoustics laboratories in China, including reverberation chambers, sound insulation measurement rooms, anechoic chamber, high intensity acoustic noise testing chamber, and water tank for underwater acoustics measurements.

In 1959, he was charge of the acoustic design work of the Great Hall of the People.

According to Ma's Harvard classmate and friend, MIT professor Leo Beranek's paper published in 2013, during the Cultural Revolution period in China (1966-1976), Ma was under house arrest. But according to a paper published the same year by one of his post-graduate student, Tian Jing (田静), in 1966, Ma gave a formula of jet noise power via air pressure and invented micro-perforated panel absorbers and micro-perforation jet mufflers. These were the main missions of a ad hoc task force Ma headed, in order to prepare for the missile tests China was about to launch.

In 2012, ASA selected Ma as its 19th honorary fellow at the first joint meeting of ASA and Acoustical Society of China held in Hong Kong.
