= Second High School Attached to Beijing Normal University =

School in Beijing, China

Coordinates: 39.9600°N 116.3718°E

The Second High School Attached to Beijing Normal University
- 北京师范大学第二附属中学

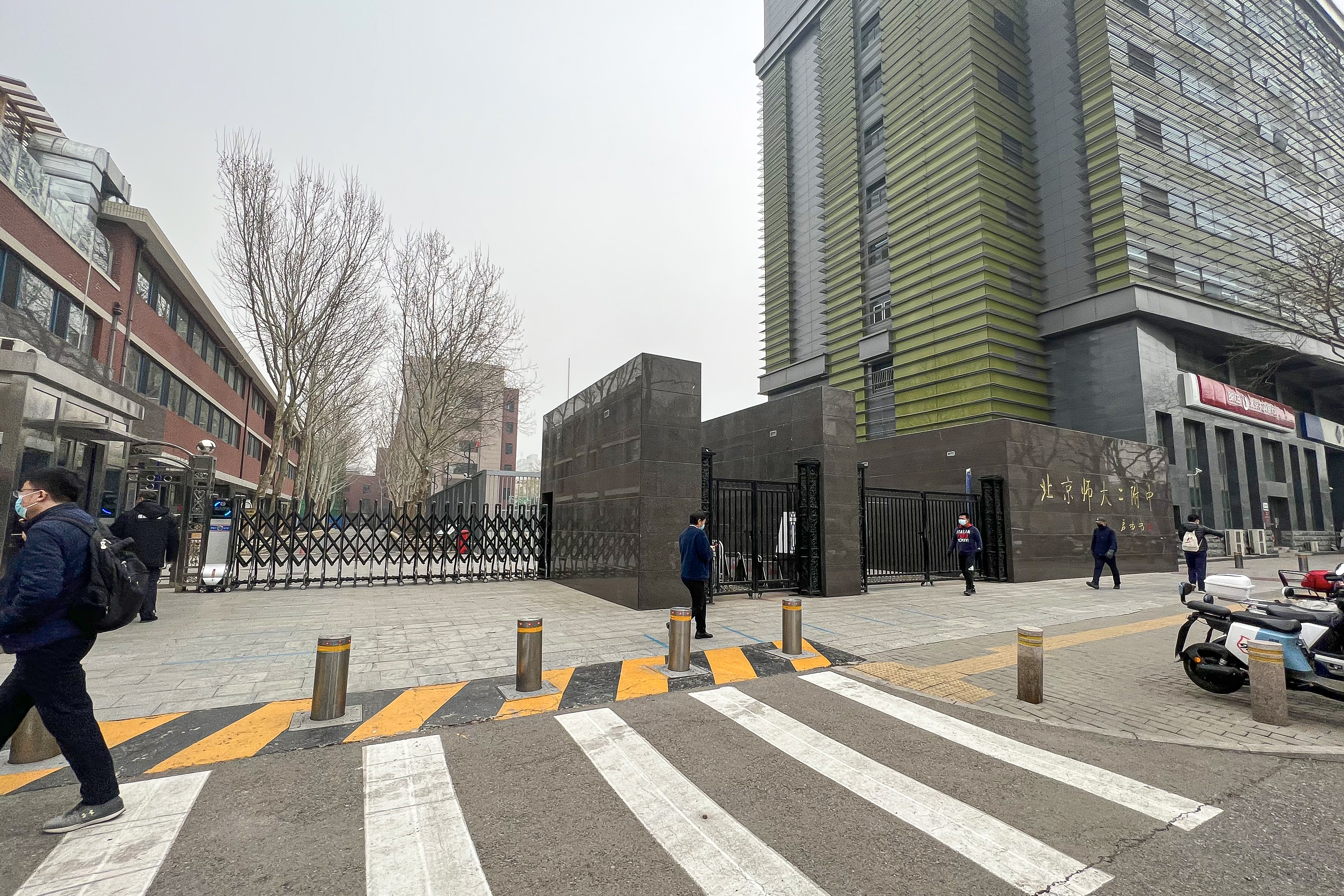

Location
- No.12 Xinjiekou Wai Street, Xicheng District; Beijing, Beijing Municipality; China

Information
- Type: Public
- Motto: 笃志、博学、质朴、方正
- Established: 1953
- School district: Xicheng
- Principal: Hua Wang (王华)
- Faculty: 118
- Colors: Red, Yellow, Blue
- Song: 三色帆
- Mascot: The Sail of Three Colors
- Nickname: 三色帆
- Website: http://www.shsbnu.net

Second High School Attached to Beijing Normal University
- Simplified Chinese: 北京师范大学第二附属中学
- Traditional Chinese: 北京師範大學第二附屬中學
Transcriptions
Standard Mandarin
- Hanyu Pinyin: Běijīng Shīfàn Dàxué Dì'èr Fùshǔ Zhōngxué

The Second High School Attached to Beijing Normal University (北京师范大学第二附属中学) is a public secondary school in Xicheng, Beijing, China. The school was founded in 1953.

== See also ==
- List of schools in Xicheng, Beijing
