= High School Affiliated to Beijing Normal University =

Coordinates: 37°46′N 122°26′E

The High School Affiliated to Beijing Normal University
- 北京师范大学附属中学
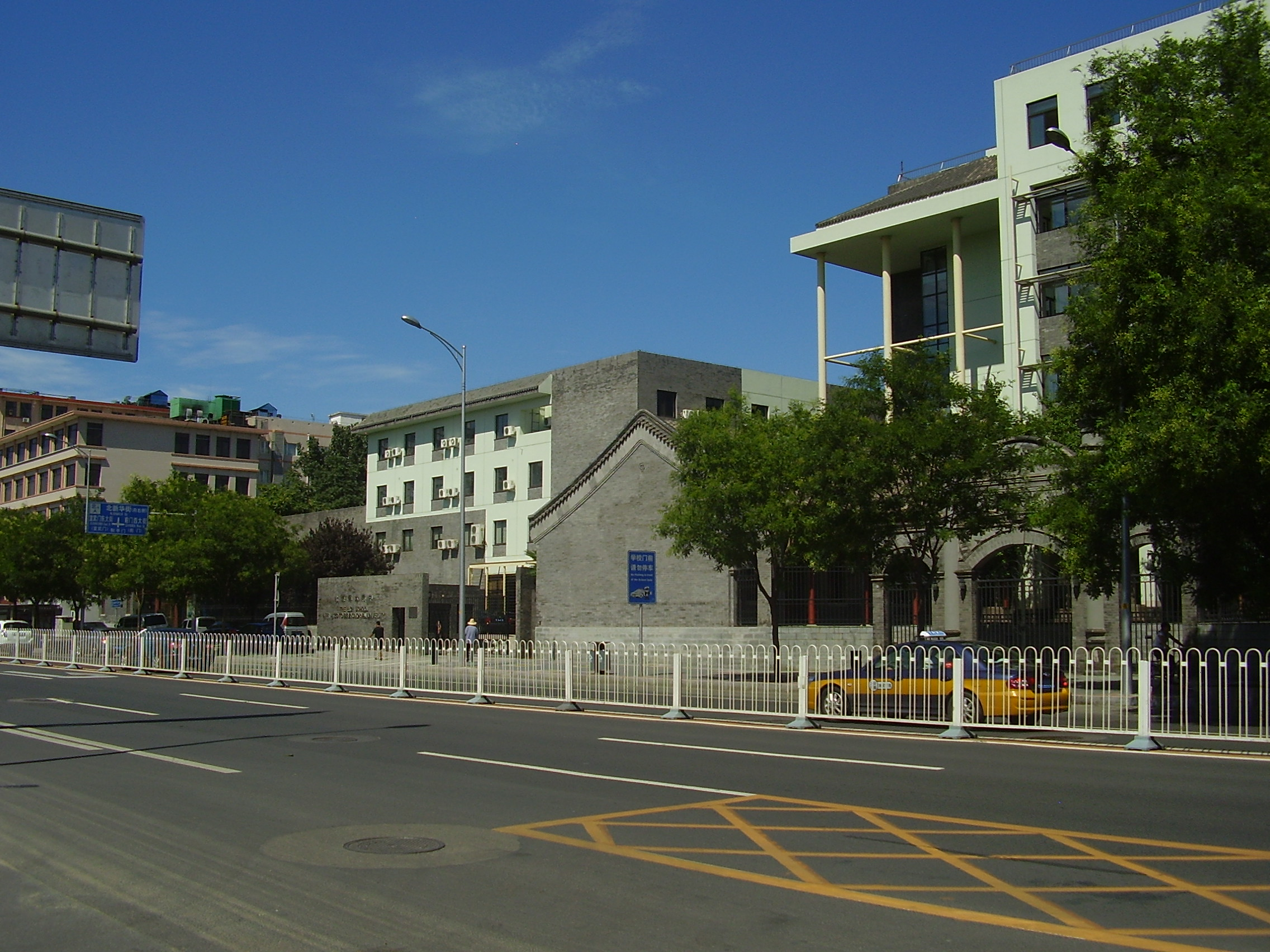
- East Campus (东区) as viewed from Nanxinhuajie.

Location
- 18 Nanxinhuajie St; Xicheng; Beijing 100052; China

Information
- Established: November 2, 1901; Wanping, Shuntian Prefecture, Qing dynasty (124 years, 186 days ago)
- Principal: Wang Liping
- Campus Director: Kuang Li
- Affiliation: Beijing Normal University
- Website: www.bjsdfz.com

High School Affiliated to Beijing Normal University
- Simplified Chinese: 北京师范大学附属中学
- Traditional Chinese: 北京師範大學附屬中學
Transcriptions
Standard Mandarin
- Hanyu Pinyin: Běijīng Shīfàn Dàxué Fùshǔ Zhōngxué

The High School Affiliated to Beijing Normal University (北京师范大学附属中学) is a public secondary school affiliated with Beijing Normal University, located in Xicheng, Beijing, China.

== Alumni ==
- Zhao Shiyan
- Ma Dayou
- Qian Xuesen
- Ma Dayou
- Li Landi

== See also ==
- List of schools in Xicheng, Beijing
