= List of schools in Yanqing, Beijing =

This is a list of schools in Yanqing District, Beijing.

== Secondary schools ==
Note: In China the word 中学 zhōngxué, literally translated as "middle school", refers to any secondary school and differs from the American usage of the term "middle school" to mean specifically a lower secondary school or junior high school. 初中 chūzhōng is used to refer to a lower secondary school.

- Beijing City Yanqing District National Day School (北京市延庆区十一学校)
- Beijing City Yanqing District Xiangying School (北京市延庆区香营学校)
- Beijing City Yanqing District Yongning School (北京市延庆区永宁学校)
- Beijing City Yanqing District Zhangshanying School (北京市延庆区张山营学校)
- Beijing City Yanqing District No. 1 High School (北京市延庆区第一中学)
- Beijing City Yanqing District No. 2 High School (北京市延庆区第二中学)
- Beijing City Yanqing District No. 3 High School (北京市延庆区第三中学)
- Beijing City Yanqing District No. 4 High School (北京市延庆区第四中学)
- Beijing City Yanqing District No. 5 High School (北京市延庆区第五中学)
- Beijing City Yanqing District No. 8 High School (北京市延庆区第八中学)
- Beijing City Yanqing District No. 1 Vocational School (北京市延庆区第一职业学校)
- Beijing City Yanqing District Badaling High School (北京市延庆区八达岭中学)
- Beijing City Yanqing District Dayushu High School (北京市延庆区大榆树中学)
- Beijing City Yanqing District Jingzhuang High School (北京市延庆区井庄中学)
- Beijing City Yanqing District Kangzhuang High School (北京市延庆区康庄中学)
- Beijing City Yanqing District Liubinbao High School (北京市延庆区刘斌堡中学)
- Beijing City Yanqing District Jiuxian High School (北京市延庆区旧县中学)
- Beijing City Yanqing District Physical Education High School (北京市延庆区体育运动学校)
- Beijing City Yanqing District Shenjiaying High School (北京市延庆区沈家营中学)
- Beijing City Yanqing District Xiatun High School (北京市延庆区下屯中学)
- Beijing City Yanqing District Special Education Center (北京市延庆区特殊教育中心)
