= China-Cuba Friendship Primary School =

Public primary school in Beijing, China

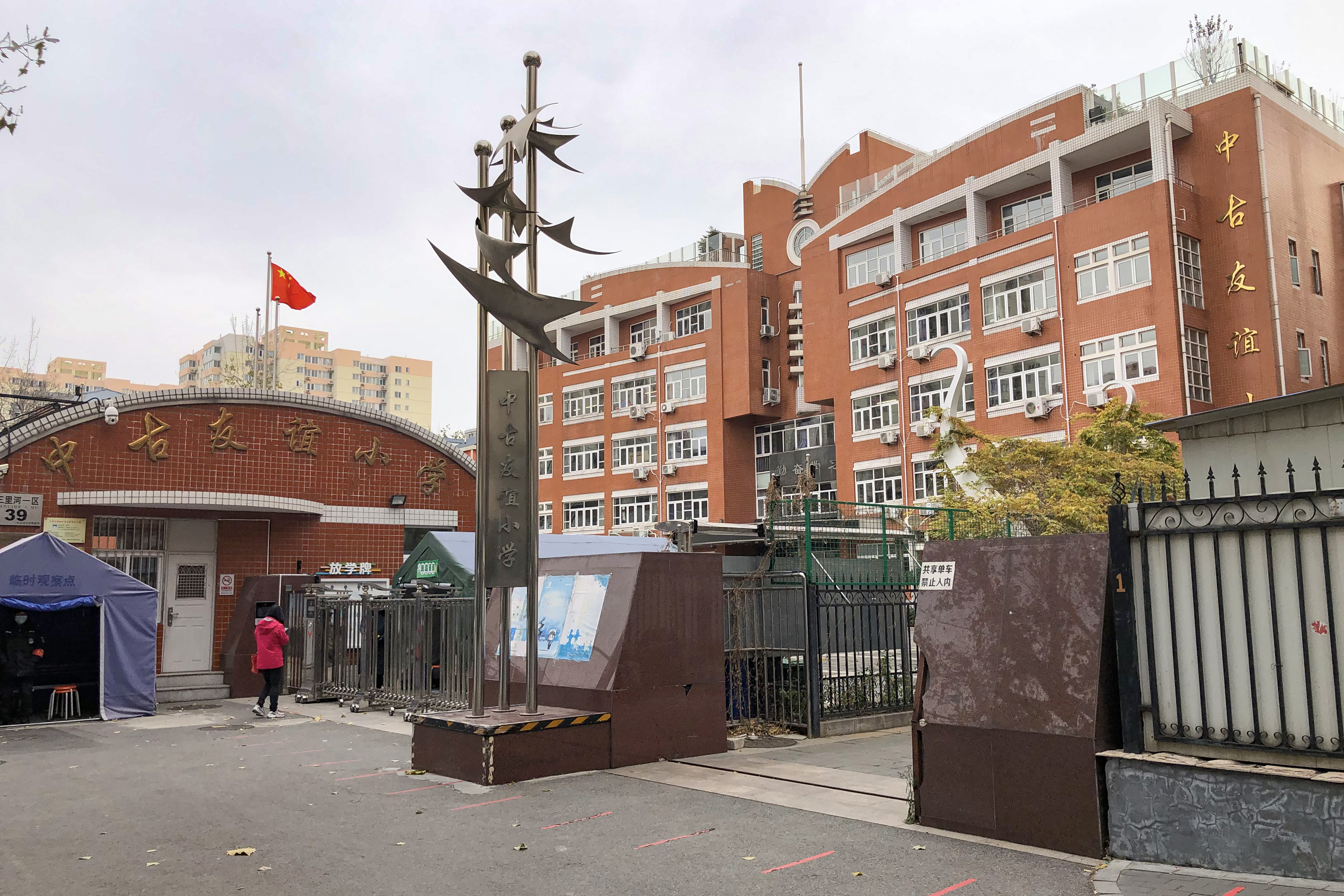
- Sanlihe Campus

Chinese name
- Simplified Chinese: 北京市西城区中古友谊小学
- Traditional Chinese: 北京市西城區中古友誼小學
- Literal meaning: Beijing City Xicheng District China-Cuba Friendship Primary School
Transcriptions
Standard Mandarin
- Hanyu Pinyin: Běijīng Shì Xīchéng Qū Zhōng Gǔ Yǒuyì

Spanish name
- Spanish: Escuela Primaria Amistad China–Cuba

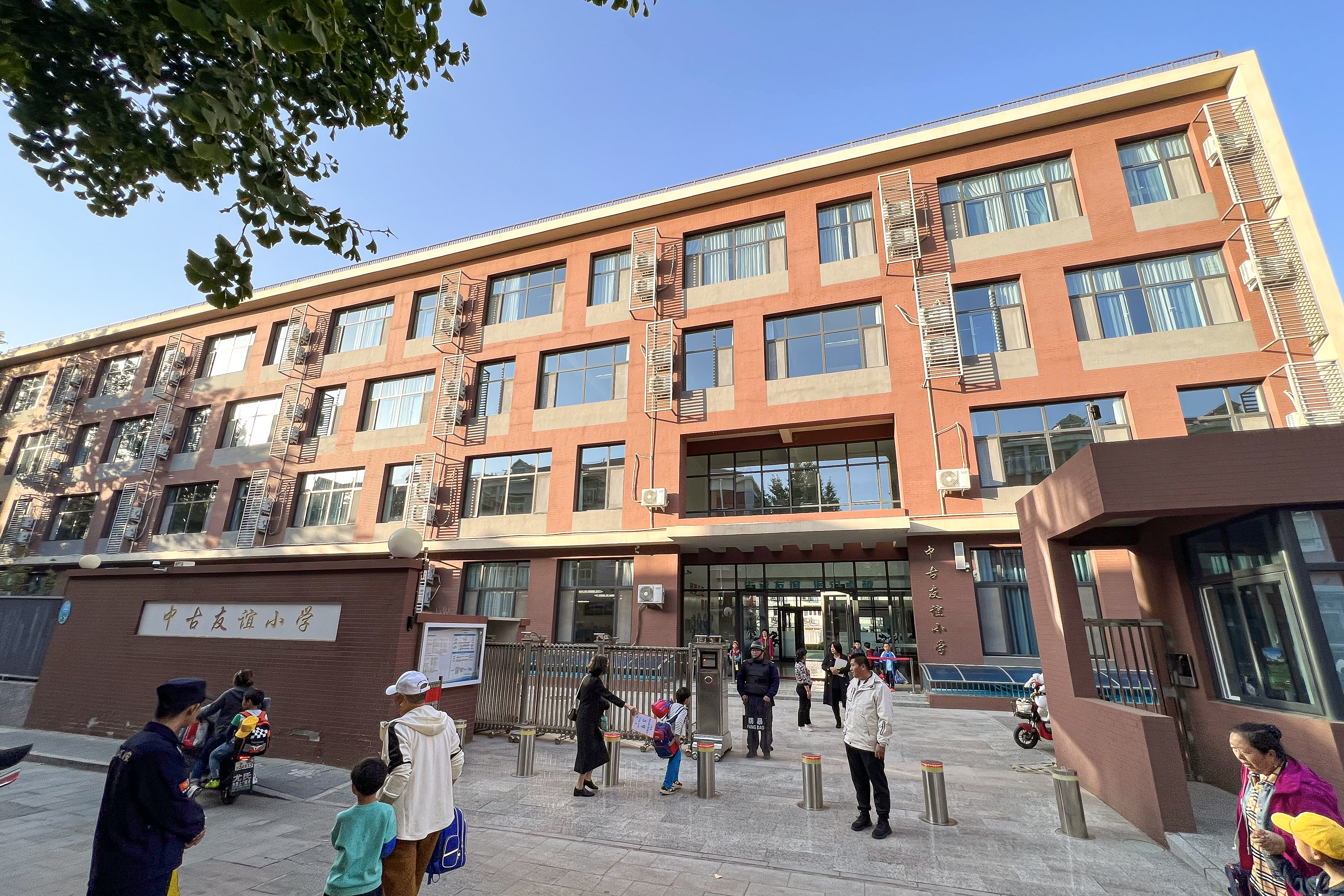
Fuwai campus for grades 1 and 2

Beijing City Xicheng District China-Cuba Friendship Primary School (Chinese: 北京市西城区中古友谊小学, Spanish: Escuela Primaria Amistad China–Cuba) is a public primary school with its main campus in Xicheng, Beijing. In addition to the Sanlihe Campus (三里河校区) the school also has the Fuwai Campus (阜外校区) for grades 1 and 2. Before the renovation of Fuwai campus in 2022, Grades 1 and 2 were allocated to the temporary Nanlishi Road Campus (南礼士路校区).

It was established in 1954. It received its current name in 1964 due to a name change imposed by the Chinese Ministry of Foreign Affairs.

There had been multiple international exchange events between the school and Cuba after the rename.

== See also ==
- China–Cuba relations
