= Beijing No.4 High School =

- 北京市第四中学

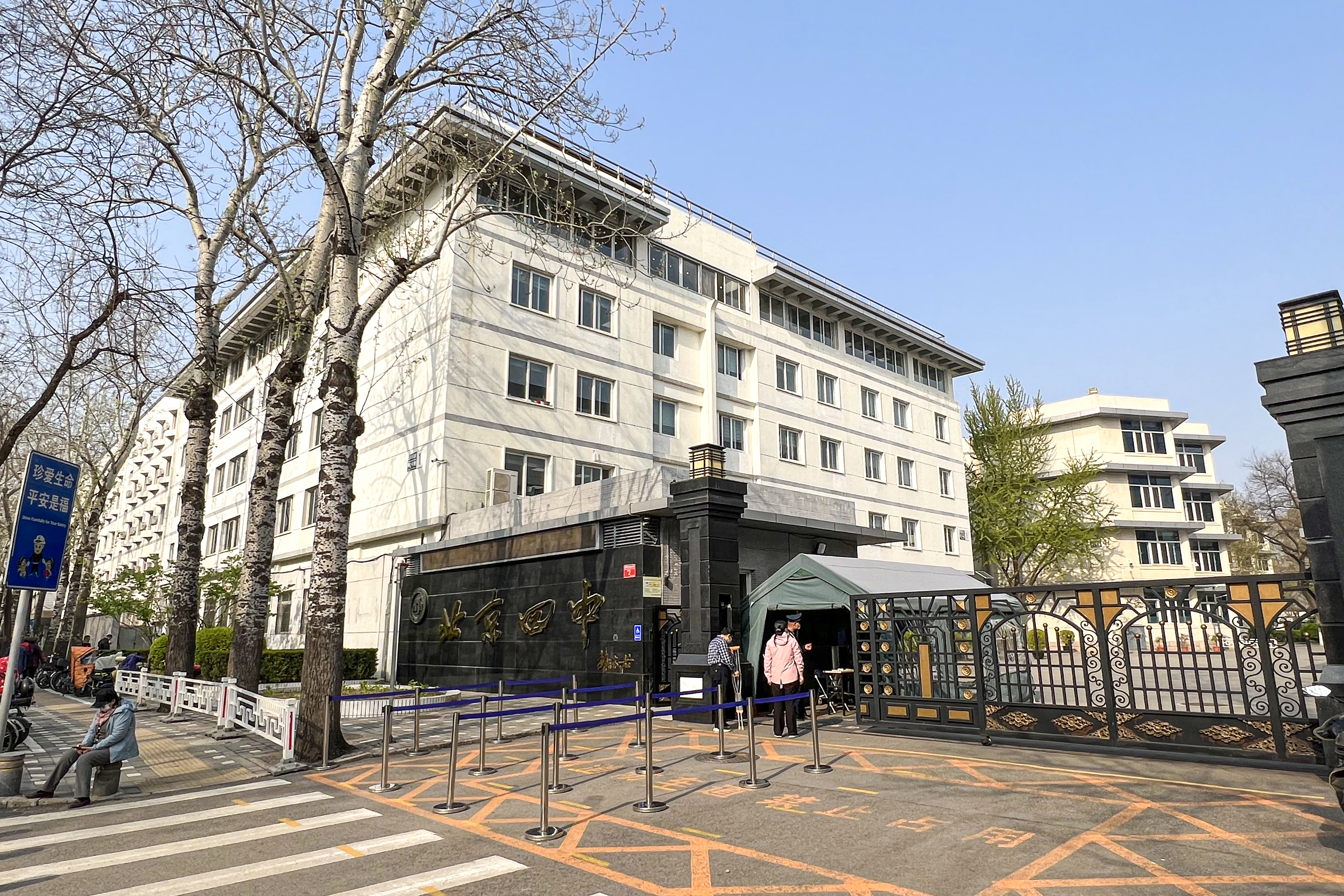
- School gate

Location
- A2 West Huangchenggen North St; Xicheng, Beijing; China
- Coordinates: 39.931262°N 116.378257°E

Information
- Type: Public
- Motto: Diligence, Rigor, Democracy and Pioneering
- Established: 1906; 120 years ago (as Shun-Tian Secondary School)
- School district: Xicheng District
- Principal: Ma Jinglin (马景林)
- Faculty: 300 (Main Campus)
- Enrollment: 1500 (Main Campus)
- Campus type: Urban
- Colors: Dark Blue; White
- Song: Song of Hope and Ideal
- Branches: Senior High Campus; Junior High Campus; International Campus; Fangshan Campus; Shunyi Campus; Hohhot Campus
- Website: bhsf.cn

Beijing No.4 High School is a public secondary school in Xicheng, Beijing, China. It was established in 1906 as "Shun-Tian Secondary School" (named and funded by Shuntian Prefecture), later changed its name to "No.4 Secondary School of Peking" in 1912.

"Beijing No.4 High School" has been the official name since the Chinese Communist Party took over the power in 1949. The school currently has four campuses: high school (main campus), junior high school (east campus), Guang'anmenwai campus, and Fuxingmen international campus.

== See also ==
- Beacon high schools in Beijing
- List of schools in Xicheng, Beijing
