= List of educational institutions in Miyun, Beijing =

This is a list of educational institutions, including primary and secondary schools, in Miyun District, Beijing.

== Secondary schools ==
Note: In China the word 中学 zhōngxué, literally translated as "middle school", refers to any secondary school and differs from the American usage of the term "middle school" to mean specifically a lower secondary school or junior high school. 初中 chūzhōng is used to refer to a lower secondary school.

- Beijing City Miyun District Dachengzi School (北京市密云区大城子学校)
- Beijing City Miyun District Gaoling School (北京市密云区高岭学校)
- Beijing City Miyun District No. 2 High School (北京市密云区第二中学)
- Beijing City Miyun District No. 3 High School (北京市密云区第三中学)
- Beijing City Miyun District No. 5 High School (北京市密云区第五中学)
- Beijing City Miyun District No. 6 High School (北京市密云区第六中学)
- Beijing City Miyun District Beizhuang High School (北京市密云区北庄中学)
- Beijing City Miyun District Bulaotun High School (北京市密云区不老屯中学)
- Beijing City Miyun District Dongshaoqu High School (北京市密云区东邵渠中学)
- Beijing City Miyun District Gubeikou High School (北京市密云区古北口中学)
- Beijing City Miyun District Henanzhai High School (北京市密云区河南寨中学)
- Beijing City Miyun District Jugezhuang High School (北京市密云区巨各庄中学)
- Beijing City Miyun District Mujiayu High School (北京市密云区穆家峪中学)
- Beijing City Miyun District Shilibao High School (北京市密云区十里堡中学)
- Beijing City Miyun District Taishizhuang High School (北京市密云区太师庄中学)
- Beijing City Miyun District Xinchengzi High School (北京市密云区新城子中学)
- Beijing City Miyun District Xinnongcun High School (北京市密云区新农村中学)
- Beijing City Miyun District Xitiangezhuang High School (北京市密云区西田各庄中学)
- Beijing City Miyun District Vocational School (北京市密云区职业学校)
- Beijing City Miyun District Special Education School (北京市密云区特殊教育学校)
- Beijing City Miyun Reservoir High School (北京市密云水库中学)
- Beijing Normal University Miyun Experimental High School (北京师范大学密云实验中学)
- Beijing Yuying School (北京市育英学校) - Miyun Branch School (密云分校)
- Capital Normal University Affiliated Miyun High School (首都师范大学附属密云中学)
- Middle School Affiliated to Beijing Jiaotong University (北方交通大学附属中学) - Miyun School (密云分校)

== Primary schools ==
- Miyun District No. 3 Primary School
- Miyun District No. 2 Primary School (密云区第二小学)
- Beijing International English School (BIES) (北京国际英语学校)
- The British School of Beijing (BSB) - Miyun Campus (北京英国学校（BSB）-密云校区)
- Yew Chung International School of Beijing (YCIS) (北京耀中国际学校YCIS）
- Beijing Miyun Bulaotun Town Central Primary School (北京市密云不老屯镇中心小学)
- Beijing Miyun Beizhuang Town Central Primary School (北京市密云北庄镇中心小学)
- Beijing Miyun Bulaotun Town Central Primary School (北京市密云县不老屯镇中心小学)
- Beijing Miyun Dachengzi School (北京密云大城子学校)
- Beijing Miyun Fengjiayu Town Central Primary School (北京密云冯家峪镇中心小学)
- Beijing Miyun No.5 Primary School (Minority Primary School) (北京市密云县第五小学（民族小学）)
- Beijing Miyun No.6 Elementary School (北京市密云县第六小学)
- Beijing Miyun No.7 Primary School (北京市密云第七小学)
- Beijing Miyun Orchard Primary School (北京市密云县果园小学)
- Beijing Miyun Special Education School (北京市密云特殊教育学校)
- Beijing Miyun Taishitun Town Central Primary School (北京市密云县太师屯镇中心小学)
- Beijing Miyun Tanying Manchu Mongolian Township Central Primary School (北京市密云县谭营满族蒙古族乡中心小学)
- Beijing Miyun Vocational School (北京市密云职业学校)
- Beijing Miyun Xinchengzi Town Central Primary School (北京市密云县新城子镇中心小学)
