= Beijing No. 8 High School =

- 北京市第八中学
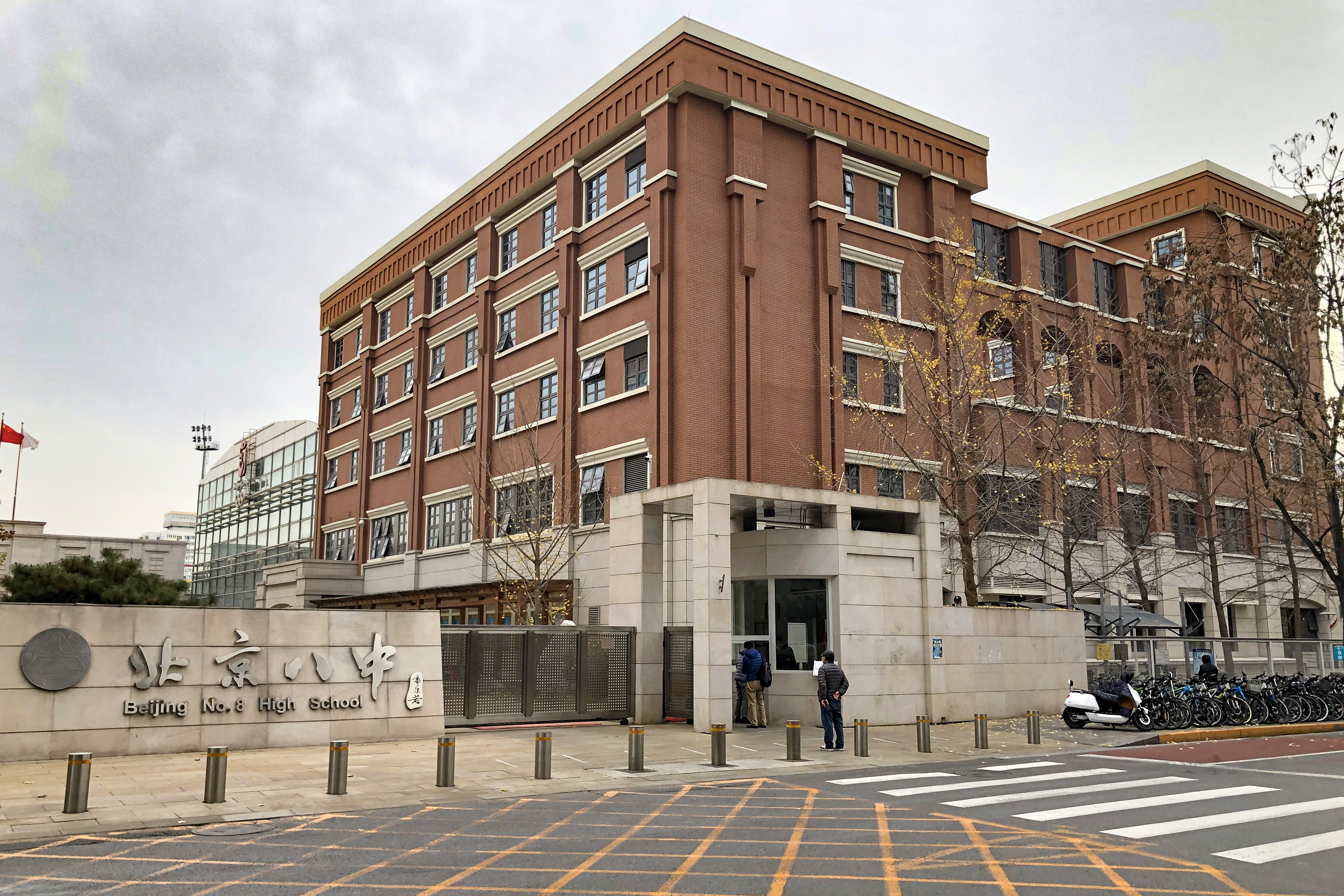
- Xicheng, Beijing; China

Information
- Type: Public School
- Motto: 勤奋进取, 和谐致美 (Diligence, Enterprise, Harmony, Beauty)
- Established: 1921
- Campus: Urban, 60,000 square metres (15 acres)
- Website: no8ms.bj.cn

Beijing No. 8 High School (北京市第八中学) is a public secondary school in Xicheng, Beijing, China. The school is supervised by the Beijing City Xicheng District Education Committee.

In 1949, the private Sicun Middle School (私立四存中学) and the Peking Municipal No. 8 Secondary School (北平市立第八中学) merged to form the Beijing No. 8 High School.

== Alumni ==
- Deng Jiaxian, scientist
- Zhou Xiaochuan, 11th Governor of the People's Bank of China
- Jia Chunwang, Procurator–General of the Supreme People's Procuratorate
- Chen Xiaolu, child of Chen Yi
- Peng Zhao (special class for gifted youths), CEO of Citadel Securities
- Jiaqi Huang (special class for gifted youths), youngest student of Tsinghua University class of 2020, great-grandchild of Ministry of Foreign Affairs Vice-Minister Huang Zhen, grandnephew of State Councilor Dai Bingguo

== See also ==
- List of schools in Xicheng, Beijing
