= Beijing Jingshan School =

- 北京景山学校
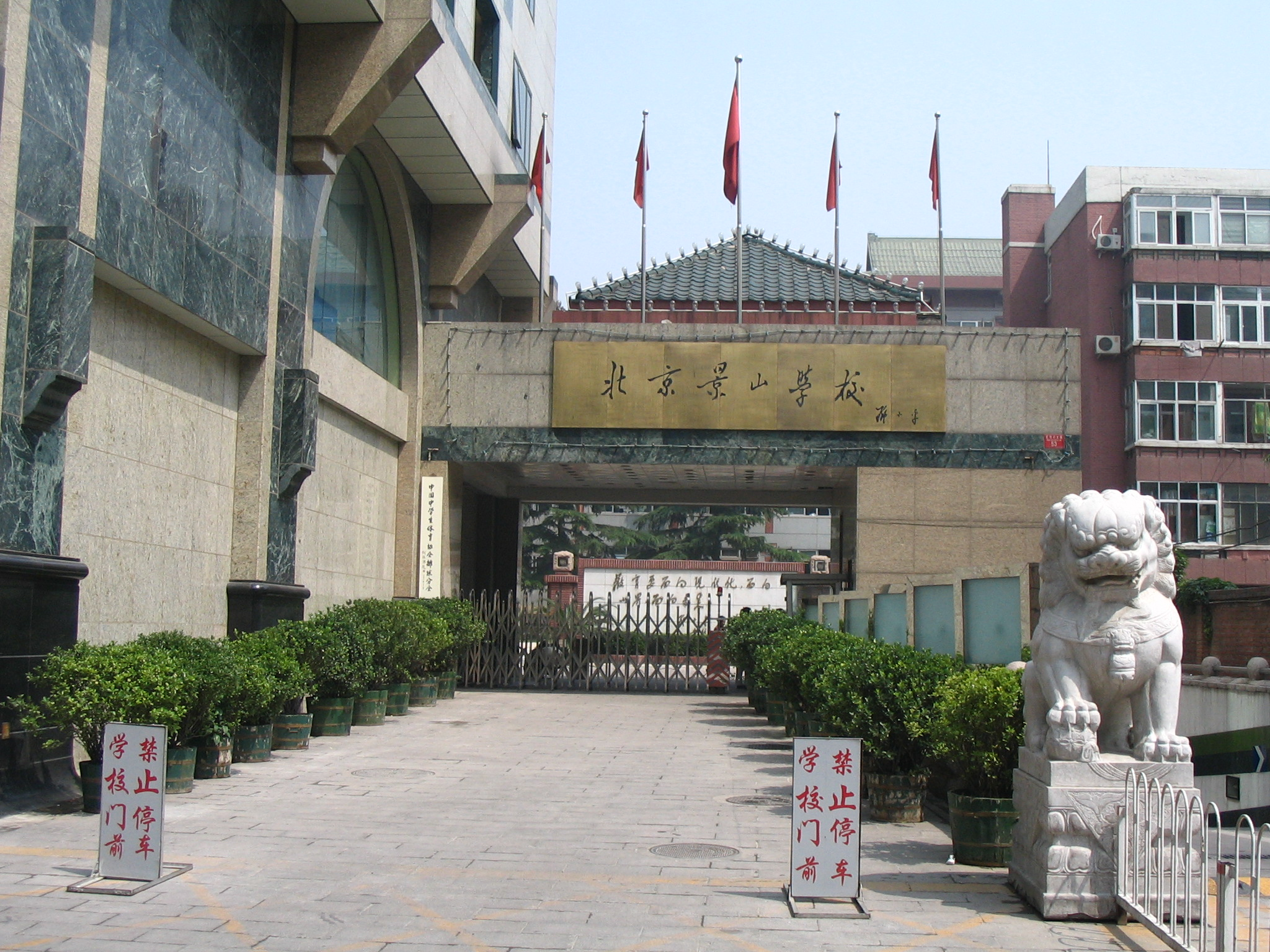

Location
- No.53, Dengshikou Street; Dongcheng; Beijing, China, 100006

Information
- Type: Public
- Established: 1960

Beijing Jingshan School (Chinese: 北京景山学校; pinyin: Běijīng Jǐngshān Xuéxiào) is a public K–12 school in Dongcheng, Beijing, China. The school is supervised by the Beijing City Dongcheng District Education Committee.
