= List of schools in Chaoyang, Beijing =

This is a list of schools in Chaoyang District, Beijing.

== Secondary schools ==
Note: In China the word 中学 zhōngxué, literally translated as "middle school", refers to any secondary school and differs from the American usage of the term "middle school" to mean specifically a lower secondary school or junior high school. 初中 chūzhōng is used to refer to a lower secondary school.

- Beijing City Chaoyang District Aidi Foreign Language School (北京市朝阳区爱迪外国语学校)
- Beijing City Chaoyang District Anhua High School (北京市朝阳区安华学校)
- Beijing City Chaoyang District Anmin School (北京市朝阳区安民学校) - Ligezhuang Campus (黎各庄校区)
- Beijing City Chaoyang District Education Research Center Affiliated School (北京市朝阳区教育研究中心附属学校) - Main Campus and Branch Campus (分部)
- Beijing City Chaoyang District Fangcaodi International School (北京市朝阳区芳草地国际学校) - Fuli Branch School (富力分校) and Ganluyuan Branch School (甘露园分校)
- Beijing City Chaoyang Foreign Language School (北京市朝阳外国语学校) - Beiyuan Branch School (北苑分校)
- Beijing City Chuiyangliu High School (北京市垂杨柳中学)
- Beijing City Dongfang Decai School (北京市东方德才学校)
- Beijing CBD Experimental School (北京市中央商务区实验学校) - Secondary School Division (中学部)
- Beijing City Gaojiayuan High School (北京市高家园中学)
- Beijing City Heizhuanghu High School (北京市黑庄户中学)
- Beijing City Heping Road No. 1 High School (北京市和平街第一中学) - Main Campus, Chaolai Campus (朝来校区), Lianpayuan Campus (莲葩园校区)
- Beijing City Huaqiaocheng Huanggang High School (北京市华侨城黄冈中学) - Cuicheng Campus (翠成校区), Fatou Campus (垡头校区), and Huaqiaocheng Campus (华侨城校区)
- Beijing City Hujialou High School (北京市呼家楼中学)
- Beijing Chen Jing Lun High School - Headquarters Junior High School (本部初中), Headquarters Senior High School (本部高中), Baoli Branch School (保利分校), Chongshi Branch School (崇实分校), Dijing Branch School (帝景分校), Jinsong Branch School (劲松分校), and New Education Experimental Branch School (新教育实验分校)
- Beijing Chen Jing Lun High School Branch School (分校) - Donghuwan Campus (东湖湾校区) and Nanhudongyuan Campus (南湖东园校区)
- Beijing Chen Jing Lun High School Jiaming Branch School (嘉铭分校) - Main Campus and Oulun Campus (欧陆校区)
- Beijing City Jinsong Vocational Senior High School (北京市劲松职业高中) - Comprehensive Senior High School Section (综合高中部), Changying Campus (常营校区), Jinsong Campus (劲松校区), and Shuanglong Campus (双龙校区)
- Beijing City Louzizhuang High School (北京市楼梓庄中学)
- Beijing City No. 2 High School (北京市第二中学) - Chaoyang School (朝阳学校)
- Beijing City No. 16 High School (北京市第十六中学)
- Beijing City No. 17 High School (北京市第十七中学) - Gaobeidian Campus (高碑店校区)
- Beijing City No. 71 High School (北京市第七十一中学)
- Beijing City No. 80 High School (北京市第八十中学)
- Beijing City Qiushi Occupational School (北京市求实职业学校) - Airport Campus (机场校区), Anzhenli Campus (安贞里校区), Tuanjiehu Campus (团结湖校区) Part 1 (一部) and Part 2 (二部), Wangjing Campus (望京校区), and Yayuncun Campus (亚运村校区)
- Beijing City Private Xinya School (北京市私立新亚中学)
- Beijing City Runfeng School (北京市润丰学校)
- Beijing City Sanlitun No. 1 High School (北京市三里屯一中) - Baiziyuan Campus (百子园校区), Sanlitun Campus (三里屯校区), and Xingfu Branch Campus (幸福村校区)
- Beijing City Shibalidian High School (北京市十八里店中学)
- Beijing City Tuanjiehu No. 3 High School (北京市团结湖第三中学) - High school division (高中部)
- Beijing City Yinghuayuan Experimental School (北京市樱花园实验学校)
- Beijing City Zhongde School (北京市忠德学校)
- Beijing Education College Chaoyang Branch Institution Affiliated School (北京教育学院朝阳分院附属学校)
- Beijing Electrical Engineering School (北京市电气工程学校) - Ganluyuan Campus (甘露园校区), Guanzhuang Campus (管庄校区), and Jiangtai Road Campus (将台路校区)
- Beijing High School (北京中学)
- Beijing International Studies University Affiliated High School (北京第二外国语学院附属中学) - Main Campus and Headquarters Branch Guangzhuang Campus (中学本部（管庄校区）), and Yangzha Campus (杨闸校区)
- Beijing Jingshan School - Chaoyang School (朝阳学校)
- Beijing Normal University Sanfan High School (北京师范大学三帆中学) - Chaoyang School (朝阳学校)
- Beijing Ritan High School - Junior High School Division (初中部), Senior High School Division (高中部), Dongrun Branch School (东润分校)
- Beijing Ritan High School Experimental School (实验学校) - Chenguang Campus (实验学校晨光校区) and West Campus (西校区)
- Beijing Jingsong No. 1 High School (北京市劲松第一中学)
- Beijing No. 80 High School Experimental School (北京市第八十中学实验学校) - Wenyuhe Branch Campus - (温榆河分校 )
- Beijing University of Technology Experimental School (北京工业大学实验学校} - North Campus (北校区) and South Campus (南校区)
- Capital Normal University Affiliated Experimental School (首都师范大学附属实验学校) - Main Campus, Huaxi Campus (花西校区), and Xiyuan Campus (西园校区)
- Central Academy of Fine Arts Affiliated Experimental School (中央美术学院附属实验学校) - Two campuses
- China Education Science Research Institute Chaoyang Experimental School (中国教育科学研究院朝阳实验学校)
- Communication University of China Affiliated High School (中国传媒大学附属中学)
- High School Attached to Beijing University of Technology - Shoucheng Campus (首城校区) and Shuangqiao Campus (双桥分校)
- High School Attached to Northeast Normal University - Chaoyang School (朝阳学校)
- Tsinghua University High School - Chaoyang School (朝阳学校)
- University of International Business and Economics Affiliated Secondary School (对外经济贸易大学附属中学) - Beijing No. 94 High School

== Primary schools ==
- Beijing City Chaoyang District Aidi Foreign Language School (北京市朝阳区爱迪外国语学校)
- Beijing City Chaoyang District Anhua School (北京市朝阳区安华学校)
- Beijing City Chaoyang District Anmin School (北京市朝阳区安民学校) - Ligezhuang Campus (黎各庄校区)
- Beijing City Chaoyang District Fang Cao Di International School (北京市朝阳区芳草地国际学校) Fuli Branch School (富力分校)
- Beijing City Chaoyang Foreign Language School Beiyuan Branch School (北苑分校)
- Beijing City Heping Road No. 1 Secondary School (北京市和平街第一中学)
- Beijing City Runfeng School (北京市润丰学校)
- Beijing City Sanlitun No. 1 High School (北京市三里屯一中) - Baiziyuan Campus (百子园校区)
- Beijing City Yinghuayuan Experimental School (北京市樱花园实验学校)
- Beijing City Zhongde School (北京市忠德学校)
- Beijing Chen Jing Lun High School Baoli Branch School (保利分校), Chongshi Branch School (北京市陈经纶中学崇实分校), Dijing Branch School (帝景分校), Jinsong Branch School (劲松分校), and New Education Experimental School (新教育实验分校)
- Beijing Chen Jing Lun High School Jiaming Branch School (嘉铭分校) - Main campus and Oulu Campus (欧陆校区)
- Beijing Chen Jing Lun High School Branch School (北京市陈经纶中学分校) - Donghuwan Campus (东湖湾校区) and Nanhudongyuan Campus (南湖东园校区)
- Beijing CBD Experimental School (北京市中央商务区实验学校) - Primary School Division (小学部)
- Beijing Education Institution Chaoyang Branch Institution Affiliated School (北京教育学院朝阳分院附属学校)
- Beijing High School (北京中学)
- Beijing International Studies University Affiliated Secondary School Primary School Branch (北京第二外国语学院附属中学小学部) - Baliqiao Campus (八里桥校区) and Ruixiang Minzu Campus (瑞祥民族校区)
- Beijing Jingshan School Chaoyang School (朝阳学校)
- Beijing Normal University Sanfan High School (北京师范大学三帆中学) Chaoyang School (朝阳学校)
- Beijing Ritan High School Dongrun Branch School (东润分校) and West Campus (西校区)
- Beijing Ritan High School Experimental School (北京市日坛中学实验学校) - Chenguang Campus (晨光校区)
- Capital Normal University Affiliated Experimental School (首都师范大学附属实验学校) - Main Campus, Huaxi Campus (花西校区), and Xiyuan Campus (西园校区)
- Central Academy of Fine Arts Affiliated Experimental School (中央美术学院附属实验学校)
- China Education Research Institute Chaoyang Experimental School (中国教育科学研究院朝阳实验学校)
- High School Attached to Beijing University of Technology Shoucheng Campus (首城校区)

== International schools ==
- Western Academy of Beijing
- Beanstalk International Bilingual School Upper East Side and Dongrun
- Beijing BISS International School
- Beijing Ritan High School
- British School of Beijing, Sanlitun
- Beijing City International School
- Canadian International School of Beijing
- Deutsche Botschaftsschule Peking (German Embassy School)
- Harrow International School Beijing
- Japanese School of Beijing
- Korean International School in Beijing
- Lycée Français International Charles de Gaulle de Pékin (French International School)
- Pakistan Embassy College Beijing
- Yew Chung International School of Beijing

Former campuses

- Dulwich College Beijing Beijing Riviera Campus
