= Tuanjiehu Subdistrict =

Tuanjiehu Subdistrict 团结湖街道
- Subdistrict
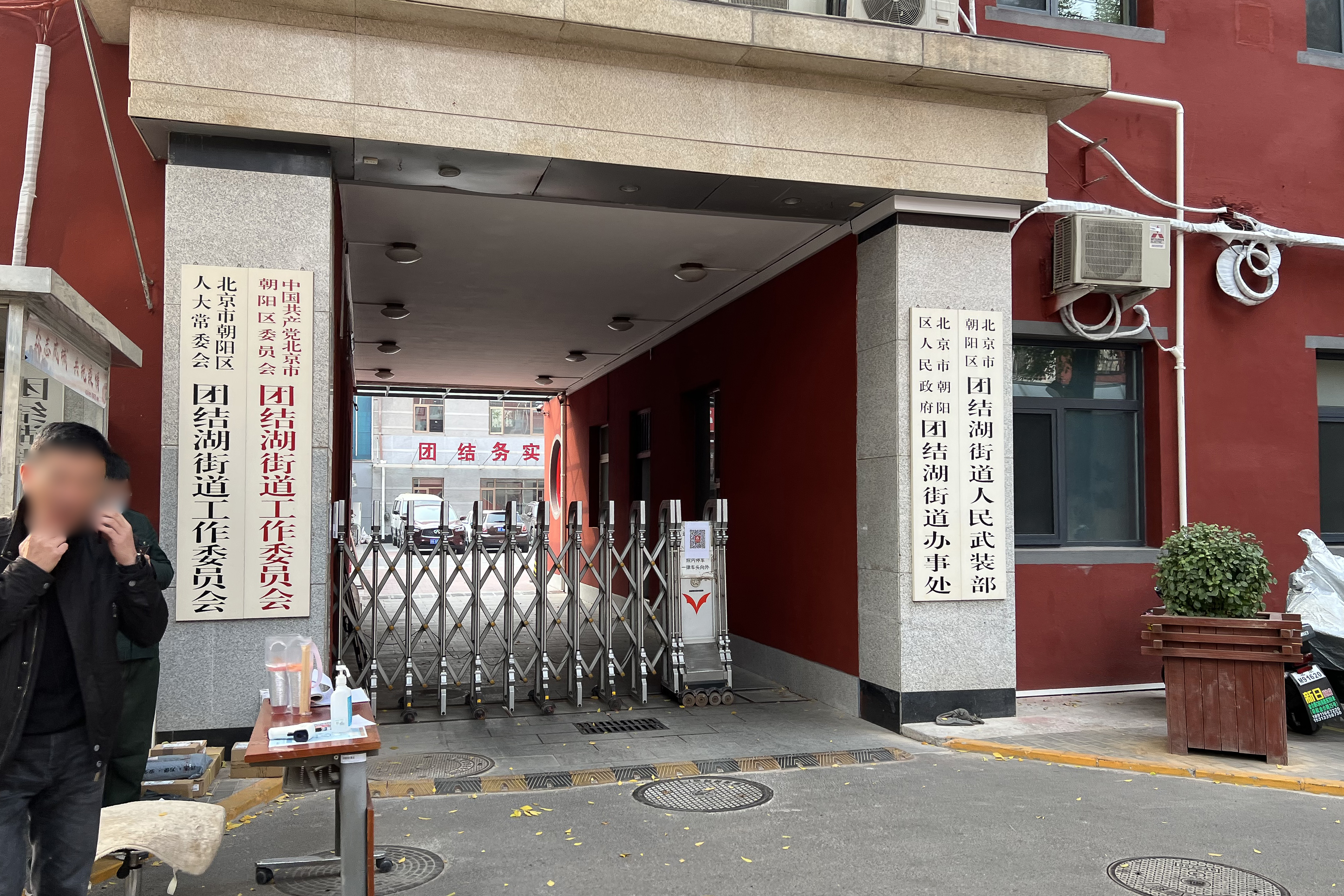
- Tuanjiehu Subdistrict Office, 2022

- Location within Beijing Location within China
- Coordinates: 39°55′49″N 116°27′28″E
- Country: China
- Municipality: Beijing
- District: Chaoyang

Area
  - Total: 1.23 km^{2} (0.47 sq mi)

Population (2020)
  - Total: 32,091
  - Density: 26,100/km^{2} (67,600/sq mi)
- Time zone: UTC+8 (China Standard)
- Postal code: 100026
- Area code: 010

Tuanjiehu Subdistrict (Chinese: 团结湖街道; pinyin: Tuánjiéhú Jiēdào) is a subdistrict on the west portion of Chaoyang District, Beijing, China. As of 2020, it has a total population of 32,091.

The subdistrict was named after Tuanjie Lake (Chinese: 团结湖; lit. 'United Lake'), which in turn was named so because it was created by people all over Chaoyang District working in unison.

== History ==
Timeline of changes in the status of Tuanjiehu Subdistrict
Time	Status	
Ming dynasty	Part of Daxing County	
1947	Part of 1st Suburban District	
1949	Part of East Suburban District	
1958	Part of Chaoyang District	
1959	Western portion was part of Xiaozhuang and Baijiazhuang Production Teams, Gaibeidian Commune	Eastern portion was part of Satong Production Team, Liulitun Production brigade, Xinghuo Commune
1960s	Part of People's Commune of Xiaozhuang Subdistrict	Part of People's Commune of Balizhuang
1970s	Part of Dazhailu Subdistrict	
1979	Created as Tuanjiehu Subdistrict	

== Administrative Division ==
In 2021, there are 6 communities under Tuanjiehu Subdistrict:

Administrative Division Code	Community Name in English	Community Name in Simplified Chinese
110105013027	Yi'ertiao	一二条
110105013028	Sansitiao	三四条
110105013029	Zhonglubei	中路北
110105013030	Zhonglunan	中路南
110105013031	Shuiduizi	水碓子
110105013032	Nanbeili	南北里

== Transport ==
- Tuanjiehu station, near Tuanjiehu Subdistrict Office
- Hujialou station, near Tuanjiehu Park
