= Ying Zou =

Canadian computer scientist

- Education: Beijing Polytechnic University (B.Eng); Chinese Academy of Space Technology (M.Eng); University of Waterloo (Ph.D)
- Known for: Software Engineering; Service Oriented Architecture (SOA)
- Awards: IBM Faculty Award 2014; IBM CAS Research Faculty Fellow of the Year (2007 & 2008)
- Scientific career
- Fields: Computer Engineering; Computer Science
- Workplaces: Queen's University
- Thesis: Techniques and methodologies for the migration of legacy systems to object oriented platforms (2003)

Ying Zou is a Canadian computer scientist. She is a professor in the Department of Electrical and Computer Engineering at Queen's University and a Canada Research Chair (Tier I) in Software Evolution. She was awarded the IBM CAS Research Faculty Fellow of the Year in 2014 and the IBM Faculty Award in 2007 and 2008.

== Education ==
Zou has a Bachelor of Engineering (B.Eng) degree from Beijing Polytechnic University, a Masters of Engineering (M.Eng) degree from the Chinese Academy of Space Technology, and a Ph.D. in Electrical and Computer Engineering from the University of Waterloo.

== Career ==
Zou is a professor and the lead of the Software Evolution and Analytic Lab (SEAL) at Queen's University.

Her research interest includes Software Engineering, Software Evolution, Software Analytics, Software Empirical Studies and Service Oriented Architecture (SOA).
