= Agricultural Exhibition Center station =

Beijing Subway station

Coordinates: 39°56′29″N 116°27′42″E

Agricultural Exhibition Center 农业展览馆
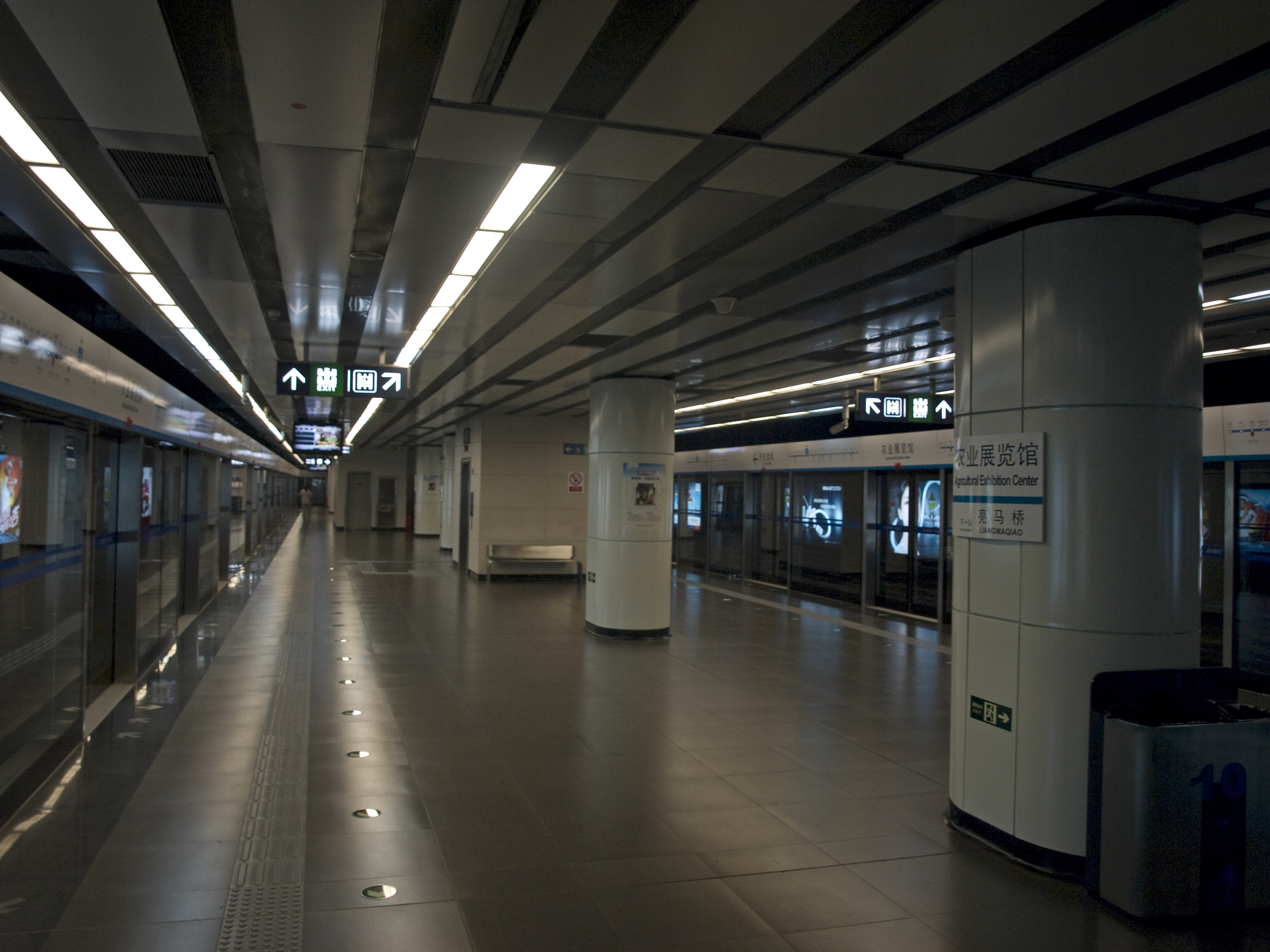
- Platform

General information
- Location: East 3rd Ring Road North and Dongzhimen Outer Street (东直门外大街); Chaoyang District, Beijing; China
- Operator: Beijing Mass Transit Railway Operation Corporation Limited
- Line: Line 10
- Platforms: 2 (1 island platform)
- Tracks: 2

Construction
- Structure type: Underground
- Accessible: Yes

History
- Opened: July 19, 2008

Services
Preceding station	Beijing Subway	Following station
Liangmaqiao outer loop / anticlockwise	Line 10	Tuanjiehu inner loop / clockwise
Location
- Location within Beijing

Agricultural Exhibition Center station (simplified Chinese: 农业展览馆站; traditional Chinese: 農業展覽館站; pinyin: Nóngyè Zhǎnlǎnguǎn zhàn) is a subway station on Line 10 of the Beijing Subway in Chaoyang District. It is named after the National Agricultural Exhibition Center.

The station has an underground island platform.

There are 2 exits, lettered A and D. Exit D is accessible.
