= Tuanjiehu station =

Beijing Subway Line 3 and Line 10 station

Tuanjiehu 团结湖
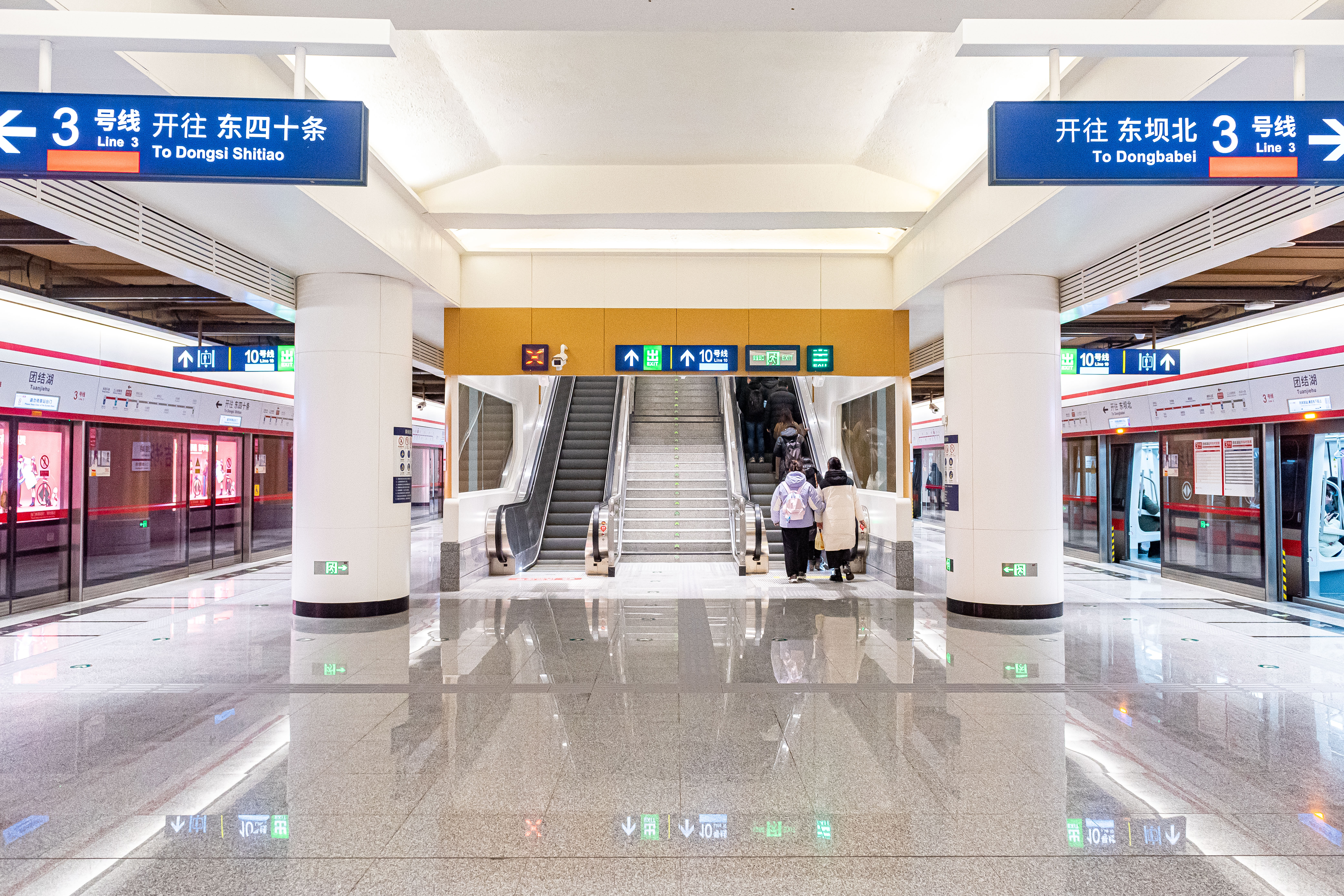
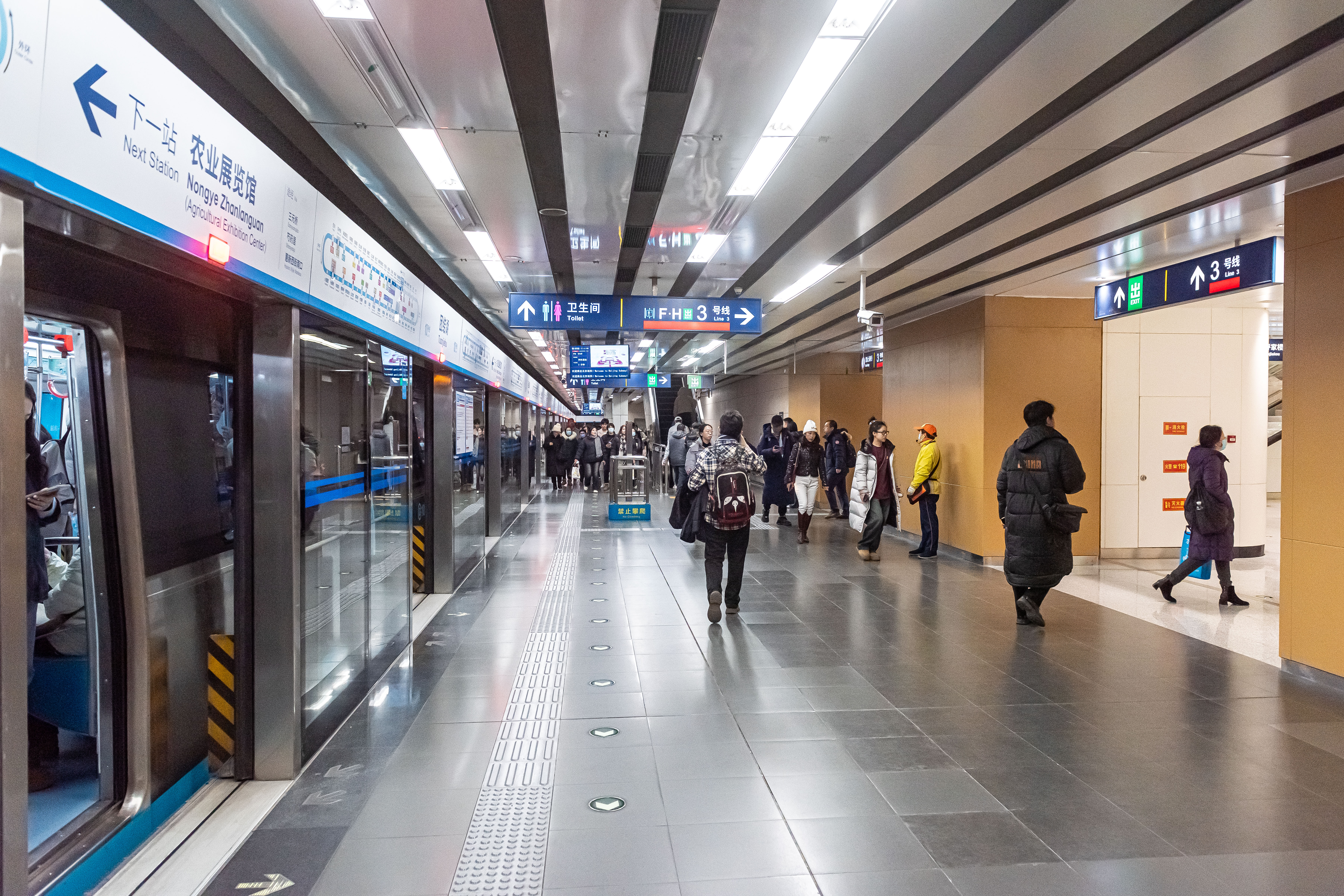
- Line 3 platform Line 10 clockwise platform

General information
- Location: East 3rd Ring Road North and Gongrentiyuchang North Road (工人体育场北路) / Nongzhanguan South Road (农展馆南路); Chaoyang District, Beijing; China
- Coordinates: 39°56′01″N 116°27′43″E
- Operator: Beijing Mass Transit Railway Operation Corporation Limited
- Lines: Line 3; Line 10
- Platforms: 4 (1 split island platform and 1 island platform)
- Tracks: 4

Construction
- Structure type: Underground
- Accessible: Yes

History
- Opened: Line 10: July 19, 2008; 18 years ago; Line 3: December 15, 2024; 20 months ago

Services
Preceding station	Beijing Subway	Following station
Workers' Stadium towards Dongsi Shitiao	Line 3	Chaoyang Park towards Dongbabei
Agricultural Exhibition Center outer loop / anticlockwise	Line 10	Hujialou inner loop / clockwise
Location
- Location within Beijing

Tuanjiehu station (simplified Chinese: 团结湖站; traditional Chinese: 團結湖站; pinyin: Tuánjiéhú zhàn) is a interchange station between Line 3 and Line 10 of the Beijing Subway. The Line 10 station opened on July 19, 2008. The station handled a peak entry and exit traffic of 80,700 people on May 5, 2013. The Line 3 station opened on December 15, 2024.

== Name ==
The station is named after Tuanjiehu Subdistrict. For Tuanjiehu Park (Tuanjie Lake Park), passengers should use Hujialou station.

== Station layout ==
The station has underground island platforms for Line 3 and Line 10.

== Exits ==
=== Line 10 ===
There are 4 exits, lettered A, B, C, and D. Exit C is accessible. Exit A is located on the Northwest side of the station. Exit B, C and D are respectively to the Northeast, Southeast and Southwest of the station.

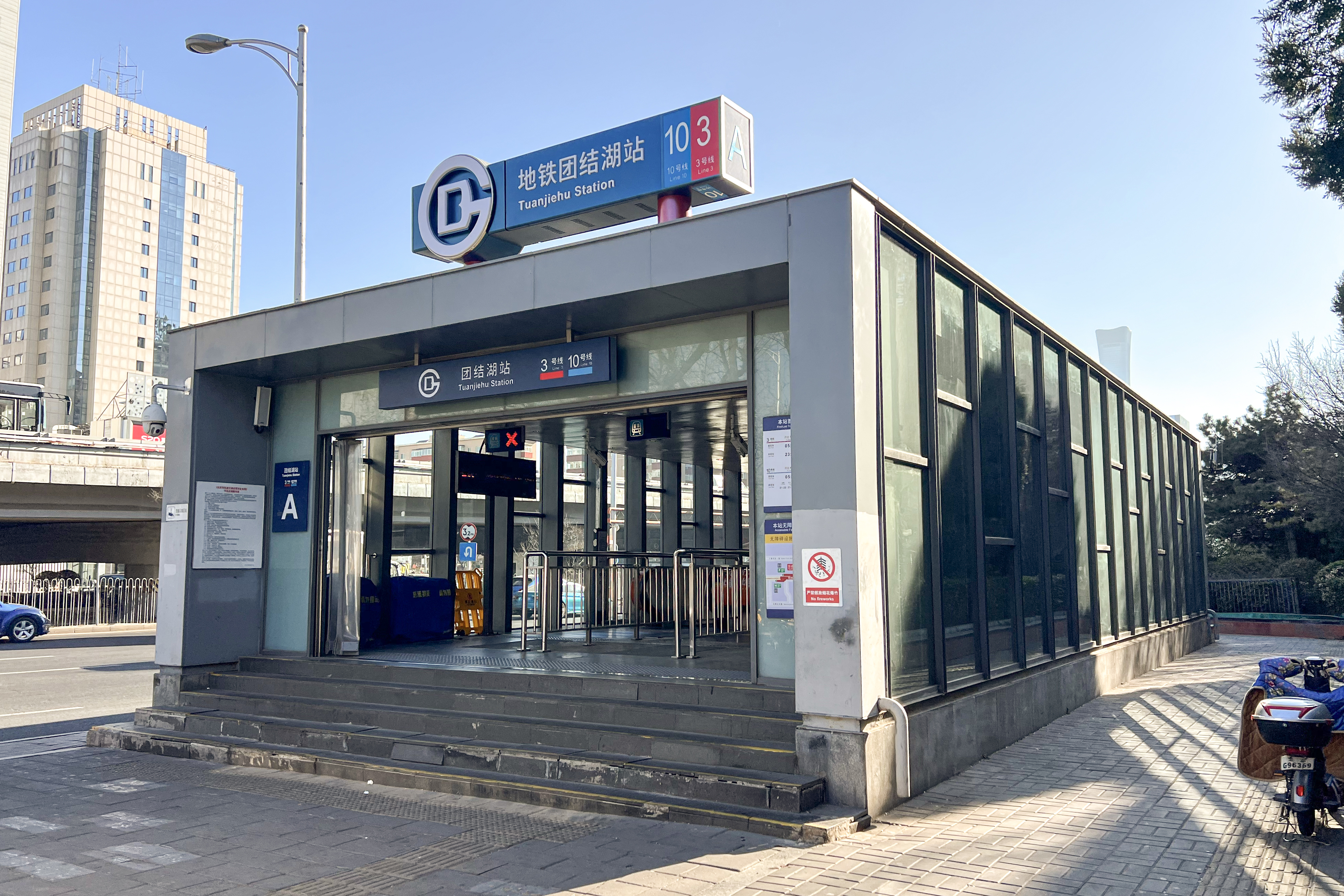
Exit A, Line 10

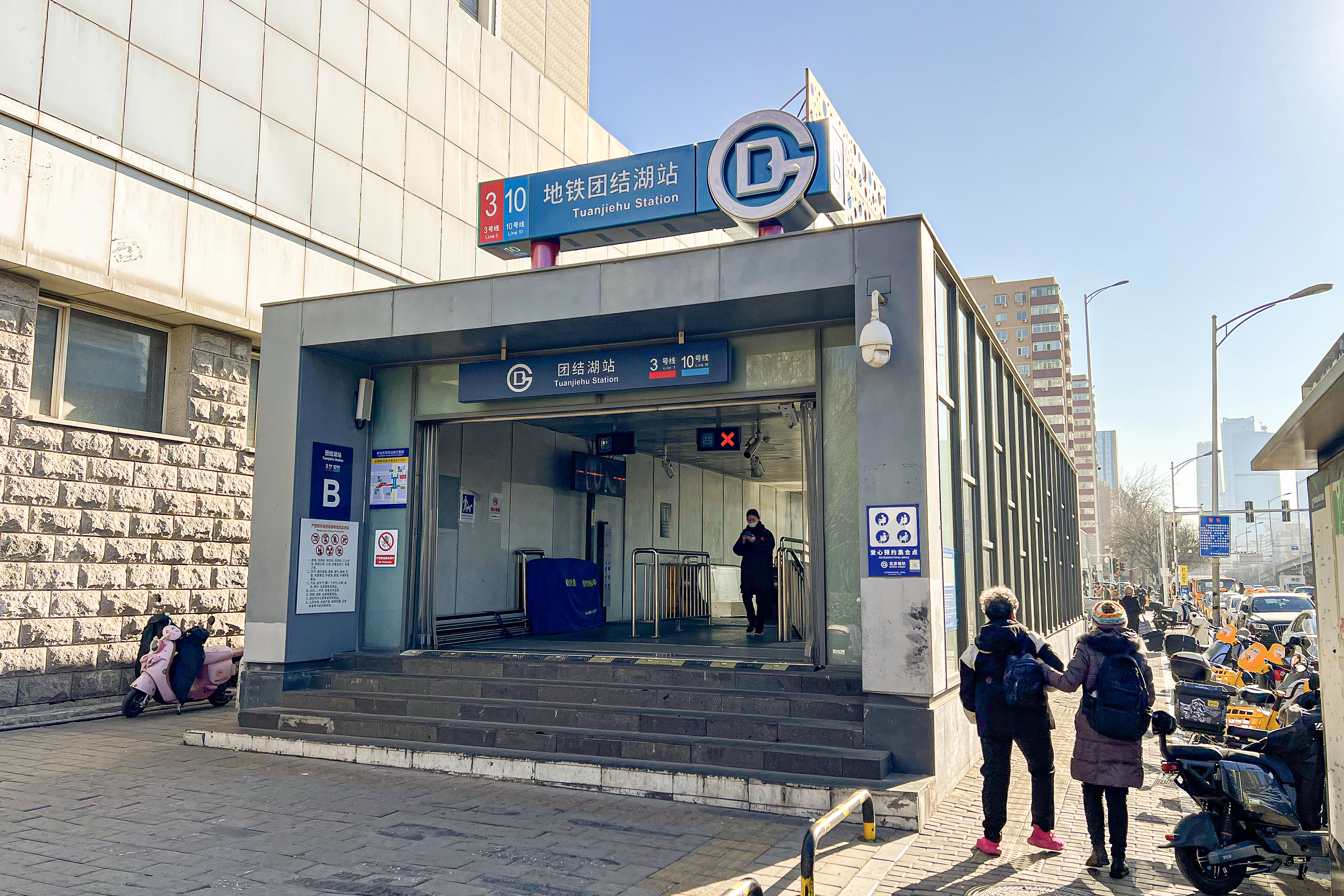
Exit B, Line 10

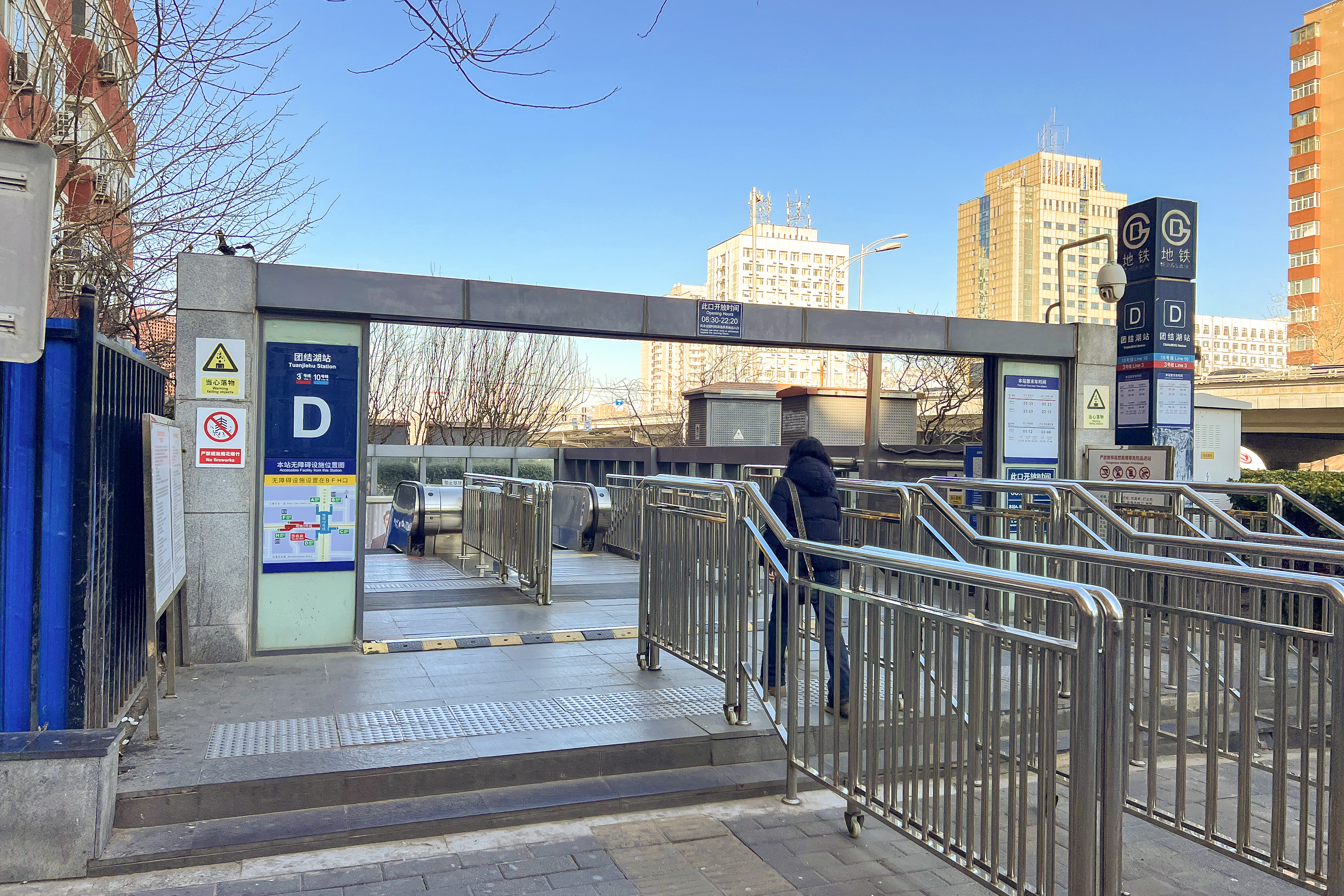
Exit D, Line 10 (only open between 0630 and 2220)

=== Line 3 ===
There are 2 exits, lettered F and H. Both have accessible elevators.

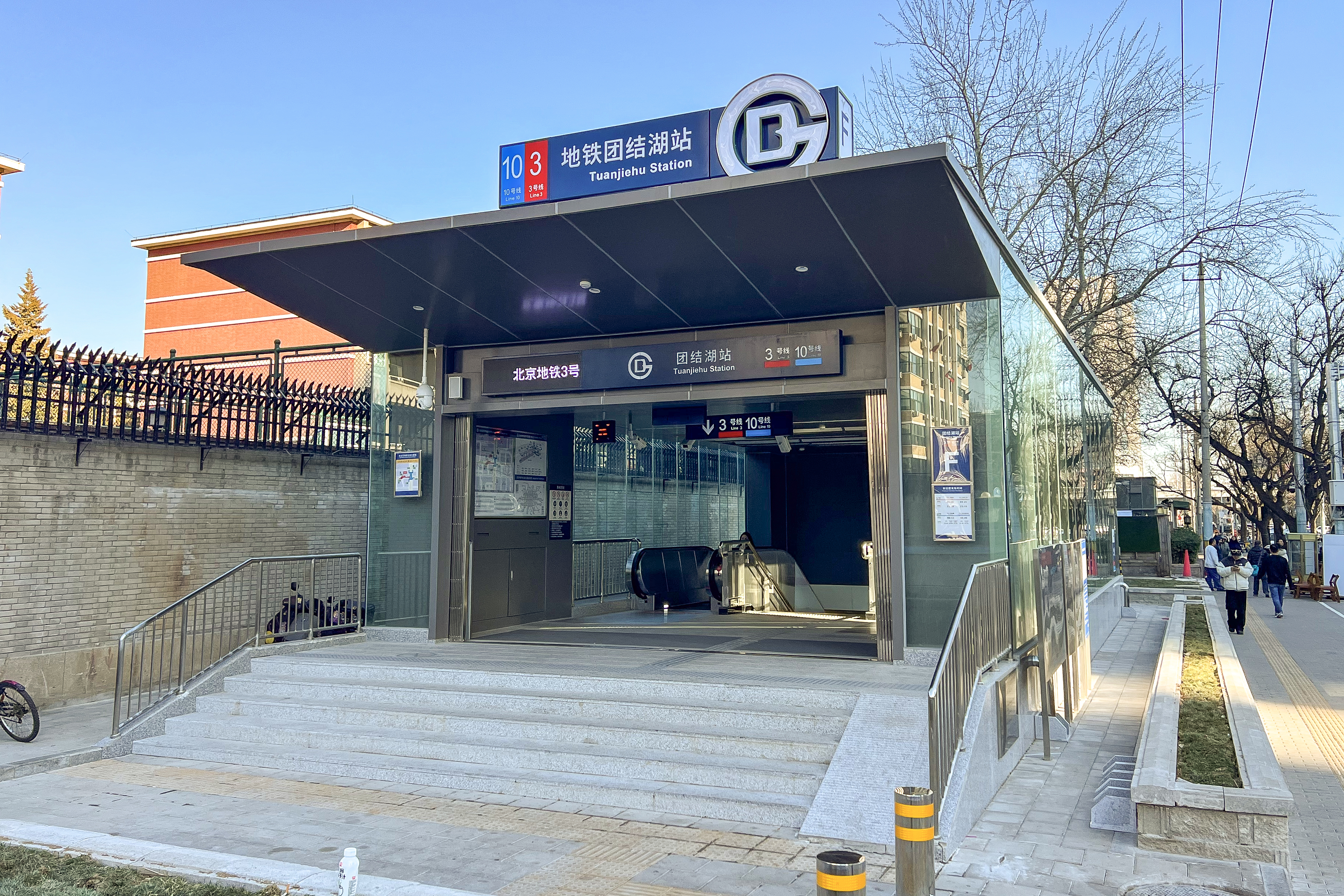
Exit F, Line 3

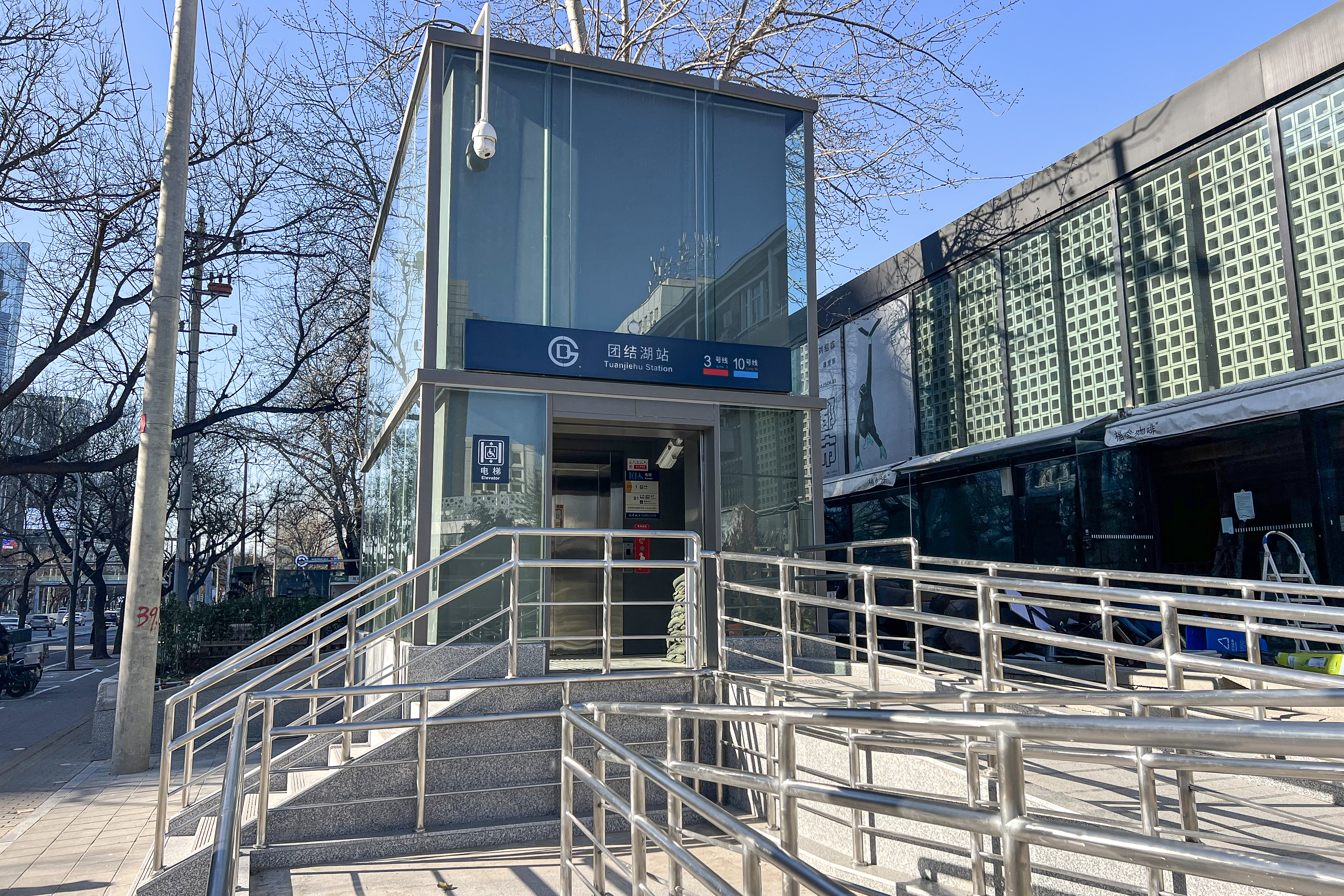
Exit F accessible exit

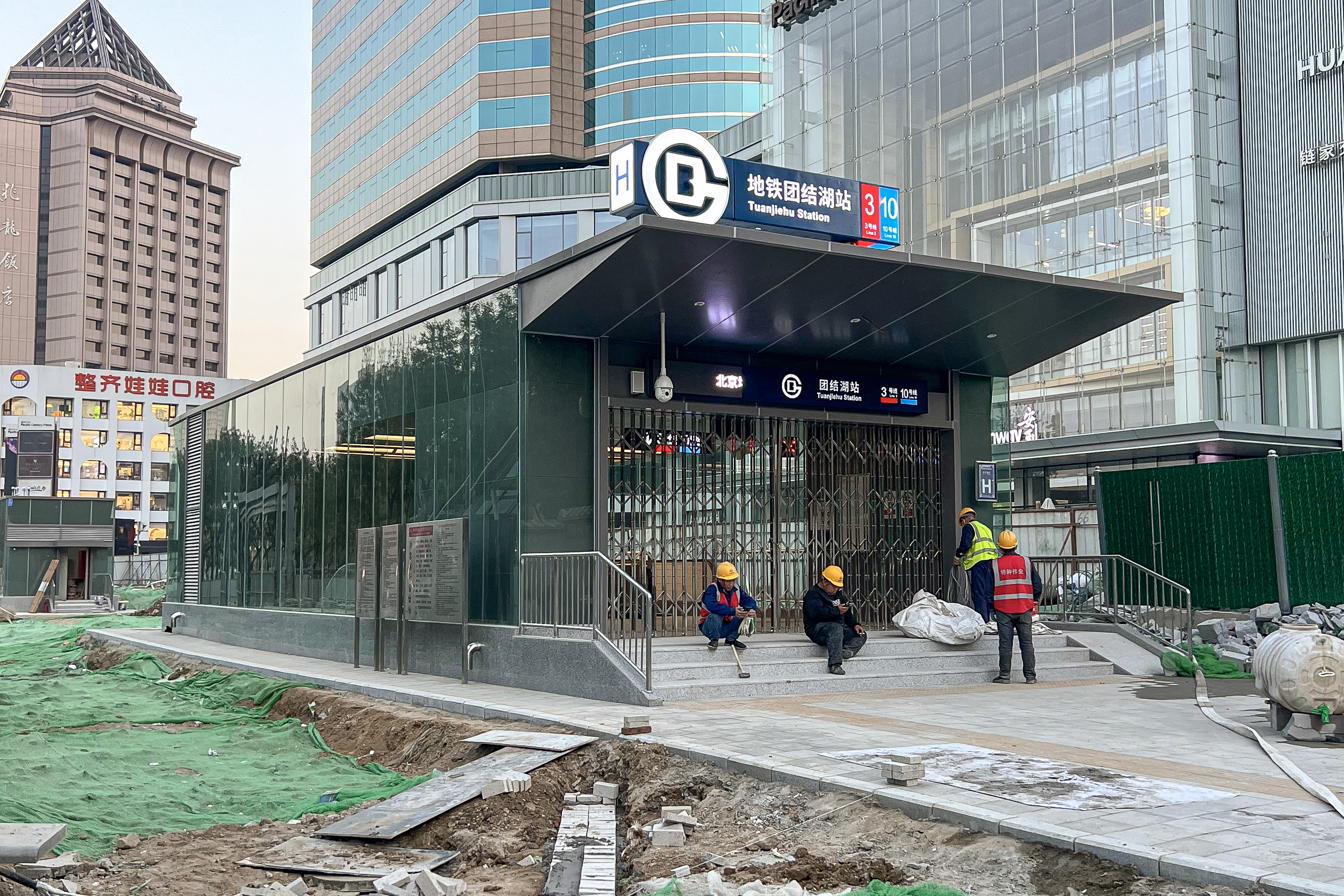
Exit H, Line 3

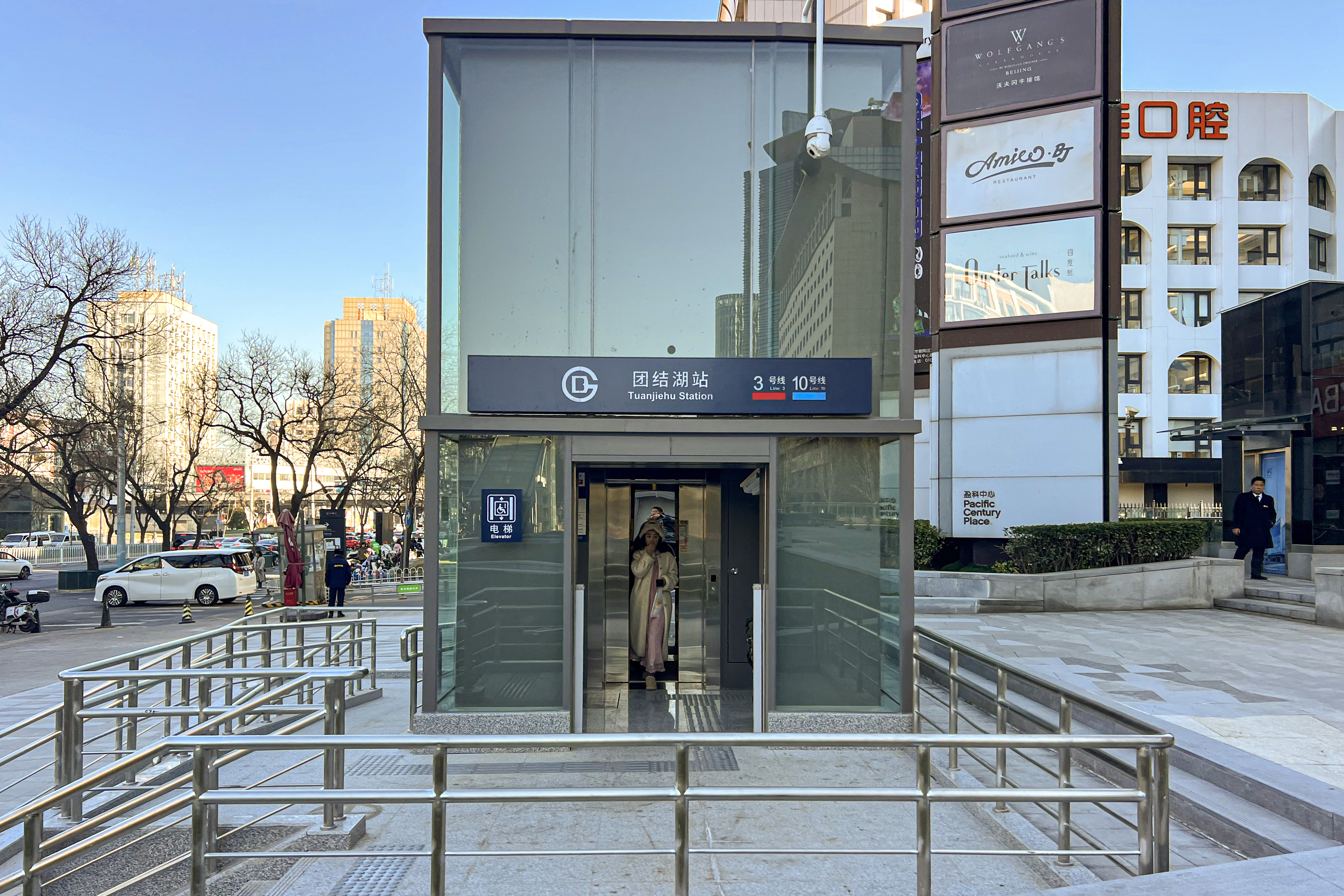
Exit H accessible exit

== Gallery ==
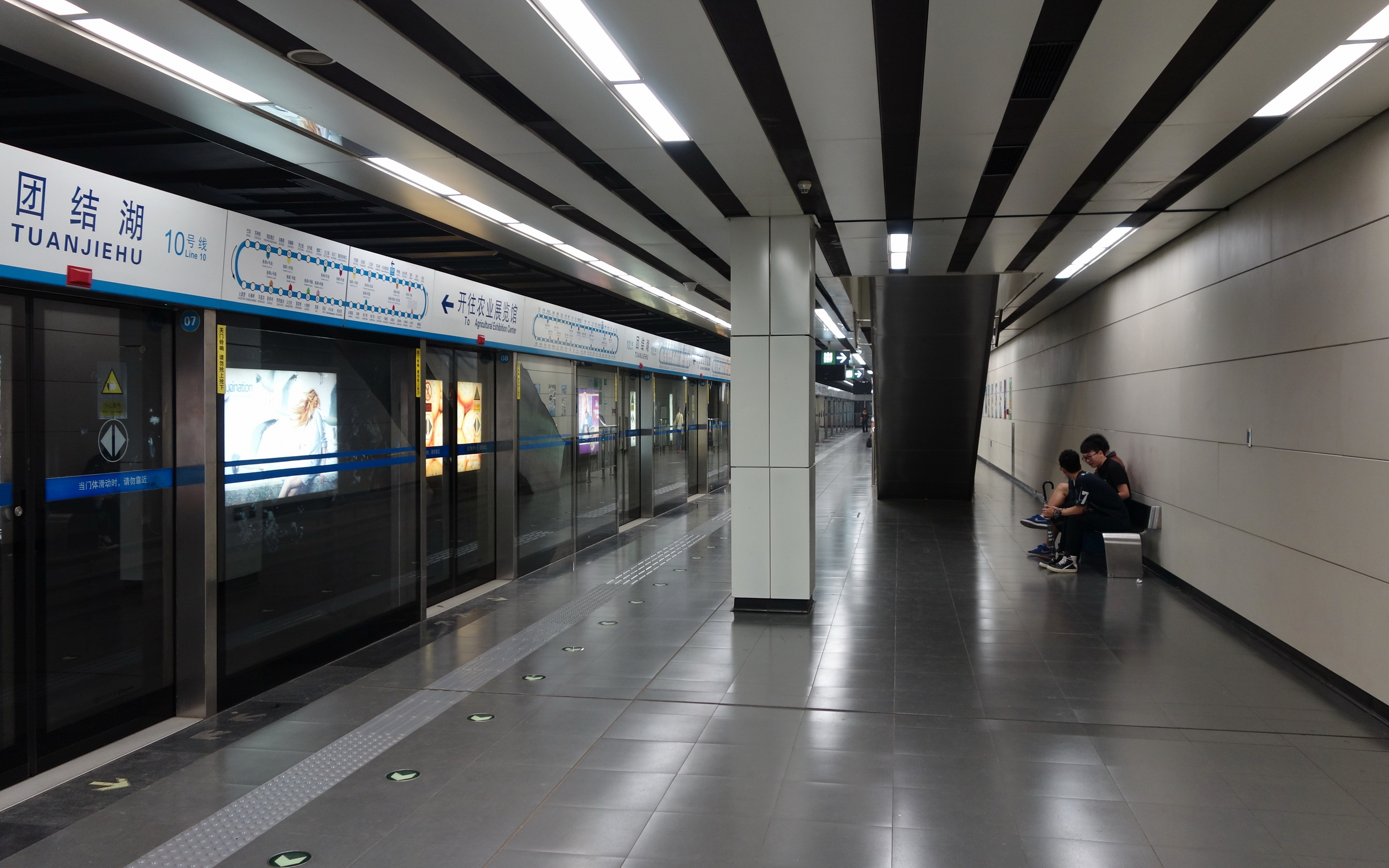
Counter-clockwise platform (June 2013)

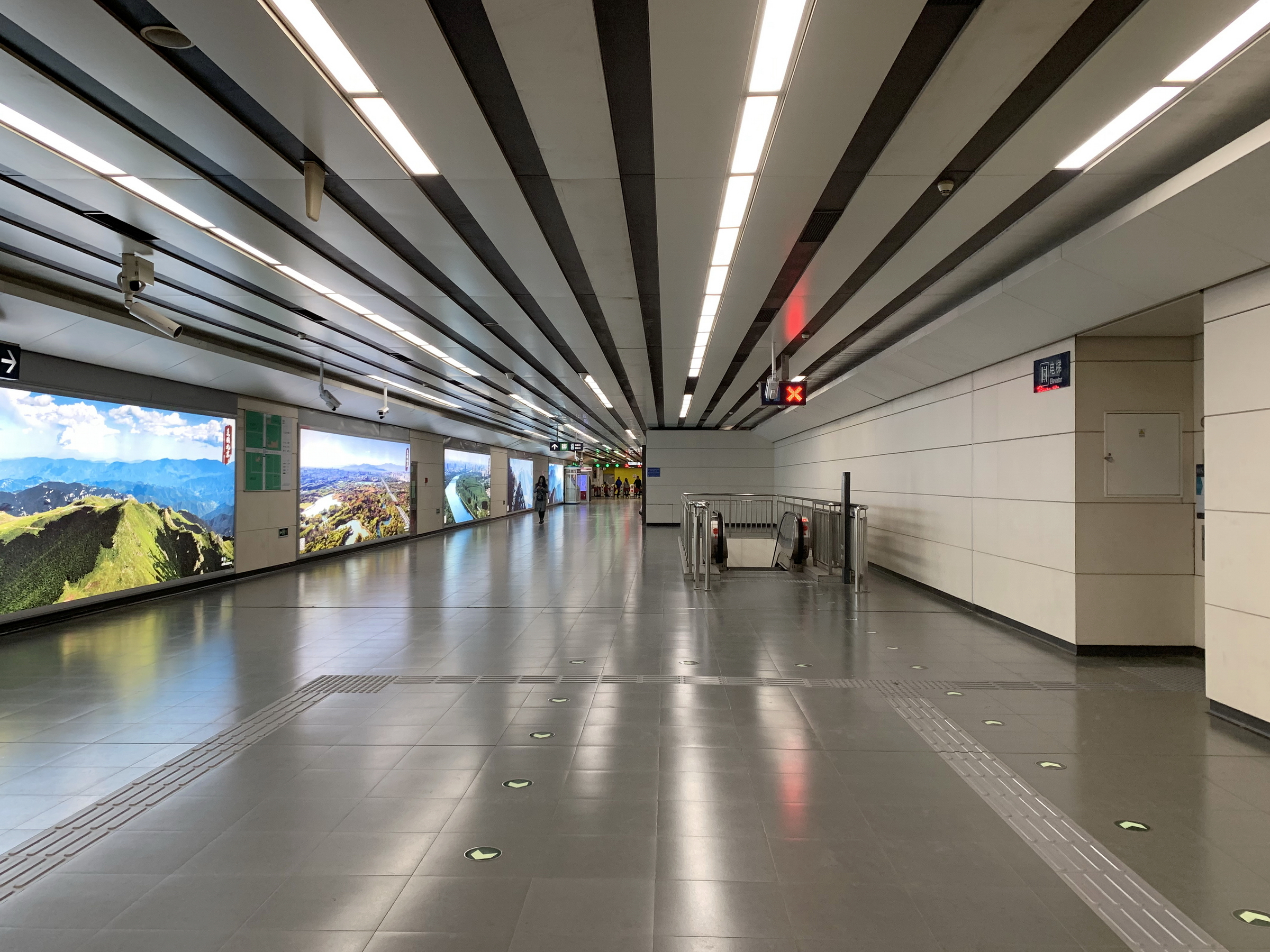
Station Hall

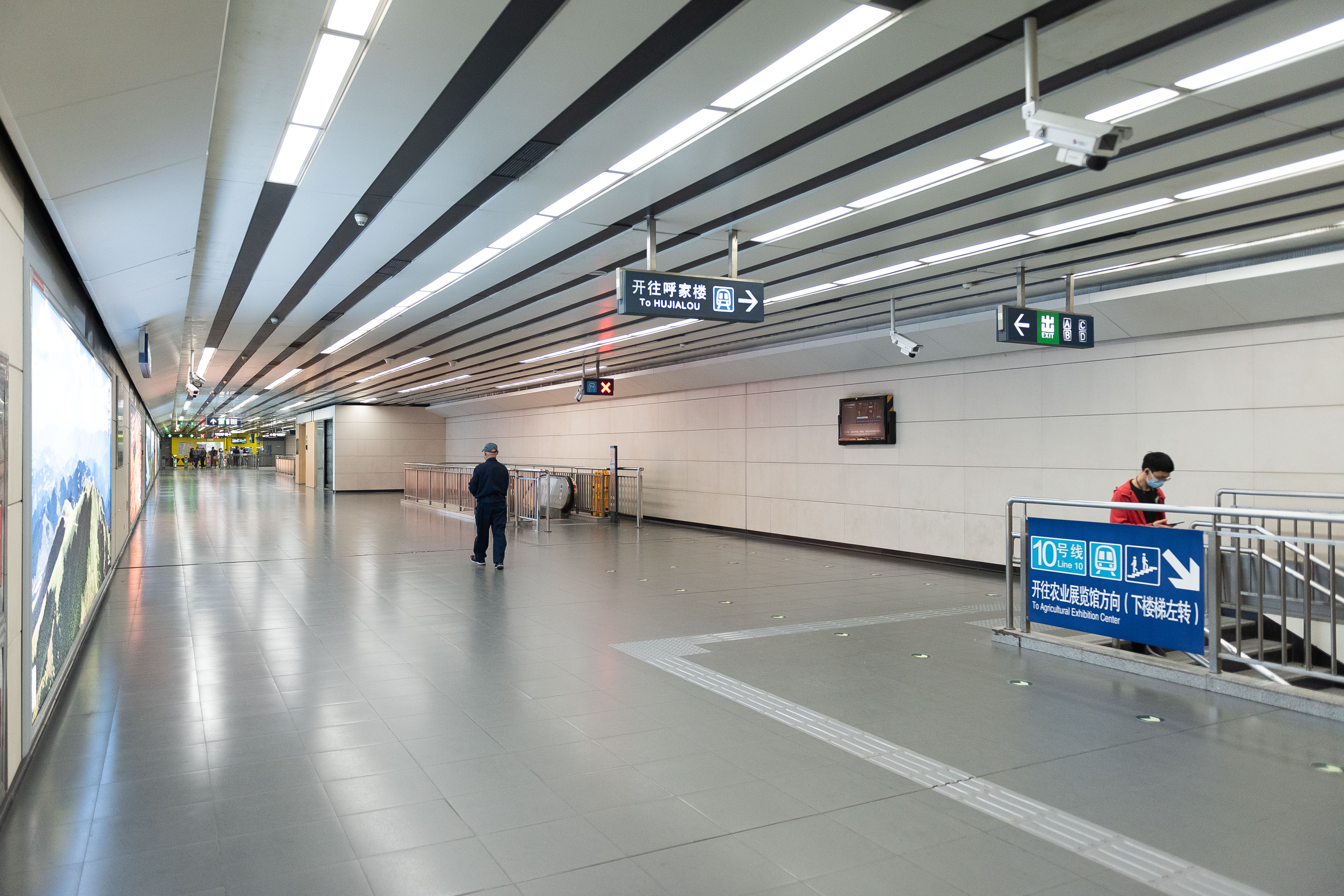
West concourse

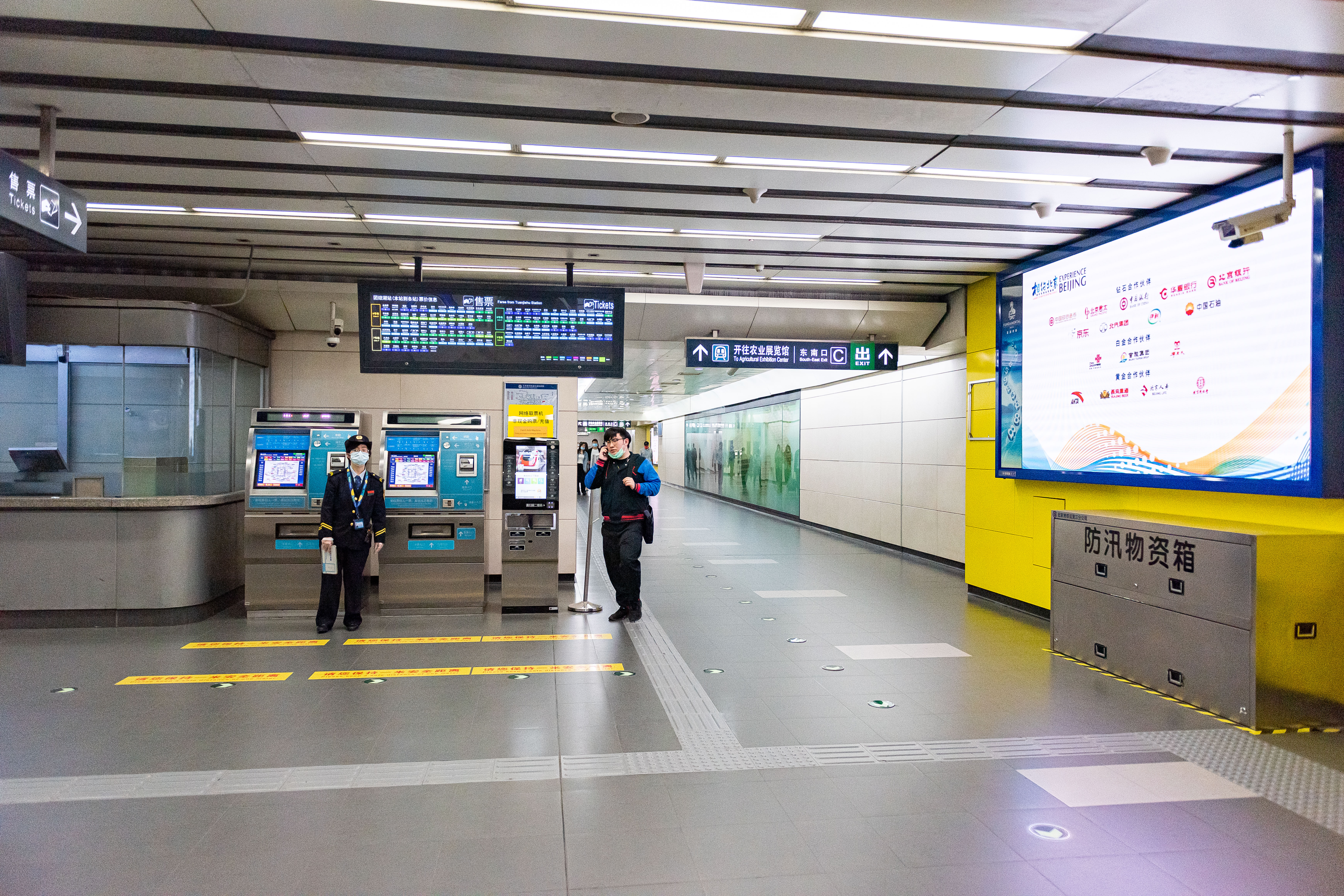
Southwest ticket hall

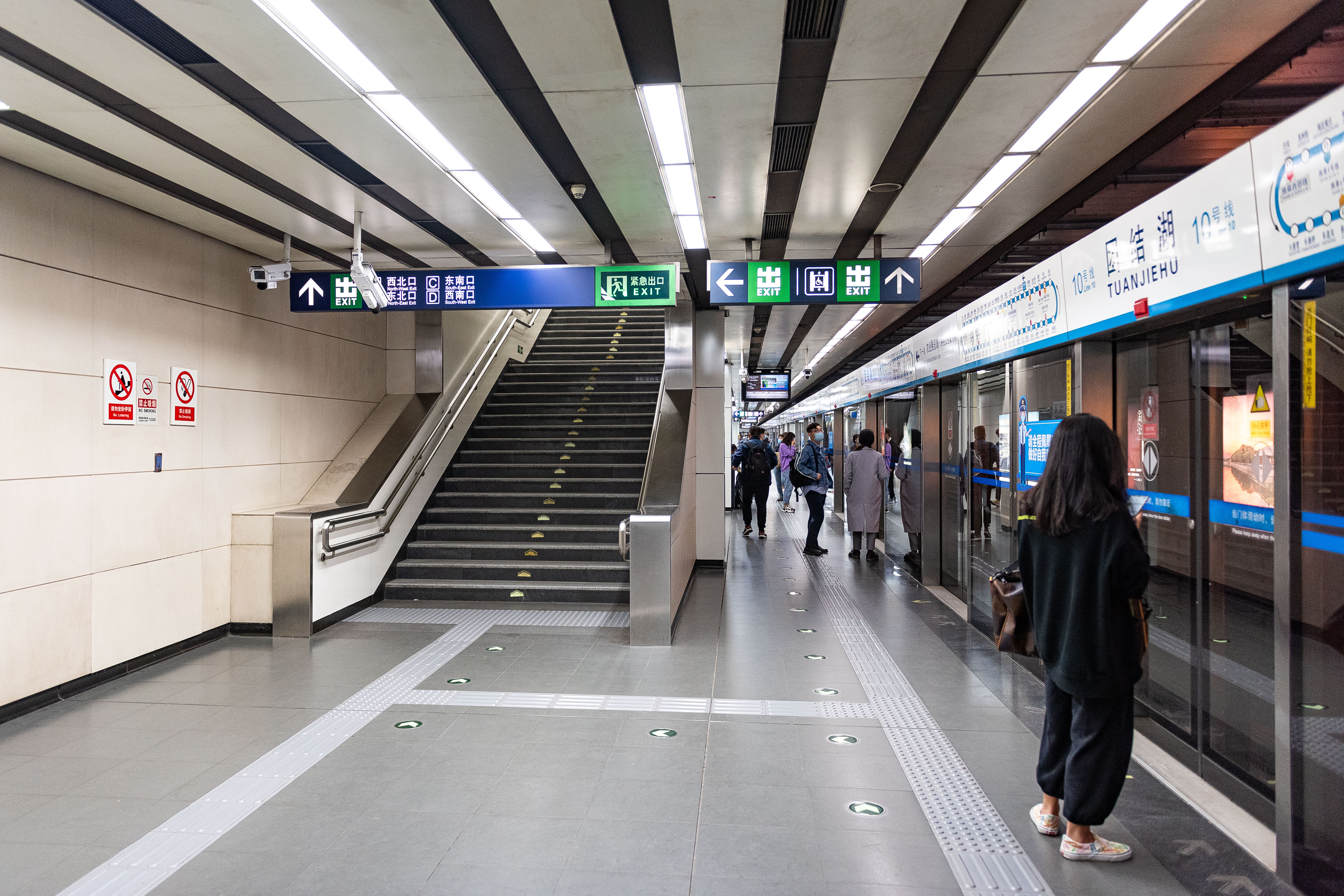
Counter-clockwise platform (April 2021)
