= Nie Zuoren =

Chinese academic and engineer

- 聂祚仁

President of Beijing University of Technology
- Incumbent
- Assumed office January 2021
- Preceded by: Liu Gonghui

Personal details
- Born: 15 January 1963 (age 63) Changsha, Hunan, China
- Party: Chinese Communist Party
- Education: Wuhan University of Technology; Central South University
- Scientific career
- Fields: Metallurgy
- Workplaces: Beijing University of Technology

Chinese name
- Simplified Chinese: 聂祚仁
- Traditional Chinese: 聶祚仁
Transcriptions
Standard Mandarin
- Hanyu Pinyin: Niè Zuòrén

Nie Zuoren (born 15 January 1963) is a Chinese engineer who is a professor and president of Beijing University of Technology, and an academician of the Chinese Academy of Engineering.

== Biography ==
Nie was born in Changsha, Hunan, on 15 January 1963. In 1979, he attended Wuhan University of Technology, graduating in 1983 with a bachelor's degree. He went on to receive his master's degree in 1992 and doctor's degree in 1997 at Central South University of Technology (now Central South University).

From September 2002 to March 2004, he was a professor at Tokyo University and Nagoya University. In April 2013, he became the deputy president of Beijing University of Technology, rising to president in January 2021.

== Honors and awards ==
- 2008 State Technological Invention Award (Second Class)
- 2010 State Science and Technology Progress Award (Second Class)
- 2012 State Science and Technology Progress Award (Second Class)
- 27 November 2017 Member of the Chinese Academy of Engineering (CAE)

Educational offices
Preceded by Liu Gonghui (柳贡慧)	President of Beijing University of Technology; 2021–present	Incumbent
