= Beijing University of Technology =

Municipal public university in Beijing, China

- 北京工业大学
- Seal of the University
- Motto: 不息为体 日新为道
- Motto in English: Taking persistence in pursuit as the substance, taking innovation everyday as the way
- Type: Public
- Established: October 15, 1960; 66 years ago
- Academic affiliations: NAHLU, BHUA, SSU
- President: Qiao Junfei
- Party Secretary: He Ming
- Academic staff: 2,303 (2026)
- Students: 28,720 (2026)
- Undergraduates: 14,668
- Postgraduates: 13,734
- Doctoral students: 4,026
- Location: Beijing, China; 39.8759°N 116.4820°E
- Campus: Urban
- Colors: Blue
- Website: www.bjut.edu.cn

Chinese name
- Simplified Chinese: 北京工业大学
- Traditional Chinese: 北京工業大學
Transcriptions
Standard Mandarin
- Hanyu Pinyin: Běijīng Gōngyè Dàxué

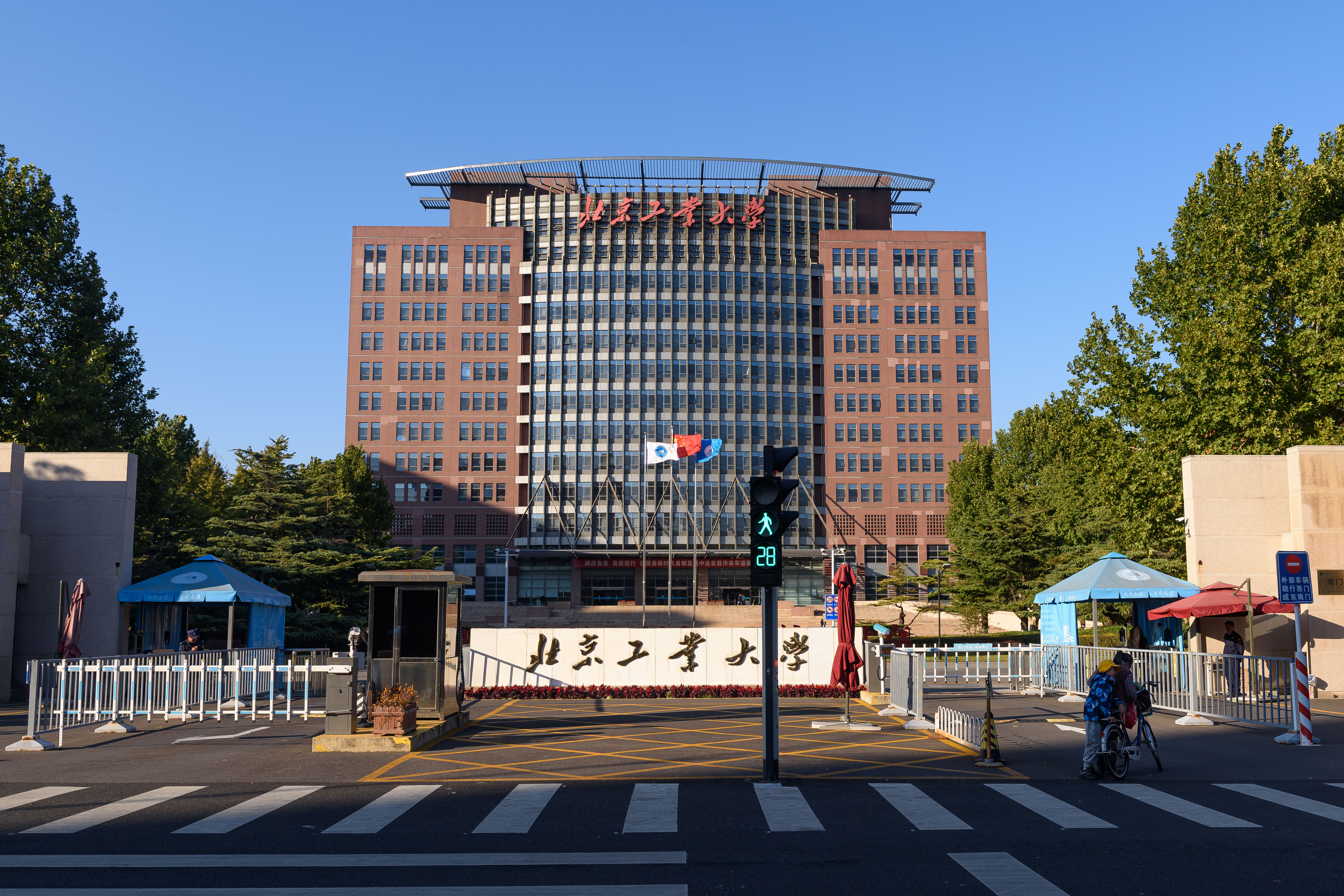
South gate

The Beijing University of Technology (BJUT; 北京工业大学; lit. 'Beijing Industrial University') is a municipal public university in Chaoyang, Beijing, China. Founded in 1960, it is affiliated with and funded by the Beijing Municipal People's Government, and is the only Beijing municipal university admitted to Project 211. It is also part of the Double First-Class Construction, with civil engineering as its designated discipline. BJUT is primarily an engineering university whose programs also span science, economics, management, literature, law, education and the arts. As of September 2026 it had 28,720 students, nearly half of them postgraduates, and 2,303 full-time teachers.

== History ==
=== Founding and early years ===
BJUT was founded in 1960 with five departments: mechanical engineering, electrical engineering, radio, chemical engineering, and mathematics and physics. A civil engineering and architecture department was added in 1961, when some students were transferred to the university from the Beijing Institute of Civil Engineering and Architecture, the Beijing Institute of Technology and Beijing Normal University. During the Cultural Revolution the chemical engineering department was closed, and in 1971 four departments were admitting students.

=== Expansion ===
Between 1978 and 1989 the university reorganized itself into twelve departments. In 1981 it was among the first group of institutions approved by the Ministry of Education to award master's degrees, and in 1985 it gained the right to award doctorates. Several institutions were later merged into it: the College of Economics and Management of Beijing Union University in 1990, the Beijing Computer Institute in 1993, three Beijing-based institutions from the building-materials and water-resources sectors in 2000, and the Beijing Institute of Art and Design in 2005. In 1996 BJUT passed the preliminary review for Project 211.

=== 21st century ===
The university's gymnasium hosted the badminton and rhythmic gymnastics events of the 2008 Summer Olympics. In February 2012 BJUT signed an agreement with University College Dublin to set up a joint college, which opened in March 2013 as Beijing-Dublin International College; the Fan Gongxiu Honors College followed in 2014. BJUT entered the Double First-Class Construction in September 2017 and was retained in the second-round list announced in 2022.

In October 2025 the university established four new schools, of New Energy, Integrated Circuits, Artificial Intelligence and Cyberspace Security, and construction of a new campus in Fangshan began the same year. Qiao Junfei succeeded Nie Zuoren as president in May 2026.

== Organization ==
BJUT is administered by the Beijing municipal government. As of September 2026 it had 34 teaching and research units. Sixteen discipline-based schools cover mechanical engineering; materials science and engineering; information science and technology; computer science; civil engineering; urban transportation; architecture and urban planning; environmental science and engineering; chemistry and life science; physics and optoelectronic engineering; mathematics, statistics and mechanics; sociology; foreign languages; economics and management; Marxism; and art and design. The other units include the four schools created in 2025, Beijing-Dublin International College, the Fan Gongxiu Honors College, a college for carbon-neutrality technology, a school of continuing education, and several research institutes.

== Academics ==
=== Programs ===
BJUT offers 67 undergraduate programs, 64 of which were admitting students in 2026. At postgraduate level it has 30 doctoral and 57 master's degree-granting programs, among them 22 first-level disciplines authorized to award doctorates, as well as 19 postdoctoral research stations. Three of its disciplines are designated National Key Disciplines: optical engineering, materials science and structural engineering. Under the Double First-Class Construction, civil engineering is its core discipline, supported by environmental science and engineering and by transportation engineering.

=== Faculty ===
As of September 30, 2026, the university had 3,341 staff, of whom 2,303 were full-time teachers, including 615 of full professorial rank and 991 of associate rank. Its eight full-time "strategic scientists" comprise five members of the Chinese Academy of Engineering and three members of the Engineering Academy of Japan.

=== Research ===
According to the university, it hosts two State Key Laboratories, two National Engineering Laboratories, one National Engineering Research Center, five "111 Project" bases, four Ministry of Education key laboratories and 26 Beijing municipal key laboratories, and publishes four academic journals. It reports that during the 14th Five-Year Plan period its researchers published 12 papers in Science and Nature as first or corresponding authors or with BJUT as the lead institution, and that its competitive research income was 48% higher than in the preceding five-year period. Eleven of its fields are in the top 1% of the Essential Science Indicators, with engineering and materials science in the top 0.1%.

=== Rankings ===
University rankings

Global – Overall
- ARWU World: 201–300 (2026)
- QS World: 731–740 (2027)

Regional – Overall
- QS Asia: 230 (2025)

In the 2026 Academic Ranking of World Universities, BJUT was placed in the 201–300 band, and it ranked 65th in ShanghaiRanking's Best Chinese Universities Ranking. In the 2026 Global Ranking of Academic Subjects, 23 of its subjects were ranked; civil engineering placed ninth in the world, metallurgical engineering 27th, marine and ocean engineering 44th, and mining and mineral engineering 47th. The QS World University Rankings placed BJUT at 731–740 in its 2027 edition, up from 791–800 in the 2026 edition.

In 2025, BJUT was ranked 528th globally and 140th in Asia by the U.S. News & World Report Best Global Universities Ranking, 475th by the Center for World University Rankings and 176th by the CWTS Leiden Ranking.

== Campus ==
The main campus is at 100 Pingleyuan in Chaoyang District, in southeastern Beijing. The university has further campuses in Tongzhou, at Guanzhuang and Huixin East Street in Chaoyang, and at Liulijing in Dongcheng; together they cover about 913,600 square meters. A new campus in Fangshan has been under construction since 2025.

The Beijing University of Technology Gymnasium on the main campus was the venue for badminton and rhythmic gymnastics at the 2008 Summer Olympics and has since been used for university and city sports.

== Students and international exchange ==
As of September 2026, BJUT had 28,720 students: 14,668 undergraduates, 13,107 full-time postgraduates (9,081 master's and 4,026 doctoral students) and 627 part-time postgraduates.

The university reports partnerships with more than 200 institutions in 41 countries and regions, more than 70 long-term and 20 short-term exchange programs, and a cumulative total of nearly 10,000 international students from more than 90 countries. Beijing-Dublin International College, run jointly with University College Dublin, is its Sino-foreign cooperative college.

== Notable alumni ==
- Zhang Rongming - vice chairwoman, Chinese People's Political Consultative Conference
- Li Erran Li – Researcher at Amazon Web Services
- Yang Shao-Horn – Professor at Massachusetts Institute of Technology
- Xiang Wang – Former President of Xiaomi
- Ying Wu – Founder and CEO of UTStarcom
- Xiaodong Zhang – Professor at The Ohio State University

== See also ==
- High School Attached to Beijing University of Technology
- Campus real three-dimensional map
