= National Alliance of High-level Local Universities =

- 全国地方高水平大学联盟
- Formation: 2012; 14 years ago
- Founded at: Beijing University of Technology, Beijing, China
- Region served: China
- Members: 5 universities

National Alliance of High-level Local Universities, abbreviated as NAHLU, was formed jointly by five provincial/municipal universities, including Beijing University of Technology, Soochow University, Shanghai University, Zhengzhou University, and Nanchang University, in 2012.

== History ==
In December 2012, the first summit was held in Beijing University of Technology.

In December 2013, National Regional High-Level University Development Summit held in Suzhou, organized by the Union with assistance of Soochow University and Shanghai University.

In October 2014, Union summit held in Zhengzhou University. Leaders and representatives from 49 local colleges and universities participated.
