= Li Erran Li =

American engineer

Li Erran Li from the Bell Labs, Alcatel-Lucent, Edison, New Jersey, was named Fellow of the Institute of Electrical and Electronics Engineers (IEEE) in 2013 "for contributions to the design of algorithms and protocols for wireless networks". He was elected as an ACM Fellow in 2017.
