= Beijing Ritan High School =

- 北京市日坛中学
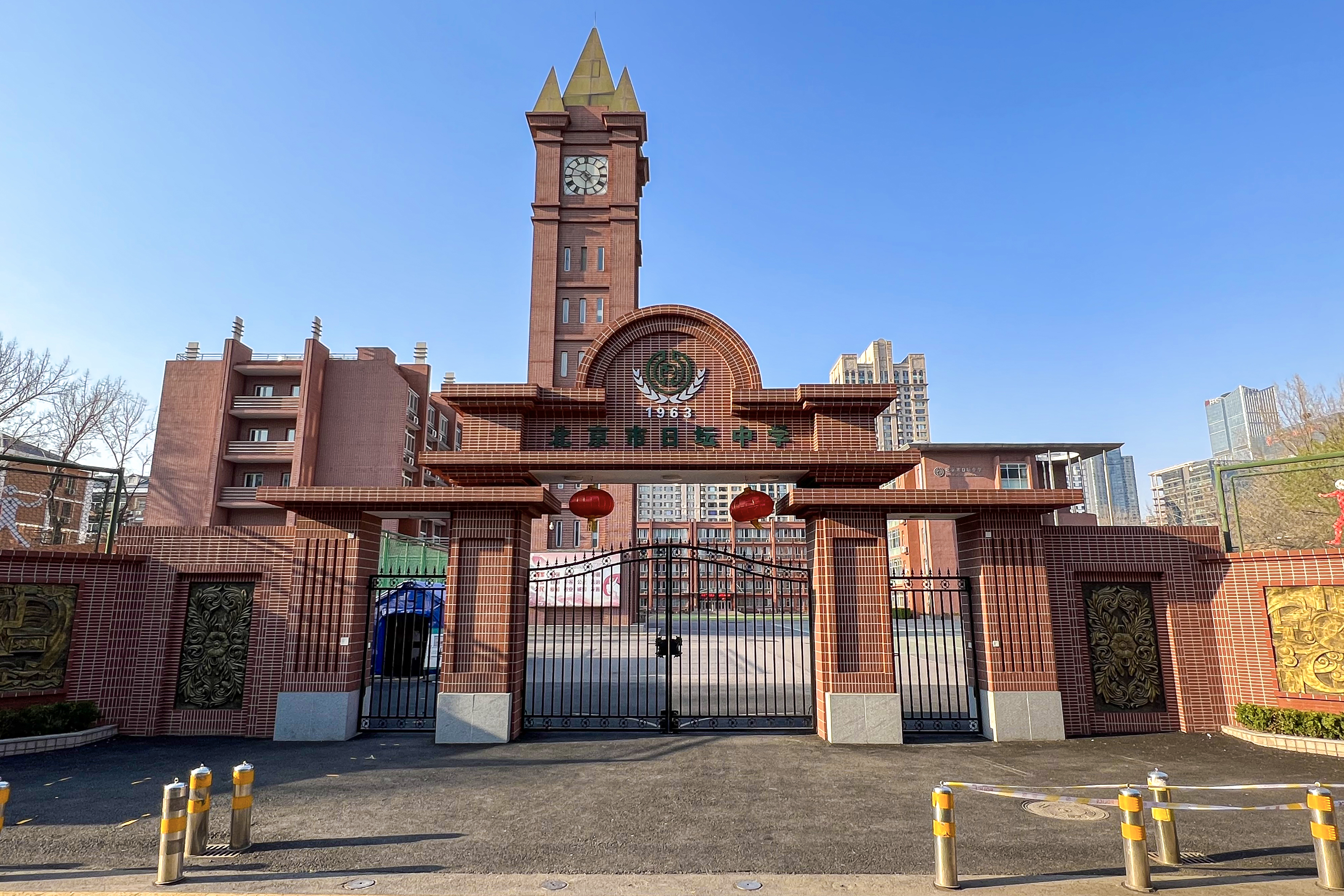
- North campus

Location
- 4 Guanghua Xili, Jianwai Subdistrict; Chaoyang District, Beijing; China
- Coordinates: 39.90923°N 116.44623°E

Information
- Type: Public school
- Established: 1963

Beijing Ritan High School (北京市日坛中学) is a public secondary school in Chaoyang, Beijing, China. The school is supervised by the Beijing City Chaoyang District Education Committee.
