= Zhang Rongming =

Chinese politician

Zhang Rongming (Chinese: 张榕明; born June 1944) is a Chinese politician who served as the vice chairperson of the Chinese People's Political Consultative Conference.
