= High School Attached to Beijing University of Technology =

Secondary school in Chaoyang, Beijing, China

- 北京工业大学附属中学
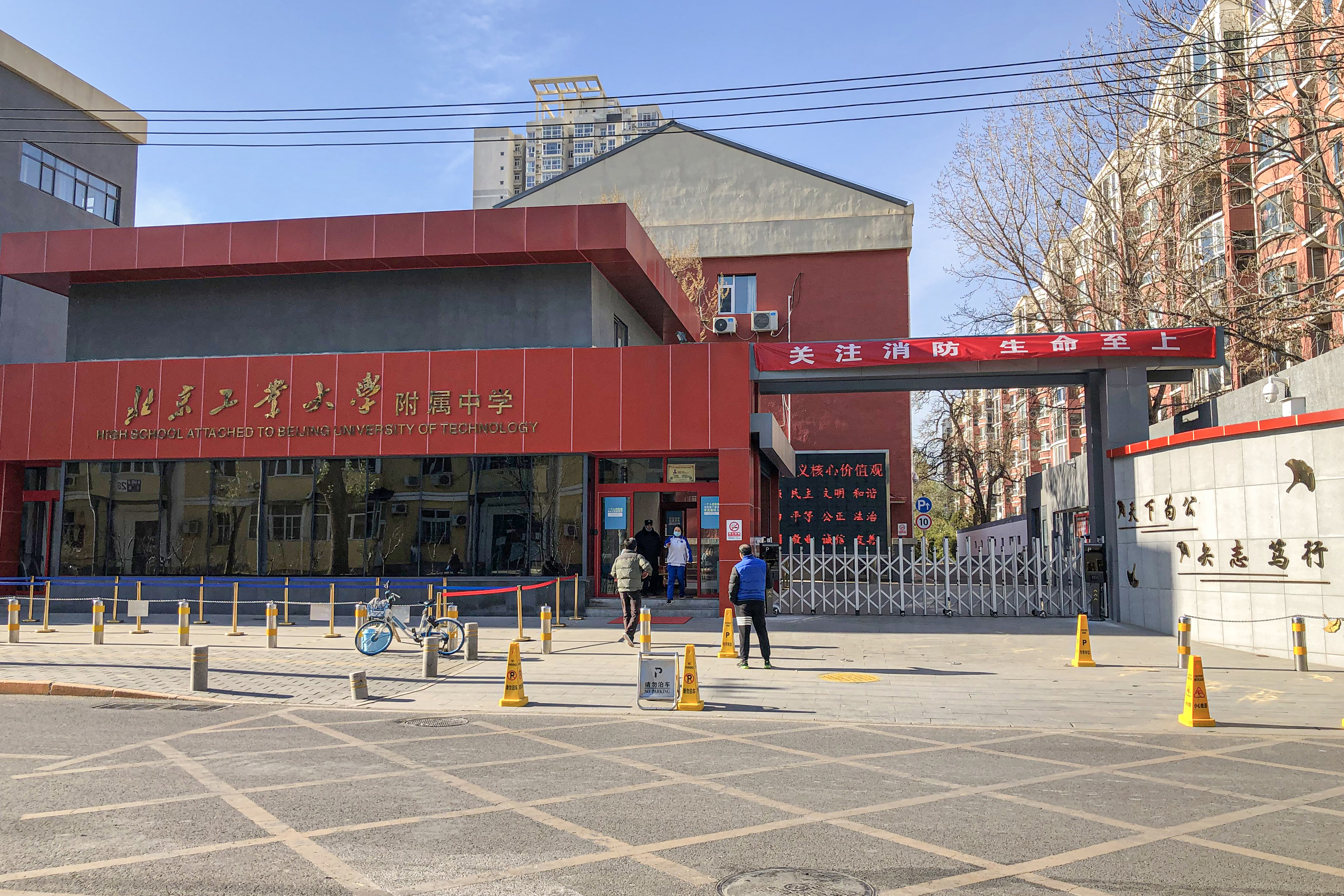
- Chuiyangliu Middle Street, Chaoyang District, Beijing, China

Information
- Type: High school
- Established: 1957
- Status: Open
- Authority: Beijing Municipal Government
- Principal: Li Jun (李军)
- Enrollment: Over 2,000
- Campus type: Urban

High School Attached to Beijing University of Technology (Chinese: 北京工业大学附属中学) is a high school located in Chuiyangliu Middle Street, Chaoyang District, Beijing, China. It is one of the beacon high schools accredited by Beijing municipal Government.

== History ==
Established in 1957, the school has four (formerly three) locations in the Beijing central business district. In 1989, it was designated a key secondary school by the Chaoyang District government. It has over 2,000 students and 277 employees.

In 2002, the school's incoming class was split into five classes of male students and five classes of female students in the aim of preventing puppy love among the students. The school administration conducted the experiment, stating they would implement changes depended on how students' grades compared to before the gender division. The experiment was inspired by the single-sex education done by foreign schools.

Principal Li Jun (李军), who entered the role in 2004, has played a significant role in shaping the school's development in the early 21st century.

Faculty member Li Fazhao (李发兆) was recognized as a national key teacher (国家级骨干教师).

== See also ==
- Beijing University of Technology
