= Tuanjiehu Park =

Urban park in Beijing, China

- Interactive map of Tuanjiehu Park
- Type: Urban park
- Location: Beijing, China
- Area: 14 hectares (35 acres)
- Created: 1986
- Status: Open all year

Tuanjiehu Park (also known as Tuanjie Lake Park) is an urban park of Beijing, China. It is a public city park in Beijing with scenic views and classic landscapes of gardens and water towns in Jiangnan area. The park is located in the Chaoyang District of Beijing, close to the eastern segment of the 3rd Ring Road. The main lake in the park was constructed in 1958. It is one of the 10 largest lakes in urban area of Beijing. The ring shape of this lake symbolizes the unity, and thus the name of the lake is Tuanjiehu or Tuanjie Lake, which mean the Lake of Unity. In 1986, the park was created around the lake.

== Transport ==
- Hujialou station, Line 6 and Line 10, Beijing Subway
