= Hujialou station =

Beijing Subway interchange station

Hujialou 呼家楼
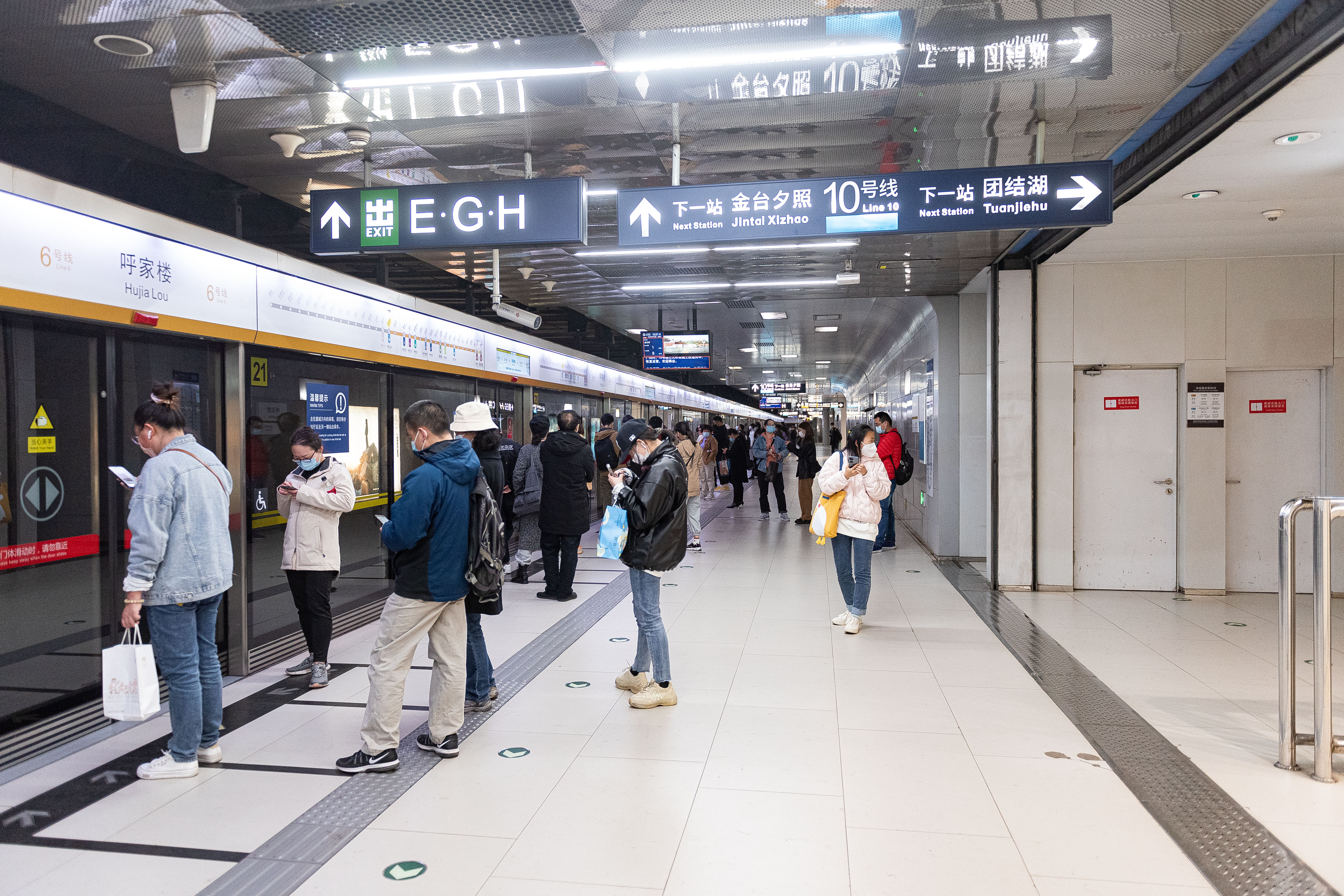
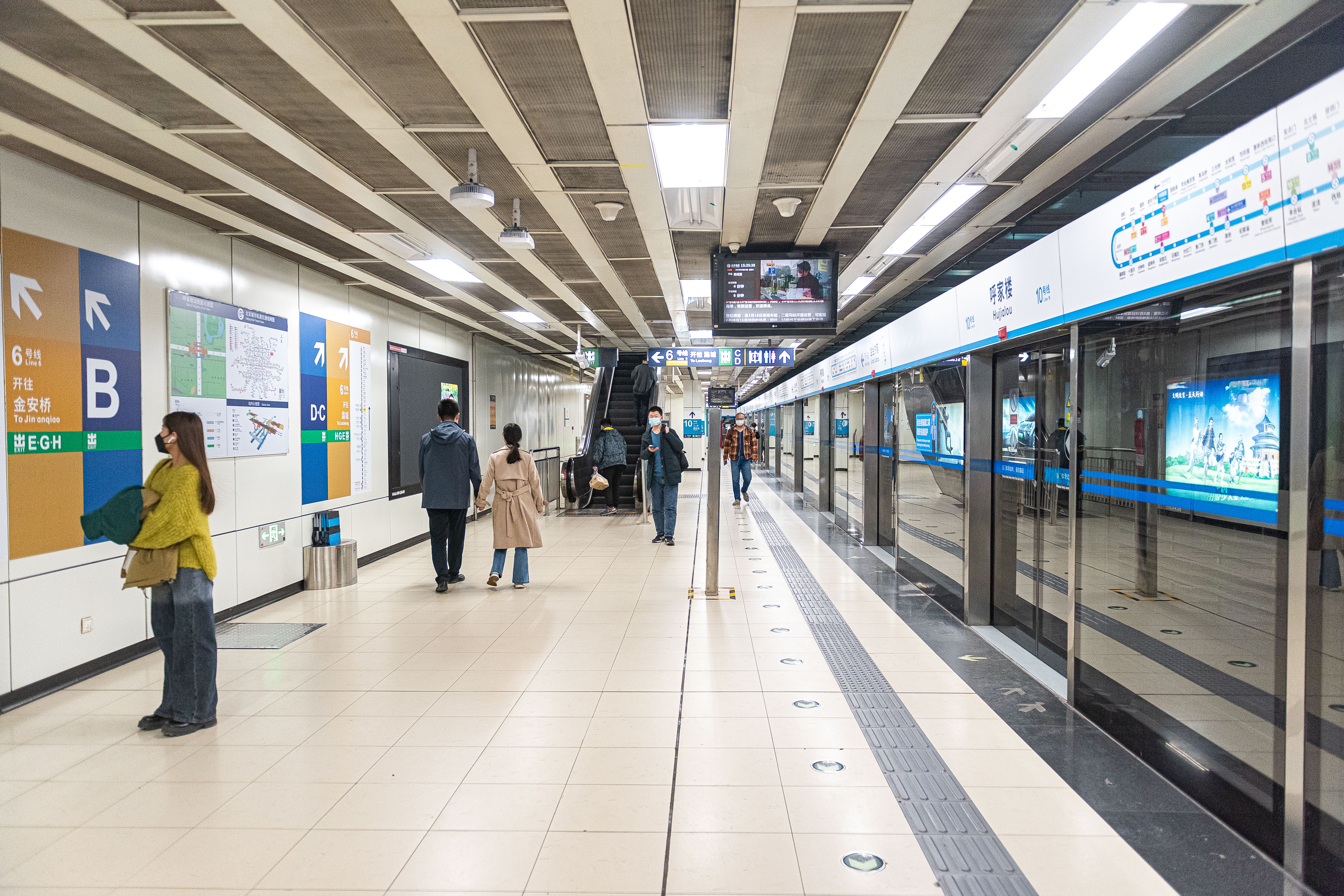
- Line 6 westbound platform Line 10 clockwise platform

General information
- Location: East 3rd Ring Road North and Chaoyang North Road (朝阳北路); Chaoyang District, Beijing; China
- Coordinates: 39.923337°N 116.461618°E
- Operator: Beijing Mass Transit Railway Operation Corporation Limited
- Lines: Line 6; Line 10
- Platforms: 4 (1 split island platform and 2 side platforms)
- Tracks: 4

Construction
- Structure type: Underground
- Accessible: Yes

History
- Opened: December 30, 2012; 13 years ago (Line 6); July 19, 2008; 18 years ago (Line 10)

Services
Preceding station	Beijing Subway	Following station
Dongdaqiao towards Jin'anqiao	Line 6	Jintai Lu towards Luyang
Tuanjiehu outer loop / anticlockwise	Line 10	Jintai Xizhao inner loop / clockwise
Location
- Location within Beijing

Hujialou station (simplified Chinese: 呼家楼站; traditional Chinese: 呼家樓站; pinyin: Hūjiālóu zhàn) is an interchange station on Line 6 and Line 10 of the Beijing Subway. The station handled a peak passenger traffic of 206,800 people on May 5, 2013.

== Station layout ==
The line 6 station has 2 underground side platforms. The line 10 station has an underground split island platform.

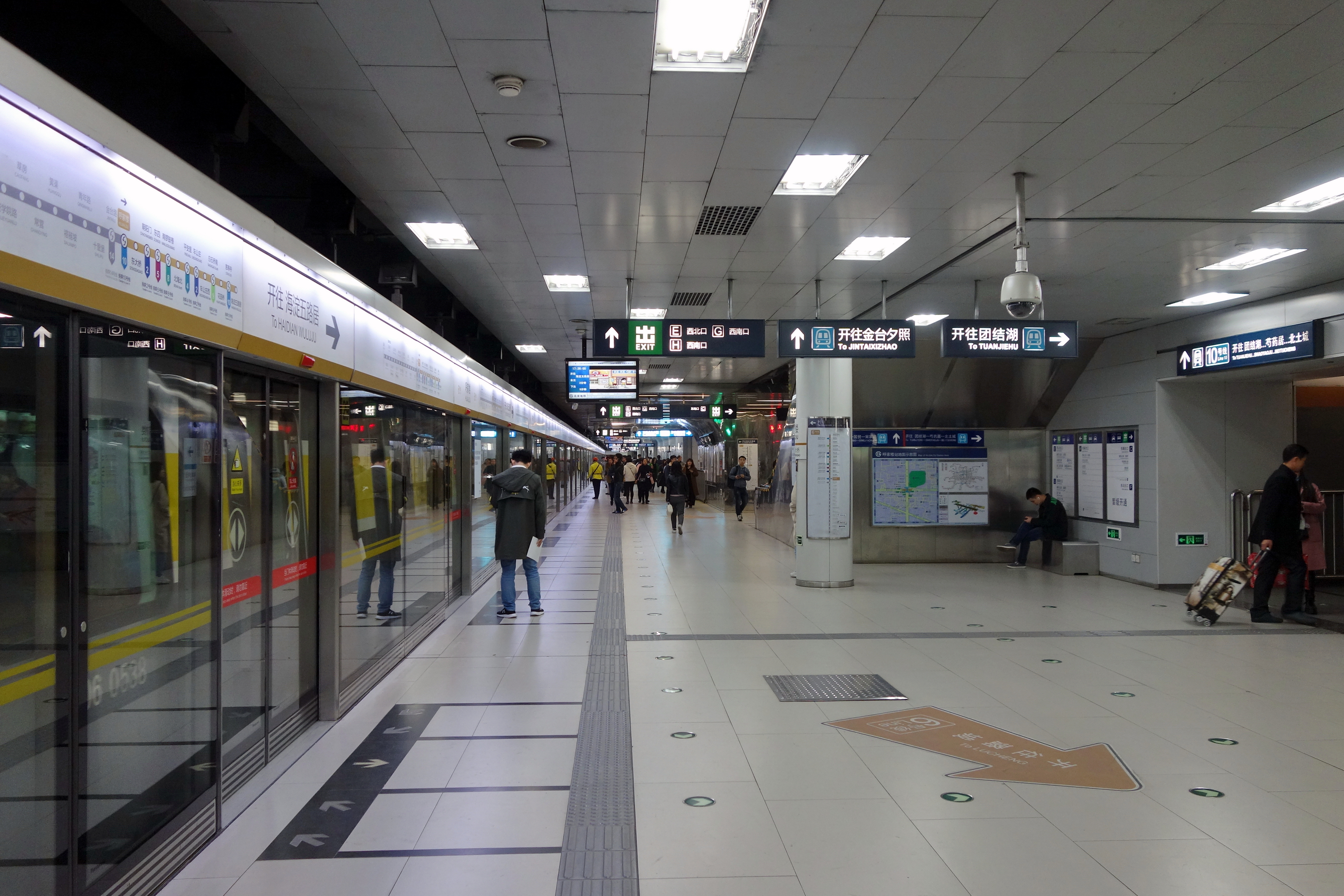
Line 6 platform

== Exits ==
There are 7 exits, lettered B, C, C2, D, E, G, and H. Exits C and E are accessible.

== Nearby ==
- Tuanjiehu Park

== Gallery ==
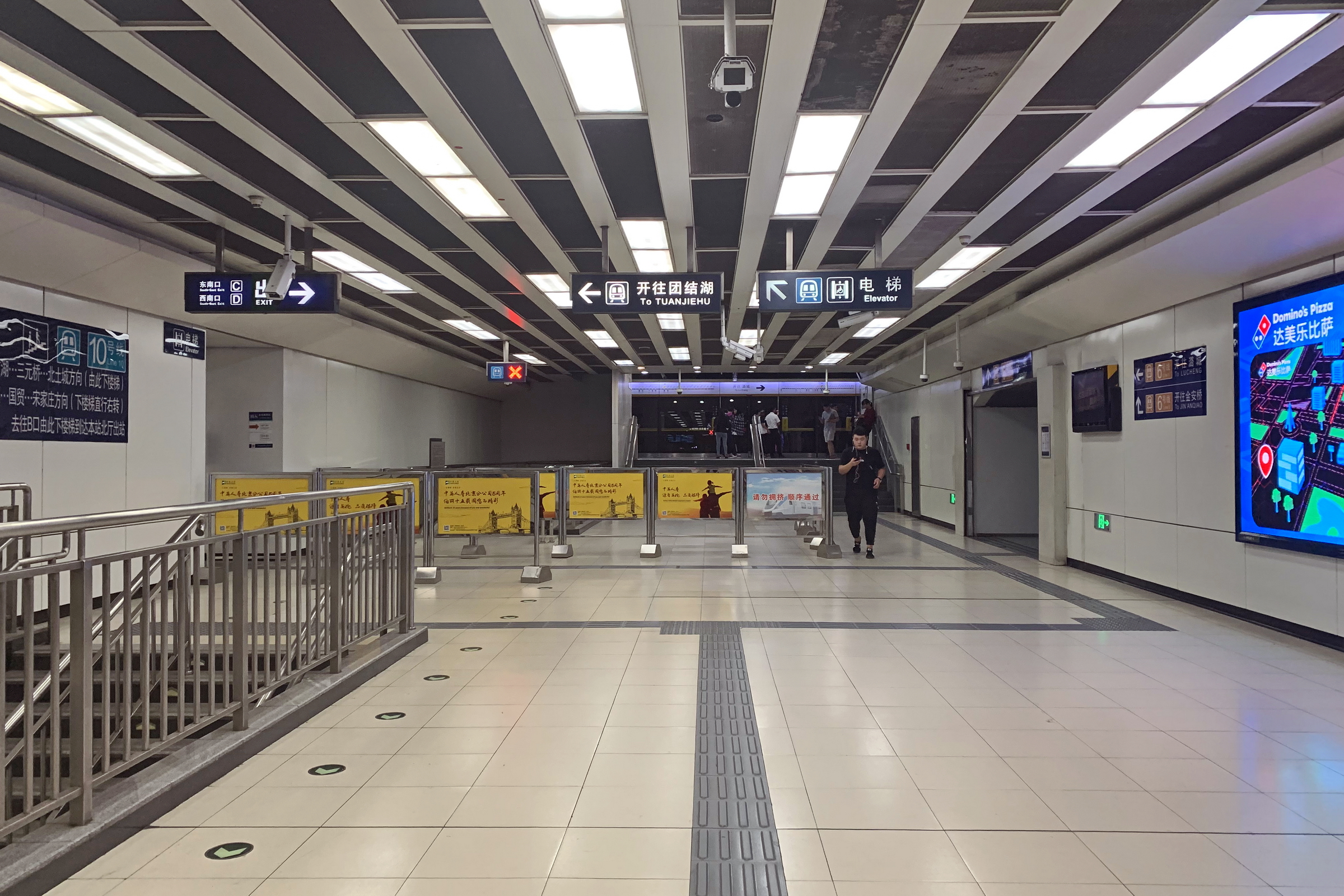
Line 10 transfer hall to Line 6

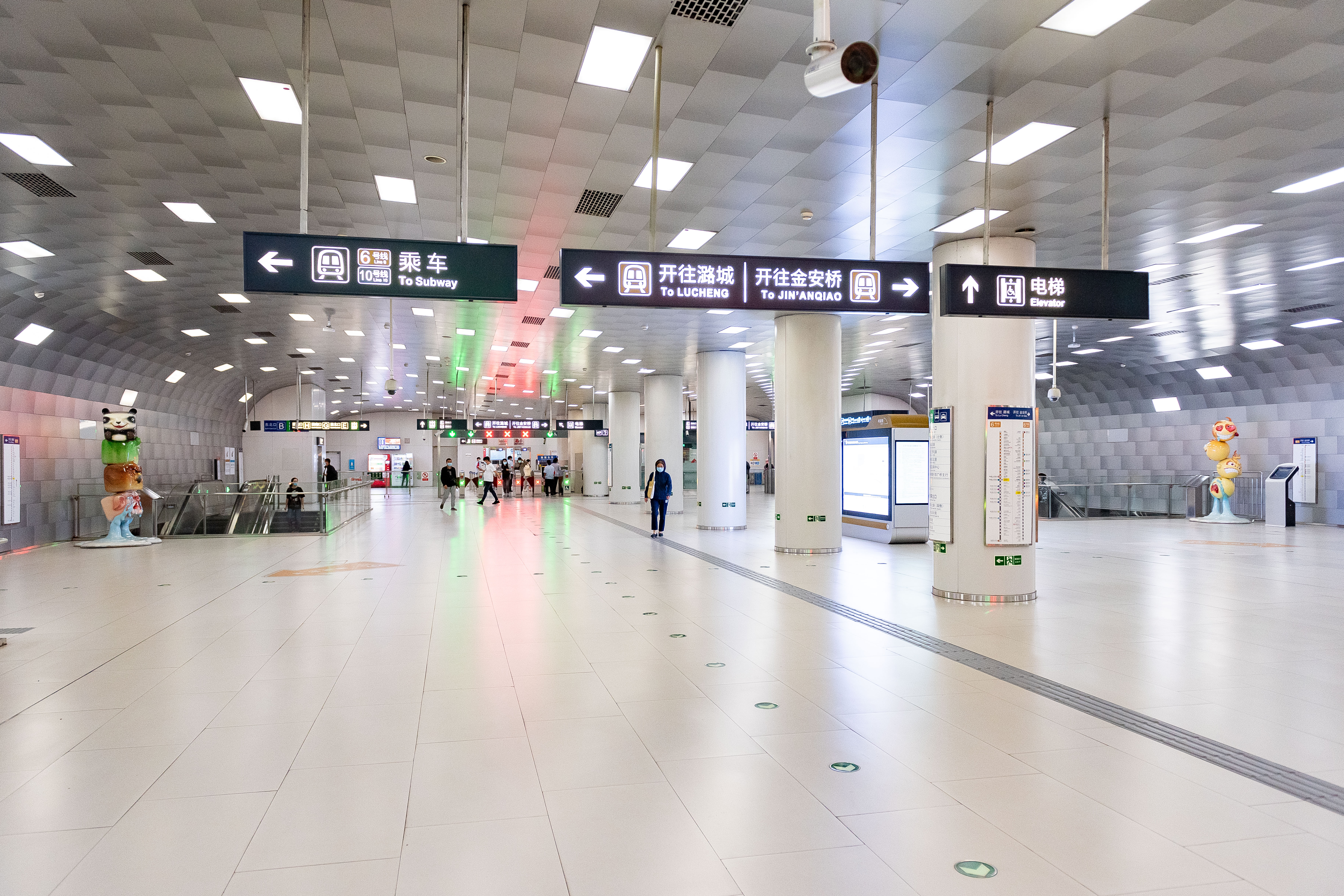
Line 6 west concourse

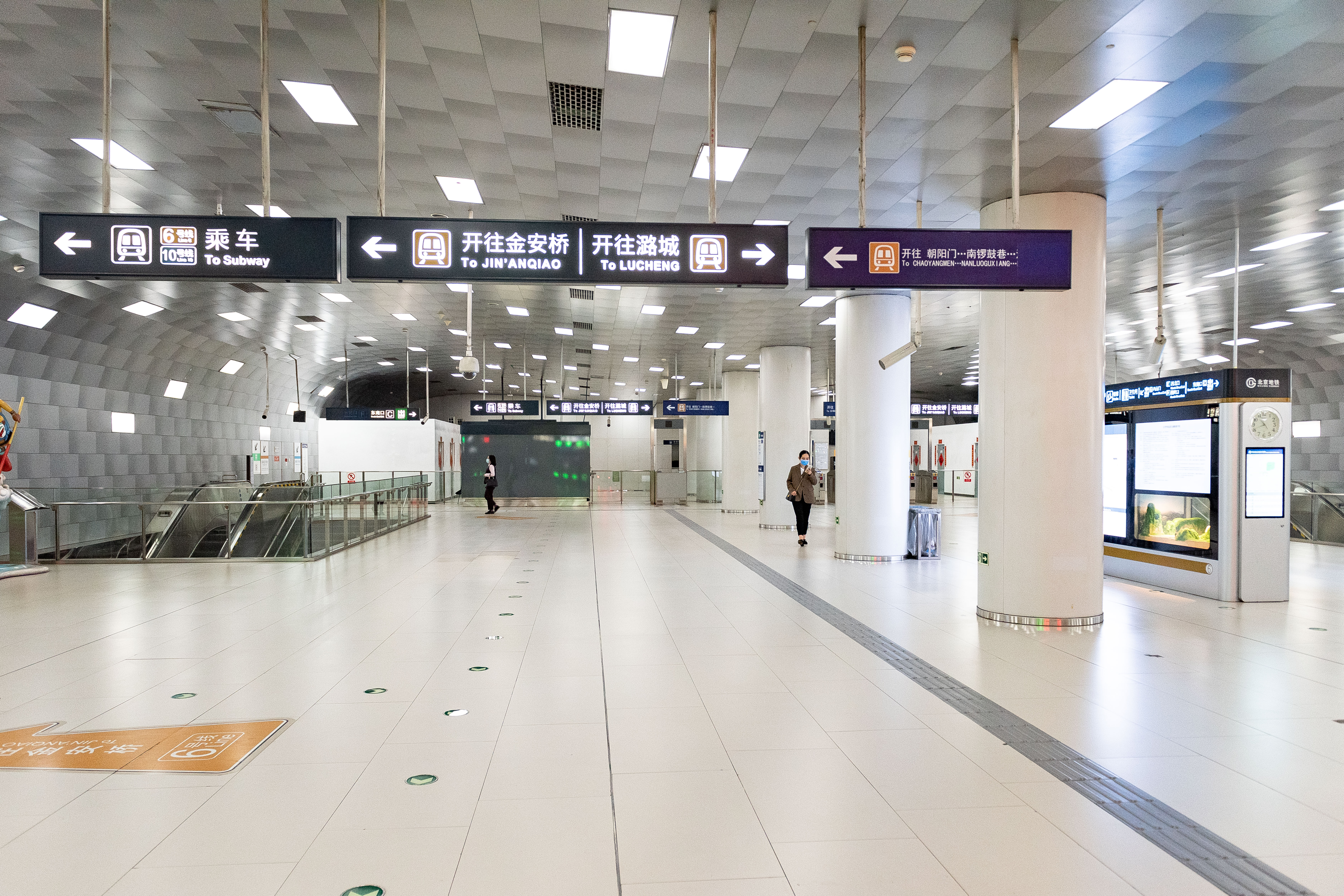
Line 6 east concourse

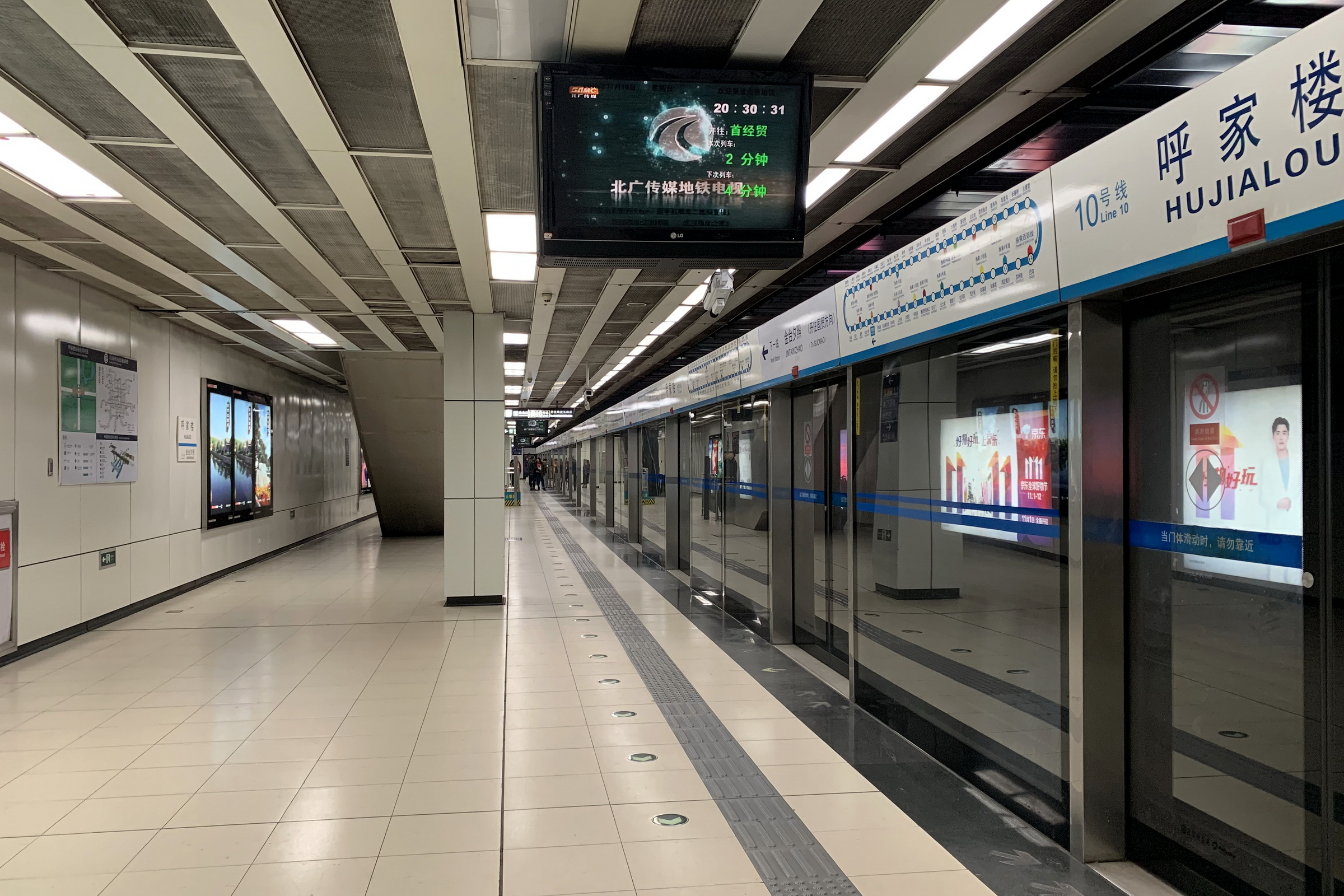
Line 10 platform (November 2018)
