= List of schools in Haidian, Beijing =

This is a list of schools in Haidian District, Beijing.

== Secondary schools ==
Note: In China the word 中学 zhōngxué, literally translated as "middle school", refers to any secondary school and differs from the American usage of the term "middle school" to mean specifically a lower secondary school or junior high school. 初中 chūzhōng is used to refer to a lower secondary school.

- Beihang University Experimental School (北京航空航天大学实验学校) - Main School and Branch School (北航实验学校分校)
- Beijing Bayi School - Secondary School Division (中学部)
- Beijing Bayi School Affiliated Yuquan High School (北京市八一学校附属玉泉中学)
- High School Affiliated to Beijing Institute of Technology - Main Campus, and South Campus (南校区)
- Beijing National Day School - Main School, Branch School 1 (一分校), and Longyue Experimental School (北京市十一学校龙樾实验中学)
- Beijing National Day Experimental School (北京十一实验中学)
- Beijing Normal University Affiliated High School No. 3 (北京师范大学第三附属中学)
- Beijing City No. 19 High School (北京市第十九中学) - East Campus (东校区) and Yangchun Guanghua Campus (阳春光华校区)
- Beijing No. 20 High School - Main School, and Xindu Campus (新都分校)
- Beijing City No. 20 High School Affiliated Experimental School (北京市第二十中学附属实验学校)
- Beijing City No. 47 High School (北京市第四十七中学)
- Beijing 57 High School
- Beijing 101 Middle School - Main School, Junior High School Division (初中部), and Wenquan Campus (温泉校区)
- Beijing 101 Middle School Shiyou Campus (北京一零一中石油分校) - Formerly China University of Petroleum Affiliated High School (北京石油学院附属中学)
- Beijing City Haidian Experimental High School (北京市海淀实验中学) - East Campus (东校区) and West Campus (西校区)
- Beijing Haidian Teachers Training College Affiliated High School (北京市海淀区教师进修学校附属实验学校) - North Campus (北校区) and South Campus (南校区)
- Beijing City Information Management School (北京市信息管理学校} - Zhongguancun Campus (中关村校区)
- Beijing City Jianxiang School (北京市健翔学校) - Main Campus and Renmin University of China Campus (人大校区)
- Beijing City Qinghe High School (北京市清河中学)
- Beijing City Shangdi Experimental School (北京市上地实验学校)
- Beijing City Shangzhuang High School (北京市上庄中学)
- Beijing City Shangzhuang No. 2 High School (北京市上庄第二中学)
- Beijing City Yuhong School (北京市育鸿学校)
- Beijing City Yuying School (北京市育英学校)
- Beijing City Yuyuantan High School (北京市玉渊潭中学)
- Beijing City Zhongguancun High School - Main Campus, Qinghuayuan Campus (清华园校区), Shuangyushu Campus (双榆树校区), and Zhichun Branch School (知春分校)
- Beijing City Haidian District North Part New District Experimental School (北京市海淀北部新区实验学校)
- Beijing Experimental School (Haidian) (北京实验学校（海淀）)
- Beijing Foreign Studies University Affiliated High School
- Middle School Affiliated to Beijing Jiaotong University - East Campus (东校区), North Campus (北校区), and South Campus (南校区) - Also has the Branch School (分校) and No. 2 Branch School (第二分校)
- Beijing Zhongfa Experimental School (北京中法实验学校) Beijing City Wenquan No. 2 High School (北京市温泉第二中学)
- China Agricultural University Affiliated High School (中国农业大学附属中学)
- Capital Normal University Affiliated High School (首都师范大学附属中学) - Main School, and No. 1 Branch School (第一分校)
- Capital Normal University Affiliated High School No. 2 (首都师范大学第二附属中学) - Huayuancun Campus (花园村校区) and Shuguang Campus (曙光校区)
- Capital Normal University Affiliated Yuquan School (首都师范大学附属玉泉学校)
- Capital Normal University Affiliated Yuxin School (首都师范大学附属育新学校)
- China University of Geosciences Affiliated High School (中国地质大学(北京)附属中学)
- China University of Mining and Technology, Beijing Affiliated High School (中国矿业大学（北京）附属中学)
- High School Affiliated to Minzu University of China
- High School Affiliated to Renmin University of China - Main Campus, No. 2 Branch School (第二分校), Cuiwei School (翠微学校) Junior High School Campus (初中校区), Cuiwei School Senior High School Campus (高中校区), and Xishan School (西山学校)
- Affiliated High School of Peking University
- Peking University Health Science Center Affiliated High School (北京医学院附属中学) - Main School and Xiangshan School (香山学校)
- Tsinghua University High School - Main School, Shangdi School (上地学校), and Yongfeng School (永丰学校)
- University of Science and Technology Beijing Affiliated High School (北京科技大学附属中学)

== Primary schools ==
- Beijing Bayi School Primary School Division (北京市八一学校（小学部）)
- Beijing No. 11 School Branch School (北京市十一学校一分校)
- Beijing Experimental School (Haidian) (北京实验学校（海淀）) - Primary School Division (小学部)
- High School Affiliated to Beijing Institute of Technology - Primary School Division (小学部)
- Beihang University Experimental School Primary Division (北京航空航天大学实验学校小学部)
- Beijing Yuhong School (Primary School Division) (北京市育鸿学校（小学部）)
- Beijing Yuying School (Primary School Division) (北京市育英学校（小学部）)
- Capital Normal University Affiliated Yuquan School (Primary School Division) (首都师范大学附属玉泉学校（小学部）)
- Tsinghua University High School Yongfeng School (Primary School Division) (清华大学附属中学永丰学校（小学部）)

== International and private schools ==
- Beijing Haidian Foreign Language Shi Yan School (elementary through senior high school)
  - Beijing Haidian International School
- Pennon Foreign Language School, Beijing
- Saint Paul American School
