= Haiwai =

Haiwai may refer to:

- Another spelling of the unincorporated community of Haiwee, California
- Beijing Haidian Foreign Language Shi Yan School, nicknamed "Haiwai"
- QQ Haiwai, an international real estate listings website run by Tencent

== See also ==
- Overseas Chinese (Hǎiwài Huárén)
- Haiwei, a given name
- Hawaii, a U.S. state
