= Shi Baoyuan =

Chinese soldier (1937–2026)

- 石寶源
- Born: 1 May 1937; Huoxian village, Tongxian County, Hebei, China (now Huoxian, Beijing)
- Died: 25 July 2026 (aged 89); Beijing, China
- Military career
- Allegiance: China
- Branch: People's Liberation Army
- Rank: Lieutenant General (中将)
- Commands: Deputy Commander of the Shenyang Military Region; Deputy Commander of the 16th Group Army
- Awards: Second-Class Merit Medal

Shi Baoyuan (Chinese: 石宝源; 1 May 1937 – 25 July 2026) was a Chinese lieutenant general in the People's Liberation Army. He served as the deputy commander of the Shenyang Military Region. He was also a veteran of the 1969 Sino-Soviet border conflict at Zhenbao Island.

== Early life and military career ==
Shi Baoyuan was born on 1 May 1937, in Houxian Village, Tongxian County, Hebei, China (now Huoxian, Beijing). In 1946, he studied in the Beijing Tongzhou District Huoxian Town Central Primary School, and in 1951, he studied at Luhe High School in Tongxian County. In 1954, he entered the First Tank School of the University of the Chinese People's Liberation Army. He joined the Chinese Communist Party in 1955. During his time at the school, he served as a class monitor.

Shi served as a staff officer in the 1st Independent Tank Regiment and as a staff officer and deputy director in the training department of the Shenyang Military Region Armored Corps. He then commanded the 3rd Independent Tank Regiment, the Tank Regiment of the 64th Army, served as chief of staff of the 190th Motorized Division, and was deputy commander and commander of the 4th Tank Division of the 16th Group Army during the 1969 Sino-Soviet border conflict at Zhenbao Island.

He led the operation that captured a Soviet T-62. He earned a Second-Class Merit from the operation. He became deputy commander of the 16th Army in 1984 and deputy commander of the Shenyang Military Region in 1985, serving until his retirement in 1999. He was promoted to major general on 1 September 1988 and lieutenant general on 24 July 1993, he was also a delegate to the 13th CCP National Congress and a deputy to the 8th and 9th National People's Congress.

== Death ==
Shi died in Beijing on 25 July 2026, at the age of 89.
