= Wanshou Temple =

Buddhist temple in Beijing, China

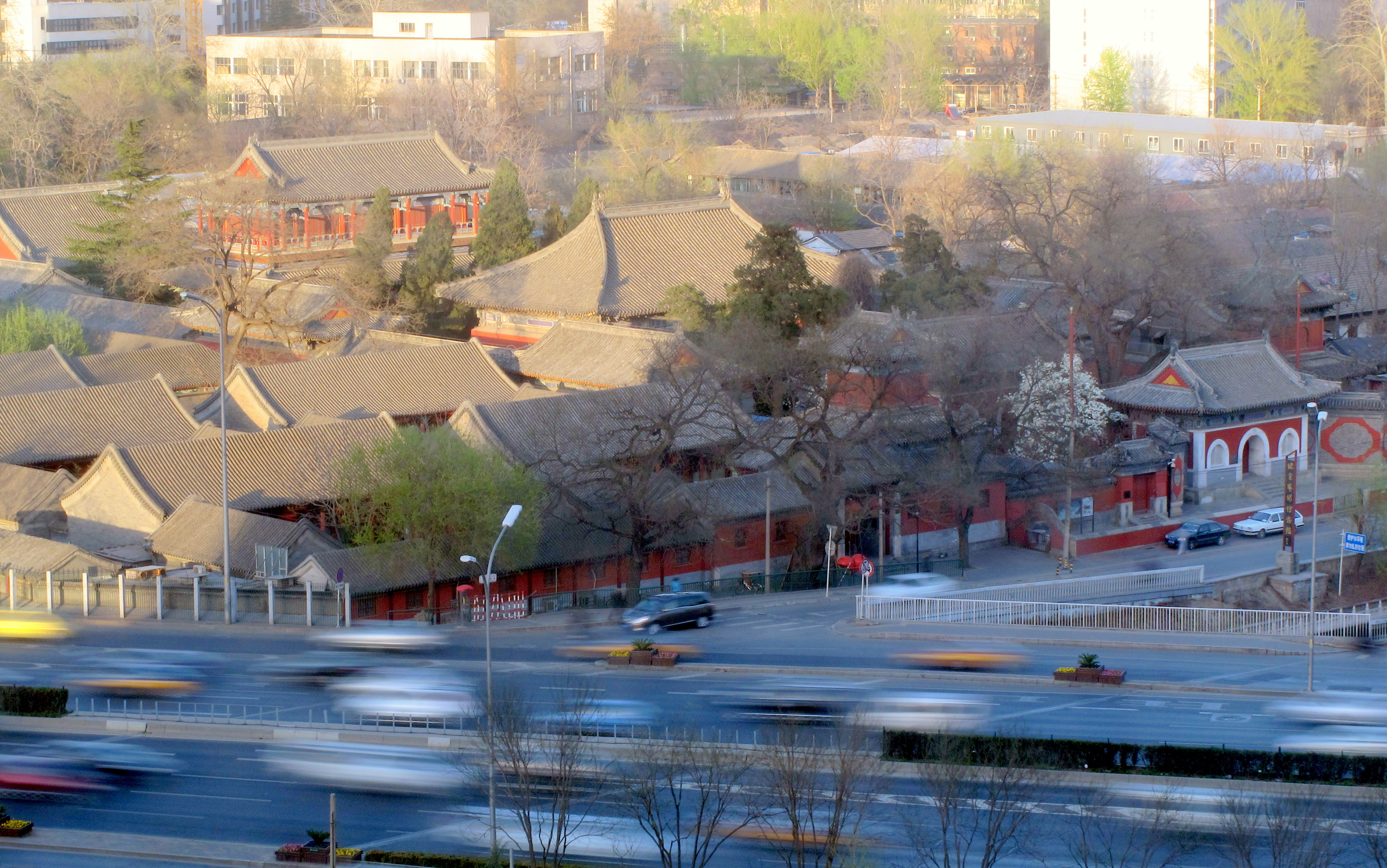
- Overview of the Wanshou Temple complex

- Location in Beijing

Religion
- Affiliation: Buddhism

Location
- Location: No.121, Wanshousi Road, Zizhuyuan Subdistrict, Haidian District, Beijing
- Country: China
- Interactive map of Wanshou Temple
- Coordinates: 39°56′45″N 116°18′19″E

Architecture
- Completed: 1577

The Wanshou Temple (simplified Chinese: 万寿寺; traditional Chinese: 萬壽寺; pinyin: Wànshòu Sì) is a temple located at No.121, Wanshousi Road, Zizhuyuan Subdistrict, Haidian District, Beijing. In addition to being a Buddhist temple, the Wanshou Temple also houses the Beijing Art Museum (北京艺术博物馆 / 北京藝術博物館).

It was built in 1577 during the reign of Emperor Wanli of the Ming dynasty to store Sino-Buddhist scriptures. It later became a permanent celebration place for the rulers.

The Wanshou Temple was known as one of Beijing's most important temples, and it was declared as one of Beijing's "Key Cultural Heritage of Preservation" in August 1979. The Beijing Art Museum housed in the Wanshou Temple has also collected and preserved precious historical relics such as bronze and jade articles of Shang and Zhou dynasties (17th - 3rd centuries B.C), and ancient art treasures such as porcelains, earthenwares, enamels, carved lacquer ware, ivory carving, wood carving, and many relics from past dynasties; it has a permanent collection of 70,000 items.

Among the most important items displayed in the museum includes Chinese paintings and calligraphy from the Ming and Qing dynasties since 1368, Chinese weavings and embroideries of the Ming and Qing dynasties, and ancient coins of China and other countries. Modern Chinese, Japanese and other Asian arts and crafts and paintings are also displayed in the museum.

Wanshou Temple reopened on 16 September 2022 after a five-year renovation.

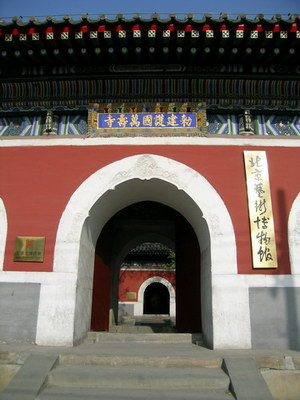
An entrance

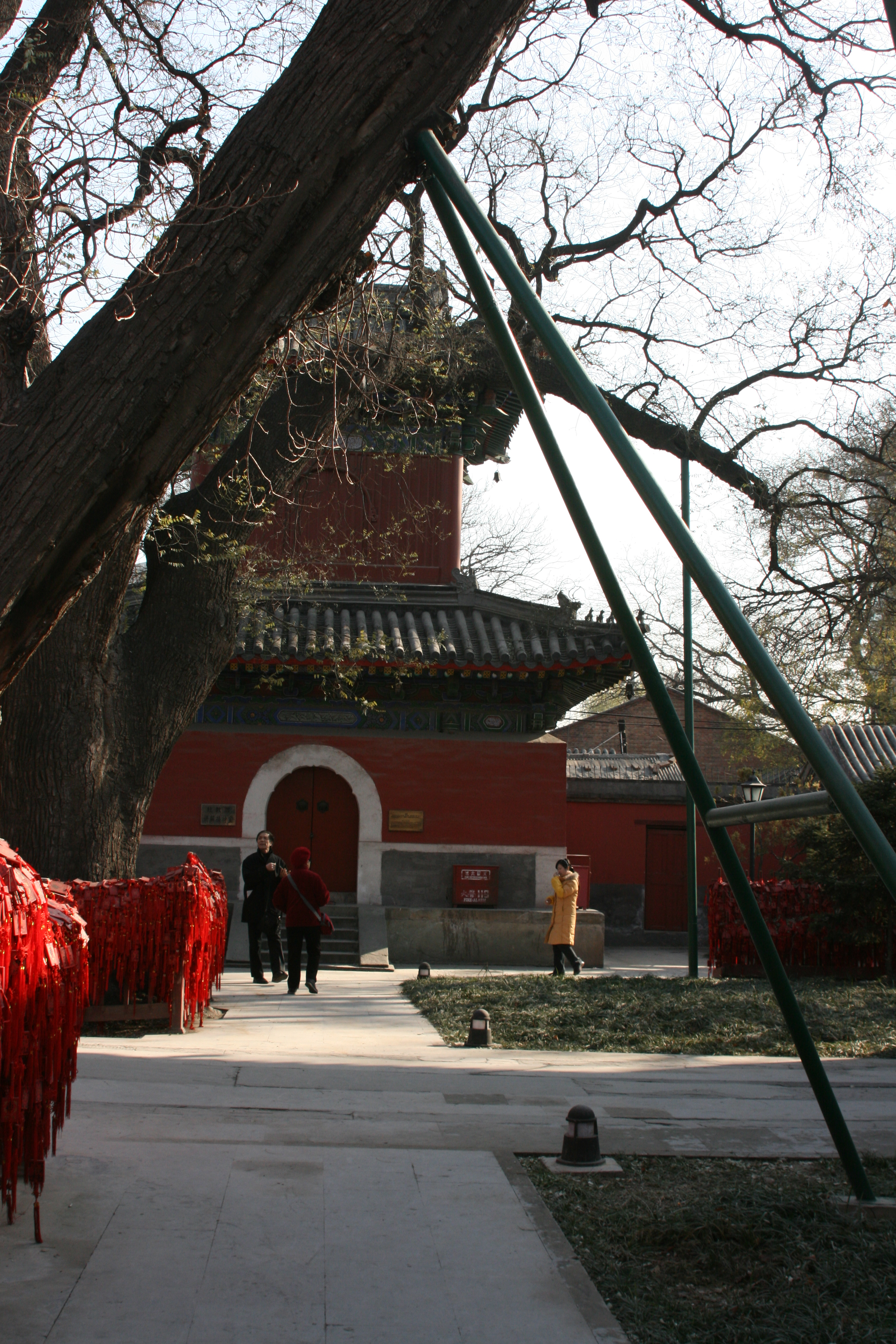
A tower

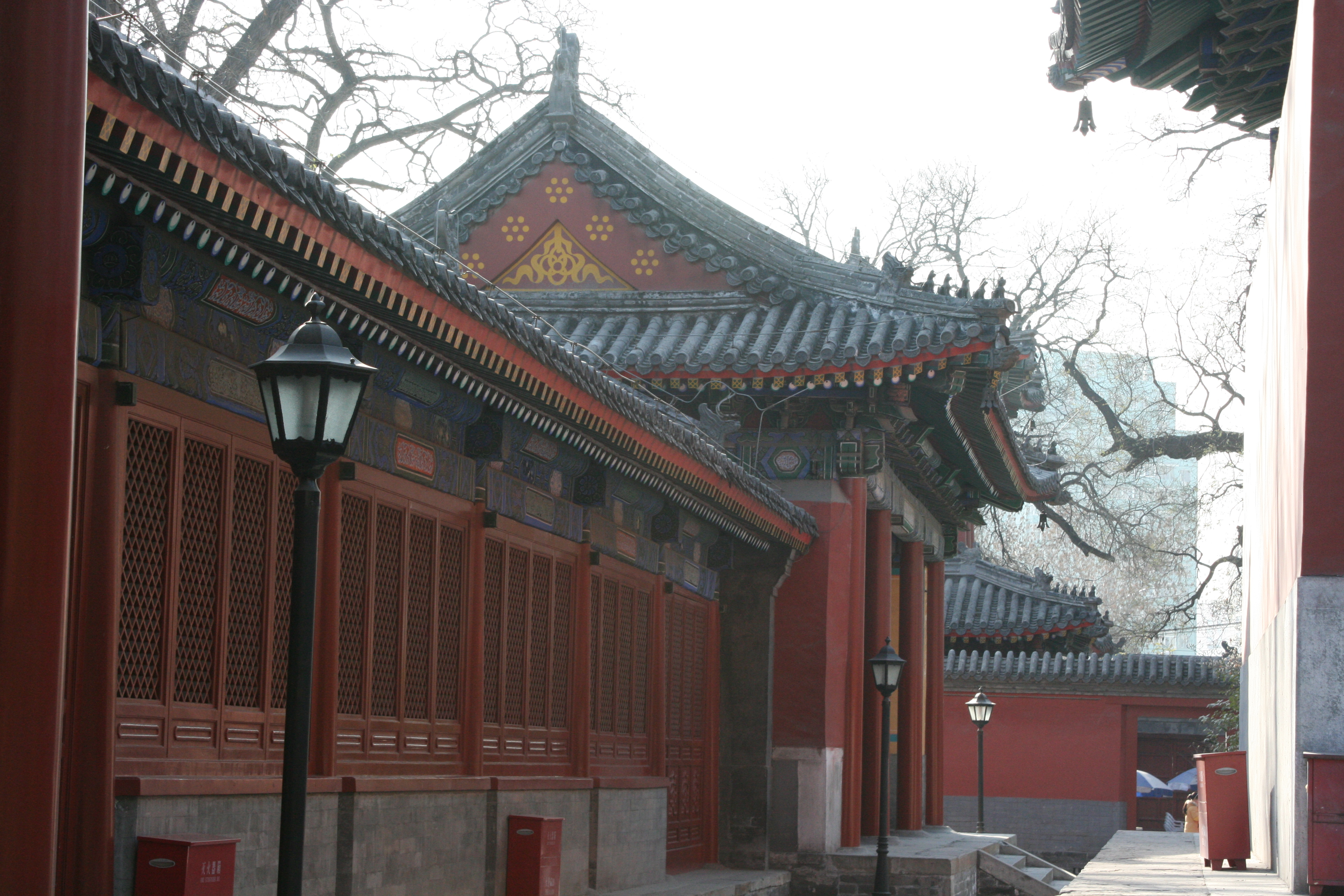
Hallway

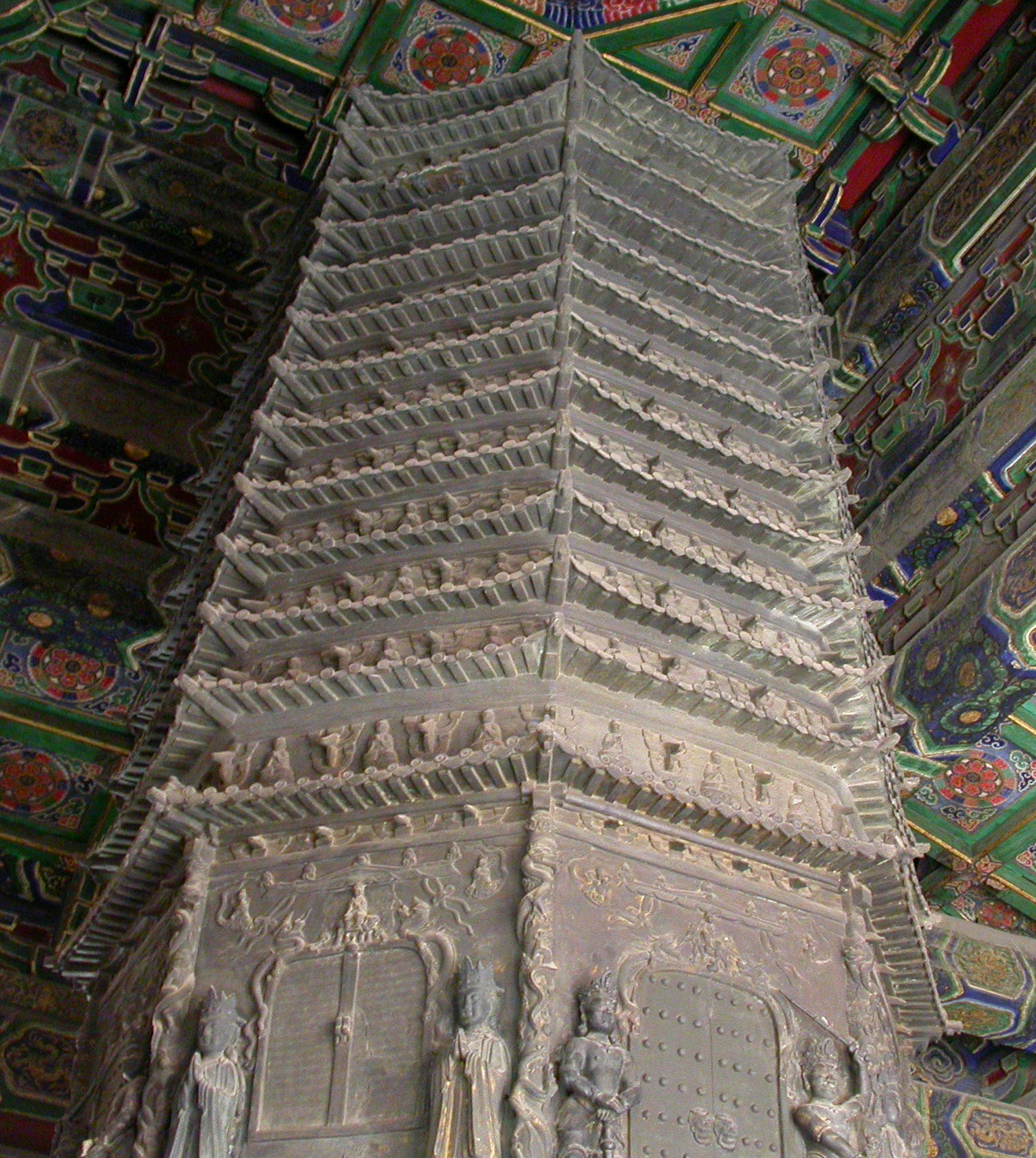
A pagoda located inside one of the halls

== Transport ==
- Wanshousi station
