= Beijing 101 Middle School =

Coordinates: 40.0021°N 116.3004°E

- 北京一零一中学

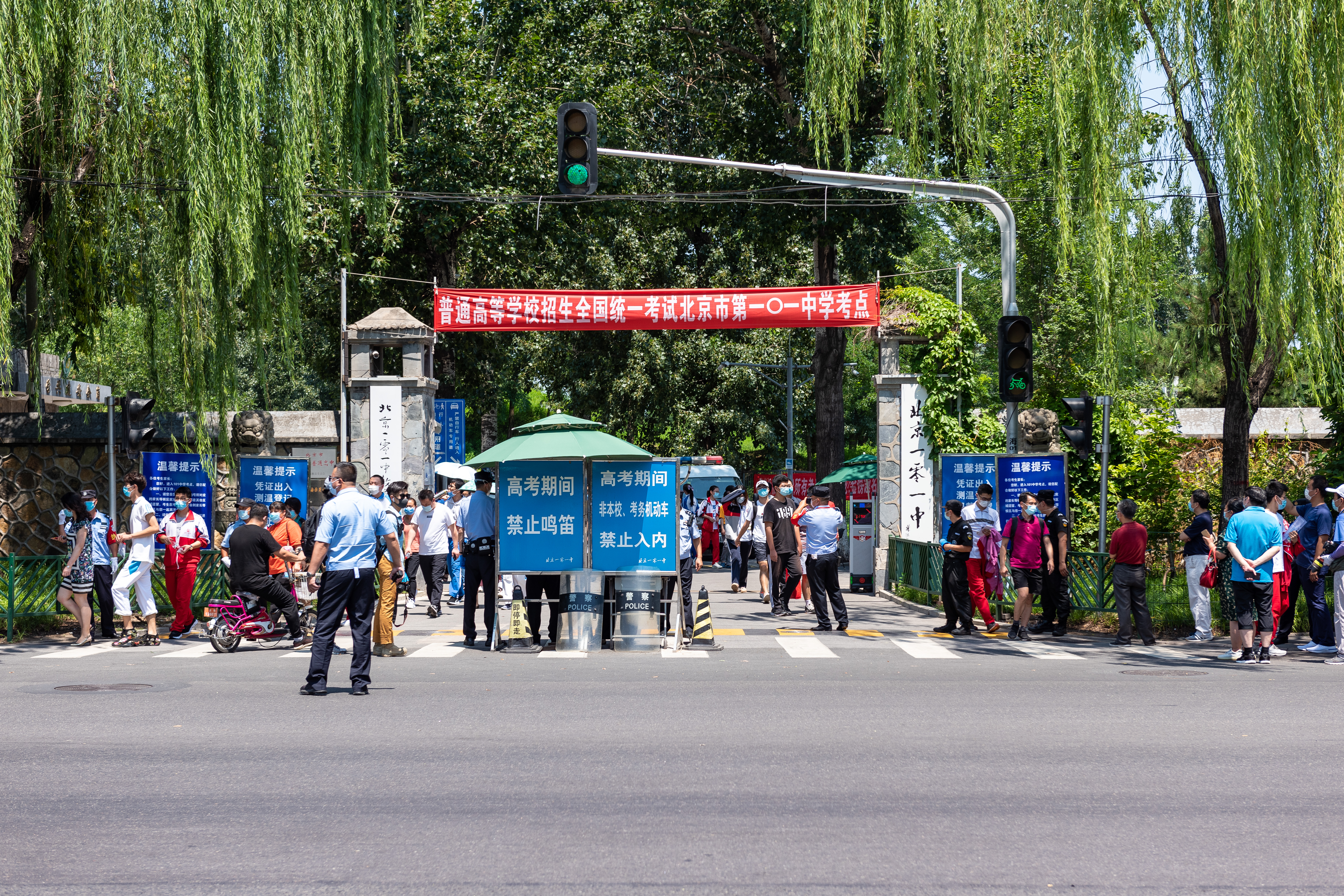

Location
- No.11 Yiheyuan Road, Haidian District (100091); Beijing; China

Information
- Type: Public
- Motto: 百尺竿头，更进一步 (Beyond perfection)
- Established: 1946
- School district: Haidian
- Principal: Lu Yunquan
- Head teacher: Xiong Yongchang
- Campus: Suburban
- Website: beijing101.com

Beijing 101 Middle School (北京一零一中学) is a public secondary school in Haidian, Beijing, China. It offers programs from grades 7 to 12.

The early predecessor of Beijing 101 Middle School was established in Zhangjiakou in 1946. The school's name was successively changed to Zhangjiakou Municipal Middle School, Shanxi-Chahar-Hebei Border Area United Middle School, North China Yucai Middle School, and the Second Department of the Middle School Affiliated to Beijing Normal University. In 1955, the school was named Beijing 101 Middle School.

In addition to the main campus, the school has seven branch campuses: Shuangyushu, Shangdi, Huairou, Wenquan, Shiyou, Kuangda, and Daxing.

== Alumni ==
- Xi Jinping, General Secretary of the Chinese Communist Party, aka paramount leader of China
- Zeng Qinghong, 7th Vice President of the People's Republic of China
- Liu He, Vice Premier of the People's Republic of China
- Li Tieying, Vice Chairperson of the Standing Committee of the National People's Congress
- Xie Fei, child of former President of the Supreme People's Court Xie Juezai
- Susan Tse Borisov, former daughter-in-law of Yury Borisov, niece of Xie Ru
- Mao Dongdong, great-grandchild of Mao Zedong
- Mao Tianyi, great-grandchild of Mao Zedong
- Mao Yuanxin, nephew of Mao Zedong
- Xi Yuanping, child of Xi Zhongxun
- Song Yuqi, singer and member of I-dle

== Gallery ==
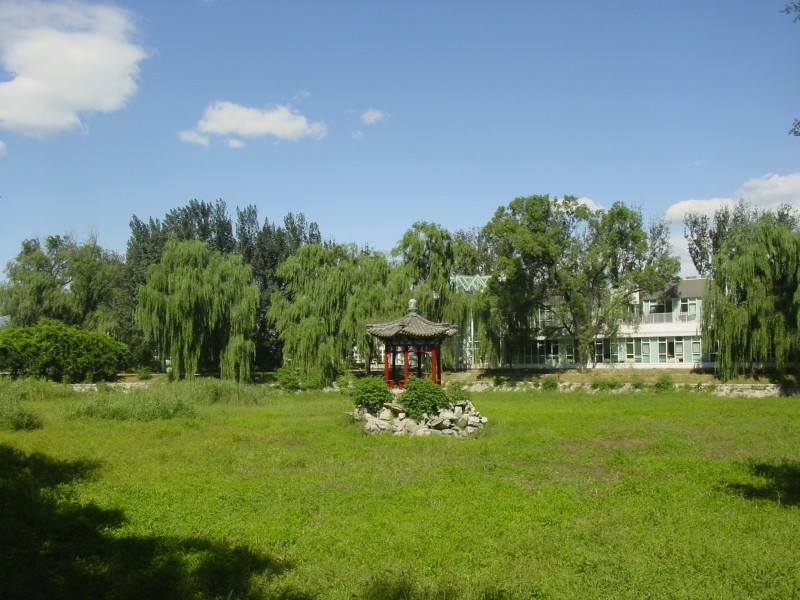

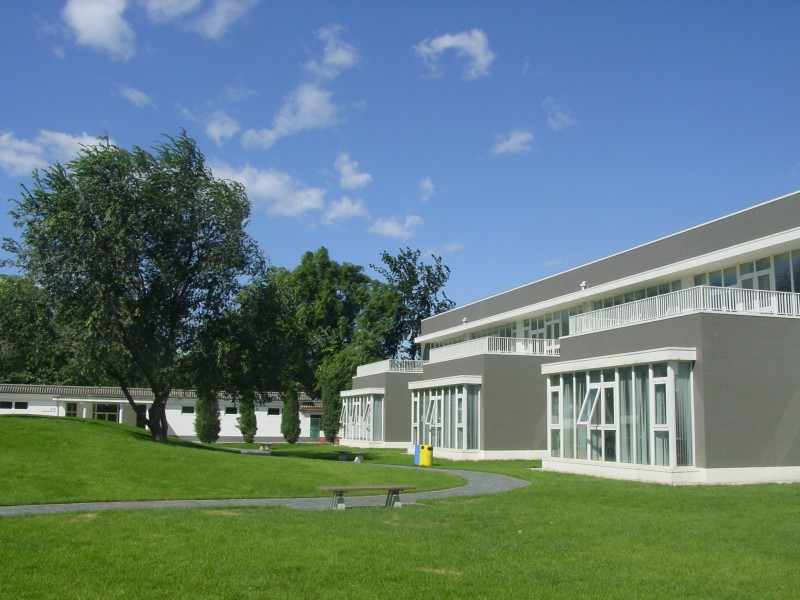

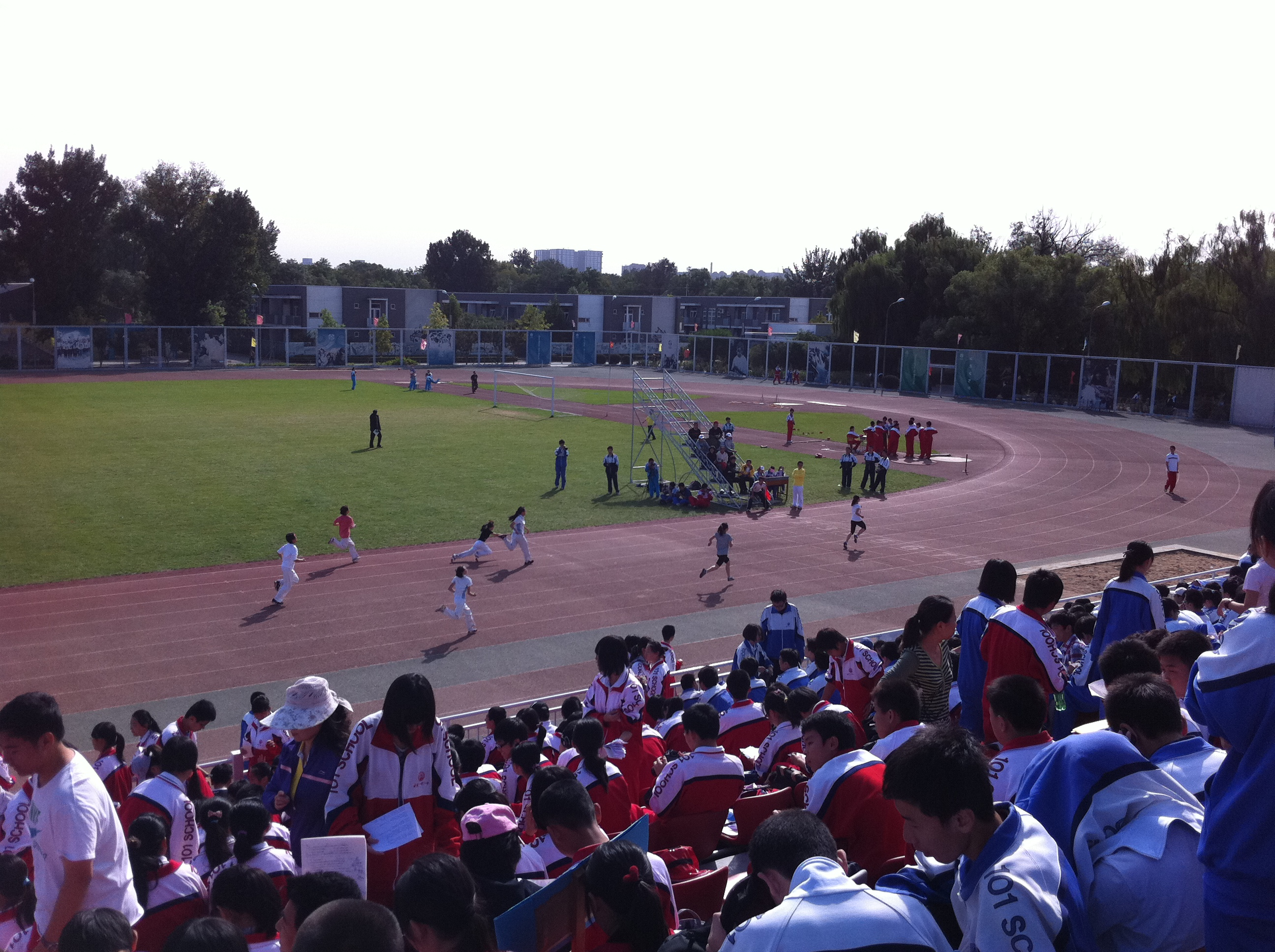

== See also ==
- List of schools in Haidian District
