= Wanshou Si station =

Beijing Subway Line 16 station

Wanshou Si 万寿寺
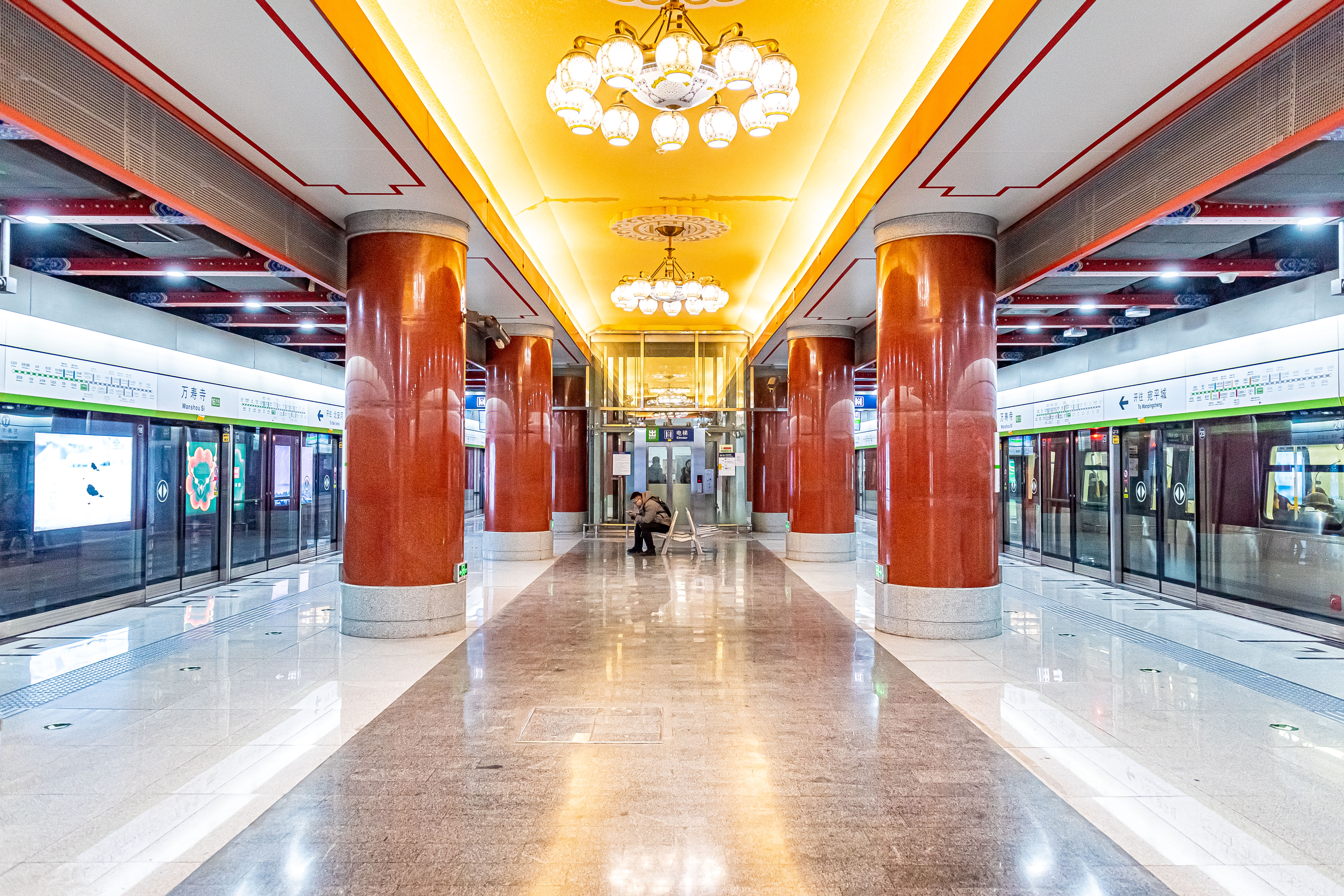
- Platform

General information
- Location: Intersection of 4th Ring Road and Wanshousi Rd., Haidian District, Beijing; China
- Coordinates: 39°56′48″N 116°18′12″E
- Operator: Beijing MTR Metro Line 16 Corp., Ltd.
- Line: Line 16
- Platforms: 2 (1 island platform)
- Tracks: 2

Construction
- Structure type: Underground
- Accessible: Yes

History
- Opened: December 31, 2020; 5 years ago

Services
Preceding station	Beijing Subway	Following station
Suzhou Qiao towards Bei'anhe	Line 16	National Library towards Wanpingcheng
Location
- Location within Beijing

Wanshou Si station (Chinese: 万寿寺站; pinyin: Wànshòu Sì zhàn; lit. 'Wanshou Temple station') is a station on Line 16 of the Beijing Subway.

== History ==
Construction of this station started in March 2014. A pedestrian bridge going over the 3rd Ring Road was demolished to construct the station. The station opened in 2020.

== Station layout ==
The station has an underground island platform. This station has 3 exits, lettered A, C, and D. Exit D is accessible via an elevator.

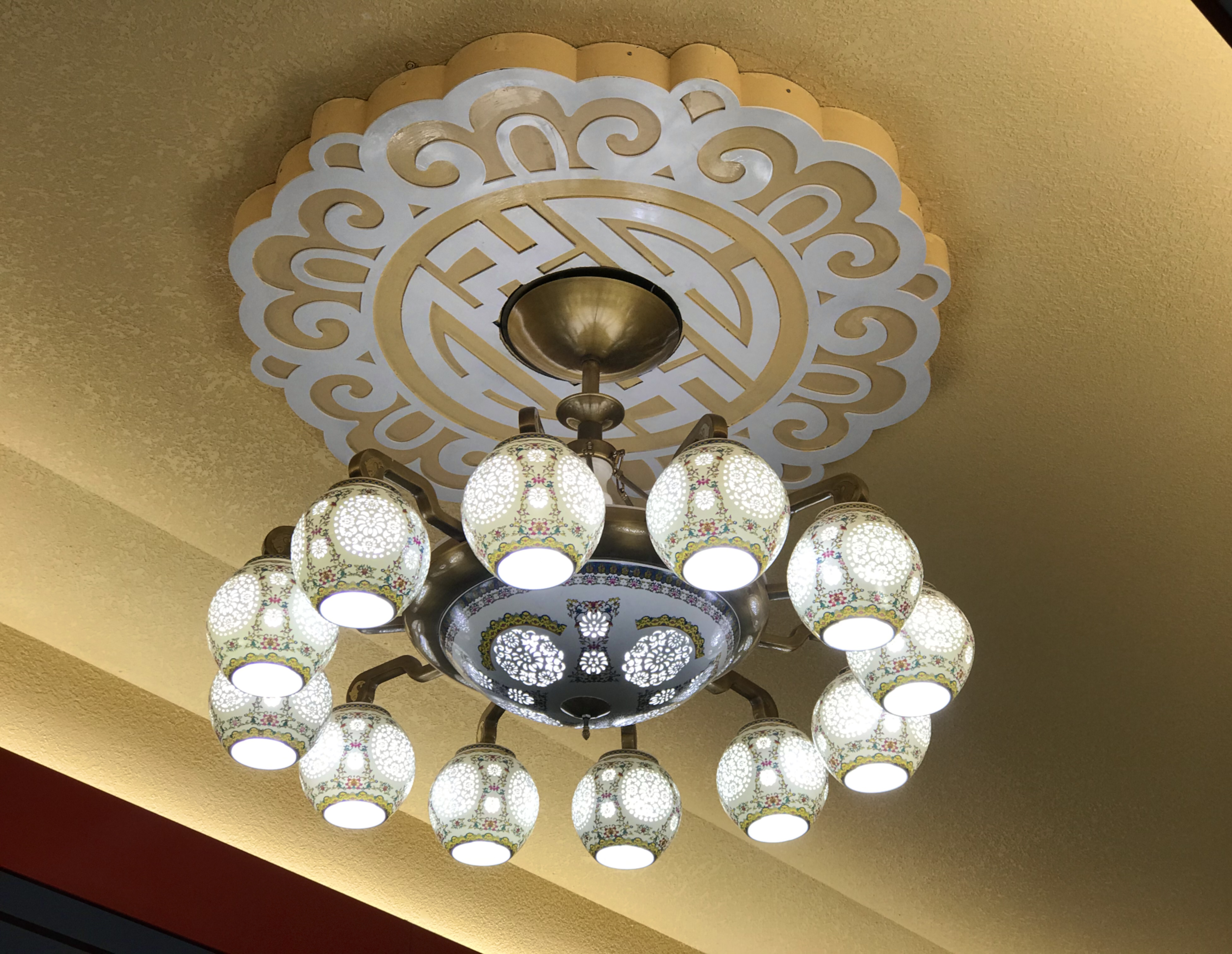
Lamp at the ceiling of the platform

== See also ==
- Wanshou Temple
