= List of schools in Tongzhou, Beijing =

This is a list of schools in Tongzhou District, Beijing.

== Secondary schools ==
Note: In China the word 中学 zhōngxué, literally translated as "middle school", refers to any secondary school and differs from the American usage of the term "middle school" to mean specifically a lower secondary school or junior high school. 初中 chūzhōng is used to refer to a lower secondary school.

- Beijing Luhe International Education Campus (北京潞河国际教育学园)
- Beijing Modern Music School (北京市现代音乐学校)
- Beijing Xincheng Vocational School (北京新城职业学校) - Songzhuang Campus (宋庄校区) and Zhu Campus (主校区)
- Beijing Yucai School Tongzhou Branch School (北京市育才学校通州分校)
- Beijing No. 2 High School Tongzhou Campus (通州校区)
- Beijing City Tongzhou District Lihua School (北京市通州区立华学校)
- Beijing City Tongzhou District Liyuan School (北京市通州区梨园学校)
- Beijing City Tongzhou District Lixinzhuang School (北京市通州区陆辛庄学校)
- Beijing City Tongzhou District Majuqiao School (北京市通州区马驹桥学校)
- Beijing City Tongzhou District Niubaotun School (北京市通州区牛堡屯学校)
- Beijing City Tongzhou District Peizhi School (北京市通州区培智学校)
- Beijing City Tongzhou District Taihu School (北京市通州区台湖学校)
- Beijing City Tongzhou District Teacher Research Center Affiliated School (北京市通州区教师研修中心实验学校)
- Beijing City Tongzhou District Xinhua School (北京市通州区新华学校)
- Beijing City Tongzhou District No. 2 High School (北京市通州区第二中学)
- Beijing City Tongzhou District No. 4 High School (北京市通州区第四中学)
- Beijing City Tongzhou District No. 6 High School (北京市通州区第六中学)
- Beijing City Tongzhou District Beiguan High School (北京市通州区北关中学)
- Beijing City Tongzhou District Chaichantun High School (北京市通州区柴厂屯中学)
- Beijing City Tongzhou District Ciqu High School (北京市通州区次渠中学)
- Beijing City Tongzhou District Dadushe High School (北京市通州区大杜社中学)
- Beijing City Tongzhou District Gantang High School (北京市通州区甘棠中学)
- Beijing City Tongzhou District Kuoxian High School (北京市通州区漷县中学)
- Beijing City Tongzhou District Langfu High School (北京市通州区郎府中学)
- Beijing City Tongzhou District Longwangzhuang High School (北京市通州区龙旺庄中学)
- Beijing City Tongzhou District Luhe High School (北京市通州区潞河中学)
- Beijing City Tongzhou District Luhe High School Affiliated School (北京市通州区潞河中学附属学校)
- Beijing City Tongzhou District Mizidian High School (北京市通州区觅子店中学)
- Beijing City Tongzhou District Songzhuang High School (北京市通州区宋庄中学)
- Beijing City Tongzhou District Xiaowu High School (北京市通州区小务中学)
- Beijing City Tongzhou District Xiji High School (北京市通州区西集中学)
- Beijing City Tongzhou District Yongle High School (北京市通州区永乐店中学)
- Beijing City Tongzhou District Yujiawu High School (北京市通州区于家务中学)
- Beijing City Tongzhou District Yunhe High School (北京市通州区运河中学) - Junior High School Division (初中部) and Senior High School Division (高中部)
- Beijing City Tongzhou District Yuqiao High School (北京市通州区玉桥中学)
- Beijing City Tongzhou District Zhangjiawan High School (北京市通州区张家湾中学)
- High School Affiliated to Beijing Institute of Technology Tongzhou Campus (通州校区)
- Capital Normal University High School Tongzhou Campus (通州校区)
- High School Affiliated to Renmin University of China Tongzhou Campus (通州校区)

== Primary schools ==
- Beijing Tongzhou Yuqiao Primary School
- Tongzhou District Galaxy Bay Primary School

== Private schools ==
- Beijing Shuren Ribet Private School
