= Haiwei =

- Pronunciation: /xai̯.wei̯/ (various tones)
- Gender: Either
- Language: Mandarin Chinese

Origin
- Meaning: Differs depending on Chinese characters used to write it

Haiwei is the Pinyin romanisation of various Chinese given names (e.g. Chinese: 海威; pinyin: Hǎiwēi; or Chinese: 海偉; pinyin: Hǎiwěi). These names are written with various Chinese characters, and may have differences in tone, so neither their pronunciation nor their meaning is identical. People with these names include:

- Kaii Yoshida (born Song Haiwei 宋海伟, 1981), Chinese-born Japanese table tennis player
- Zhu Haiwei (朱海威; born 1991), Chinese footballer
- Chen Haiwei (陈海威; born 1994), Chinese competitive foil fencer

== See also ==
- Hoi Wai (orca) (海威; 1975–1997), killer whale in Ocean Park Hong Kong (pinyin transliteration is Haiwei)
