= High School Affiliated to Beijing Institute of Technology =

- 北京理工大学附属中学
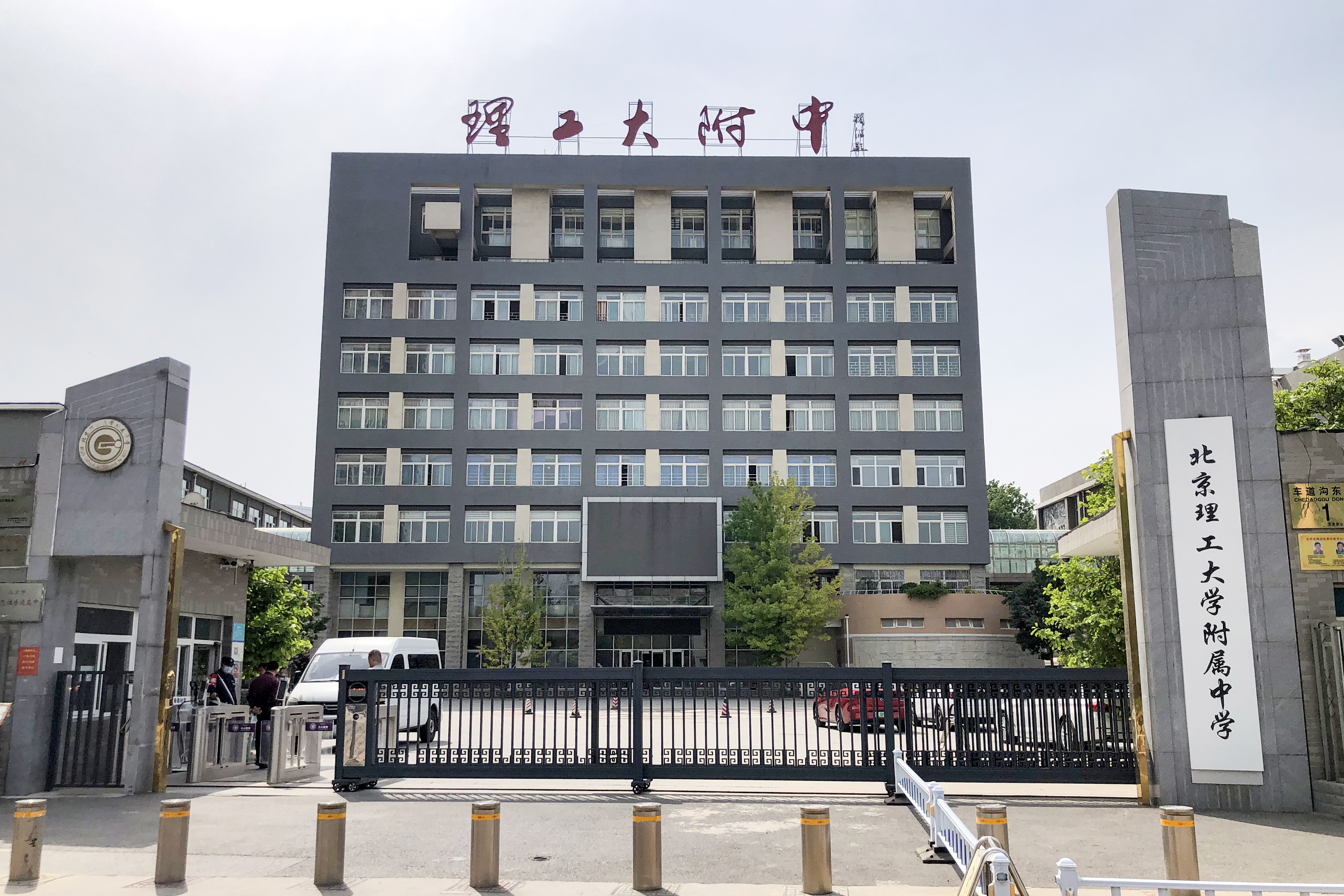
- The school in 2021

Location
- 1 Chedaogou East Road, Zizhuyuan Subdistrict, Haidian District; Beijing; China; 39.94791°N 116.29714°E

Information
- Type: public school
- Motto: Chinese: 厚德积学 沉毅笃行 ("Virtuous, Erudite, Deliberate, Persevering")
- Principal: Wang Hai-xia
- Party Secretary: Pan Jun
- Grades: Grade 1~6 (Primary school section); Grade 7~9 (Junior 1~3); Senior 1~3
- Color: purple
- Website: http://www.lgfz.com.cn/

The High School Affiliated to Beijing Institute of Technology (北京理工大学附属中学) is a public secondary school in Haidian, Beijing.
