= Beijing No. 20 High School =

Public secondary school in Haidian, Beijing, China

- Chinese: 北京市第二十中学
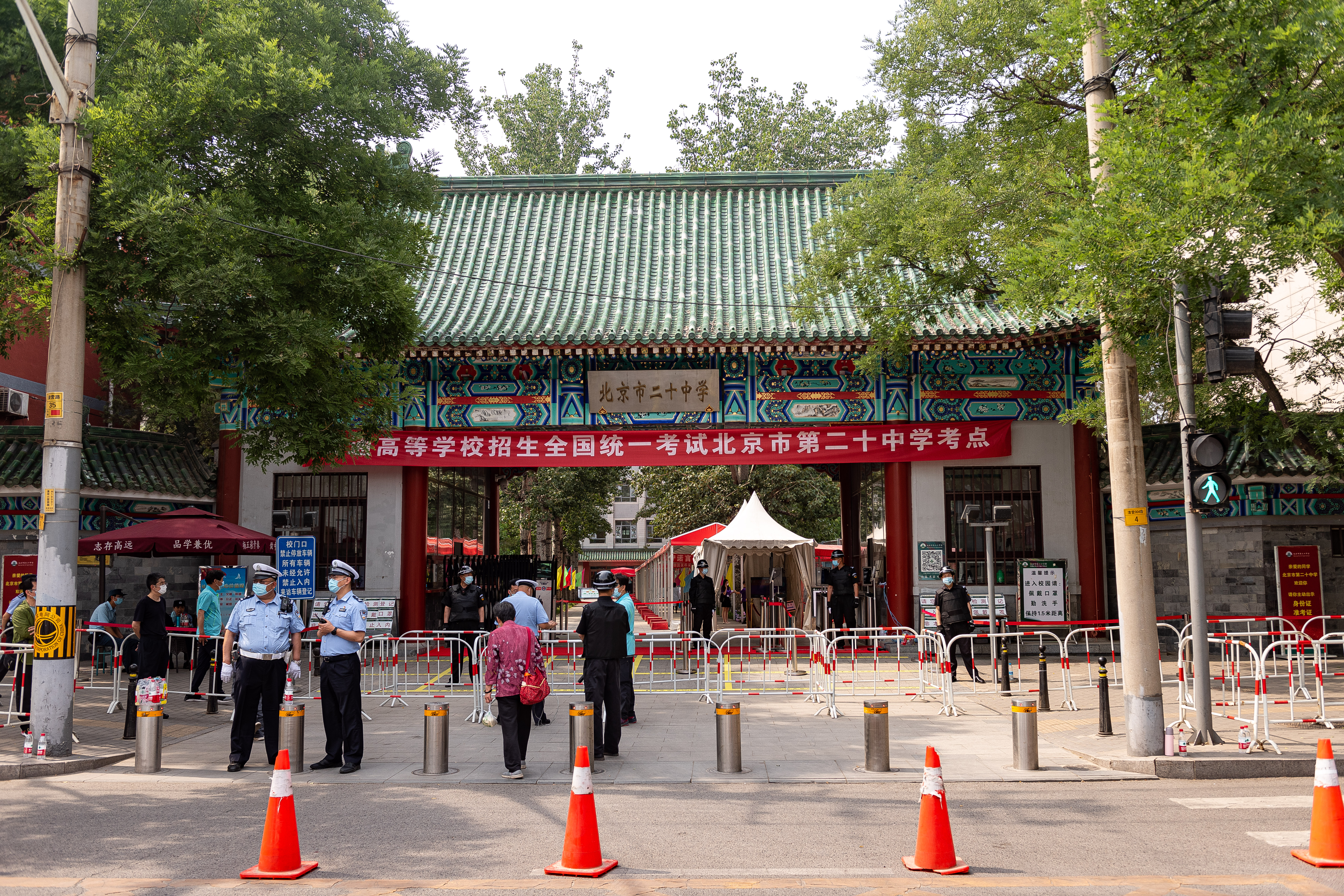

Information
- Website: www.bj20zx.com

Beijing No. 20 High School (Chinese: 北京市第二十中学, romanized: Běijīng shì dì èrshí zhōngxué) is a public secondary school in Qinghe Subdistrict, Haidian, Beijing, China. The school is supervised by the Beijing City Haidian District Education Committee.
