= Beijing Haidian International School =

International school in Beijing, China

Coordinates: 39.94140°N 116.24627°E

- Chinese: 北京市海淀国际学校
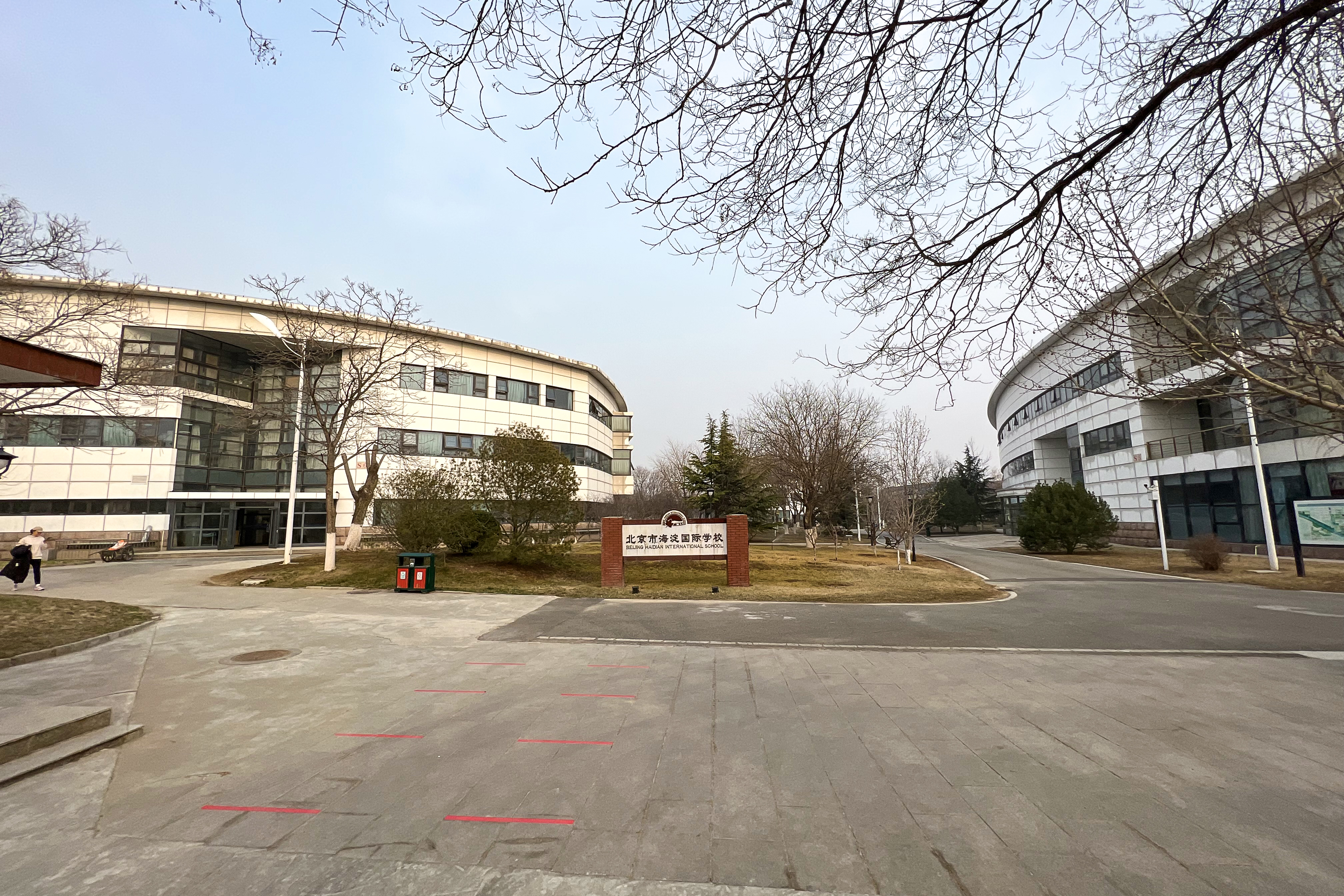

Information
- Affiliation: Beijing Haidian Foreign Language Shi Yan School
- Website: www.bjhdis.com/Category_38/Index.aspx

Beijing Haidian International School (Haiwai; Chinese: 北京市海淀国际学校) is an international school in Beijing, China. The school, established by Beijing Haidian Foreign Language Shi Yan School, serves up to Year 12.
