= Beijing Haidian Foreign Language Shi Yan School =

Private school in Beijing, China

Coordinates: 39.94249°N 116.25011°E

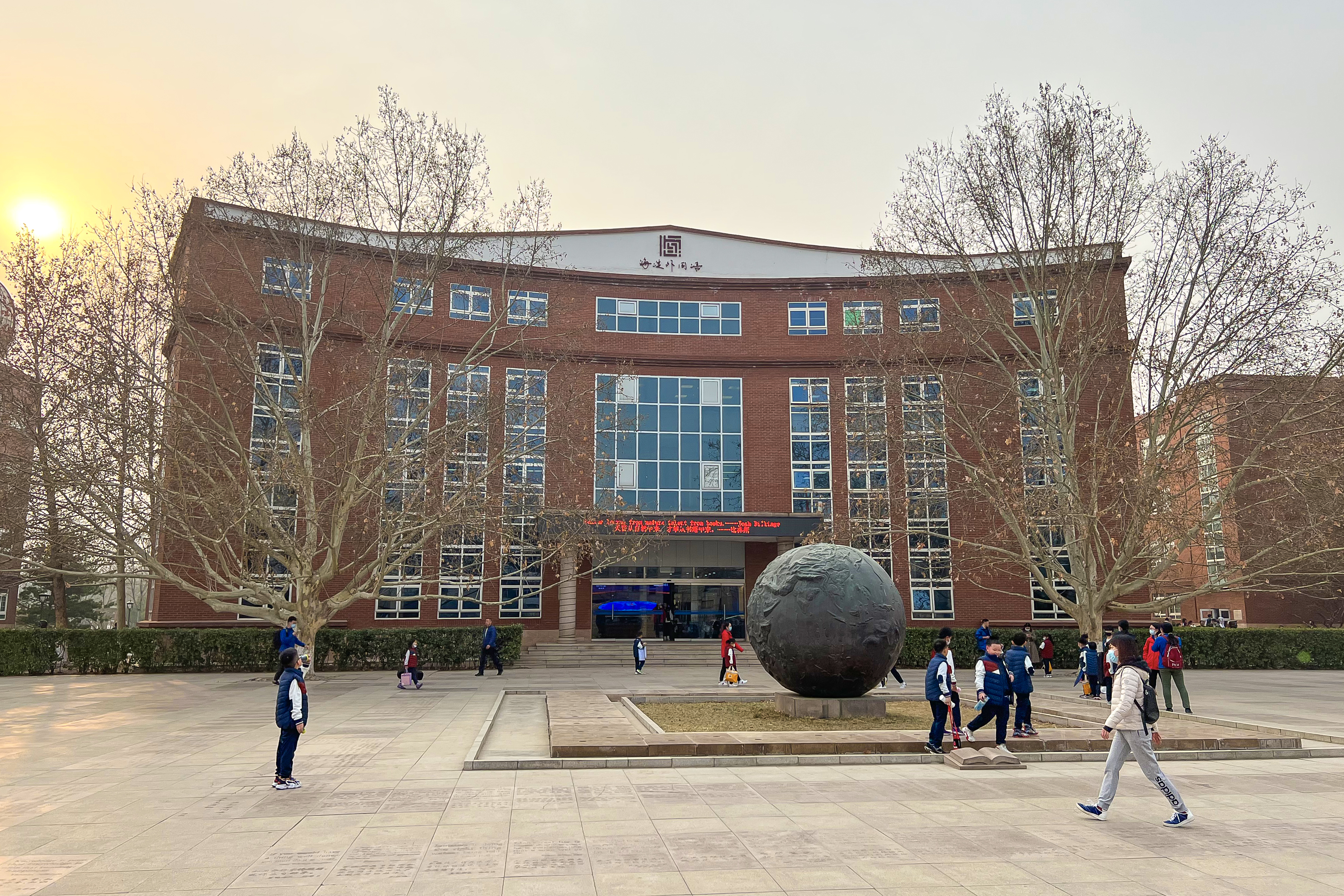
Main building

The Beijing Haidian Foreign Language Shi Yan School (simplified Chinese: 北京市海淀外国语实验学校; traditional Chinese: 北京市海澱外國語實驗學校; pinyin: Běijīng Shì Hǎidiàn Wàiguóyǔ Shíyàn Xuéxiào "Beijing Haidian Foreign Language Experimental School") or Haiwai (海外 Hǎiwài) in short is a private school in Haidian District, Beijing, China. The school teaches elementary, secondary, and senior high school.

In 1999 the school was founded. It established the Beijing Haidian International School.

In 2011 the school and Lake Shore Public Schools of Metro Detroit, United States signed an agreement to work solely with each other lasting 21 years. The private school sends senior high school students on exchanges to the United States, where they live in a special dormitory established by Lake Shore Schools.

In 2014, the school and Paramus Catholic High School (PC) had established sister school relationship, and launched a new program by sending students to 9th grade for one full school year.

This school has a lot of foreign teachers with classes include AP, IB and A-level.

== Notable alumni ==
- Lu Han
