= Zizhuyuan Subdistrict =

Zizhuyuan Subdistrict 紫竹院街道
- Subdistrict
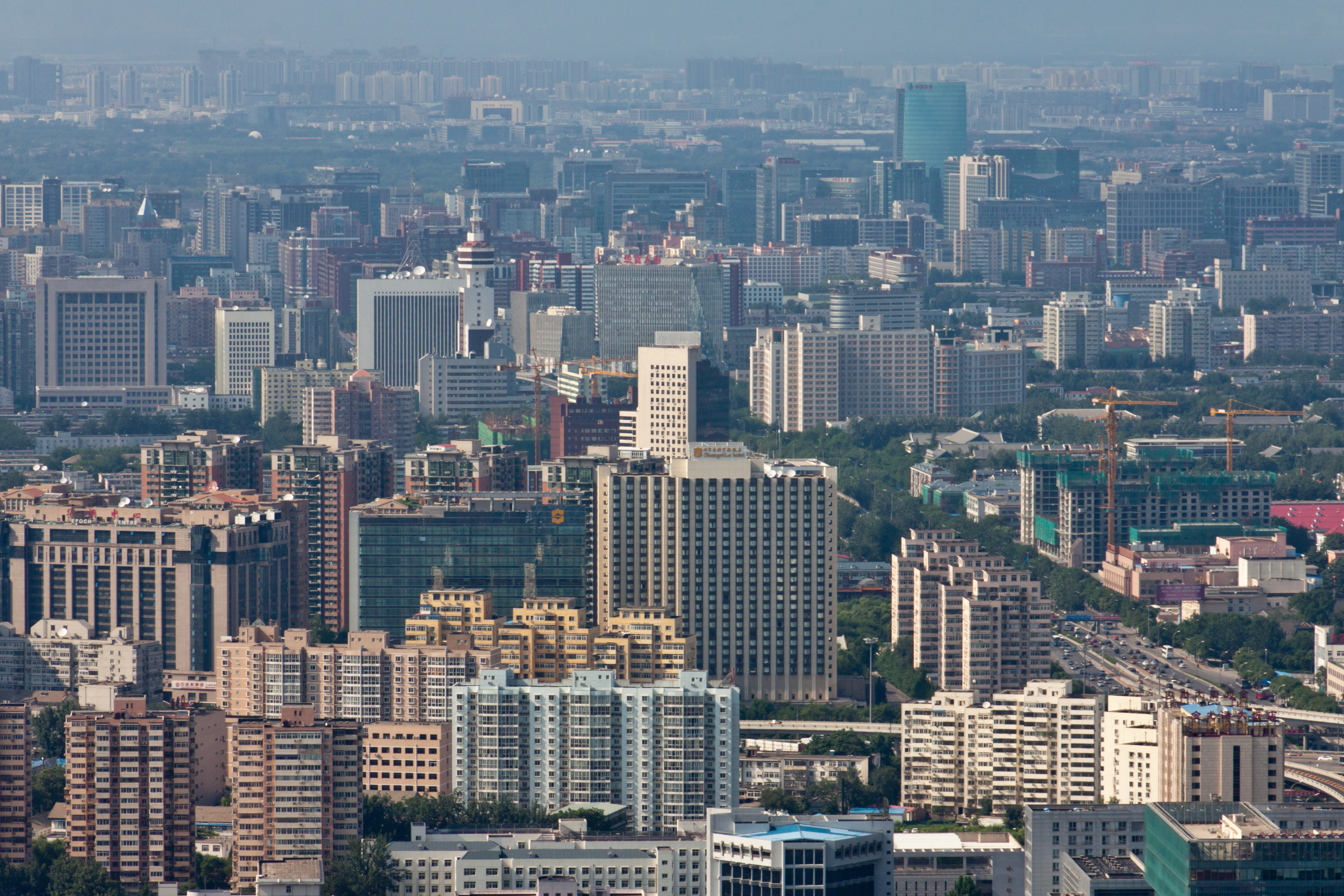
- Aerial view of the subdistrict, 2012

- Location within Beijing Location within China
- Coordinates: 39°56′36″N 116°18′22″E
- Country: China
- Municipality: Beijing
- District: Haidian
- Village-level Divisions: 22 communities

Area
  - Total: 6.23 km^{2} (2.41 sq mi)
- Elevation: 58 m (190 ft)

Population (2020)
  - Total: 129,367
  - Density: 20,800/km^{2} (53,800/sq mi)
- Time zone: UTC+8 (China Standard)
- Postal code: 100089
- Area code: 010

Zizhuyuan Subdistrict (Chinese: 紫竹院街道; pinyin: Zǐzhúyuàn Jiēdào) is a subdistrict of Haidian District, Beijing. It borders Haidian Subdistrict to the north, Beixiaguan Subdistrict to the east, Balizhuang and Ganjiakou Subdistricts to the south, and Shuguang Subdistrict to the west. As of 2020, it had a total population of 129,367.

The subdistrict was formed in 1959 as Landianchang subdistrict, and received its current name in 1978 after the Purple Bamboo Park within the region.

== Administrative Divisions ==
As of 2021, the subdistrict had 22 residential communities within its borders:

Administrative division code	Subdivision names	Name transliteration
110108006001	魏公村北区	Weigongcun Beiqu
110108006002	魏公村南区	Weigongcun Nanqu
110108006003	韦伯豪	Weibohao
110108006005	法华寺	Fahuasi
110108006006	万寿寺	Wanshousi
110108006007	紫竹	Zizhu
110108006008	三虎桥	Sanhuqiao
110108006009	北洼路	Beiwalu
110108006010	厂洼第一	Changwa Diyi
110108006011	厂洼第二	Changwa Di'er
110108006012	车道沟	Chedaogou
110108006013	车道沟南里	Chedaogou Nanli
110108006017	北京理工大学	Beijing Ligong Daxue
110108006018	中央民族大学	Zhongyang Minzu Daxue
110108006019	北京外国语大学	Beijing Waiguoyu Daxue
110108006020	中国青年政治学院	Zhongg Qingnian Zhengzhi Xueyuan
110108006021	航天部五院	Hangtianbu Wuyuan
110108006025	万寿山庄	Wanshou Shanzhuang
110108006026	兵器工业机关	Bingqi Gongchang Jiguan
110108006028	军乐团	Junyuedui
110108006035	西苑饭店西区	Xiyuan Fandian Xiqu
110108006046	厂洼	Changwa

== See also ==
- List of township-level divisions of Beijing
